= Shervashidze =

Shervashidze may refer to:

- House of Shervashidze, Chachba, or Chachibaia, a ruling family of the Principality of Abkhazi
- Shervashidze Palace, a ruined structure in the village of Lykhny in Abkhazia/Georgia
- Eristavi-Shervashidze (or Eristavi of Guria), a Georgian noble family and a branch of the Shervashidze

== People ==
- Aleksandr Shervashidze (1867–1968), Russian painter and scenic designer
- Aslan-Bey Shervashidze, prince of the Principality of Abkhazia in 1808–1810
- Dardin Shervashidze (died 1243), Georgian noble
- George Vladimirovitch Shervashidze (1894-1978), titular Prince of Abkhazia from 1968 to 1978
- Giorgi Mikhailovitch Shervashidze (1846-1918), titular Prince of Abkhazia
- Giorgi Shervashidze (police general) (born 1955), Georgian politician and retired Lieutenant-General of Police
- Kelesh Ahmed-Bey Shervashidze (1747–1808), head of state of the Principality of Abkhazia from the 1780s to 1808
- Mary Eristavi (née Shervashidze; 1888–1986), Georgian aristocrat and Coco Chanel model
- Nikita Georgevitch Shervashidze (1941–2008), Bulgarian politician
- Sefer Ali-Bey Shervashidze, prince of the Principality of Abkhazia in 1810–21
- Zurab Shervashidze, ruler of Abkhazia around 1770–1780
