= Ivane Abkhazi =

Ivane Abkhazi (Georgian: ივანე აფხაზი) or Ivan Nikolayevich Abkhazov (Russian: Иван Николаевич Абхазов) (1764 or 1786 – 1831) was a nobleman from Georgia, who served in the Imperial Russian military and rose to the rank of major-general during the Caucasus War.

Abkhazi, born of a princely family from Kakheti, was one of the first Georgian noblemen who joined the Russian military on the Tsar's annexation of Georgia in 1800. He rose in seniority during the war with Iran (1804–13), being an aide to General Pyotr Kotlyarevsky. He was promoted to major in 1812, colonel in 1821, and major-general in 1826. He was instrumental in defeating the rebel prince Aslan-Bey in Abkhazia in the 1820s. During the second war with Iran (1826–28) Abkhazi was chief of staff of General Nikita Pankratiev's corps and then a military administrator of the South Caucasian Muslim provinces. In 1830, he commanded a punitive force which forced the Ingush and Ossetian highlanders into submission. His service had been awarded by the Order of St. George, 4th Rank (1813). Count Ivan Paskevich, his former superior in the Caucasus, summoned Abkhazi to service in Warsaw on his transfer to Poland, but Abkhazi died on his way to a new appointment.

== Early life ==
Prince Abkhazi was born of the Georgian noble family, whose ancestor had fled Abkhazia to the Kingdom of Kakheti in eastern Georgia in the 17th century. His early life and career unfolded against the backdrop of a sequence of dramatic events in Georgia, from the Iranian invasion in 1795 through the death of the last kings of Georgia, Heraclius II and George XII in 1798 and 1800, respectively, and the ensuing dynastic crisis, all of which led to the arrival of the Russian rule by early 1801.

Being one of the first in Georgia to have joined the Imperial service, Prince Abkhazi remained a Russian loyalist even when many of his aristocratic compatriots became involved in secret societies plotting a coup for an independent Georgia. One of them, Prince Grigol Orbeliani, a poet and Russian army officer, recalled an August 1831 dialogue with General Abkhazi, who maintained his conviction that the Russian withdrawal would have been a disaster for Georgia as, after the thirty years of a foreign rule, the country would have had a great difficulty in building a modern regular army to defend its independence against the neighbors in Asia.

== Early career ==
Abkhazi began his career in the 17th Jäger Regiment of the Imperial Russian Army in 1800. That year, in November, he took part in the battle on the Iori, in which a combined Russo–Georgian army defeated the Dagestani chieftain Omar Khan of Avary and his Georgian ally, Prince Royal Alexander. During the Russo–Iranian war of 1804–13, Abkhazi was aide-de-camp to General Kotlyarevsky, who brought the protracted war to a victorious end by defeating the numerically superior Iranian army at Aslanduz in October 1812. This was followed, in January 1813, by storming of the Caspian fortress of Lenkoran, where Major Abkhazi commanded one of the attacking columns and was decorated with the Order of St. George for his conduct.

== Abkhazian expedition and second war with Iran ==
After the war with Iran, Abkhazi continued his service in the Caucasus and, in November 1821, at the head of the 44th Jäger Regiment, fought under Prince Pyotr Gorchakov in Abkhazia. He successfully overran the Abkhaz defenses at the Kodori, thereby paving way to Gorchakov's mission to install the Russian protege, Dmitry Shervashidze, as prince of Abkhazia; Dmitry's rebellious relative, Aslan-Bey, had to take flight to Circassia. On the outbreak of the second war with Iran in 1826, Abkhazi was made chief of staff of General Pankratiev's corps. In 1827, General Paskevich, commander-in-chief in the Caucasus, appointed Abkhazi a military administrator in the former South Caucasian khanates—Karabakh, Shaki, and Shirvan. The Imperial Russian military historian Vasily Potto reported that during his tenure Abkhazi, already known for his military prowess, showed great administrative skills. He was able to secure the loyalty of the local Muslim population, thereby preventing a large-scale anti-Russian insurrection in the region, and, further, negotiated the return from Iran of the former khan of Karabakh, Mehdi Quli, who would spend the rest of his life in private retirement in his former khanate. In 1829, Abkhazi provided security to the Iranian prince Khosrow Mirza, returning through Karabakh from his mission to St. Petersburg to offer apologies for the murder of the Russian diplomat Aleksander Griboyedov in Tehran.

== North Ossetian campaign ==
In June 1830, Prince Abkhazi, already a major-general by that time, returned to a field command at the head of an expeditionary force marshaled by Paskevich to eliminate the threat from the North Caucasian mountaineers to the vital Georgian Military Road. In a campaign that lasted from 8 July to 6 August 1830, Abkhazi defeated the resistance of Ingush clans and brought the North Ossetians into submission; the recalcitrant settlements were burned down. As the historian Potto related, so great an impression did Abkhazi's campaign make, that the people of Ossetia were much in the habit of considering his times as an era from which to count. Field Marshal Paskevich, leaving the Caucasus, invited Abkhazi to follow him in Poland, but the general died of cholera before reaching his destination.
