= Kelasuri Wall =

- კელასურის კედელი
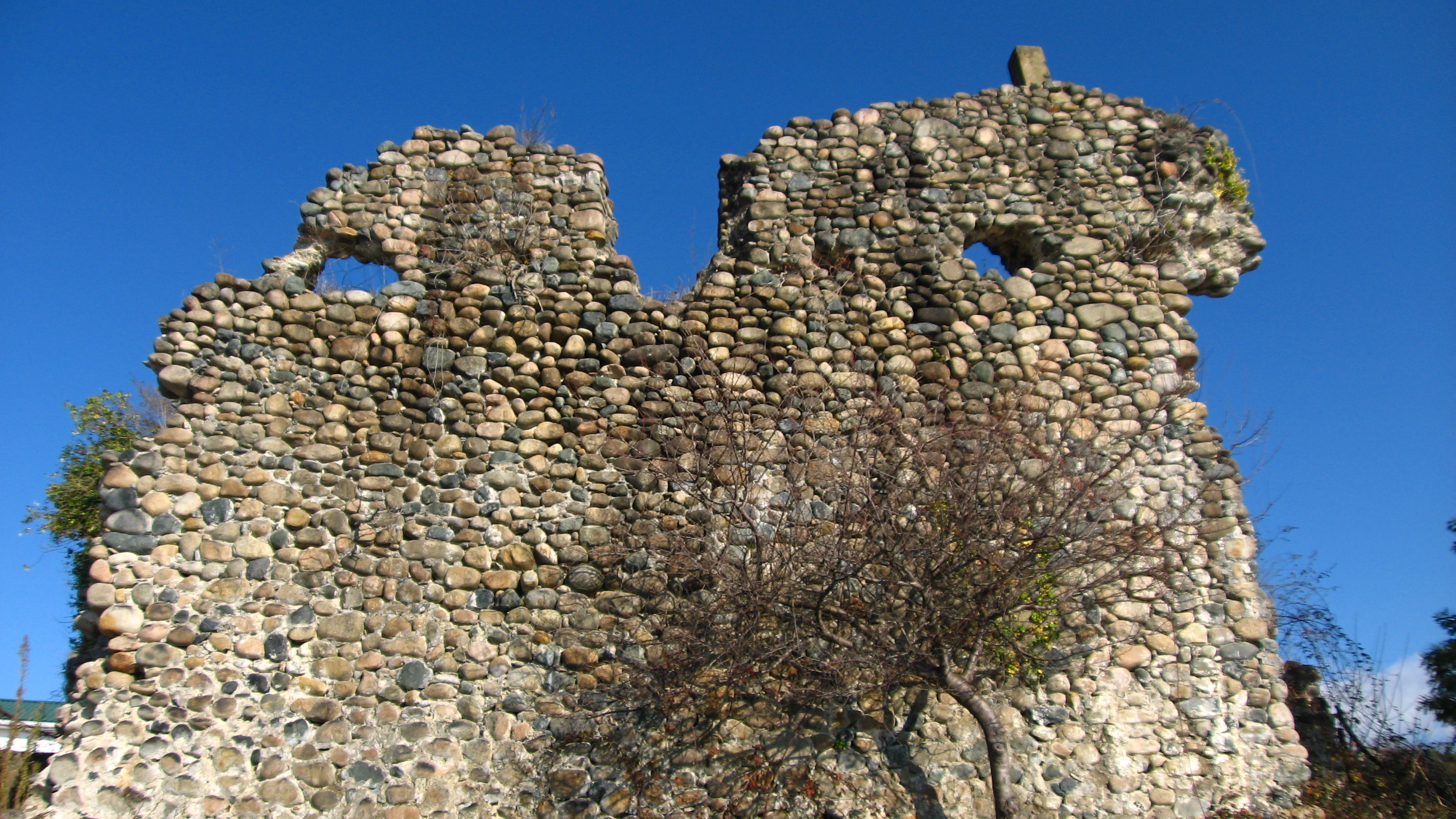
- Ruins of the first tower of the wall

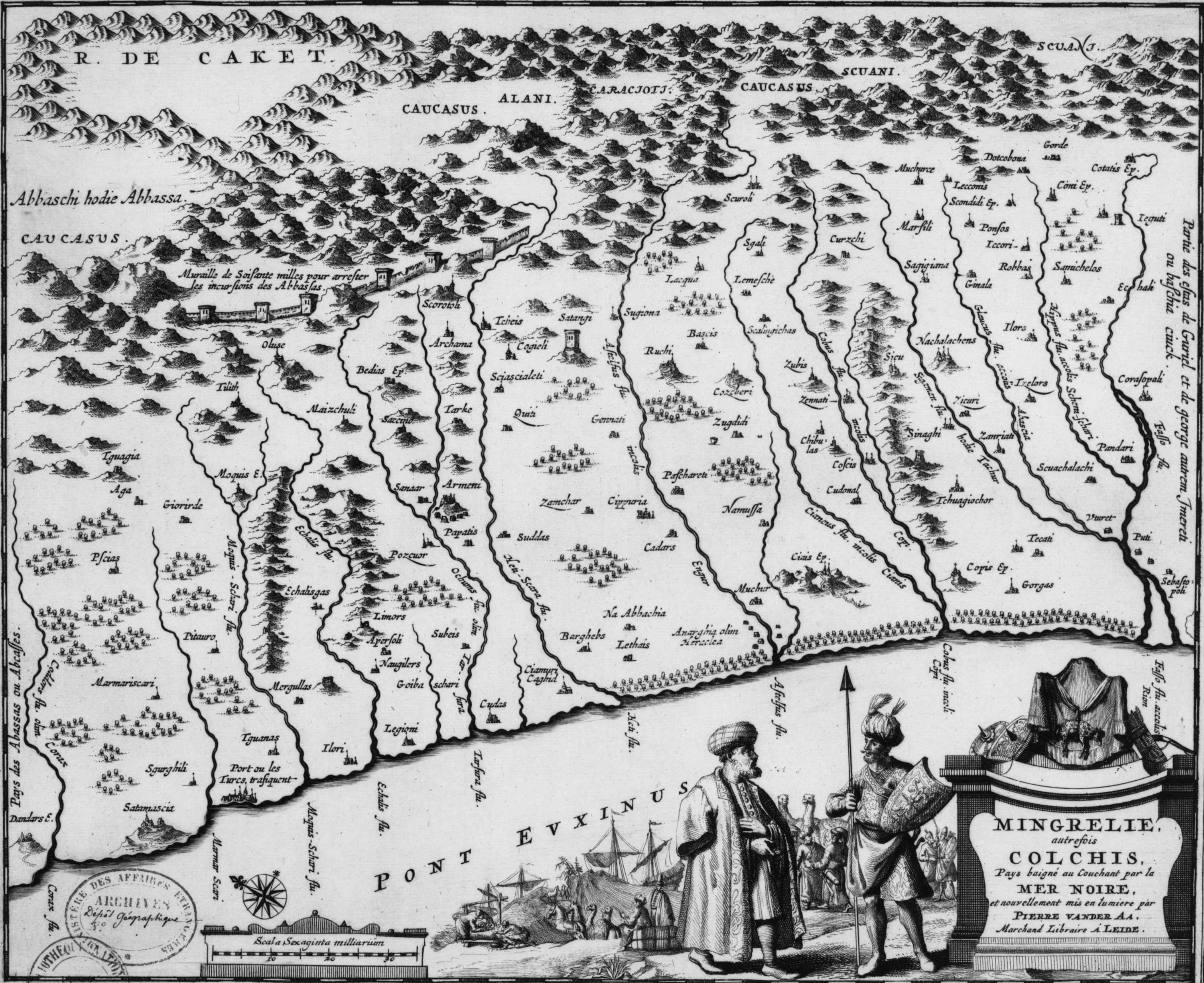
- The wall is shown on this 17th century map in the upper reaches of Galidzga, Okumi and Eristskari rivers (top left corner)

General information
- Country: Abkhazia (Note: The political status of Abkhazia is disputed. Having unilaterally declared independence from Georgia in 1992, Abkhazia is formally recognised as an independent state by 5 UN member states (two other states previously recognised it but then withdrew their recognition), while the remainder of the international community recognizes it as de jure Georgian territory. Georgia continues to claim the area as its own territory, designating it as Russian-occupied territory.)/Georgia
- Coordinates: 42.58°N 41.04°E

The Kelasuri Wall (Georgian: კელასურის კედელი) or Great Abkhazian Wall (Georgian: აფხაზეთის დიდი კედელი) is a stone wall located to the east of Sokhumi in Abkhazia, Georgia. The exact time of its construction is not known; several dates ranging from antiquity to the 17th century were suggested, although more recent works have provisionally favoured construction in the 6th century AD. The wall featured about 300 towers, most of them now entirely or largely ruined.

== Location ==
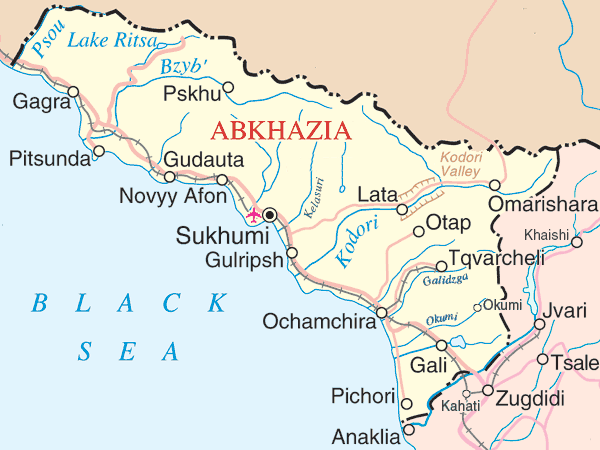
The wall begins near the mouth of Kelasuri and ends on the right bank of Enguri

The wall begins near the mouth of Kelasuri River where the ruins of a large tower remained. It goes to the east crossing Kodori River near Tsebelda fortress, then passes near Tkvarcheli and terminates near the village of Lekukhona on the right bank of Enguri.

Most of the fortifications are located in the western part of the wall between Kelasuri and Mokvi Rivers. Kelasuri's left bank and mountain passes were most heavily fortified. On the other hand, only four towers were found between Tkvarcheli and Enguri.

== Towers ==
The wall was not continuous as its builders made use of natural obstacles such as steep slopes and gorges. 279 towers belonging to the wall have been identified, about a hundred of them are extant. The usual distance between towers is 40–120 m, where there was no continuous wall some towers were 300, 500 and 1000 m apart.

All the towers are rectangular (7 by 8 or 8 by 9 meters), 4–6 m high and have shallow foundations. Each tower had a door in its southern wall framed by massive stone beams, sometimes a narrow staircase was also added. Embrasures were usually located in the towers' northern and western walls on the second floor.

== History of construction ==
Since the wall was first examined scientifically in the early 19th century, many hypotheses on who and when built it were published. For example, the Swiss traveller Frédéric Dubois de Montpéreux (fr) asserted that the wall was built by Greeks in the last centuries BC to protect their colony of Dioscurias (which he erroneously placed near the Kodori cape

According to Mikhail Ivashchenko, the wall was built by Byzantines in the 4th century to protect their possessions and control mountain passes. He connected the name of the river Kelasuri with Byzantine Greek kleisoura, a Byzantine territorial unit smaller than a theme. Several other historians supported this date although they could not agree on the length and orientation of the wall.

Yuri Voronov, a well-known Abkhazian historian and archaeologist, examined the Abkhazian wall in 1966-1971 and proposed a new date of its construction. According to Voronov, Prince of Mingrelia, Levan II Dadiani built Kelasuri Walls between 1628 and 1653 to protect his fiefdom from the Abkhaz invasions (though at that time Principality of Abkhazia was a nominal vassal of Mingrelia). Per Voronov's work the embrasures in the wall were made for firearms; he also quoted Georgian historian Vakhushti and Italian missionary Arcangelo Lamberti who both wrote about the wall built by Megrelian princes for protection from the Abkhaz.
