= Duchy of Tskhumi =

Georgian duchy (786–1354)

Duchy of Tskhumi ცხუმის საერისთავო
- Duchy of the Kingdom of Georgia; then Kingdom of Imereti
- 786–1354
- Coat of arms

- Administrative division of the medieval Kingdom of Georgia in 13th century..
- Capital: Tskhumi
- Historical era: Middle Ages
  - Established: 786
  - Disestablished: 1354
| Succeeded by |
| Principality of Mingrelia; Principality of Abkhazia |
- Today part of: Georgia

The Duchy of Tskhumi (Georgian: ცხუმის საერისთავო) was a duchy (saeristavo) in medieval Georgia. Ruled by the House of Shervashidze, the duchy existed from the 8th to 14th century, in the north-western part of Georgia and comprised territories around modern Sukhumi, Georgia.

== History ==
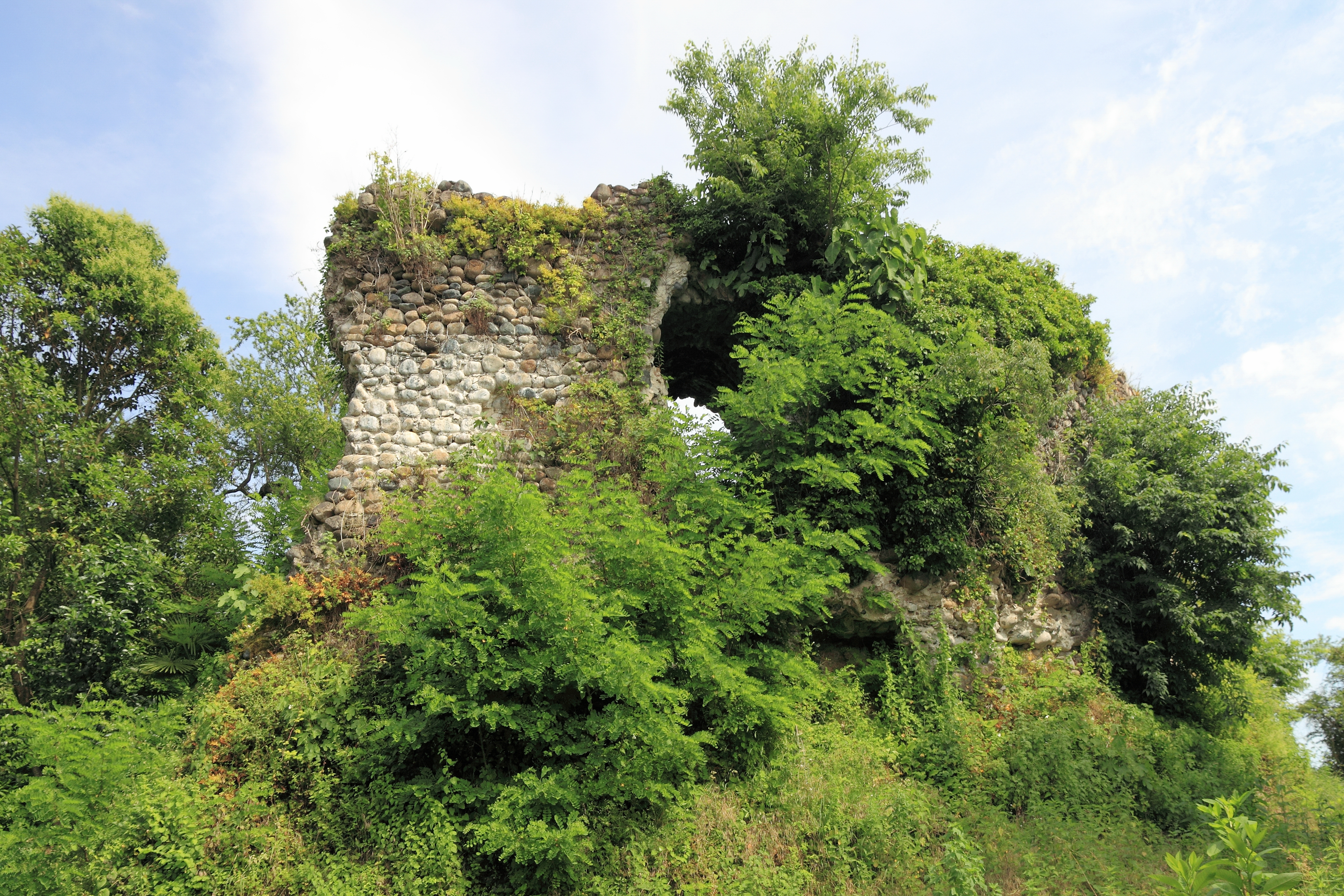
Ruins of Bagrat's Castle.

The Duchy of Tskhumi was probably formed as a separate feudal entity during the reign of Leon II on the lands of ancient Apsiles. Forming one of the eight duchies of Kingdom of Abkhazia, it comprised territories above Lazica up to Anakopia and Alania. Bagrat's castle served as the seat of the Eristavi of Tskhumi.

In 1033, Bagrat IV's half-brother Demetre organized the plot with the aim of dethrone his brother. Although an attempt by some great nobles to exploit Demetre's possible aspirations to the throne in their opposition to Bagrat's rule failed. Now threatened by Bagrat, the dowager Queen Alda defected to the Byzantines and surrendered Anakopia to the emperor Romanos III, who honored her son Demetre with the rank of magistros. According to the words of the chronicler of The Georgian Chronicles: King Bagrat defeated the united army of his opponents and then besieged Anakopia, then he went back, leaving Eristav of Abkhazia - Otago Chachasdze and his army to take charge of the fortress. Owing to the active support of the Abkhazian Eristav, Bagrat IV managed to return the fortress of Anakopia to Georgia.

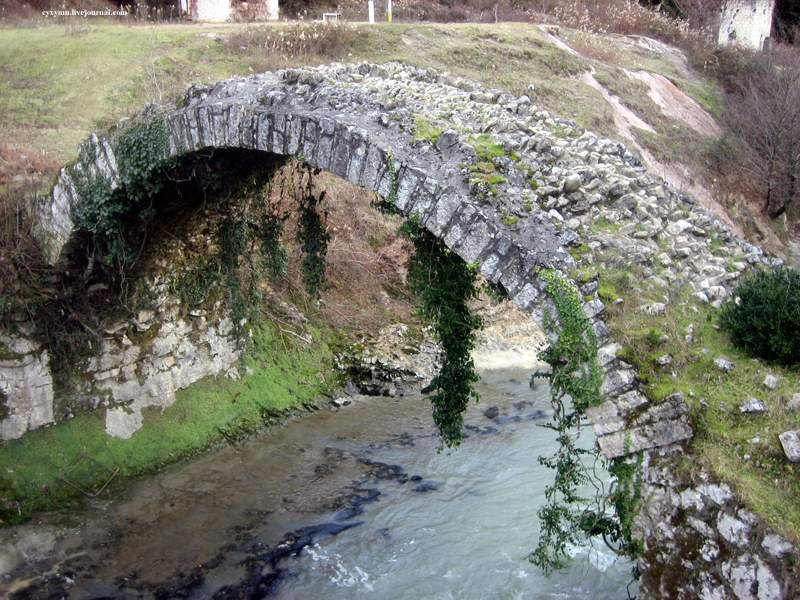
Besleti Bridge, a medieval arched stone bridge at Sukhumi, is one of the most illustrative examples of the medieval bridge design popular during the reign of Tamar of Georgia (r. 1184-1213)

In the 12th century, King David the Builder appointed the son of shah Shirvan Otagho as a viceroy of Abkhazia, who later became the founder of House of Shervashidze. The city of Tskhumi (Sukhumi) became the summer residence of the Georgian kings. According to Russian scholar V. Sizov, it became an important "cultural and administrative center of the Georgian state. The historian Yuri Voronov also conjectured that the castle might have hosted the queen-regnant Tamar of Georgia during her stays in Abkhazia in the early 13th century. During this period, the Eristavi (Duke) of Tskhumi was Otagho Shervashidze.

In the 1240s, Mongols divided Georgia into eight military-administrative sectors (Tumens), the territory of contemporary Abkhazia formed part of the duman administered by Tsotne Dadiani of Odishi. Vakhushti notes that the Duchy started to decline in the 14th century after consolidation of power in western Georgia by dukes of Odishi. During the civil war between the successors of Imeretian King David Narin — Constantine and Michael, Duke of Odishi, Giorgi I Dadiani, subjugated much of the duchy of Tskhumi and expanded his possessions up to Anakopia, while the Shervashidze entrenched in Abkhazia, from that time on Georgian monarchs were recognizing Tskhumi as a feudal domains of House of Dadiani.

In the 12th–13th centuries, Tskhumi became a center of traffic with the European maritime powers. The Republic of Genoa established its short-lived trading factory at Tskhumi (Sebastopolis) early in the 14th century. Tskhumi served as the capital of the Odishi-Megrelian rulers. It was in this city that Vamek I (c. 1384-1396), the most influential Dadiani, minted his coins. Documents of the 15th century clearly distinguished Tskhumi from Principality of Abkhazia. The Ottoman navy occupied the town in 1451, but for a short time. Later contested between the princes of Abkhazia and Mingrelia, Tskhumi (Suhum-Kale) temporarily fell into Ottoman hands in 1578.

== Rulers ==
- Otagho I Shervashidze (?–1138)
- Otagho II Shervashidze (1184–1213)
- Dardin Shervashidze (?–1243)
- Tsotne Dadiani (1245–c. 1260)
- Bedan Dadiani (c. 1270s– c. 1290s)
- Giorgi I Dadiani (c. 1293–1323)
- Puto Shervashidze (1581–?)

== See also ==
- Principality of Abkhazia
- Duchy of Aragvi
- Duchy of Racha
- Duchy of Ksani
