= Bagrat's Castle =

Medieval castle in Georgia

- ბაგრატის ციხე
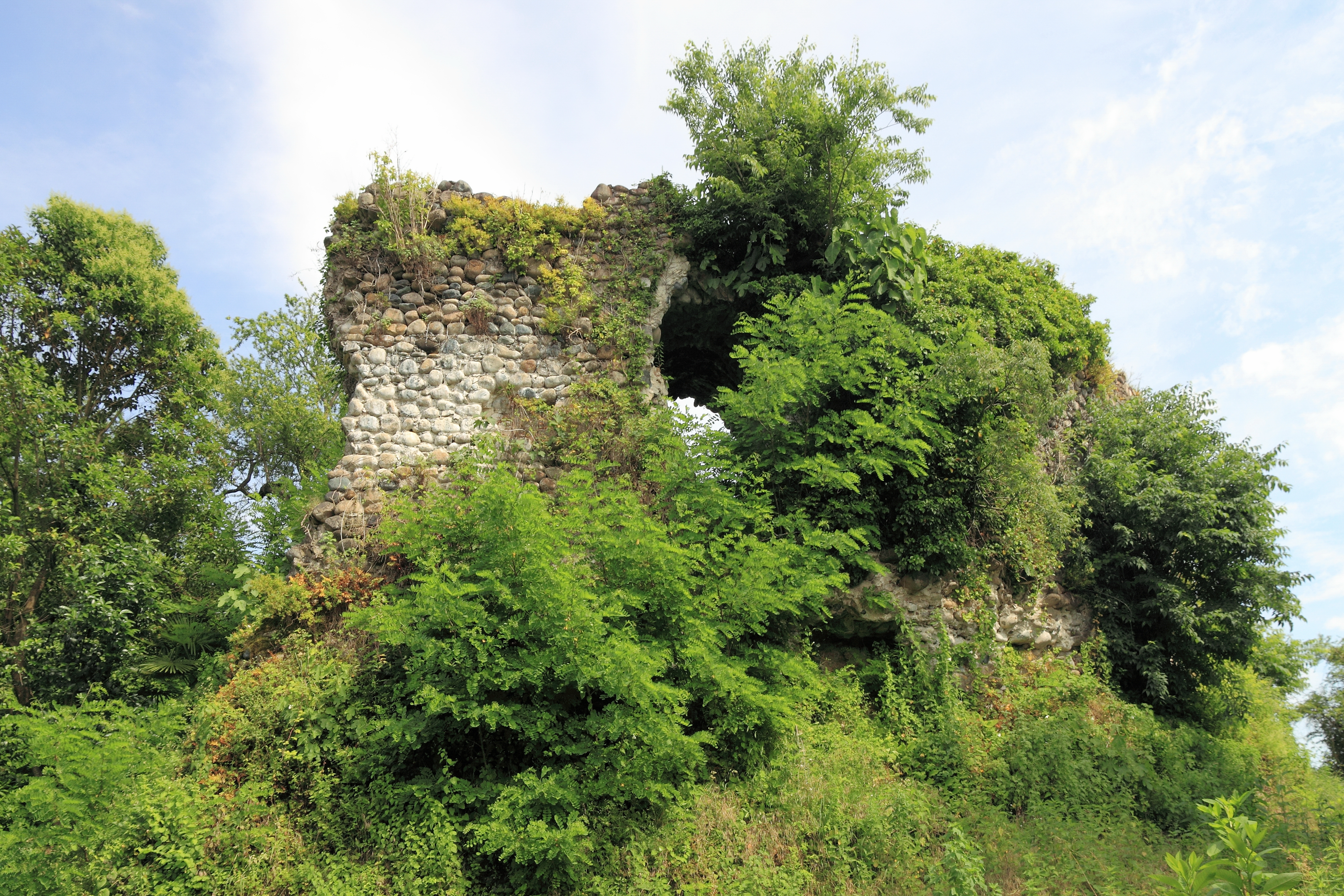
- Ruins of Bagrat's Castle in 2014.

- Location within Georgia

General information
- Type: Castle
- Location: Sokhumi, Georgia
- Coordinates: 43°00′01″N 41°02′46″E
- Destroyed: 16th century
- Landlord: House of Shervashidze, House of Dadiani

Bagrat's Castle (Georgian: ბაგრატის ციხე, romanized: bagrat'is tsikhe) is a ruined medieval castle near Sokhumi, Georgia’s breakaway republic of Abkhazia, close to the Black Sea coast. It is named after the Georgian king Bagrat, either Bagrat III or Bagrat IV, and traditionally dated to the late 10th or 11th century.

The castle stands in ruins on a hill on the left bank of the Basla (Besleti) river, in the south-eastern portion of Sokhumi, measuring 55 x 27 m in total area. The surviving structures are walls, rising to 10-12 m in height, of an oval-shaped edifice with a rectangular tower guarding the entrance gateway, which shows traces of tunnels. Archaeological digs, supervised by Mikhail Trapsh in the 1950s, revealed remains of fortified structures, wine jars, jugs, glazed pottery, and other items dating from the 12th to the 14th century.

The naming and dating of the castle is based on a local legend recorded in the 19th century, but architectural evidence suggests the structure can be of a later date, serving as the seat of the eristavi of Tskhumi, as Sokhumi was known in the Middle Ages. The historian Yuri Voronov also conjectured that castle might have hosted the queen-regnant Tamar of Georgia during her stays in Abkhazia in the early 13th century. It also functioned as a shelter for the local elite, including the Shervashidze family, in case of danger. In the 16th century, when the town's chief settlement moved to the west, on the right bank of the river, the castle was abandoned and left to fall in ruins.

Georgia has inscribed the castle on its registry of Cultural Monuments of National Significance and reported, in 2015, its condition as in urgent need of conservation.
