= Kardanakhi =

Kardenakhi კარდენახი Kardenakh
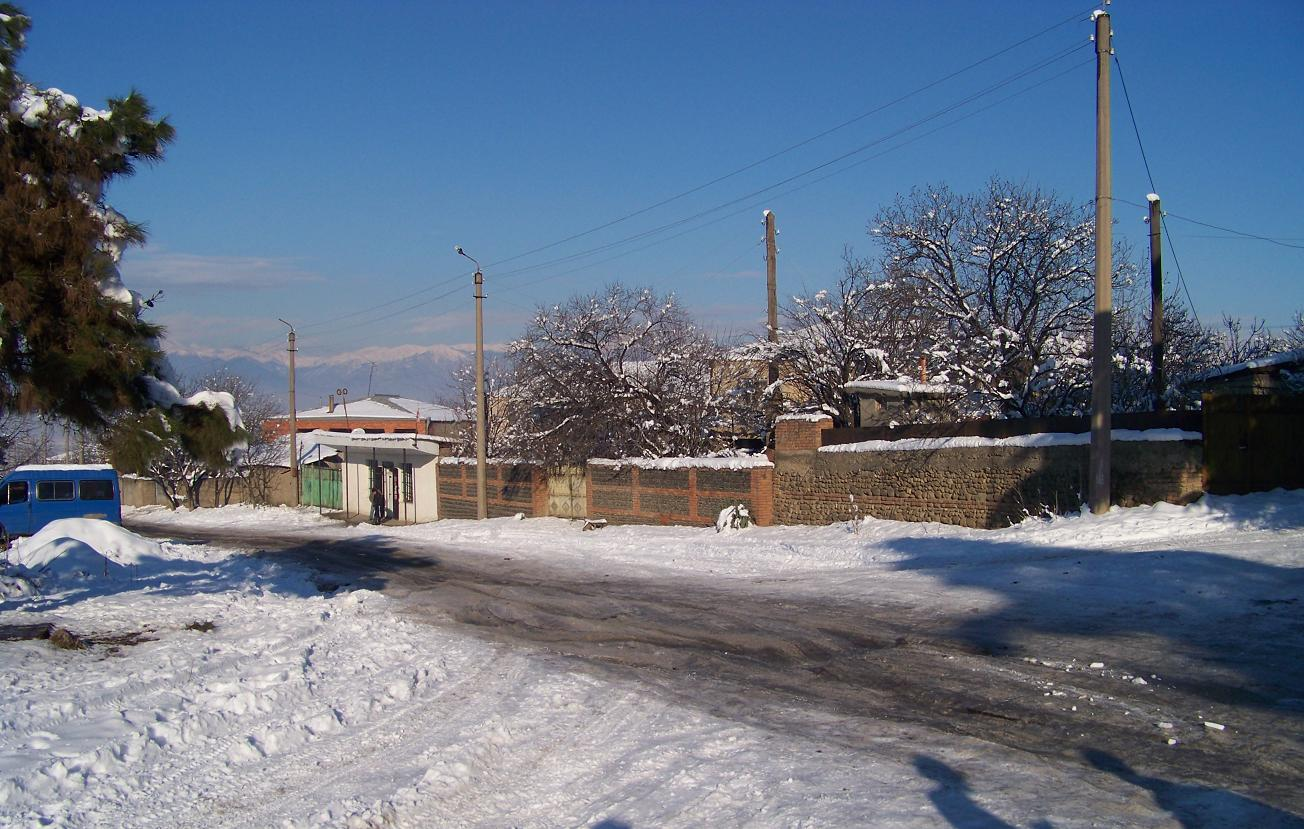

- Location in Georgia Kardenakhi (Kakheti)
- Coordinates: 41°40′20″N 45°53′13″E
- Country: Georgia
- Region: Kakheti
- Municipality: Gurjaani

Population 2014
  - Total: 3,873
- Time zone: UTC+4 (Georgian Time)

Kardenakhi (კარდენახი) also known as Kardanakhi is a village in Georgia, in the Gurjaani Municipality of the Kakheti region. It is located 510 meters above sea level on the northeastern slope of the Tsiv-Gombori Range, on the Bakurtsikhe-Tsnori highway, 14 kilometers from Gurjaani. According to the 2014 census, 3873 people live in the village.

== History ==
According to a local legend, in the 17th century a branch of the Sharvashidzes migrated from Abkhazia and settled in the village and they later took the surname Abkhazi. This account is supported by Ioane Bagrationi, who believed that the Abkhazi nobles came to Kakheti from Abkhazia. According to Ioane, In 1636 Teimuraz I of Kakheti received the Abkhazis as princes.

Kardenakhi is also referred to as Kardanakhi in historical sources. Many branches of agriculture are developed in the village, including agriculture, animal husbandry and viticulture. According to popular tradition, the name of the village Kardanakhi is related to "good vineyard" (Kargi - Good, Venakhi - Vineyard). According to Vakhushti Bagrationi, "Kardanakhi has vineyards in the east and the wine here is good". Ioane Bagrationi places the village in the Kiziki subregion of Kakheti. The army there had to stand under the banner of Bishop Bodbeli. Kardenakhi was originally part of the Kingdom of Georgia, and later it became a part of the Kingdom of Kakheti. From the end of the XVI-XVII centuries, separate feudal lords, Vachnadzes, Andronikashvilis and Abkhazis fought for influence in the region. Baratashvili princes also had estates in Kardenakhi. The feudal lords had disputes over estates, mills and palaces.

According to the agreement of 1719, King Vakhtang VI helped David II of Kakheti to fight against the invading Lezgin raiders. This army, under the command of a certain Kaflanishvili, moved to Kardenakhi and stood waiting here for a whole month. No fighting happened as David II of Kakheti neglected to ready his army to fight against the Lezgins.

In the second half of the 18th century, several cylindrical towers were built in the village by the royal government. In addition, the residents of Kardenakhi participated in the construction of the castle-towers of Signagi, where they could shelter themselves if necessary. One of the towers of Signagi Castle is called "Kardanakhisa Tower".

Ivane Javakhishvili mentions Kardenakhi among the villages in which the days of St. George were exceptionally celebrated.

== See also ==
- Kakheti
- Kote Abkhazi
