= Aleksandr Sharvashidze =

Russian scenic designer

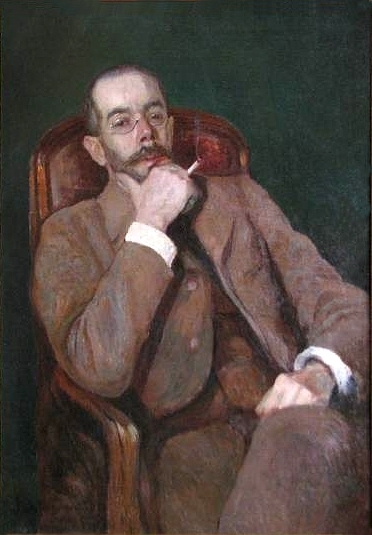
- 1913 portrait by Vladimir Rossinsky

Prince of Abkhazia
- Reign: 1918–1968
- Predecessor: Giorgi Mikhailovitch Sharvashidze
- Successor: George Vladimirovitch Shervashidze
- Born: Aleksandr Konstantinovich Chachba-Sharvashidze ალექსანდრე კონსტანტინის ძე შარვაშიძე Алеқсандр Константин-иҧа Чачба-Шарвашиӡе; 24 December [O.S. 12 December] 1867; Feodosia, Taurida Governorate, Russian Empire
- Died: 17 August 1968 (aged 100); Monte Carlo, Monaco
- Burial: Russian Orthodox Cemetery Nice (1968–1985); Sukhumi (1985–)
- House: House of Shervashidze
- Father: Prince Konstantine Giorgi Shervashidze
- Mother: Nathalie de Enloy de la Garde
- Occupation: Graphic designer; painter; scenographer; art critic

Prince Aleksandr Konstantinovich Chachba-Sharvashidze (Georgian: ალექსანდრე კონსტანტინის ძე შარვაშიძე; Abkhaz: Алеқсандр Константин-иҧа Чачба-Шарвашиӡе; 1867–1968) was a Georgian-Abkhazian Chachba, graphic designer, painter, scenographer and art critic.

Following the death of his cousin, Giorgi Mikhailovitch Sharvashidze in 1918, Sharvashidze succeed the Abkhazian throne in pretence. From 1920 onwards Sharvashidze lived in exile in Paris.

== Early life and family ==
Aleksandr Konstantinovich Chachba-Sharvashidze was born on 24 December [O.S. 12 December] 1867 in Feodosia, to Nathalie de Enloy de la Garde and Prince Konstantine Giorgi Shervashidze. Through his father Sharvashidze was a member of the House of Sharvashidze, the former ruling family of the Principality of Abkhazia.

Sharvashidze was the grandson of the Abkhazian ruler Sefer Ali-Bey Sharvashidze and great-grandson of Kelesh Ahmed-Bey Sharvashidze. Sharvashidze's father Constantine was part of the 1832 conspiracy of Georgian nobility against Russian rule.

== Career ==
From 1907 until 1918 Sharvashidze worked as a scenographer at the Mariinsky and Alexandrinsky theatres. He co-operated with Alexandre Benois, Aleksandr Golovin, Valentin Serov and Pablo Picasso.

=== Exile ===
Fellowing the Russian Revolution, Sharvashidze went into exile in France, and from 1920 lived in Paris.

== Personal life and legacy ==
On 17 August 1968 Sharvashidze died in Monte Carlo aged 100, and was initially buried at the Russian Orthodox Cemetery in Nice.

Sharvashidze requested for all his work to be left to Georgia after his death. On 12 May 1985, Sharvashidze was ceremonially reburied in the centre of the Abkhazian capital Sukhumi. On 24 December 2013, a monument was unveiled on his grave.

On 21 January 2024, the Central Exhibition Hall, in Sukhumi, which stored precious artworks from Abkhazia's National Art Gallery, burned down, resulting in the tragic loss of over four thousand artworks, including up to 300 pieces by Alexander Chachba-Shervashidze.

== See also ==
- List of Georgian princes (mtavars)

Aleksandr Sharvashidze House of Shervashidze/Chachba
Titles in pretence
Preceded by Giorgi	— TITULAR — Prince of Abkhazia; 1918–1968; Reason for succession failure: Principality incorporated into the Russian Empire in 1866	Succeeded by George
