= George Vladimirovitch Shervashidze =

Prince of Abkhazia

George Vladimirovitch Shervashidze (born 1894 in Vladimir, d. 1978 in Sofia), titular Prince of Abkhazia from 1968 after the death of his uncle.

He was a captain of the Russian army and fought in the First World War. He participated in the Yaroslavl uprising against the Bolsheviks and later emigrated to Bulgaria. He was married to Tatiana Afanasyevna Bendereva who was a doctor, born in Tbilisi in 1901.

== See also ==
- List of Georgian princes (mtavars)

George Vladimirovitch Shervashidze House of Shervashidze/Chachba
Titles in pretence
Preceded by Alexander	— TITULAR — Prince of Abkhazia; 1968–1978; Reason for succession failure: Principality incorporated into the Russian Empire in 1866	Succeeded by Nikita
