= Mikhail, Prince of Abkhazia =

Head of state of the Principality of Abkhazia (1806–1866)

Mikhail
- Prince of Abkhazia
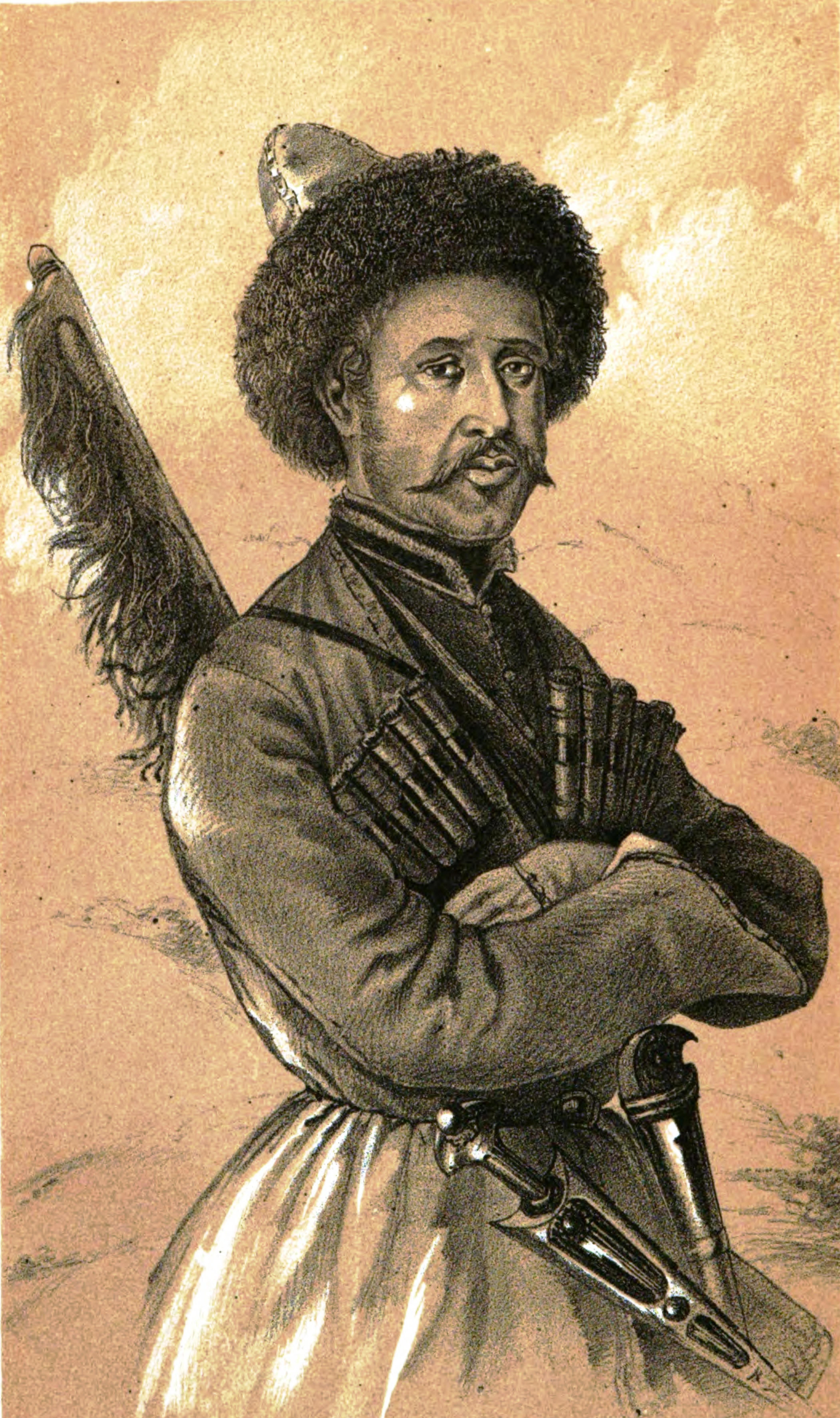
- Reign: 1823–1864
- Predecessor: Dmitry
- Successor: Giorgi II
- Born: 1806
- Died: April 1866 (aged 59–60); Voronezh
- Burial: Sukhumi
- Spouse: Princess Menika Dadiani; Princess Alexandra Dadiani
- Issue: Giorgi II
Names
- Mikhail Sharvashidze
- House: Sharvashidze
- Father: Prince Giorgi Sharvashidze
- Mother: Princess Tamara Dadiani

Mikhail, or Hamud Bey Sharvashidze-Chachba, from the House of Sharvashidze, (1806–1866) was the head of state of the Principality of Abkhazia and reigned from 1823 to 1864.

== Biography ==
Born into an old House of Sharvashidze, ruling family of Abkhazia, he was the son of Giorgi, Prince of Abkhazia and his wife, Princess Tamar Dadiani.

Mikhail, who was Orthodox Christian, came to power at a time when Abkhazia had only recently been declared a protectorate of Russia, as a result of the 1810 manifesto of Tsar Alexander I. During the Crimean War of 1853–55, Abkhazia was invaded by Turkey, and Mikhail was forced to declare his loyalty to Turkey. This came back to haunt him when, in 1864, the Russians accused him of cooperating with Turkey during the war. He was subsequently exiled to Voronezh, in Russia – an act which was vastly unpopular with the Abkhaz people.

Mikhail's deportation, and death not long after, also marked the beginning of the end for Abkhazian self-governance for the next 140 years. In June 1864, the Princedom was abolished and replaced by the Sukhumi Military Sector. In 1866, a popular uprising declared Mikhail's son Giorgi a Prince, but this was short-lived.

== Personal life ==
Mikhail married two times.

He married first Princess Menika Nikolaevna Dadiani, former wife of Prince Tsereteli, and only child of Prince Niko Giorgievitch Dadiani of Mingrelia. He married secondly her cousin, Princess Alexandra Giorgievna Dadiani (1829-1898), eldest daughter of Captain-Lieutenant Prince Giorgi Nikolaevitch Dadiani of Mingrelia. Prince Mikhail had issue from both marriages; three sons and four daughters:

- Prince Nikolai Mikhailovitch Sharvashidze. He died young.
- H.S.H. Prince Giorgi Mikhailovitch, Prince of Abkhazia
- H.S.H. Prince Mikhail Mikhailovitch Shervashidze (d. 1899) Granted the personal style of His Serene Highness by Imperial ukase 21st August 1834.
- Princess Ana Mikhailovna Sharvashidze, married Prince Giorgi Levanovitch Gurieli. She had issue
- Princess Nino Mikhailovna Sharvashidze (d. 1867), married Prince Marshania of Tselebi [Shereem Bey]
- H.S.H. Princess Tamara Mikhailovna Sharvashidze (1846-1926) married Prince Nikolai Elizbarovitch Dadiani (1829-1879). She had issue, one son and three daughters
- Princess Varvara Barba Mikhailovna Sharvashidze (1859-1946), Maid of Honour to the Empress of Russia, married as his second wife, H.E. Baron Alexander Felixovitch von Meyendorff (1869-1964)

== See also ==
- Russification

Mikhail, Prince of Abkhazia House of Sharvashidze
Regnal titles
Preceded by Dmitry	Prince of Abkhazia; 1823–1864	Succeeded by Giorgi II
