= Manuchar Sharvashidze =

Prince of Abkhazia

Manuchar
- Prince of Abkhazia
- Reign: circa 1730–57
- Predecessor: Rostom
- Successor: Manuchar II
- Issue: Kelesh Bey, Prince of Abkhazia
Names
- Manuchar Shervashidze/Chachba
- House: Shervashidze/Chachba

Manuchar I, or Manch I, was a prince of the Principality of Abkhazia from circa 1730 to 1757.

== Biography ==
By birth member of the House of Sharvashidze, family that ruled Abkhazia for centuries, he was the eldest son of Hamid Bey Shirvashidze, Prince of Abkhazia (d. 1730).

Manuchar was forcefully deposed from the throne by Ottoman Turkey and sent into exile to that empire, where he converted to Islam together with his brothers Levan, Shirvan and Zurab.

His son, Kelesh Ahmed-Bey Sharvashidze, also became a ruling Prince in 1780.

Manuchar Sharvashidze House of Sharvashidze
Regnal titles
Preceded by Rostom Sharvashidze	Prince of Abkhazia circa 1730–57	Succeeded by Manuchar II
