= Abkhazi =

Princely family in Georgia

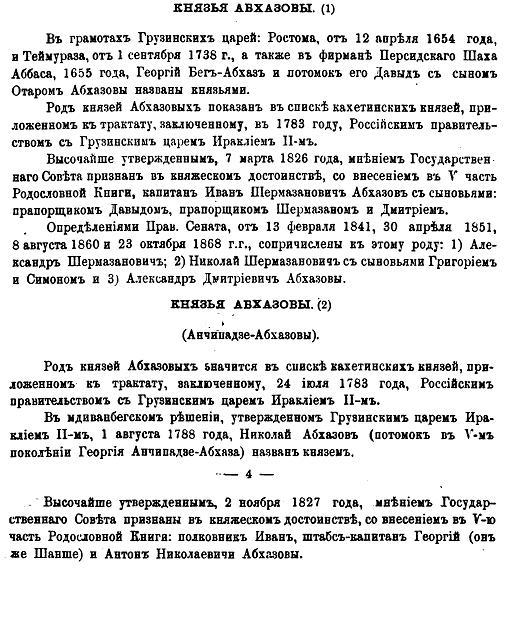
Register of Princes Abkhazi in the Russian nobility book (1892)

The House of Apkhazi (Georgian: აფხაზი, Russian: Абхази; also known as Abkhazishvili) was a princely family in Georgia, a branch of the Shervashidze family from Abkhazia.

== History ==
According to the genealogical treatise by Prince Ioann of Georgia (1768-1830), the ancestors of the family fled the Islamicization of Abkhazia to the eastern Georgian Kingdom of Kakheti where they were elevated, in 1636, to the princely dignity and enfeoffed by the king Teimuraz I with the estate at Kardenakhi, which had hitherto been in possession of the extinct line of the Vachnadze family.

After the Russian annexation of the Kingdom of Georgia, the family (Russian: Абхази, Абхазовы) was integrated into Russian princely nobility in 1826.

In the wake of the Russian Revolution of 1917, Prince Konstantine Abkhazi, the head of the house, presided over the decision of the Assembly of Georgian Nobility to declare their property national. He then led an anti-Soviet opposition group, and was executed by the Bolsheviks in 1923.

Prince Nicholas Abkhazi (died 1987) and his Shanghai-born wife Peggy Pemberton Carter (died 1994) moved to Canada and, beginning from 1946, built the well-known "Abkhazi Garden" in the city of Victoria, British Columbia on Vancouver Island.

== See also ==
- Ivane Abkhazi
- Machabeli
- List of Georgian princely families
