= Nikita Georgevitch Shervashidze =

Bulgarian politician

Nikita Georgevitch Shervashidze (1941–2008) was a Bulgarian politician. He served as the Minister of Energy in the 1990s.

Due to his descendancy from the historical ruling family of Abkhazia, the House of Shervashidze, he represented the interests of Abkhazia in Bulgaria during his later years. He was married to Lilyane Mileva of Bulgarian-Greek descendancy. They had a son Andrew.

== See also ==
- List of Georgian princes (mtavars)

Nikita Georgevitch Shervashidze House of Shervashidze/Chachba
Titles in pretence
Preceded by George	— TITULAR — Prince of Abkhazia; 1978–2008; Reason for succession failure: Principality incorporated into the Russian Empire in 1866	Succeeded by Andrew
