= Giorgi Mikhailovitch Sharvashidze =

Prince of Abkhazia

Mikhail
- Prince of Abkhazia
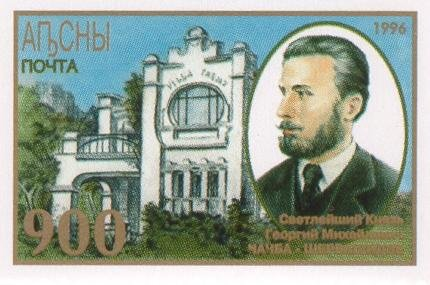
- In 1996, the Abkhazian post issued a commemorative stamp for Prince Giorgi.
- Reign: 1866–1918
- Predecessor: Mikhail
- Successor: Alexander
- Born: 1846; Sukhumi
- Died: 1918 (aged 71-72)
- Burial: Sukhumi, Sukhumi District, Abkhazia
- Spouse: Elena Erastovna Andreevskaya
Names
- Giorgi Sharvashidze
- House: Sharvashidze
- Father: Prince Mikhail Sharvashidze
- Mother: Princess Alexandra Dadiani

Prince Giorgi Mikhailovitch Sharvashidze (b. 1846, d. 1918), was titular Prince of Abkhazia.

== Biography ==
Born in Sukhumi, into an old House of Sharvashidze, ruling family of Abkhazia, he was the son of Mikhail, Prince of Abkhazia by his second wife, Princess Alexandra Dadiani.

He was educated at the Page Corps, Saint Petersburg and later became Aide-de-camp to Grand Duke Michael Nikolaevich of Russia in 1866.

Proclaimed as Prince of Abkhazia at Sukhumi, by the people after an uprising against the Russians, 29 July 1866. Arrested and deported to Orenburg.

He was granted the right to return to Abkhazia in 1905, but he lived the rest of his life in Kutaisi.

== Personal life ==
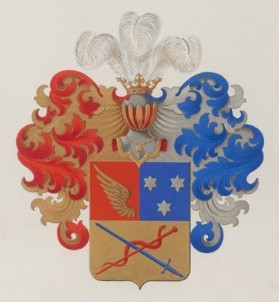
Coat of arms of the Andreevskiy family

Giorgi was married to Elena Erastovna Andreevskaya (1846-1918), member of an untitled Russian nobility.

She was an eldest child and elder daughter of Erast Stepanovich Andreyevskiy (1809-1872), doctor, writer, official state adviser and a spokesman for the Odessa City Duma, and his wife, Princess Varvara Georgiyevna Tumanova (d. 1876), member of an ancient Russianized Georgian princely family. Her father, Erast Stepanovich Andreyevskiy, was also a founder of the Kuialnyk Estuary resort.

The marriage produced no children.

== Death ==
Giorgi died in 1918. His body was buried in Lykhny Cemetery, Sukhumi, Sukhumi District, Abkhazia, Georgia.

== Ancestry ==
Ancestors of Giorgi Mikhailovitch Sharvashidze

16. Prince Mancha II Sharvashidze
8. Prince Kelesh Ahmed Bey Sharvashidze
4. Prince Giorgi Sharvashidze
2. Prince Mikhail Giorgievitch Sharvashidze
20. Prince Otia I Dadiani
10. Prince Katsia II Dadiani
21. Princess Gulkhana Chkeidze
5. Princess Tamara Dadiani
22. Prince Paata Tsulukidze
11. Princess Anna Tsulukidze
1. Prince Giorgi Mikhailovitch Sharvashidze
24. Prince Giorgi Otia Dadiani
12. Prince Nikolai Giorgievitch Dadiani
25. Princess Mariam Abashidze
6. Prince Giorgi Nikolaevitch Dadiani
26. Prince Rustam Sharvashidze
13. Princess Mariam Sharvashidze
3. Princess Alexandra Giorgievna Dadiani
28. Prince Nikolai Dadeshkeliani
14. Prince Islam Bey Dadeshkeliani
7. Princess Barbara Dadeshkeliani

Giorgi Mikhailovitch Sharvashidze House of Sharvashidze
Titles in pretence
Preceded by Mikhail	— TITULAR — Prince of Abkhazia; 1866–1918; Reason for succession failure: Principality incorporated into the Russian Empire in 1866	Succeeded by Alexander
