= Rabia Sharvashidze =

- Succeeded by: Solomon I

Personal details
- Parent: Argunai (father)

Rabia Sharvazhidze (Georgian რაბია, Abkhaz Рабиа) was the second ruling prince of the Principality of Abkhazia and a member of the House of Sharvashidze. He ruled from circa 1451 to 1465.

Not much about his life is known. He was mentioned in a letter by King George VIII to Philip the Good in 1459 regarding the Georgian coalition against the Ottoman Empire.
