= Abkhazi Garden =

Public garden in Victoria, British Columbia, Canada

Coordinates: 48°24′58″N 123°19′36″W

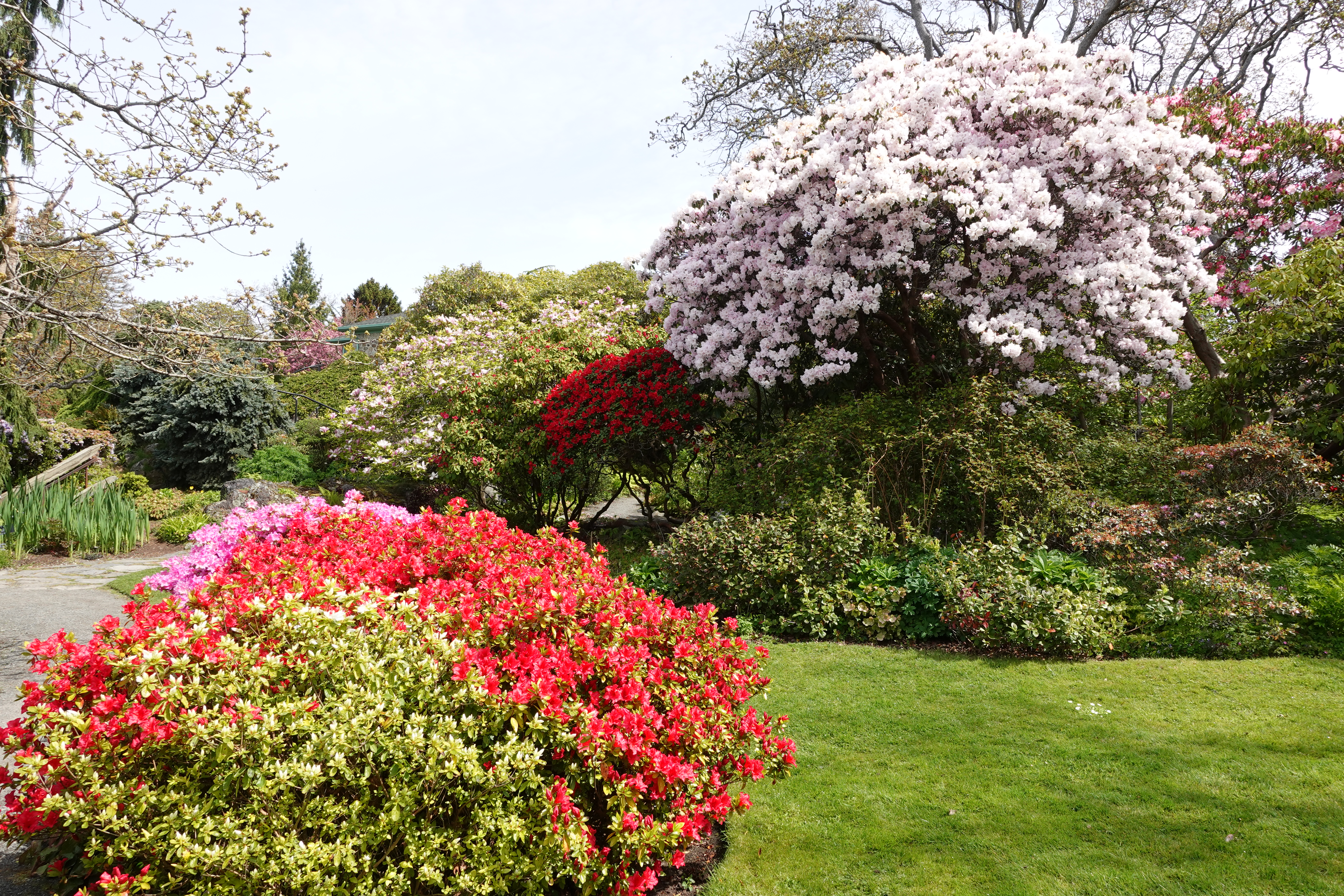
The colourful rhododendrons at Abkhazi Garden, Victoria, British Columbia, Canada

The Abkhazi Garden was created in Victoria, British Columbia on Vancouver Island, in 1946 by Prince and Princess Abkhazi. The garden is known as 'the garden that love built.' It was developed by Prince Nicolas Abkhazi and Princess Marjorie ('Peggy') Abkhazi (born Marjorie Mable Jane Carter, later Marjorie Mable Jane Pemberton-Carter) over the decades that they owned the property on Fairfield Road.

Prince Nicolas Abkhazi fled the Soviet Union's Republic of Georgia for France soon after the start of the Russian Revolution. He met Peggy there in 1922. During World War Two he joined the French army and was captured as a prisoner of war by the Germans. Meanwhile, Peggy had returned to Shanghai where she was interned by the Japanese from 1943 to 1945. They were reunited in New York in 1946 and later moved to Victoria, British Columbia, Canada where they remained the rest of their lives. Not long after their deaths the garden was purchased by The Land Conservancy of British Columbia with plans to steward the land as a garden in perpetuity to memorialize and share the story of the Prince and Princess Abkhazi.

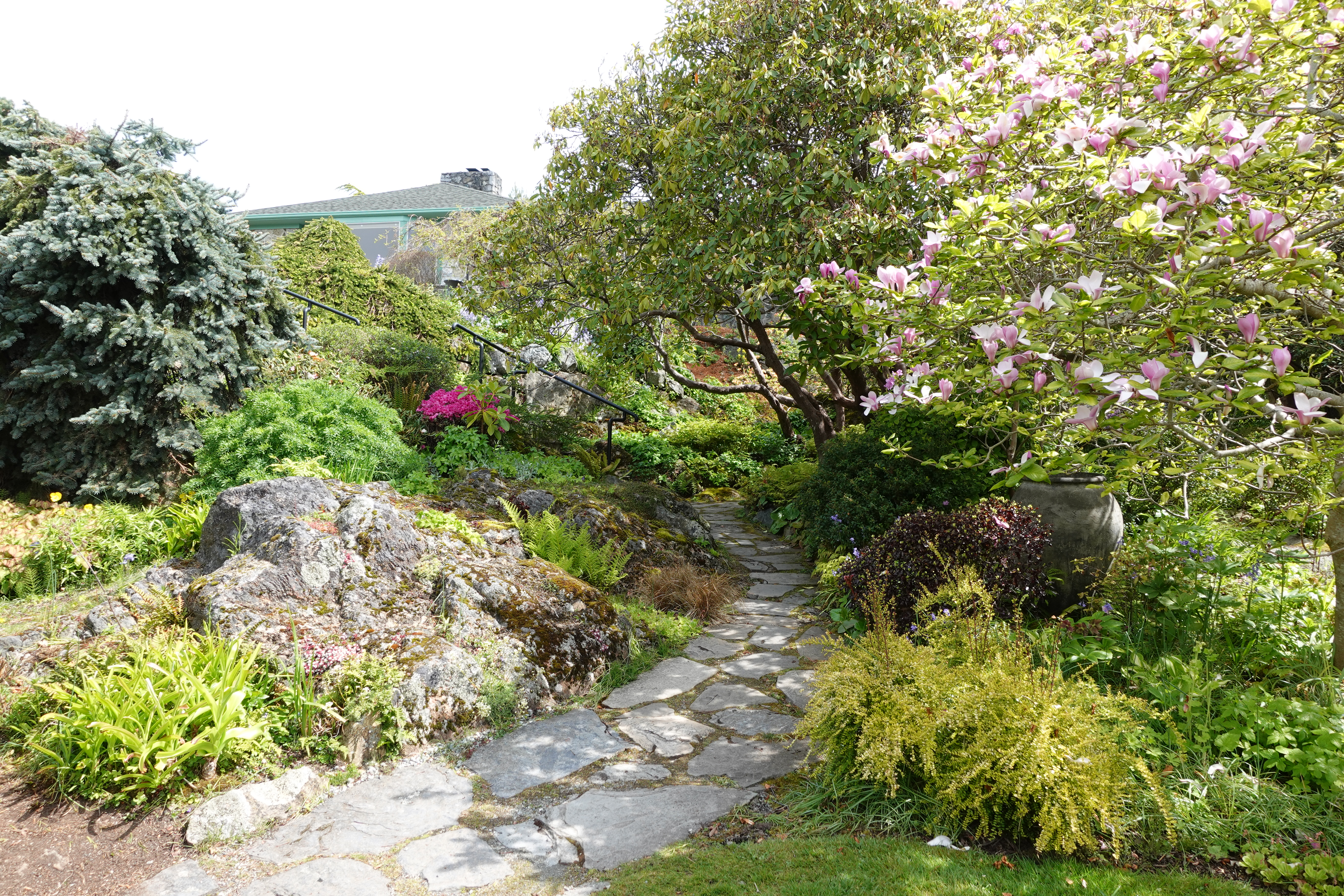
The tea house at Abkhazi garden, as seen from the garden below.

The garden is approximately one acre and features pathways of crushed gravel and stone paths that wind their way under rhododendron plants with different coloured flowers that have grown to the size of trees. Under the rhododendrons grow smaller flowers, ferns, and other shade tolerant plants. In the centre of the garden is a tea house and gift shop.

A proposal was submitted in March 2022 to protect the garden by transferring the denser zoning of the property to a nearby property and submission of a request to officially recognize the property as a heritage property in the city of Victoria. This is after the city tried to impose a heritage designation that met resistance from The Land Conservancy of British Columbia while it underwent restructuring and sought to sell some properties to maintain financial stability. The Land Conservancy was later able to sell the parking spot that had been heritage designated by the city on Foul Bay Road and no longer required creditor protection by 2017. The fee to enter the Abkhazi garden is by a suggested donation of $10.
