= Gogi Tatukhashvili =

Georgian military officer (born 1959)

Gogi Tatukhashvili (Georgian: გოგი თათუხაშვილი; born 18 September 1959) is a retired Georgian police and military officer, lieutenant-general (2004). He commanded the Internal Troops of Georgia from 2003 to 2004.

Born in Tbilisi, Tatukhashvili graduated from the Georgian Technical University in 1983 and Tbilisi Police School in 1989. He then served in the Ministry of Internal Affairs of Georgia on various positions. From 2001 to 2002, he commanded the Special Task Unit of the Ministry of Justice of Georgia. He was chief of security detail for the Georgian politician Mikheil Saakashvili, who led opposition protests during the November 2003 Rose Revolution. After the change of power in favor of the revolution's leaders, Tatukhashvili was appointed as commander of the Internal Troops of Georgia and promoted to the rank of lieutenant-general. A year later, in November 2004, the Internal Troops were transformed into the 4th Infantry Brigade of the Defense Ministry and Tatukhashvili became the commander of this brigade. In January 2006, he was appointed as commander of the National Guard of Georgia, but he resigned ten days later, citing his desire to retire. The Georgian media alleged Tatakhashvili's resignation was brought about by his disagreement with the then-Defense Minister Irakli Okruashvili. He was awarded with the Order of Vakhtang Gorgasali, the 3rd and 2nd Class, in 1993 and 2004, respectively.

In March 2014, Tatukhashvili's 33-year-old son, Shalva, a former special forces officer, died shortly after being questioned as a witness in a criminal case against his former superior, Data Akhalaia. The Tatukhashvili family insisted the death was a result of mistreatment by investigators in order to extract false testimony and accused the Georgian Dream coalition government of covering up the case, while the Prosecutor's office maintained autopsy results indicated an acute respiratory failure, caused by alcohol intoxication in combination with psychoactive drugs.
