= Zegnak Sharvashidze =

Prince of Abkhazia

Zegnak
- Prince of Abkhazia
- Reign: circa 1665 – 1700
- Predecessor: Sustar
- Successor: Rostom
- Issue: Rostom Sharvashidze; Jikeshia, Lord of Abzhua; Kvapu, Lord of Samurzakhano
Names
- Zegnak Sharvashidze
- House: Sharvashidze

Prince Zegnak Sharvashidze, was a prince of the Principality of Abkhazia, which ruled from circa 1665 to 1700.

== Biography ==
He was born into the House of Sharvashidze, ruling family of Abkhazia. After Zegnak's death, the Principality of Abkhazia was divided amongst his sons, with his eldest son Rostom Prince of the rump Principality in Bzyb and the separate duchies of Abzhua and Samurzakhano falling to his other sons Jikeshia and Kvapu.

Zegnak Sharvashidze House of Shervashidze/Chachba
Regnal titles
Preceded by Sustar	Prince of Abkhazia circa 1665 - 1700	Succeeded by Rostom
