= Otagho II Sharvashidze =

- Duke of Abkhazia
- Predecessor: Otagho I
- Successor: Dardin
- Born: unknown
- Died: 1213
- Noble family: House of Sharvashidze

Otagho II Sharvashidze (Georgian: ოთაღო შარვაშიძე) (d. 1213) was a 12–13th century Georgian noble.

== Biography ==
Otagho Sharvashidze was born during the second half of the 12th century to duke Otagho I and his unknown wife. During his youth, he was titled as a "duke of Tskhumi" and succeeded his father on the throne of Abkhazia. Nothing else is known about his reign except that he died in 1213. Following his death an interregnum began for a few years, until his son Dardin acquired the throne.
