= Zurab Sharvashidze =

Ruler of Abkhazia

Zurab Sharvashidze (Georgian: ზურაბ შარვაშიძე; also known as Suraba Bey) was the ruling Prince of Abkhazia around 1770–1780.

== Biography ==
He was the youngest son of Manuchar Sharvashidze. Zurab was banished, along with his father and brothers, by the Sultan of Turkey 1757. He later joined his brother in the revolt against Turkish rule, but was deposed by his nephew in 1779 or 1780.

During his tenure, he attacked Odishi during the Battle of Rukhi, which was then ruled by Katsia II Dadiani, to which the prince requested Solomon I of Imereti's help.

Zurab Sharvashidze House of Sharvashidze
Regnal titles
Preceded by Manuchar II	Prince of Abkhazia circa 1770–1780	Succeeded by Kelesh Ahmed-Bey
