= Internal Troops of Georgia =

- საქართველოს შინაგანი ჯარები
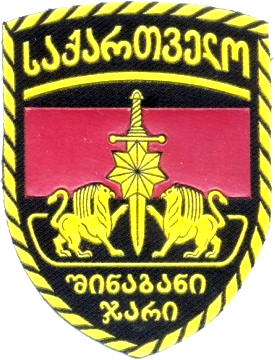
- Patch of the Georgian Internal Troops, c. 1997.
- Active: 12 September 1991 – November 2004
- Country: Georgia
- Branch: Georgian Ministry of Internal Affairs
- Type: Gendarmerie
- Size: 5,000–7,000 (end of 1995)
- Garrison/HQ: Tbilisi, Georgia
- Engagements: Georgian Civil War

The Internal Troops of Georgia (Georgian: საქართველოს შინაგანი ჯარები, sak'art'velos shinagani jarebi, lit. 'Georgia's Inside Soldiers') was the militarized gendarmerie-like force in Georgia from 1991 to 2004. It was subordinated to the Ministry of Internal Affairs, the police authority of the country.

== History ==
The Internal Troops of Georgia were formed on 12 September 1991, five months after the nation's declaration of independence from the Soviet Union. They descended from the Soviet Union's Internal Troops. They were tasked with aiding the Ministry of Internal Affairs in security measures, fighting against organized crime, terrorism, and subversion, as well as safeguarding—independently or with other law enforcement agencies—important facilities and special cargoes, and, finally, with participating in the country's defense during wartime. The Internal Troops were staffed primarily through conscription but were also partially contract-based.

The Internal Troops saw action in various conflicts and operations during the post-Soviet unrest in Georgia, including in South Ossetia (1991–1992, 2004), Abkhazia (1992–1993), and the Pankisi Gorge crisis (2002). By the end of 1995 the force had some 5,000 to 7,000 troops in its ranks, making it the third largest military structure in Georgia after the Russian troops occupying parts of the country at that time and the Georgian Armed Forces. The Internal Troops included patrol units, a special subdivision for guarding prisons, the 1st Operational Motor-Rifle Brigade in Tbilisi, the 2nd Operational Motor-Rifle Brigade in Kutaisi, the Batumi separate battalion, and a helicopter unit with at least 2 MI-8s. They had at least 10 heavy and light tanks and antitank weapons. The official budget in 1997 amounted to 5,312 GEL (c. US$4.2 million); official salaries were low and the reports of corruption were widespread.

=== Demise ===
In the framework of the post-Rose Revolution reforms in Georgia's military and security forces, in November 2004, the Internal Troops were abolished and all its munitions and infrastructure were transferred to the Ministry of Defense. A bulk of the Interior Troops personnel formed the 4th Infantry Brigade of the Georgian Land Forces.

== Commanders ==
- Jondo Tabatadze, Colonel, Chief of the Directorate of the Internal Troops of Georgia (1991)
- Ivane Chelidze, Colonel, Commander (1991–1992)
- Gela Lanchava, Major-General, Commander (1992–1993)
- Vladimer Chikovani, Major-General, Commander (1993–1994)
- Gia Toradze, Major-General, Commander (1994–1995)
- Pavle Norakidze, Colonel, Acting Commander (1995–1996)
- Giorgi Shervashidze, Lieutenant-General, Commander (1996–2003)
- Gogi Tatukhashvili, Lieutenant-General, Commander (2003–2004)
