= Tsebelda culture =

Tsebelda culture is a late antiquity to early medieval archaeological culture in the territory of the Apsilae or Tsebelda tribe, located in Abkhazia, Georgia on the Black Sea coast. The culture is known mainly from excavation of burial sites, starting in 1959, which yielded a large collection of artefacts.

== Discovery ==
The majority of the artifacts presently located at the Abkhaz Federal Museum in Sukhumi were found in 1959 by local schoolboy (Yuri Voronov), who later became a prominent archaeologist and Caucasiologist. He collected and saved from destruction over a thousand objects of Tsebelda culture, including spears, axes, jewelry, glass, and clay vessels.

The findings of the young archaeologist interested scientists, and systematic archaeological excavations of the monuments and treasures of Tsebelda culture began as early as 1960. An archaeological expedition led by M. M. Trapsh produced the first excavations of the necropolis of this culture at one of fortresses, referred to as the "Hat".

The first reasonably complete publications appeared in 1970–1971. Scientific reports were prepared by archaeologists IN.L. Lekvinadze, M.M. Trapsh, Str.T.O. Shamba, M.M. Gunba, and YU.N. Raven, giving a full picture of the Tsebelda culture of the ancient Apsilae.

== Dating ==
On the basis of the artifacts found, the necropoles in the Tsebelda culture are attributed mainly to the first to fifth centuries CE. Voronov identifies the ethnicity of the population that used the necropoles as members of the ancient Abkhazian tribes Apsilae and Abasci.

Materials found at Raskopannoye (Russian: раскопанное), a rich burial site with Byzantine coins of Justinian I (reigned 527–565), have contradicted previous erroneous dating. Tsebelda burial grounds ceased to function at the end of seventh to the beginning of eighth centuries, as a consequence of the Arab invasions of the first half of the eighth century.

One layer of the site was dated to the first through third centuries via the examination of one- and two-part brooches, small glass beads, Roman silver coins with the image of the emperors Nerva, Trajan, Hadrian, and Antoninus Pius, and other items. A second burial site contains artifacts dating to the fourth and fifth centuries, including glass vials, amphorae, Roman silver coins with the image of the emperor Julia Domna, fibulae, a brooch, a cross bow, and a jug with an ovoid shape adorned with a cross in the early Christian style.

== Burials ==
Between 1960 and 1962, archaeologists unearthed more than 100 graves, six of which were of horses. Monuments were also unearthed dating from the beginning of the sixth century BCE. The graves were differentiated into two types. The majority, some 82 per cent of cases, have an elongated rectangular burial pit. The dead were laid on their backs with their heads to the northwest or the southwest. In the remaining eighteen per cent of the burials, the dead were cremated, along with their ornaments. The cremation was performed off-site, and the ashes were placed in red clay urns with two looped handles.

== Weapons ==
A large number of weapons were found in the excavations, including single- and double-bladed swords, many daggers, unique axes, arrowheads, and shields. The axes, dated from the first through nineteenth centuries, are considered particularly characteristic of the Tsebelda culture.

== See also ==
- K.I. Berdzenishvili. "Pottery from the Late Tsebelda. Materials on the archeology of Georgia and the Caucasus". Institute of History. IA Javakhishvili of Georgia SSR. 11. Tbilisi. 1959. page 108 et seq.
- I.A. Gzelishvili. "Remains of cremation in clay jars in Abkhazia". Journal of the Georgian Academy of Sciences, Vol VIII, Tbilisi, 1947, pp. 93–99.
- M.M. Trapsh. "Some results of the excavations Tsebelda cemeteries in 1960-1962". Archaeology and Ethnography of Abkhazia.
- Yuri Voronov. "New materials from the vicinity of ancient times Dioskuriady". Soviet Archaeology, 1991, Issue 1, pp. 225–234
- Yuri Voronov, Yushin, V.A. "New monuments Tsebelda culture in Abkhazia". Soviet Archaeology, 1973, Issue 1, pp. 171–191
- Yuri Voronov. Ancient Apsilia. Sukhumi, 1998
