= Giorgi Shervashidze (police general) =

Georgian politician

Giorgi "Gia" Shervashidze (Georgian: გიორგი [გია] შერვაშიძე, born 10 February 1955) is a Georgian politician and retired Lieutenant-General of Police. He commanded the Internal Troops of Georgia from 1996 to 2003.

== Police and military career ==
Born in Zugdidi and descended from a noble Georgian-Abkhaz family, Shervashidze graduated from the Tbilisi High Military School in 1974 and Moscow Frunze Military Academy in 1993. He joined the ranks of the Soviet-era police, militsiya, in 1978 and continued his service in police of independent Georgia in 1991. Having served as Vice-Rector of Police Academy from 1992 to 1994, he then held commanding positions in the Internal Troops and became promoted to major-general in 1996. That year, he was appointed as commander of the Internal Troops of Georgia and in 2002 oversaw a special police operation to clear Georgia's Pankisi Gorge of infiltrating Islamist elements fighting against Russia in neighboring Chechnya. He was decorated with the Order of Vakhtang Gorgasali, 3rd Class.

== Political career ==
After the change of power in Georgia as a result of the November 2003 Rose Revolution, Shervashidze was dismissed from service. He became involved in politics in 2007 and made an unsuccessful bid to run for presidency in the 2008 election, but the Georgian election authorities refused to register his candidacy on account of his lack of required number of supporters. He later emerged as one of the leaders of the opposition Christian-Democratic Alliance, which ran, unsuccessfully, in the May 2008 parliamentary election. In June 2008, he was attacked and beaten by four masked men. Shervashidze blamed the government for the attack and cited his independent "public diplomacy" with the Abkhaz side as a reason.
