= The Land Conservancy of British Columbia =

Land trust in British Columbia, Canada

The Land Conservancy of British Columbia (TLC)
- Founded: 1997; Victoria, British Columbia, Canada
- Type: Non-governmental organization
- Purpose: Environment, Culture, History
- Location: Victoria, British Columbia, Canada
- Region served: British Columbia
- Method: covenants
- Key people: Dianna Stenberg, Executive Director; Jeff Sheldrake, Chair of the Board of Directors
- Revenue: $ $5,866,451
- Website: http://www.conservancy.bc.ca

The Land Conservancy of British Columbia (TLC) is a not-for-profit, charitable land trust based in British Columbia, Canada.

The purpose of the Society is to protect plants, animals, natural communities and landscape features that represent diversity of life on earth, by protecting the lands and waters they need to survive, and to protect areas of scientific, historical, cultural, scenic or compatible recreation value. This is accomplished by acquiring protective control of these lands and waters through ownership of the land or conservation covenants. As of 2024, TLC protects 9 properties and 250 conservation covenants across BC, comprising more than 15,000 acres.

The Land Conservancy achieves its conservation objectives by working in a non-confrontational, businesslike manner. TLC works with many partners, all levels of government, other agencies, businesses, community groups and individuals to ensure the broadest support for its activities. The goal of TLC is to protect and restore the biological diversity of British Columbia for present and future generations through action and education

The Land Conservancy draws much of its finances from membership revenue. It is operated by both paid staff and a large network of volunteers. It has an office in Victoria.

== History ==
TLC was formed in 1997 with the help of Briony Penn. TLC has strong influences from The National Trust of England, Ireland and Wales, with whom it partakes in staff exchanges.

South Winchelsea Island, a 25-acre (100,000 m^{2}) island near Nanaimo, was The Land Conservancy's first acquisition. It is important habitat for Steller sea lions and several migratory bird species. The property has since been transferred to The Nature Trust of British Columbia for continued stewardship.

Music star Nelly Furtado has been a strong supporter of the work of the TLC. The Land Conservancy first contacted Furtado when they discovered her interest in the Sooke Potholes, a place she used to enjoy as a child. The singer has been involved in the campaign to protect and promote the area ever since. In 2015, TLC transferred the three parcels it continued to own at the Sooke Potholes to the Capital Regional District (CRD) to become public parkland.

=== Mascot ===
The harlequin duck is the symbol of the Land Conservancy of British Columbia. The harlequin ranges throughout BC, from rocky coastal shores and islets to turbulent inland mountain creeks and calm lakes. A vulnerable species, the harlequin population is endangered due to habitat loss and degradation. The plucky harlequin is said to be an inspiration for the TLC to persevere in overcoming their obstacles.

=== Creditor protection ===
On October 7, 2013, TLC filed for protection under the Companies Creditors Arrangement Act (CCAA) to definitively resolve the organization’s long-standing financial problems. Under CCAA, TLC is working with land consultants to assess all properties and develop a plan consistent with TLC’s conservancy mandate and its objective to repay creditors to the greatest extent possible.

The CCAA process is conducted under the review of an independent, court appointed monitor and under the supervision of a judge of the Supreme Court of British Columbia.

On April 2, 2015, The Supreme Court of B.C. approved the Plan of Arrangement and Compromise as agreed upon by The Land Conservancy of B.C. (TLC) and its creditors. The Court-approved Plan of Arrangement will see secured creditors paid in full, have their secured debt assumed by a third party, or receive the mortgaged property in settlement of their secured debt, within six months. Unsecured creditors will receive payouts of the fullest extent possible in multiple tranches.

TLC’s Plan contains a multi-faceted approach to eliminating the debt. It includes innovative approaches such as density transfers, specified donations, heritage revitalization agreements, mortgage transfers, and partnership agreements with other Land Trusts and Societies. The transfers will see the original donor’s intentions upheld and TLC's sites protected.

In an effort to stave off bankruptcy, the Conservancy entered into a sale agreement for property containing the architecturally and historically significant B.C. Binning house in Victoria. In January 2014, a B.C. court blocked the sale. The house has been returned to the original estate and is no longer owned by TLC.

The Conservancy was also looking for a buyer for its Keating Farm Property in 2014. On March 4, 2014, the Supreme Court of B.C. approved the sale of Keating Farm to Georgios and Rebecca Papadopoulos, who have plans to restore the old farm house and work with tenant farmers to continue farming the land currently in the Agricultural Land Reserve (ALR).

On December 2, 2016, TLC held its final meeting with creditors to seek approval of its revised Plan of Arrangement and Compromise (POA) and the conclusion of its time under the Companies’ Creditors Arrangement Act (CCAA). In a supportive vote, creditors approved the non-profit’s POA and subsequent exiting of creditor protection.

== Projects and properties ==
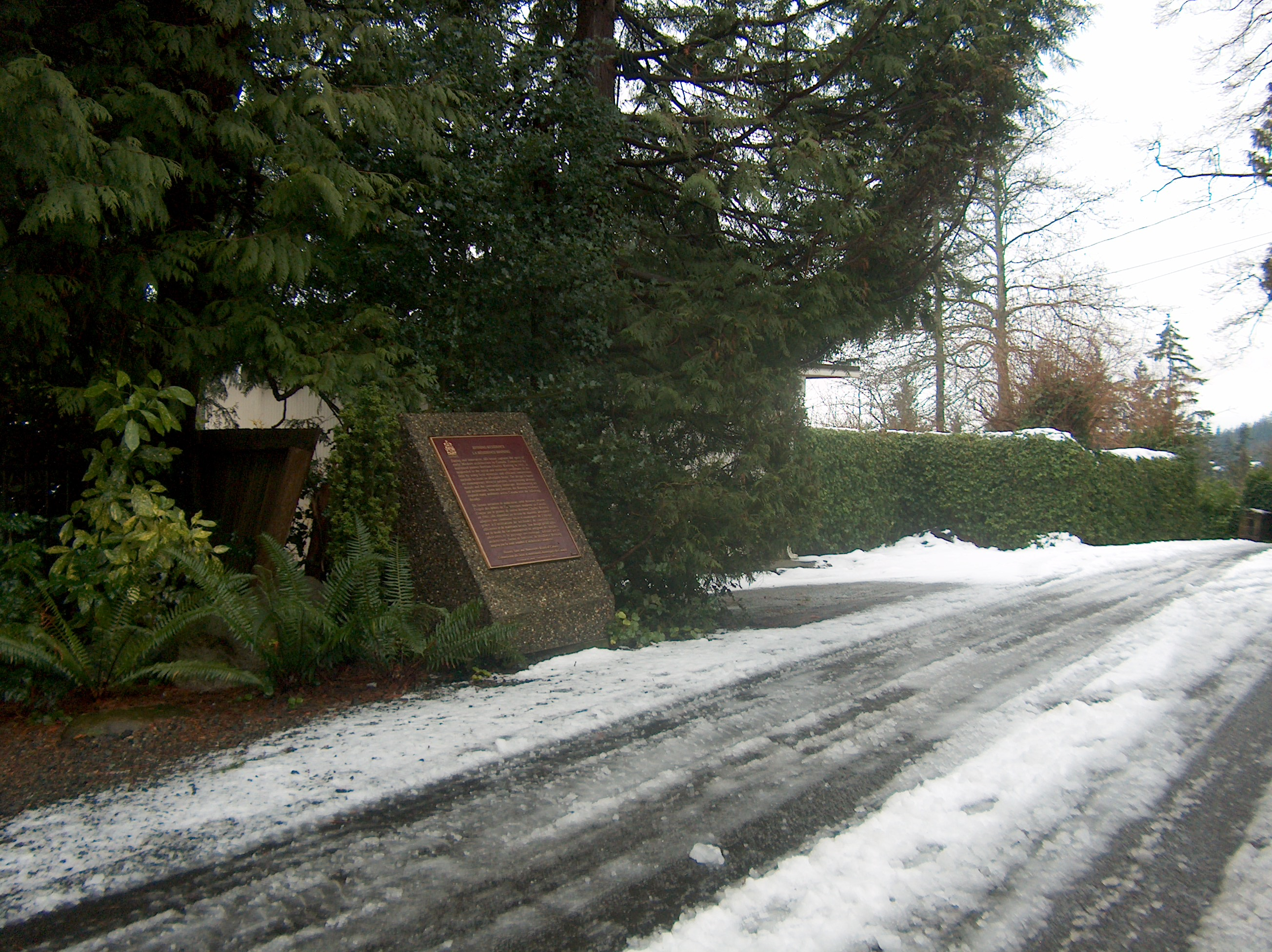
In 2014, the Conservancy was prevented from selling the B.C. Binning House in Victoria in an effort to stave off bankruptcy

The Land Conservancy accomplishes its work through the use of covenants, land purchases, long-term leases and agreements with local and provincial governments. The land assets of the TLC are valued at over $30 million.

TLC-owned properties include:

- Fort Shepherd Conservancy Area
- Clearwater Wetlands and Wildlife Corridor
- Nimpo Lake
- Abkhazi Garden
- Madrona Farm
- Second Lake
- Todd Road
- Alston Stewart
- Lorimer Road

TLC's Conservation Covenants include:

Kootenay Region

- Heavenly Acres Covenant
- Kutenai Growth Society Covenant
- Little Slocan River Covenant
- Newhouse Island Covenant
- Paradise Valley
- Valhalla Mile

Lower Mainland Region

- Anemone-Foxglove
- Barnfield Farm
- Corrigan Property
- Eikelenboom
- Emerald Forest
- Garibaldi Springs
- Gospel Rock
- Pincott Property
- Roberts Creek
- Sandy Beach
- Squamish Gravel Pit
- Squamish Mamquam Blind Channel
- Vida
- West Creek Wetlands
- Woodward (Hillkeep)

North Region

- Dunster (Previant-Daam)

Okanagan Region

- Caravan Farm
- Coldstream Creek
- Eagle Bluff (South Okanagan Rehabilitation Centre for Owls)
- Gardom Lake
- Mabel’s Pond
- Max Lake
- McLean Creek (Young)
- Nemes (Okanagan River Oxbow)
- O’Reilly
- Skaha Conservation Area
- Wildfalls Nature Conservancy
- Woodlandhaven (Morland Bird Haven)

Vancouver Island/Coast Region

- Achilles Covenant
- Andreas Vogt Nature Reserve
- Atkins Road
- Ayum Creek Connector
- Ayum Creek Regional Park
- Bailin Property
- Barer Property
- Bear Mountain Covenants
- Buchanan Covenant
- Camas Hill
- Caromar
- Clayoquot Island Covenant
- Cortes Island Covenants
- Cross Covenants
- Cumberland Forestry Society Covenant
- DeMamiel Creek Covenants
- EcoInitiatives
- Devreux Lake Covenant
- Finlay Lake
- Glen Lake Covenant
- Gordon West
- Gorge Waterway
- Gorge-Selkirk Restoration Project
- Gowlland Point
- Hanks’ Beach
- Havenwood
- Highlands Estates
- Hollyhock
- Howard Horel Nature Reserve
- Hunter Covenant
- Hunter Covenant
- Hurford Hill Nature Park
- Ivan Island Covenant
- Jennings Covenant
- Johnson Covenant
- Keefer Covenant
- Kingco Covenants
- Kinghorn Covenant
- Kwel Nature Sanctuary
- Lampson Covenant
- Langvista Covenant
- Linnaea Farm
- Lohbrunner Farm
- Lyoness Covenants
- Malahat Forest Estates
- Masters Covenant
- Matthews Point
- Maxwell Lake
- McLoughlin Park
- McRae, Van and Homer Covenant
- Meadow Valley
- Millard Covenant
- Morton Property
- Mt. Matheson
- My Whim
- Oak Haven
- Packford Covenant
- Pugh Covenant
- Qualicum Heritage Forest
- Ralston Property
- RLC Park
- Ruby Alton Nature Reserve
- Ruffed Grouse Ridge
- Sandwick Forest
- Sansum Point
- Sea to Sea Green Blue Belt
- Siskin Lane Covenants
- Sooke Hills Covenant
- South Chains Covenant
- St. Mary Lake
- Stebbings Covenant
- Stewart Mountain Road
- Sutil POint Road
- Thetis- Mt Work Connector
- Treedom
- Trincomali Nature Reserve
- Trincomali Nature Sanctuary
- Twin Oaks
- Walter Bay
- Welland Legacy Park
- Wennanac Covenant
- Whaletown Creek/Commons
- White Covenant
- Wildwood Marsh
- Yellow Point Lodge

== See also ==
- Capital Regional District
