= Dmitry, Prince of Abkhazia =

Prince of Abkhazia

Dmitry
- Prince of Abkhazia
- Reign: 1821–1822
- Predecessor: Sefer Ali-Bey
- Successor: Mikhail
- Died: 16 October 1822; Lykhny
Names
- Dmitry Sharvashidze
- House: Sharvashidze
- Father: Prince Giorgi Sharvashidze
- Mother: Princess Tamara Dadiani

Dmitry Giorgievitch Sharvashidze, or Umar Bey (Abkhaz: Князь Омарбеи Сафарбеи-иԥа Шарвашидзе-Чачба), was briefly the Prince of Abkhazia in 1821–1822.

== Biography ==
He was a colonel in the Russian army. He converted to Christianity and was baptised into the Orthodox faith under the name of Dmitry.

He succeeded as the Prince of Abkhazia on the death of his father, February 7 (or November 13) 1821. He was poisoned at Lykhny by Urus Lakoba, October 16, 1822.

== Ancestry ==
Ancestors of Dmitry, Prince of Abkhazia

16. Prince Khamid Shervashidze (Chachba)
8. Prince Mancha Shervashidze (Chachba)
4. Prince Kelesh Ahmed Bey Shervashidze (Chachba)
9. Princess Esma Aredba
2. Prince Giorgi Shervashidze (Chachba)
5. Leyba
1. Prince Dmitry Giorgievitch Shervashidze (Chachba)
24. Prince Bejan I Dadiani
12. Prince Otia I Dadiani
24. Princess Tamara Gelovani
6. Prince Katsia II Dadiani
26. Prince Koshita III Chkeidze
13. Princess Gulkhana Chkeidze
27. Princess Mariam Bagration
3. Princess Tamara Dadiani
14. Prince Paata Tsulukidze
7. Princess Anna Tsulukidze

Dmitry, Prince of Abkhazia House of Shervashidze/Chachba
Regnal titles
Preceded by Sefer Ali-Bey	Prince of Abkhazia; 1821–1822	Succeeded by Mikhail
