= Tsebelda fortress =

Fortress in Abkhazia, Georgia

Tsebelda Fortress
- New Athos, Abkhazia, Georgia

Location
- Location within Abkhazia Location within Georgia
- Coordinates: 43°01′30″N 41°16′00″E

Tsebelda fortress is a Late Antique/Early Medieval fortification near the village of Tsebelda, in the eponymous valley, in Abkhazia, Georgia.

== History ==
The Tsebelda fortress is an architectural complex consisting of ruined towers, Christian chapels, a palace, necropolis, and several other structures. It is erected on two cliffs more than 400 m high above the Kodori river gorge. The extant structures at Tsebelda are identified with the Tsibilium/Tzibile of the Classical authors, such as Procopius of Caesarea. It appears to have been a chief fortress in Apsilia, a vassal principality of the Lazic kingdom in the 6th century. The fortress dominated the confluence of three major routes from the northern Eurasian steppe on their way to the Black Sea. Around 550, during the Lazic War, the Laz notable Terdetes betrayed his king Gubazes and handed the fortress of Tzibile over to the Persians. The Apsilians retook the fort, but refused to accept Lazic rule until persuaded to do so by the Byzantine general John Guzes.

== Current state ==
The law of Georgia treats the monument as part of cultural heritage in the occupied territories. In January 2017, Georgia, followed by the United States Mission to the OSCE, accused the Russian military of having put the historical site of Tsebelda under risk of destruction after a nearby located 19th-century Polish cemetery and a church were demolished in order to build a shooting range. Officials from breakaway Abkhazia confirmed the damage during a firing range construction but did not elaborate further details. The Russian Defense Ministry denied any involvement.

== See also ==
- Tsebelda culture
