= Dardin Sharvashidze =

Georgian nobleman

- Duke of Abkhazia
- Predecessor: Otagho II
- Born: unknown
- Died: 1243; Köse Dağ
- Noble family: House of Sharvashidze

Dardin Sharvashidze (Georgian: დარდინ შარვაშიძე; died June 26, 1243), was a Georgian nobleman of the 13th century. A member of the Sharvashidze house, he governed Tskhumi (Abkhazia) as a hereditary ruler (eristavi) under Queen Rusudan of Georgia, during the period when the Mongols invaded and brought the kingdom under their domination. Opposed to Mongol rule, he formed an alliance with other Georgian nobles and offered his support to the Sultanate of Rum against the Mongols, but was killed in the decisive Battle of Köse Dağ in 1243.

== Biography ==
Little information is available about Dardin Sharvashidze, as the rule of the medieval princes of Abkhazia is sparsely recorded in contemporary Georgian sources. A member of the house of Sharvashidze in western Georgia, he became eristavi (duke or governor) of the Georgian province of Abkhazia (Duchy of Tskhumi), (Note: The title of eristavi is an honour traditionally bestowed by the Georgian monarch upon certain members of the high nobility. Accompanied by extensive appanages, this title nevertheless became de facto hereditary as the power of the sovereigns diminished.) probably during the final years of the Golden Age of the Kingdom of Georgia. He witnessed the Mongol invasion of Georgia in the late 1230s.

Dardin was among the last Georgian nobles to resist submission to Mongol authority, allowing Abkhazia to remain independent from the control of Ögedei Khan (r. 1227–1241). In 1243, while Queen Rusudan accepted Mongol suzerainty over South Caucasus, Dardin joined the army of Kaykhusraw II, the Seljuk Sultan of Rum, who sought to organize a final resistance against the Mongol expansion in the Turkic world. That same year, he fought alongside other rebellious Georgian nobles, including Pharadavla of Akhaltsikhe.

On 26 June 1243, Dardin served as one of the commanders on the Seljuk side at the Battle of Köse Dağ, where he faced around 3,000 Georgian auxiliaries among the enemy’s 15,000 to 20,000 troops. Dardin was killed in battle, and the Mongols secured a decisive victory despite the numerical superiority of the Seljuk forces.

== Sources ==
- Claude Cahen, « Köse Dagh » in Encyclopaedia of Islam, P. Bearman et al. (Brill 2007).
- Asatiani, Nodar; Janelidze, Otar (2009). History of Georgia: From Ancient Times to the Present Day. Publishing House Petite. ISBN 9789941906367.
