= Rostom Sharvashidze =

Rostom Shervashidze

Prince of Abkhazia
- Reign: c.1700–1730
- Predecessor: Zegnak Sharvashidze
- Successor: Hamid Bey
- House: Sharvashidze
- Father: Zegnak Sharvashidze

Rostom Sharvashidze (Georgian: როსტომ შარვაშიძე) was a ruler of the Principality of Abkhazia of the 18th century, who ruled c. 1700–1730. A member of House Sharvashidze, he governed only a third of the principality, the rest of Abkhazia being divided among his two brothers. During his reign, he had to face an increasing Ottoman influence, while engaging in a losing struggle against Samegrelo and a war against Imereti.

== Biography ==
Rostom Sharvashidze was the oldest son of Zegnak Sharvashidze. Born in the second half of the 17th century, little information is known on the life of Rostom, contemporary Abkhaz sources being scarce. He was born into the ancient House Sharvashidze, a Georgian princely family that ruled over Abkhazia on behalf of the Kings of Georgia since the Middle-Ages. Around 1700, he acceded the Abkhaz throne after his father's death, but was forced to divide his territories with his two younger brothers, Jikeshia and Kvapu. Jikeshia was granted the lands of northern Abkhazia, between the rivers Kodori and Ghalidzga, while Kvapu took over the southern region of the principality till the Enguri river.

Rostom only controlled the territories of the Bzyb Valley, including Sokhumi, but was recognized suzerain of the entire principality, as the elder brother. He may have maintained good ties with both of his brothers, as evidenced in his decision to gift Kvapu dominion over the Georgian noble families of Anchabadze, Emukhvari, Inalishvili, Margania, Zvanibaia, Lakerbaia and Akirtava. Moreover, Rostom was recognized as lord of a multitude of clans that ruled over the decentralized regions of Abkhazia, including the Marshanias of Tzabaldal and the Gechbas of Jiketi.

He spent his reign seeking to balance the influences of the Ottoman Empire and the Principality of Samegrelo, both considering themselves the suzerains of Abkhazia. In 1701, Sokhumi was formally annexed by the Ottomans, who built a fortress there, while Rostom moved to Lykhny. In the winter of 1702, probably at the instigation of Istanbul, he launched an assault of Samegrelo with his brother Kvapu. The Abkhazians ravaged the region, killing and capturing several Georgians and occupying the border marches.

In response, King George V of Imereti agreed to help Prince George IV of Samegrelo and invaded Abkhazia, defeating Rostom's weak troops. The latter agreed to recognize the Georgian domination over Abkhazia, while returning the Mingrelian hostages captured during their raids and the territories they conquered, while paying a large tribute. Before leaving Abkhazia, King George V made sure to formalize a peace agreement between Rostom and George of Samegrelo.

In 1723, Sultan Ahmed III sent a Turkish robe to Rostom, a symbol of his recognition of Abkhazia as a vassal state of the Ottoman Empire. The Sublime Porte also dispatched a large amount of salt to the subjects of Rostom, solidifying the Empire's influence over Abkhazia. However, this did not prevent two anti-Ottoman revolts in 1725 and 1728 that led to the destruction of the Turkish fortress of Sokhumi.

Following his death c. 1730, he was replaced as Prince of Abkhazia by his nephew Hamid Bey Sharvashidze, a son of Jikeshia.

== Bibliography ==
- Brosset, Marie-Félicité (1856). Histoire de la Géorgie de l'Antiquité jusqu'au XIXe siècle. Histoire moderne [History of Georgia from Ancient Times to the 19th Century. Modern History] (in French) (Adamant Media Corporation ed.). Saint-Petersburg. ISBN 0543944808.
- Tsurtsumia, Zaza (2009). Abkhazia in Russia-Ottoman Relations (PDF). Tbilisi: State University of Sokhumi.
