= Vachnadze =

Georgian noble family

Coat of Arms of the Vachnadze family

The House of Vachnadze (Georgian: ვაჩნაძე) was a Georgian noble family, a principal line descending from the early medieval Donauri dynasty of Kakheti. Their offshoots were the Beburishvili (probably also Babadishvili). The family has produced several notable religious, military and cultural figures.

== History ==
The Vachnadze fief was centered at the village Kardenakhi. Their princely rank was recognized by the Russian Empire in 1826 and 1850. An unrelated family, originally known as Onanashvili, was enfeoffed with the estate of one of the extinct lines of Vachnadze and allowed to adopt their title and surname in the 18th century.

== In popular culture ==
Bertolt Brecht gave the Vachnadze surname to the protagonist in his Der kaukasische Kreidekreis (The Caucasian Chalk Circle) as a form of deliberate irony in that the protagonist, Grusha Vachnadze, was a poor maid in the service of a princely household.
