= Apsilae =

Ancient region and principality in the South Caucasus

Principality of Apselia
- c. 1st century CE–730 CE
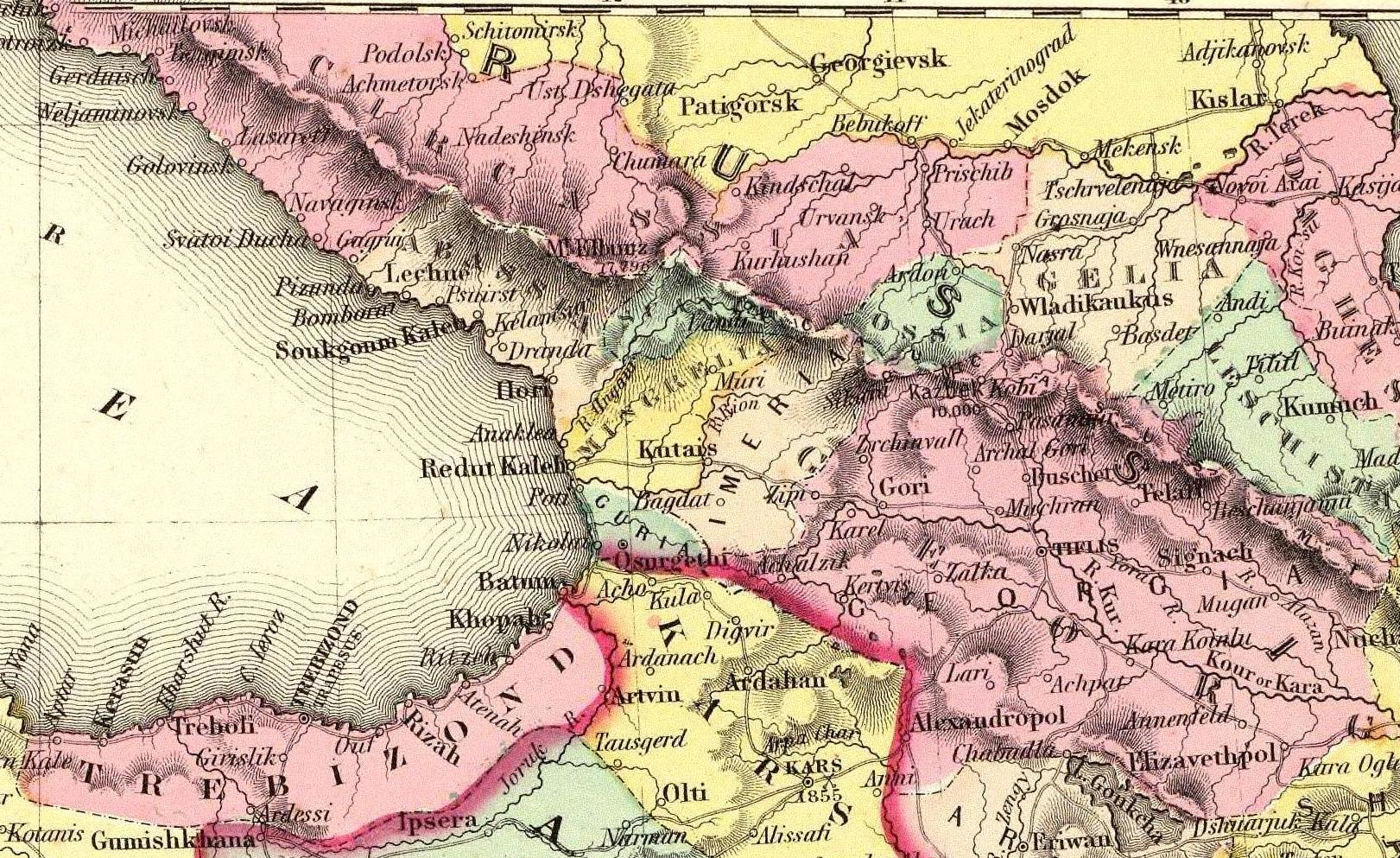
- The region of Apselia in the 1st century CE
- Religion: Pagan, later Eastern Orthodox Christianity
- Historical era: Ancient, Classical, Medieval
  - Established: c. 1st century CE
  - Disestablished: 730 CE
Preceded by	Succeeded by
Colchis	Abasgia

The Principality of Apselia was an ancient polity located on the Black Sea coast of the northwest Caucasus near the estuary of Kodori river. The earliest known historical references to Apselia are from the writings of Pliny the Elder (1st century CE) and Flavius Arrian (2nd century CE), who referred to the region as Apsilae (Greek: Αψιλαι).

== History ==
The first known record of the Apsilae occurs in the writings of Pliny of the 1st century AD, as well as of Flavius Arrianus in the 2nd century (Greek: Αψιλαι).

The legal and cultural foundations of Apselia were established during the reign of King Julian (Julianus). During the Roman Empire period, under Emperor Trajan (98-117 CE), Apselia became its official administrative region. However, by around 730 CE, Apselia came under the control of the stronger Abasgoi Principality, and by the second half of the 8th century, the region of Apsilae disappears from historical records. Apselia eventually became part of the Kingdom of Abkhazia after the inclusion of additional territories.

== Important settlements ==
The settlements of Sebastopolis and Tibeleos (associated with Tsebelda by George Hewitt) were located in Apselia.

== Identity ==
The region has been a subject of political and ethnic debate, with scholars questioning whether the Apsilians are the ancestors of the modern-day Abkhazians or the Georgians.

The Apsilae may have been the ancestors of the Abkhaz people (in Abkhaz Аҧсуаа, Apswa). They may have descended from the ancient Zygii people who settled in the Black Sea region.

Their culture is known as the Tsebelda culture, marked by well-developed local manufacturing of metal products and tools.
