= Aslan-Bey Sharvashidze =

Prince of Abkhazia

Aslan-Bey Sharvashidze, from the House of Sharvashidze, was the Prince of the Principality of Abkhazia from 1808 to 1810.

== Biography ==
He was the eldest son of Prince Kelesh Ahmed-Bey Sharvashidze by his first wife, Princess Mariam Dzapsh-Ipa.

Aslan-Bey was associated with pro-western and pro-Turkish elements of the region and was purportedly responsible for rebelling against and later killing his father in order to ascend the throne of the Principality. According to George Hewitt, this was a Russian fabrication and the assassination was organised by Aslan-Bey's brother, Sefer-bey, Nino Dadiani and the Russian military administration.

Aslan-Bey turned the town of Sukhumi into his royal residence, which at the time was guarded by a Turkish military regiment. Aslan-Bey actively fought together with King Solomon II of Imereti against Tsarist Russian forces.

In 1810, after several decisive Russian military victories, the House of Sharvashidze was driven out of Sukhumi together with the Turkish regiment that was protecting him and fled to Turkey. After Aslan-Bey’s expulsion from Abkhazia, the Tsarist Russian leadership established Aslan-Bey’s brother, Sefer Ali-Bey, as the new ruler of Abkhazia.

In an interview with Nikoloz (Nicolas) Sharvashidze, Head-descendant of Aslan-Bey, it was mentioned that the elder descendants of the Aslan-Bey branch of the Sharvashidze family currently reside in Georgia, while the junior branch is said to have gone extinct in Turkey. Nikoloz is currently a student at the University of Texas at Austin in the McCombs School of Business and as such resides in Austin, Texas.

Aslan-Bey Sharvashidze House of Sharvashidze
Regnal titles
Preceded by Kelesh Ahmed-Bey	Prince of Abkhazia; 1808–1810	Succeeded by Sefer Ali-Bey
