= Yuri Voronov (archaeologist) =

Abkhazian politician (1941–1995)

Yuri Nikolaevich Voronov Юрий Николаевич Воронов
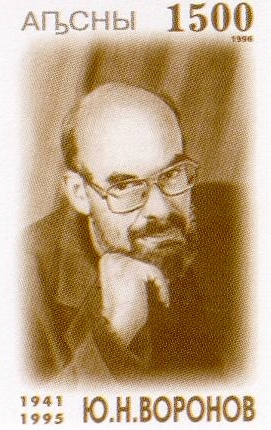

Vice Premier of Abkhazia
- In office 1993 – 11 September 1995

Personal details
- Born: May 8, 1941 Tsebelda, Abkhazia
- Died: September 11, 1995 (aged 54) Sukhumi, Abkhazia

Yuri Nikolaevich Voronov (Russian: Юрий Николаевич Воронов, 8 May 1941 – 11 September 1995) was a politician and academic from Abkhazia who was murdered in front of his apartment on the night of 11 September 1995. At the time of his death, he was Vice Premier and a member of the Abkhazian Supreme Soviet.

== Early life and career ==
Yuri Voronov was born on 8 May 1941 in Tsebelda, in the Gulripshi District of the Abkhazian ASSR.
