= Kelesh Ahmed-Bey Sharvashidze =

Prince of Abkhazia

- Kelesh-Bey Sharvashidze
- Reign: 1780s–1808
- Predecessor: Zurab
- Successor: Aslan-Bey
- Died: Sukhumi
- Spouse: Mariam Dzapsh-Ipa; Leiba-khanum of Mgudzrikhva; Rabia-Begum Marshania of Tselebi; Afize-khanum Inal-Ipa
- Issue: See #Children
- House: Sharvashidze
- Father: Manuchar Sharvashidze
- Religion: Islam

Kelesh Ahmed-Bey (Kelesh-Bey) Sharvashidze (1747–1808) was the head of state of the Principality of Abkhazia from the 1780s to 1808.

== Biography ==
Kelesh-Bey was born in 1747 in the Principality of Abkhazia, the son of Manuchar Sharvashidze, Prince of Abkhazia. In his childhood, Kelesh-Bey was taken to Constantinople, Ottoman Empire as a hostage, where he was converted to Islam. Kelesh returned to Abkhazia from Istanbul in the 1770s with the goal of taking over and ruling his native land. With the help of Turkish forces, Kelesh-Bey was able to overthrow his uncle, Zurab Sharvashidze, and take over the Abkhaz crown. Kelesh-Bey was known for his energetic drive to consolidate state power while actively fighting against the Principality of Mingrelia which bordered Abkhazia to the east. Kelesh-Bey was the grand father of Gülüstü Hanım, Sultan Abdulmejid I's consort and Sultan Mehmed VI's mother.

In 1802, he rallied the Turkish support and captured the Mingrelian fort of Anaklia. After Mingrelia joined the Russian Empire in 1803, Kelesh also tried to seek closer ties (associated relations) with Russia, which led to Abkhazia’s break with Ottoman Turkey. Becoming increasingly worried about Abkhazia drifting closer to Russia, the Turkish leadership tried to remove Kelesh-Bey from power by force, but failed. In the end, Turkey was able to remove Kelesh from the Abkhaz throne by forging close ties to his son Aslan-Bey who killed his father and became the new ruler of Abkhazia. George Hewitt considers this a Russian fabrication and accuses Aslan-bey's brother Sefer-Bey, Nino Dadiani and the Russian military administration of the assassination.

== Personal life ==
Kelesh Ahmed-Bay Sharvashidze married 4 times. He married in 1771 his first wife was Princess Mariam Dzapsh-Ipa. They divorced in 1789. He was married secondly to Leiba-khanum of Mgudzrikhva, thirdly to Rabia-Begum Marshania of Tselebi (b. 1748) and for the fourth time to Princess Afize-khanum Inal-Ipa, widow of his cousin, Bekir Bey Sharvashidze, Lord of Shuasopeli. He had:

- Aslan-Bey Sharvashidze
- Sefer Ali-Bey Sharvashidze
- Batal Bey Sharvashidze
- Hasan Bey Sharvashidze
- Tatar Bey Sharvashidze
- Rustam Bey Sharvashidze
- Sulaiman Bey Sharvashidze
- Mahmud Bey Sharvashidze
- Sekir Bey Sharvashidze
- Rustam Khanum Sharvashidze (by his thirs wife)

Kelesh Ahmed-Bey Sharvashidze House of Sharvashidze
Regnal titles
| Preceded by Zurab | Prince of Abkhazia circa 1780–1808 | Succeeded by Aslan-Bey |
