= Sefer Ali-Bey Sharvashidze =

Prince of Abkhazia

Sefer Ali-Bey Sharvashidze (also known by the Christian name of Giorgi Sharvashidze) was a prince of the Principality of Abkhazia in 1810–21.

== Biography ==
He was the youngest son of Kelesh Ahmed-Bey Sharvashidze by his first wife, Princess Mariam Dzapsh-Ipa.

After Kelesh Ahmed-beg was killed by his heir, Aslan-Bey Sharvashidze (or, according to George Hewitt by Sefer-bey himself, together with Nino Dadiani and the Russian military administration), Sefer Ali-Bey was forced to hide out in neighboring Mingrelia under the protection of the Mingrelian princess regent Nino. With the help of the Mingrelian nobility, Sefer Ali-Bey tried unsuccessfully, to usurp the throne of Abkhazia by using his father Ahmet-beg as a legitimate heir to the throne. In 1809, Sharvashidze asked the Tsarist Russian Empire to take Abkhazia under its protection, with the condition that Ali-Bey be established as the new ruler of the Principality. After decisive Russian victories during the Second Russo-Turkish War, the Russian forces were able to expel pro-Turkish Abkhazians as well as the remaining Turkish forces from the region. Tsar Alexander I established Sefer Ali-Bey Sharvashidze as the new ruler of Abkhazia on 17 February 1810. He died in 1821 and was buried at the Lykhny Church.

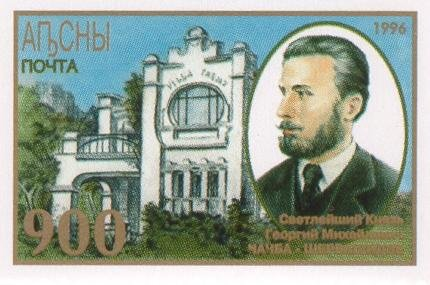
Sharvashidze on a 1996 stamp of Abkhazia

Sefer Ali-Bey Sharvashidze House of Sharvashidze/Chachba
Regnal titles
Preceded by Aslan-Bey	Prince of Abkhazia; 1810–1821	Succeeded by Dmitry
