= House of Sharvashidze =

Georgian-Abkhazian ruling family

Sharvashidze შარვაშიძე
- Nobility / Royalty
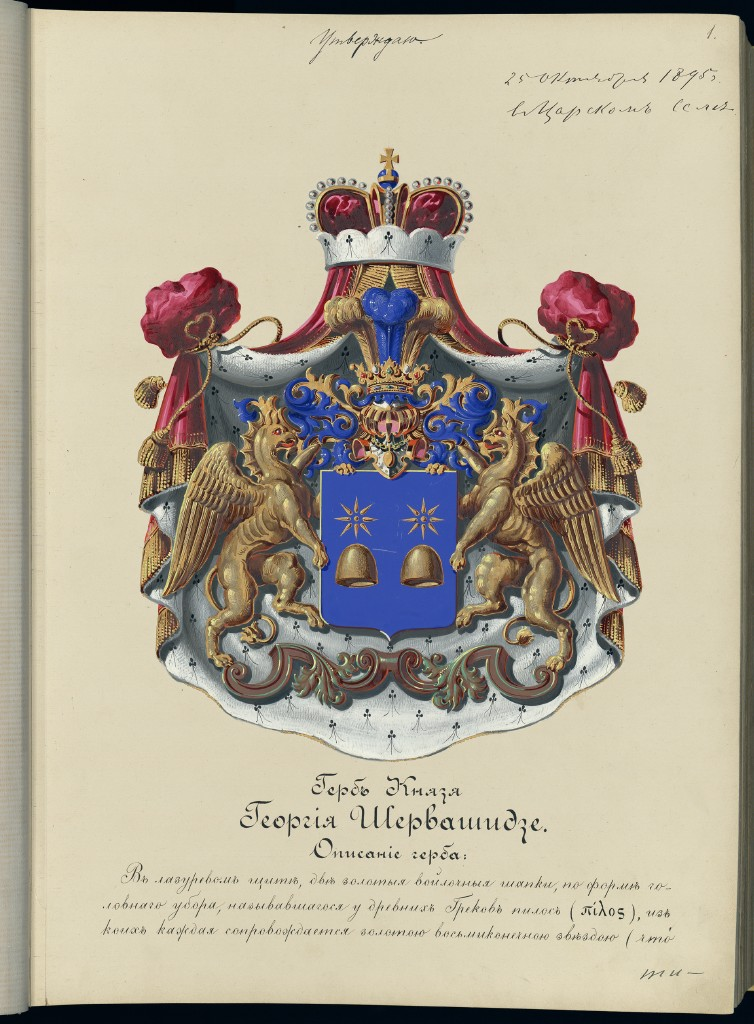
- Parent house: Shirvanshah / Kingdom of Abkhazia
- Country: Georgia; Abkhazia
- Titles: Principality of Abkhazia; Duchy of Tskhumi; Sukhum Okrug
- Cadet branches: Eristavi of Guria, Abkhazi

The House of Sharvashidze or Shervashidze (Georgian: შარვაშიძე-შერვაშიძე) was a Georgian-Abkhazian ruling family of the Principality of Abkhazia. The family was later recognized as one of the princely families of the Russian Empire at the request of King Heraclius II of Georgia in accordance with the list of Georgian noblemen presented in the Treaty of Georgievsk.

== History ==
Although the surname is given in a standard Georgian form (particularly, the typical –dze suffix meaning "a son"), in the 12th century the family is said to have derived its original name from Shirvanshahs, a dynasty of Shirvan. According to the medieval The Georgian Chronicles, the Shirvanese princes were granted the possessions in the province of Abkhazia after David IV, one of Georgia's greatest kings, extended his kingdom to Shirvan in 1124.

Anchabadze disputes this genealogy and argues that Sharvashidze was a local dynasty (they had another purely Abkhazian name Chachba or Çaçba) that had invented a foreign ancestry which is not unusual in feudal genealogies.

The first representative of the dynasty assumed the princely powers under the authority of the Georgian kings circa 1325. It was not, however, until the final decomposition of the unified Georgian feudal state in the late 15th century, when the Abkhazian princes obtained their full independence, only to soon become vassals of the Ottoman Empire.

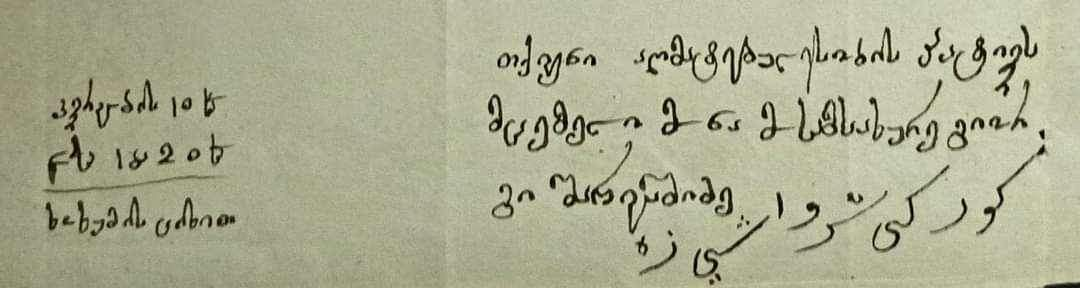
Signature of Giorgi Sharvashidze in Georgian language, Prince of Principality of Abkhazia

In the late 18th century, the Sharvashidze princes embraced Islam, but shifted back and forth across the religious divide, as the Russians and Ottomans struggled for controlling the area. The pro-Russian orientation prevailed, and Abkhazia joined Imperial Russia in 1810 while the Sharvashidzes (Russian: Шарвашидзе) were confirmed in the Russian princely rank in accordance with the Russo-Georgian Treaty of Georgievsk.

According to Nikoloz Sharvashidze (Head of the House of Sharvashidze) the elder descendants of the Aslan-Bey branch of the family live in Georgia, while the junior branch is said to have gone extinct in Turkey. Nikoloz is currently a student at the University of Texas at Austin in the McCombs School of Business and as such resides in Austin, Texas.

== Princes of Abkhazia ==
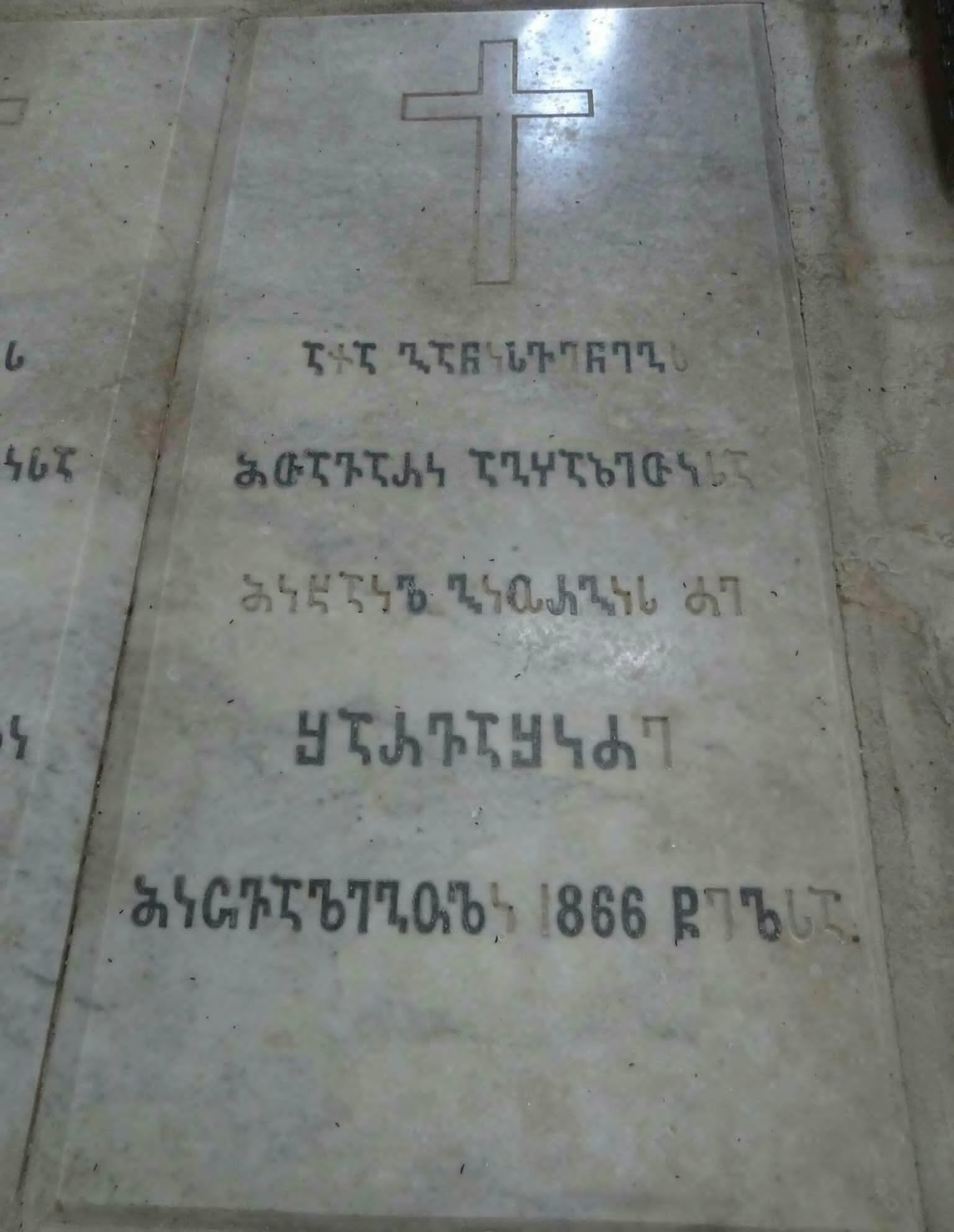
Gravestone of the last ruler of principality of Abkhazia Mikheil Sharvashidze (Khamut-Bay) in Georgian language, in Georgian alphabet made by son of Mikheil Sharvashidze - Giorgi Sharvashidze

1. Otagho I Sharvashidze
2. Otagho II Sharvashidze (circa 1213)
3. Dardin Sharvashidze (circa 1213–1243)
4. Arghunai Sharvashidze
5. Rabia Sharvashidze
6. Solomon Sharvashidze
7. Arazkhan Sharvashidze
8. Beslak Sharvashidze
9. Karabey Sharvashidze
10. Putu Sharvashidze (circa 1580–1620)
11. Seteman Sharvashidze (circa 1620–1640)
12. Sustar Sharvashidze (circa 1640–1665)
13. Zegnak Sharvashidze (circa 1665–1700)
14. Rostom Sharvashidze (circa 1700–1730)
15. Manuchar Sharvashidze (circa 1730–1750)
16. Zurab Sharvashidze (circa 1750–1780)
17. Kelesh Ahmed-Bey Sharvashidze (circa 1780–1808)
18. Aslan-Bey Sharvashidze(1808–1810)
19. Sefer Ali-Bey (George) (1810–1821)
20. Umar-Bey (Demetreus) (1821–1822)
21. Mikhail Sharvashidze (1822–1864)

Abkhazia incorporated into the Russian Empire (1864)

22. Giorgi Sharvashidze (George) (1866–1918)

23. Aleksandr Sharvashidze (Alexander) (1918–1968)

Direct descendants through the elder line of Aslan Bey Sharvashidze

24. George Konstantinovich Sharvashidze (1973–2010)

25. Teimuraz Georgievitch Sharvashidze (2010-)

26. Nikoloz Teimurazevich Sharvashidze

== Kartlian Branch ==
In the former Kingdom of Kartli, a branch of the Sharvashidze family was founded by Prince Elizbar Sharvashidze, the Molaretukhutsesi (Lord-High Treasurer), of King Heraclius II of Kartli-Kakheti. His sons were Nikoloz, also the Molaretukhutsesi (Lord-High Treasurer) of King George XII of Kartli-Kakheti, Malakia, and Ivan, however, their descendants went extinct in further generations. Their familial domain was located in Kareli in inner-Kartli.

== Notable members of the family ==
- Dardin Sharvashidze - Anti-Mongol Warrior.
- Otagho Sharvashidze - Georgian noble
- Kelesh Ahmed-Bey Shervashidze - One of the greatest rulers of Abkhazia who heralded its peak expansion and diplomatic communication with Napoleon's Ambassador Horace François Bastien Sébastiani de La Porta in Costantinople.
- Aslan-Bey Sharvashidze - prince of the Principality of Abkhazia from 1808 to 1810
- Gülistu Kadın - biological mother of Ottoman Sultan Mehmed VI Vahidettin

== See also ==
- Principality of Abkhazia
- List of Georgian princes (mtavars)
- Eristavi of Guria
- Abkhazi

== Sources ==
- (in English) Georgi M. Derluguian, The Tale of Two Resorts: Abkhazia and Ajaria Before and Since and the Soviet Collapse. In: The Myth of "Ethnic Conflict": Politics, Economics, and "Cultural" Violence, edited by Beverly Crawford and Ronnie D. Lipschutz. University of California Press/University of California International and Area Studies Digital Collection, Edited Volume #98, pp. 261–292, 1998
- (in English) "მემორია" ასლან ბეგ შარვაშიძის 17 წლის შთამომავალი". YouTube. Interview with the Head Descendant of Aslan-Bey Sharvashidze, Nikoloz Sharvashidze, a student at the University of Texas at Austin in the McCombs School of Business.
- (in Russian) The Oath of Allegiance of Prince Sefer-Ali Bek to the Russian crown, August 23 1810 (text)
- (in Russian)Russian Biographical Dictionary
- (in Russian) Stanislav Vladimirovich Dumin. Pyotr Grebelsky. The Noble Houses of the Russian Empire. Moscow, Russia: 1994. Думин С. В., Гребельский П. Х. Дворянские роды Российской Империи. - Москва, 1994
- https://erekle.archive.gov.ge/documents/401 - Document confirming the Kartlian branch of the family with the dignity of Prince by Heraclius II of Kartli-Kakheti
