= Principality of Abkhazia =

1463–1864 dependent state in the South Caucasus

Principality of Abkhazia Аԥсуа Аҳра (Abkhaz) აფხაზეთის სამთავრო (Georgian)
- 1463–1864
- 18th-century coat of arms according to Prince Vakhushti of Kartli.

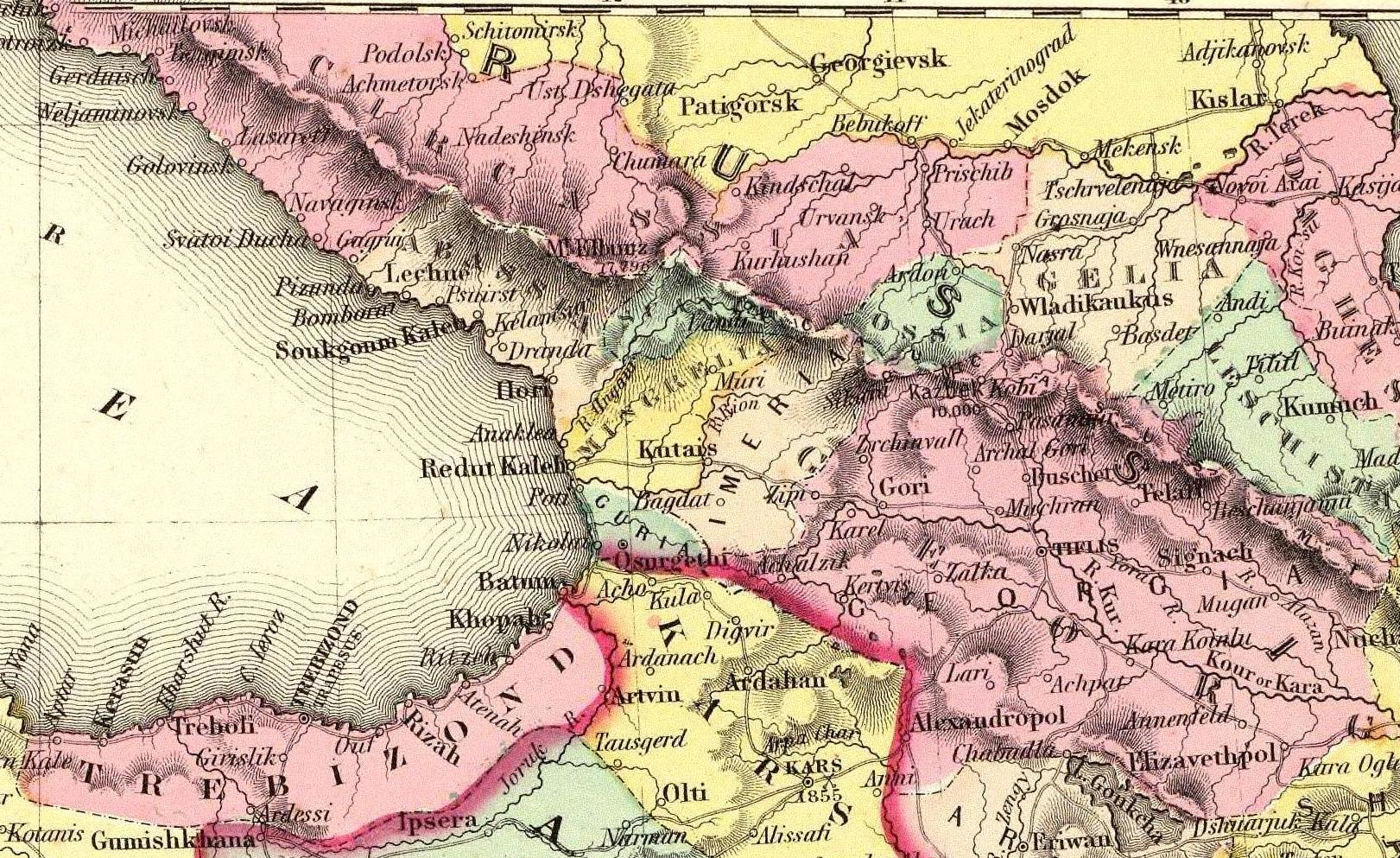
- The Principality of Abkhazia (Abassia) in the 1850s
- Capital: Zupu (Lykhny); 43°09′N 40°37′E
- Official languages: Georgian (language of governance, literacy and culture)
- Other languages: Abkhaz, Mingrelian
- Religion: Eastern Orthodox Christianity (majority and dynastic 1463–1780; 1810–1864); Sunni Islam (significant minority and dynastic 1780–1810)
- Demonyms: Abkhazian, Abkhaz
- Government: Principality
- Prince;
  - c.1451-1465 (first): Rabia Sharvashidze
  - 1823–1864 (last): Mikhail Sharvashidze
- Historical era: Early Modern Period
  - Established: 1463
  - Caucasian War: 1817–64
  - Disestablished: 1864
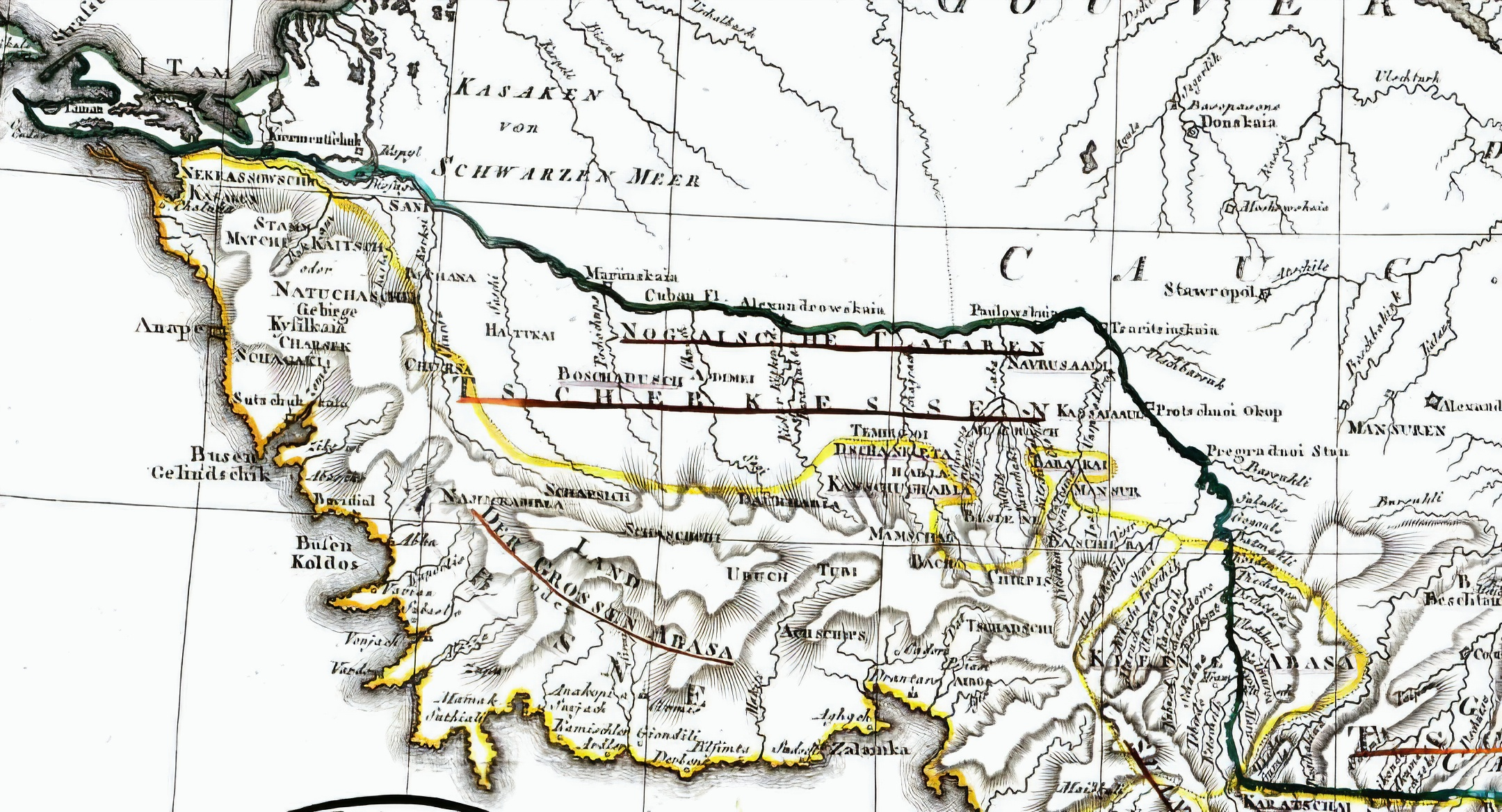
- Map of the territory of Great and Small Abasia (Abkhazia) in 1808
Preceded by	Succeeded by
Kingdom of Georgia; Kingdom of Imereti	Russian Empire; Ottoman Empire

The Principality of Abkhazia (Note: Abkhaz: Аԥсуа Аҳра, romanized: Apsua Ahra, IPA: [apʰsəwa aħra]; Georgian: აფხაზეთის სამთავრო, romanized: apkhazetis samtavro) emerged as a separate feudal entity in the 15th–16th centuries, amid the civil wars in the Kingdom of Georgia that concluded with the dissolution of the unified Georgian monarchy. The principality retained a degree of autonomy under Ottoman and then Russian rule, but was eventually absorbed into the Russian Empire in 1864, following the Caucasian War.

== Background ==
As a duchy (saeristavo) within the Kingdom of Georgia, Abkhazia was previously referred as the Duchy of Tskhumi. It was ruled by the house of Sharvashidze since the 12th century. The sources are very scarce about the Abkhazian history of that time. The Genoese established their trading factories along the Abkhazian coastline in the 14th century, but they functioned for a short time. When the Georgian kingdom was embroiled in a bitter civil war in the 1450s, the Sharvashidzes joined a major rebellion against King George VIII of Georgia, which saw him defeated at the hands of the rebels at Chikhori in 1463. The victorious king of Imereti created a principality (samtavro) for each of his allies, thus the Principality of Abkhazia was founded. The Abkhazian princes were the vassals of the Principality of Mingrelia under the dynasty of Dadiani(-Bediani), which, in turn, was subordinated to the Kingdom of Imereti. The vassalage was, however, largely nominal, and both Mingrelian and Abkhazian rulers not only successfully fought for their independence, but contested borders with each other and with Imereti. The dependence of Abkhazia was largely symbolic as the region was generally left alone as the kings of Imereti had their hands full governing their designated area. In 1490, the split became official as Georgia was split by treaty into the Kingdom of Kartli, Imereti, of which Abkhazia was a part, Kakheti and Principality of Samtskhe.

== The 16th-18th centuries ==
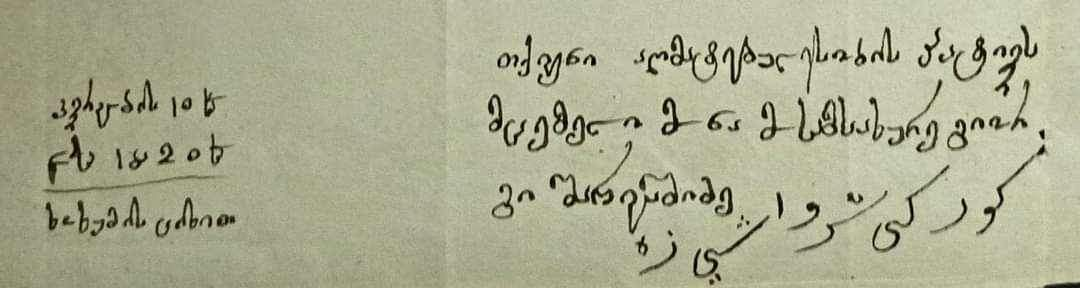
Mkhedruli signature of Giorgi Sharvashidze, Prince of Abkhazia

In the 1570s, the Ottoman navy occupied the fort of Tskhumi, turning it into the Turkish fortress of Suhum-Kale. Abkhazia came under the influence of Turkey and Islam, although Christianity was but slowly replaced and it was not until the second half of the 18th century that the ruling Sharvashidze family embraced Islam. Until then, Abkhazia, secured from large-scale invasions by its mountainous location and impassable forests, had retained independence and profited from commerce in traditional Caucasian commodities, that of slaves not excepted.

Throughout the 16th–18th centuries, the Abkhazian lords were involved in the incessant border conflicts with the Mingrelian princes. As a result, the Sharvashidze potentates were able to expand their possessions in the east, first to the river Ghalidzga, and then to the Enguri, which serves as today's boundary between Abkhazia and Georgia proper. After the death of the Abkhazian prince Zegnak circa 1700, his principality was divided among his sons. The oldest brother Rostom established himself as a prince of Abkhazia proper, also known as the Bzyb Abkhazia, on the coast from the modern-day Gagra on the Bzyb River to the Ghalidzga river, with the residence in the village of Lykhny; Jikeshia received Abjua between the Ghalidzga and the Kodori; and Kvapu became a lord of a county on the coast extending from the Ghalidzga to the Inguri, subsequently known as the country of Samurzakan’o after Kvapu's son Murzakan. The highlands of Dal-Tzabal (Tzebelda, Tsabal) were without any centralized government, but were dominated by the clan of Marshan. Sadzny, formerly known as Zygia (Jiketi of the Georgian sources) extended north to Abkhazia proper between the modern-day cities of Gagra and Sochi, and was run by Gechba, Arydba and Tsanba clans. These polities included also several minor fiefdoms governed by the representatives of the Sharvashidze-Chachba house or other noble families such as Achba (Anchabadze), Emhaa (Emukhvari), Ziapsh-Ipa, Inal-Ipa, Chabalurkhua and Chkhotua. All these princedoms were more or less dependent on the princes of Abkhazia proper.

== Between the Ottoman and Russian empires ==
Kelesh Bey remained neutral between the interests of the Russian Empire and the Ottoman Empire. The first attempt to enter into relation with Russia was made by the said Keilash Bey in 1803, shortly after the incorporation of eastern Georgia into the expanding Tsarist empire (1801). When the Ottomans tried to subjugate Abkhazia and sent a naval squadron to its coast in 1806 Kelesh Bey gathered twenty-five thousand soldiers. Seeing that the fortress of Sukhum-Kale was well-defended the Turkish forces ships sailed back. After the assassination of this prince by his son Aslan-Bey on May 2, 1808, the pro-Ottoman orientation prevailed but for a short time. On July 2, 1810, the Russian Marines stormed Suhum-Kale and had Aslan-Bey replaced with his rival brother, Sefer-Bey (1810–1821), who had converted to Christianity and assumed the name of George. Abkhazia joined the Russian empire as an autonomous principality.

However, George's rule, as well of his successors, was limited to the neighbourhood of Suhum-Kale and the Bzyb area garrisoned by the Russians while the other parts had remained under the rule of the Muslim nobles. The next Russo-Turkish war strongly enhanced the Russian positions, leading to a further split in the Abkhaz elite, mainly along religious divisions. During the Crimean War (1853–1856), Russian forces had to evacuate Abkhazia and Prince Michael (1822–1864) seemingly switched to the Ottomans. Later on, the Russian presence strengthened and the highlanders of Western Caucasia were finally subjugated by Russia in 1864. The autonomy of Abkhazia, which had functioned as a pro-Russian "buffer zone" in this troublesome region, was no more needed to the Tsarist government and the rule of the Sharvashidze came to an end; in November 1864, Prince Michael was forced to renounce his rights and resettle in Voronezh. Abkhazia was incorporated in the Russian Empire as a special military province of Suhum-Kale which was transformed, in 1883, into an okrug as part of the Kutais Guberniya.

== Languages ==
Principal language of governance in the principality of Abkhazia was Georgian language.

Evliya Çelebi in his work mentions that the Sharvashidze dynasty spoke Mingrelian language too(along with Abkhaz) "The principal tribe in Abaza are the Chach, who speak Mingrelian too, which is spoken on the opposite shore of the Fasha/Phasis(Rioni)"

Northern Abkhazians who lived in the dol of Sochi and the Sadzen region spoke both their native language, as well as Abaza, Circassian and Ubykh language

== Lykhny revolt ==
Flag of Lykhnensky revolt

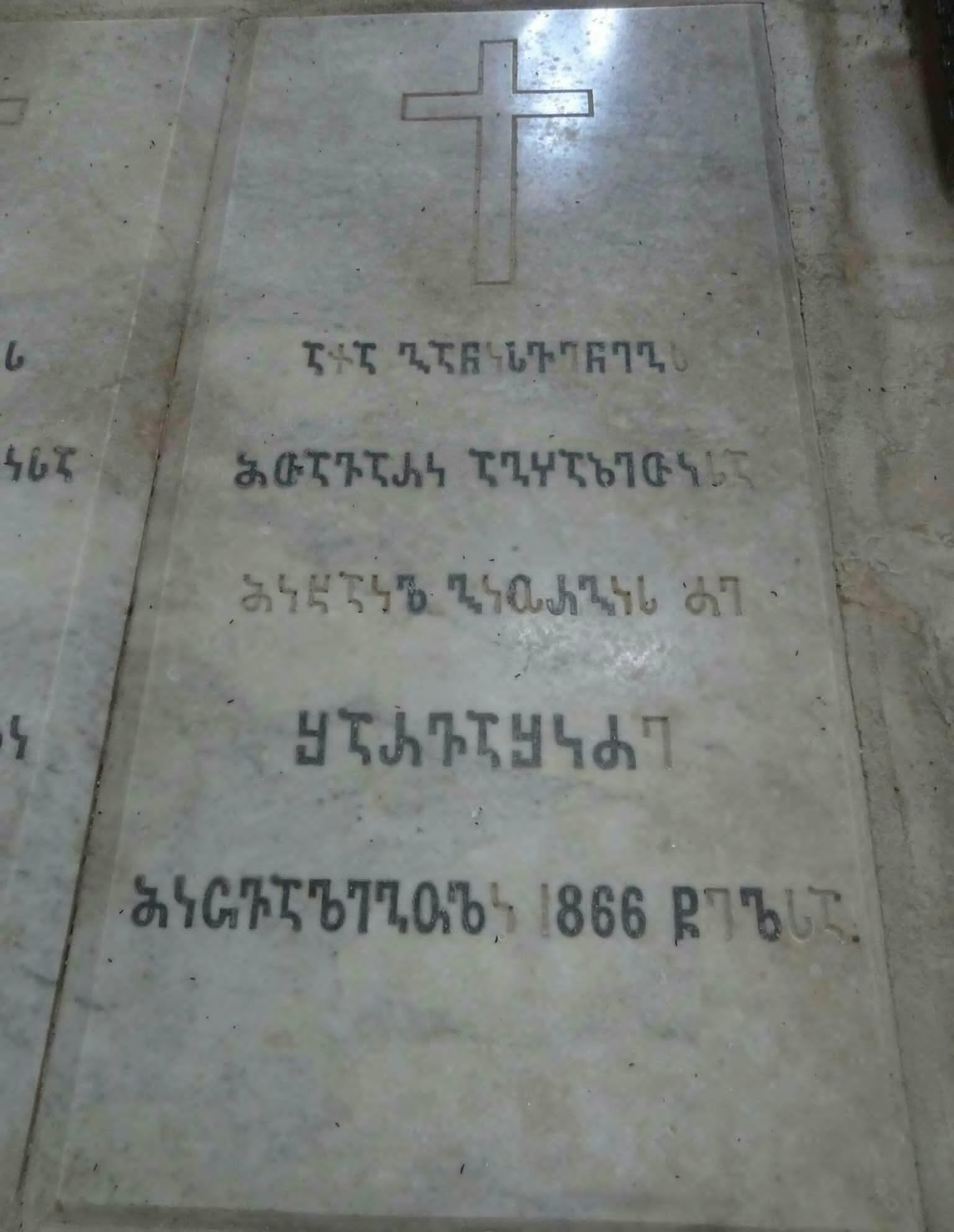
Gravestone of the last ruler of principality of Abkhazia Mikheil (Khamut-Bey) Sharvashidze in Mokvi

In July 1866 an attempt made by the Russian authorities to collect information concerning the economic conditions of the Abkhaz, for the purpose of taxation, led to the Lykhny revolt. The rebels proclaimed Mikheil Sharvashidze's son Giorgi as prince and marched on Sukhumi. Only the strong Russian reinforcements led by General Dmitry Ivanovich Svyatopolk-Mirsky were able to suppress the revolt by the same August. The harsh Russian reaction led, subsequently, to a considerable emigration of the Abkhaz muhajirs to the Ottoman Empire, especially after the locals took part in the rebellion of the Caucasian mountaineers incited by the landing of Turkish troops in 1877. As a result, many areas became virtually deserted.

== Rulers ==
The rulers of the Abkhazian principality among the Abkhazian-Abaza are known as Chachba (lit. 'prince over prince').

- Putu Sharvashidze (c. 1580–1620)
- Seteman Sharvashidze (c. 1620–1640)
- Sustar Sharvashidze (c. 1640–1665)
- Zegnak Sharvashidze (c. 1665–1700)
- Rostom Sharvashidze (c. 1700–1730)
- Manuchar Sharvashidze (c. 1730–1750)
- Zurab Sharvashidze (c. 1750–1780)
- Kelesh Ahmed-Bey Sharvashidze (c. 1780–1808)
- Aslan-Bey Sharvashidze (1808–1810)
- Sefer Ali-Bey Sharvashidze (1810–1821)
- Dmitry Sharvashidze (1821–1822)
- Mikhail Sharvashidze (1822–1864)

== See also ==
- Kingdom of Abkhazia
- Caucasian War
- Russian Empire
- History of Abkhazia
- Circassian Genocide
