= Salome Dadiani =

Georgian princess (1848–1913)

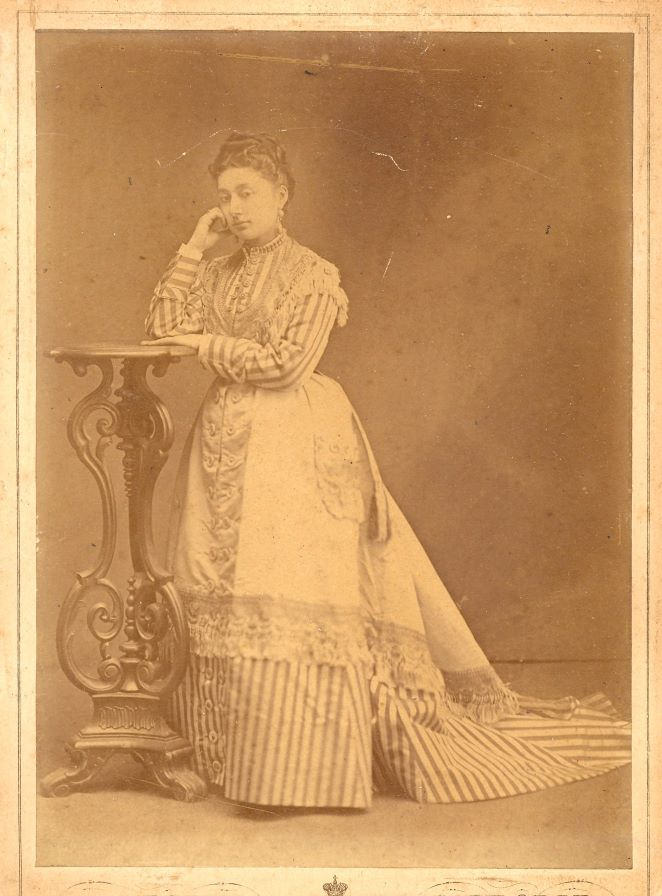
Princess Salomé

Princess Salomé Dadiani (Georgian: სალომე დადიანი; 13 October 1848 – 23 July 1913) was a Georgian princess, the only sister of Niko Dadiani, the last Prince of Mingrelia.

== Early life ==
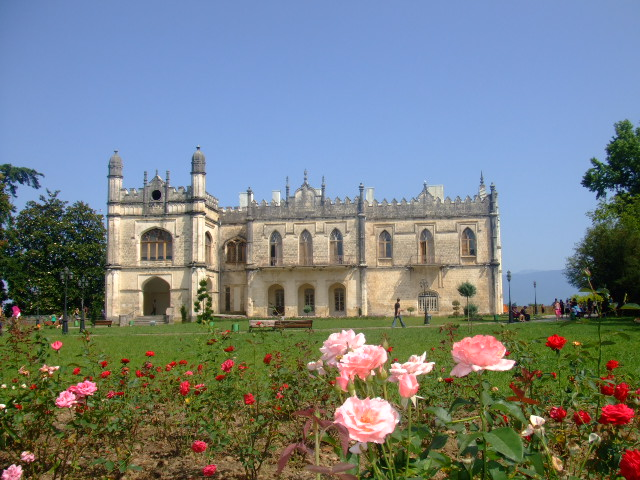
The Dadiani Palace in Zugdidi.

Salomé was born on 13 October 1848. She was a daughter of David Dadiani, Prince of Mingrelia and his wife, Princess Ekaterine Chavchavadze. Her older brother was Prince Niko and her younger brother was Prince Andria.

Her paternal grandfather was Levan V Dadiani. Her maternal grandparents were Princess Salomé Orbeliani and Prince Alexander Chavchavadze, a noted Georgian general and godson of Catherine the Great of Russia. Her grandmother was a great-granddaughter of Erekle II of Eastern Georgia. Her aunt, Princess Nino married the Russian playwright, composer and diplomat Aleksandr Griboyedov, while another aunt, Princess Sophie, married Count Alexandr Nikolai, the minister of education of Imperial Russia.

After her father's death in 1853, her mother assumed the responsibilities of the Prince and was recognized by Nicholas I of Russia as regent of Mingrelia on behalf of her brother Prince Niko. Nicholas assigned her mother a regency council which included her uncles, Prince Grigol Dadiani and Prince Konstantin Dadiani.

== Personal life ==
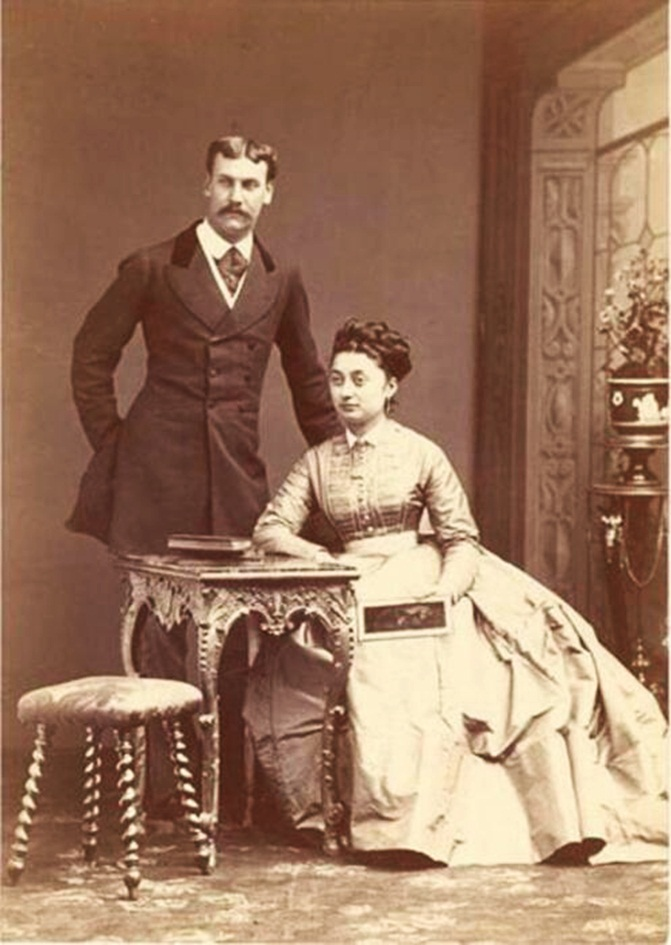
Salomé with her spouse, Prince Achille Murat.

She accompanied her mother in her visit to Paris in 1868. While in Paris, she married Prince Charles Louis Napoléon Achille Murat (1847–1895) on 13 May 1868. Prince Achille, a son of Lucien, 3rd Prince Murat, was a younger brother of Joachim, 4th Prince Murat and a grandson of Marshal of France and King of Naples Joachim Murat and Caroline Bonaparte (the youngest sister of Emperor Napoleon). Together, they were the parents of:

- Prince Lucien Charles David Napoléon (1870–1933), who married Marie Augustine de Rohan-Chabot on 27 February 1895. She was a daughter of Alain de Rohan-Chabot, 11th Duke of Rohan. Her older sister, Marie-Joséphine de Rohan-Chabot, was the wife of Louis de Talleyrand-Périgord (grandson of Louis de Talleyrand-Périgord and nephew of Boson de Talleyrand-Périgord). After the Prince's death in 1933, his widow married French writer and diplomat Count Charles de Chambrun.
- Prince Louis Napoléon Achille Charles (1878–1943), major general in the Russian Army, who died in Nice, France in 1943.
- Princess Antoinette Caroline Catherine (1879–1954).

The couple moved to Algiers after Murat was posted there on a military command, moving back to Paris in 1870, where they remained until the fall of Napoleon III. They then moved to a Dadiani family estate in Samegrelo, grew grapes and established a winery.

She returned with her children to Paris after the death of her husband in 1895, dying there in 1913.

== See also ==
- Mingrelians
- List of Georgians
- List of Georgian princely families
