= House of Dadiani =

Noble family from Western Georgia

Dadiani დადიანი
- Nobility
- Parent house: House of Vardanisdze
- Country: Georgia
- Titles: Grand duke of Odishi; Prince of Mingrelia
- Estates: Mingrelia; Abkhazia (Region); Guria; Lechkhumi; Svaneti; Bedia; Samokalako; Tskhumi

The House of Dadiani (Georgian: დადიანი [dadiani]), later known as the House of Dadiani-Chikovani, was a Georgian family of nobles, dukes and princes, and a ruling dynasty of the western Georgian province of Samegrelo.

== The House of Dadiani ==
The earliest records concerning the family date back to 1046. Presumably, the Dadiani descended from a certain Dadi, who belonged to the House of Vardanisdze. The Vardanisdzes were a Svan noble family who held estates in Svaneti.

Appointed as hereditary eristavi (dukes) of Odishi (Samegrelo) in reward for their military services, the family had become the most powerful feudal house in western Georgia by the 1280s. At that time, the branches of the family also governed Svaneti, Guria, and Bedia.

In 1542, Duke Levan I Dadiani became hereditary Prince (mtavari) of Mingrelia and established himself as an independent ruler. His descendant, Prince Levan III Dadiani, was forced to abdicate in 1691 and Dadiani’s relatives from the House of Chikovani, hitherto Princes of Salipartiano, inherited the title of Princes of Mingrelia and the surname of Dadiani. The original dynasty of Dadiani thus went extinct into what genealogists have termed the House of Dadiani-Chikovani.

Accepting Russian sovereignty in 1802, the Dadiani were elevated to the dignity of Prince of the Russian Empire (Russian: Дадиани) and enjoyed significant independence in their home affairs.

Russia led a de facto annexation of Samegrelo in 1857, but Samegrelo retained its nominal existence until January 4, 1867, when Niko Dadiani, the last Prince of Samegrelo, was deposed and the principality was abolished.

Prince Niko Dadiani officially renounced his rights to the throne in 1868.

== Dadiani vs Dadányi ==
In the late 18th century, in the Hungarian part of the Holy Roman Empire, emerged a newly nobilitated family named Dadányi de Gyülvész. In order to improve their genealogy during the nineteenth century this family invented the legend that a Mingrelian ancestor, George Dadiani, had fled to Hungary because of a conflict with his brother, Grigol Dadiani. However, when asked about the proof, members of the family stated that an iron safe containing the documents that would have proved their ancestry had been lost during a robbery in Hungary. According to this legend, the Dadányi family from Hungary were an offspring of the Dadiani Princes of Mingrelia, while in fact, they descended from the Moschopolitan merchants of Aromanian ancestry.

== Dukes (eristavi) and Princes (mtavari) of Mingrelia ==
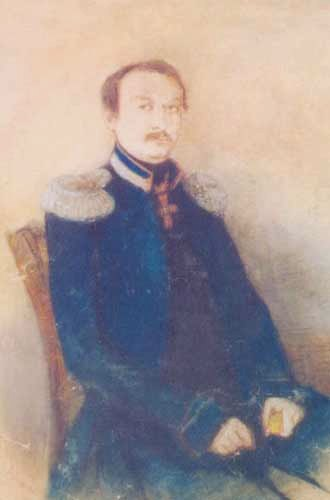
David Dadiani, Ruler of Mingrelia

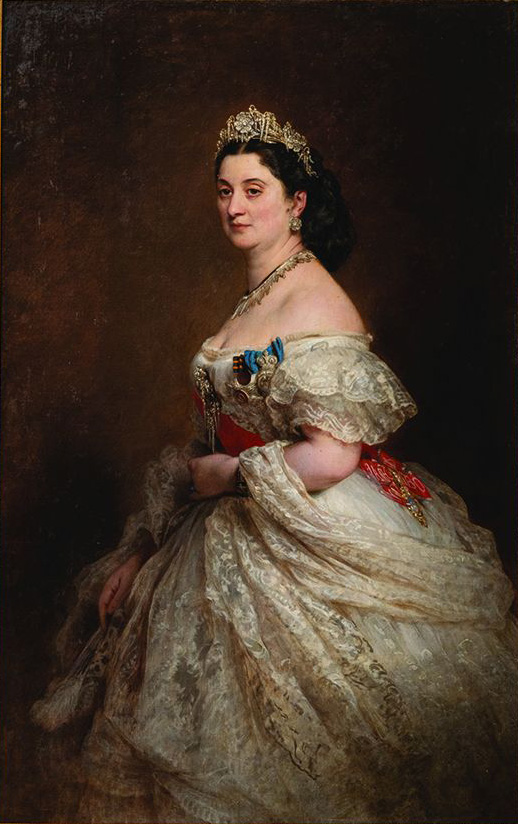
Ekateriné Dadiani-Chavchavadze, Princess of Mingrelia

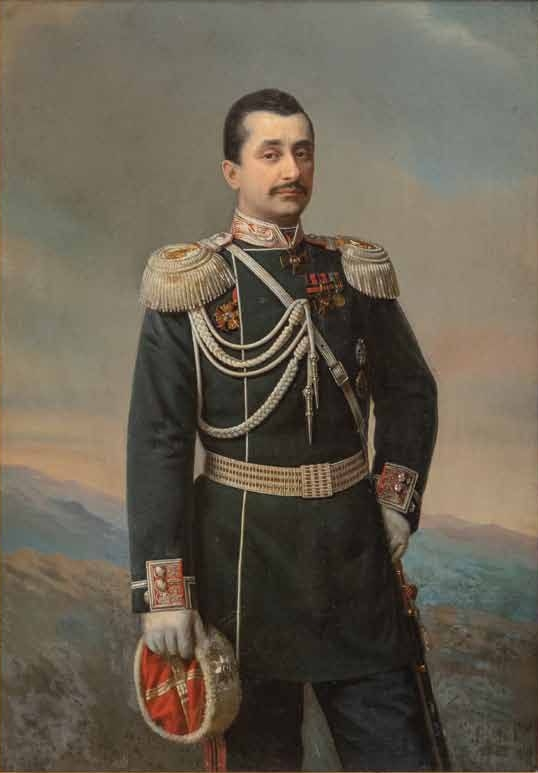
Niko Dadiani, elder son of David

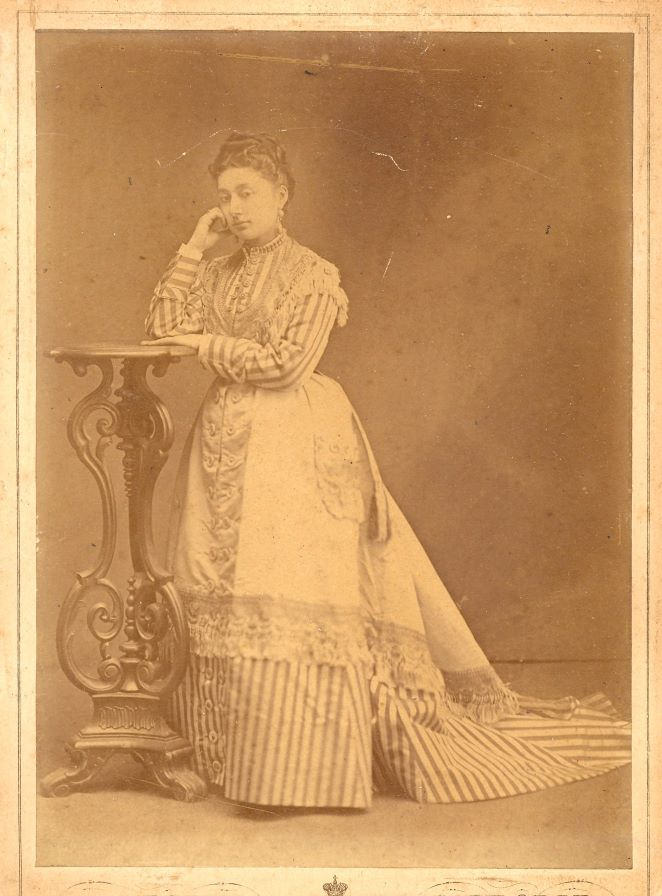
Salome Dadiani, Daughter of David

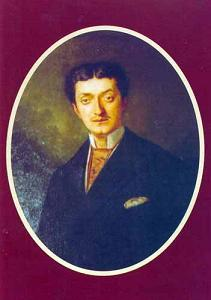
Andria Dadiani, Younger Son of David

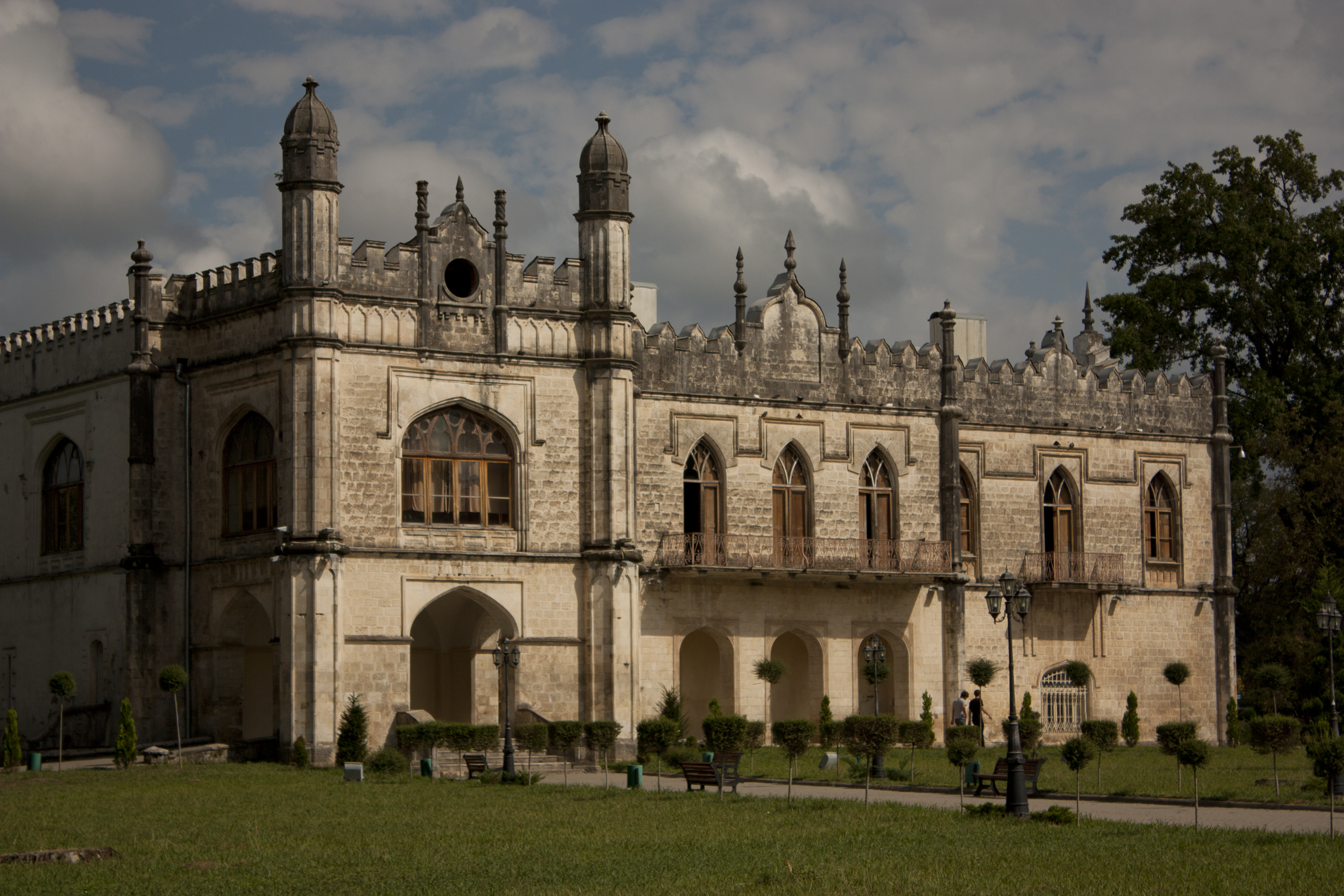
Dadiani Palace in Zugdidi.

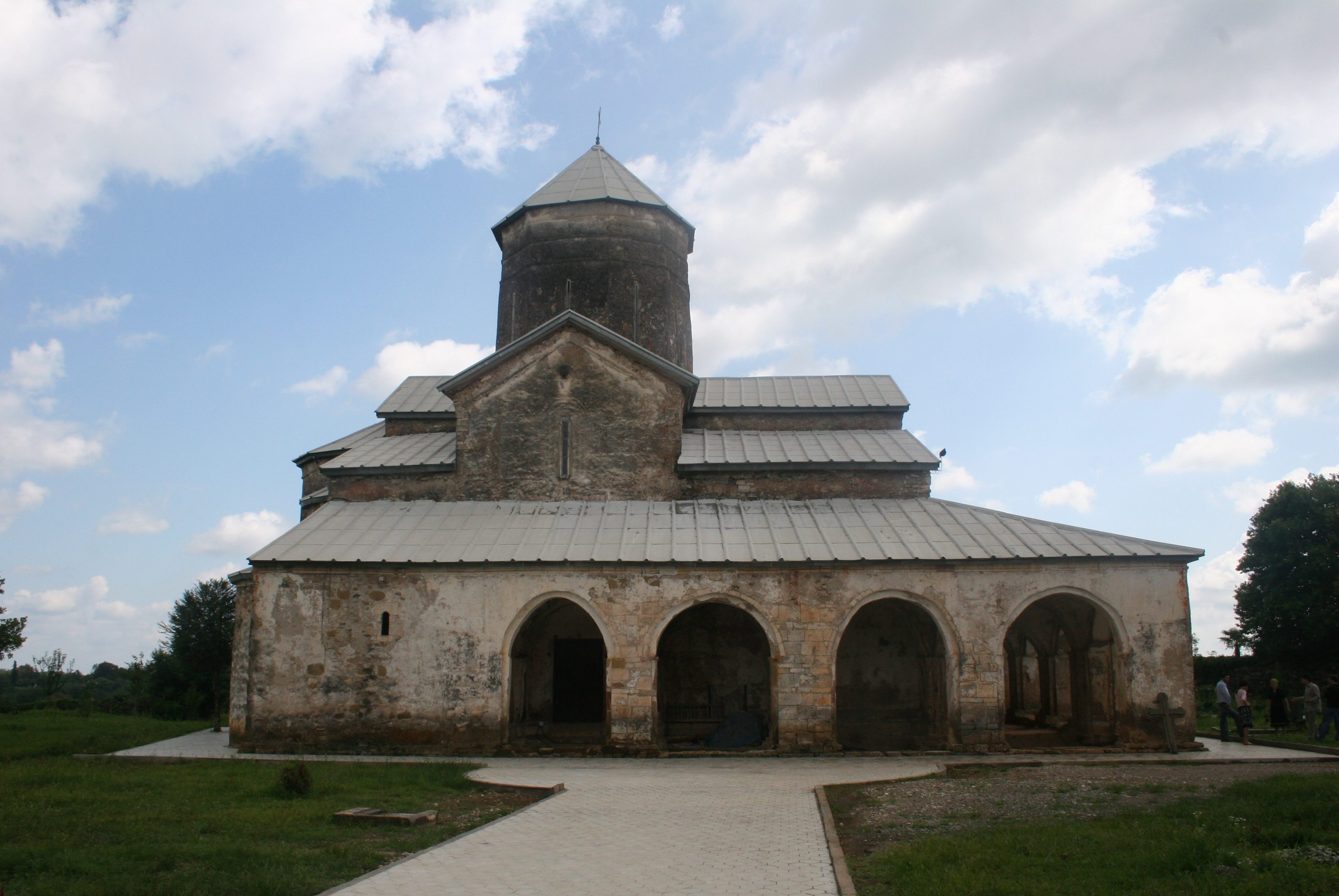
Tsalenjikha Cathedral which contains the Dadiani dynastic chapels. Built in the 12-14th century.

- Vardan I Dadiani (c. 1180s – 1190s)
- Shergil Dadiani (c. 1220s – 1240s)
- Vardan II Dadiani (c. 1240s – 1250s)
- Tsotne Dadiani (c. 1260s)
- Bedan Dadiani (c. 1270s – c. 1290s)
- George I Dadiani (c. 1293 – 1323)
- Mamia I Dadiani (1323–1345)
- George II Dadiani (1345–1384)
- Vameq I Dadiani (1384–1396)
- Mamia II Dadiani (1396–1414)
- Liparit I Dadiani (1414–1470)
- Shamadavle Dadiani (1470–1473)
- Vameq II Dadiani (1474–1482)
- Liparit II Dadiani (1482–1512)
- Mamia III Dadiani (1512–1533)
- Levan I Dadiani (1533–1546)
- George III Dadiani (1546–1573, 1574–1582)
- Mamia IV Dadiani (1574, 1582–1590)
- Manuchar I Dadiani (1590–1611)
- Levan II Dadiani (1611–1657)
- Liparit III Dadiani (1657–1658)
- Vameq III Dadiani (1658–1661)
- Levan III Dadiani (1661–1681)
- Levan IV Dadiani (1681–1691)
- George IV Dadiani (Lipartiani) (1700–1704, 1710–1714)
- Katsia I Dadiani (1704–1710)
- Bezhan Dadiani (1714–1728)
- Otia Dadiani (1728–1758)
- Katsia II Dadiani (1758–1788)
- Grigol Dadiani (1788–1791, 1794–1802, 1802–1804)
- Manuchar II Dadiani (1791–1793)
- Tariel Dadiani (1793–1794, 1802)
- Levan V Dadiani (1804–1840)
- David Dadiani (1840–1853)
- Niko I Dadiani (1853–1857)

== Heads of the Princely House of Mingrelia ==
- Prince Niko I Dadiani (1857–1903), last Prince of Mingrelia
- Prince Niko II Dadiani (1903–1919), son of Prince Niko I Dadiani
- Prince Grigori [Koki] Dadiani (1919–1924), son of Prince Grigori [Gita] Dadiani (first cousin of Niko I Dadiani)
- Grigori Dadiani (1924–1976), son of Prince Grigori [Koki] Dadiani
- Nodar Dadiani (1976–1989), elder son of Grigori Dadiani
- Levanti Dadiani (1989–present), current Head of the Princely House of Mingrelia, cadet son of Grigori Dadiani
- Nicolas Dadiani (b. 1947), heir apparent, great-great-great-grandson of Tariel Dadiani

== Other members of the family ==
- Mariam Dadiani, a 17th-century princess
- Constantine Dadiani, a 19th-century poet and general of Russian army
- Andria Dadiani (1850–1910), chess player and tournament patron
- Ekaterine Dadiani (1816–1882), Princess Regent of Mingrelia
- Salome Dadiani (1848–1913), wife of Prince Achille Murat (son of Lucien, Prince Murat)
- Samson Dadiani (1886-1937), Georgian politician
- Shalva Dadiani (1874–1959), prominent writer and dramatist
- Eleesa Dadiani (born 1988), art gallery owner
