= List of botanical gardens in Georgia =

List of botanical gardens in Georgia may refer to:

- List of botanical gardens in Georgia (country)
- List of botanical gardens and arboretums in Georgia (U.S. state)
