= Zugdidi Botanical Garden =

Botanical garden in Zugdidi, Georgia

Coordinates: 42°30′41″N 41°52′41″E

Zugdidi Botanical Garden

Zugdidi Botanical Garden (Georgian: ზუგდიდის ბოტანიკური ბაღი), Zugdidi branch of Central Botanical Garden administered by the Georgian Academy of Sciences; was built in the late 19th century by the prince of Samegrelo David Dadiani, near his residence. The garden now has over eighty genus of exotic plants introduced from southeast Asia, India, Japan, Mediterranean and the Americas.

== History ==
David Dadiani ruler of Samegrelo began the construction of a decorative garden in 1840. That year, he fenced in a forest area surrounding the palace, which was he considered his "Baghdad Palace" and set up a specialist institution for horticultural sciences. Soon care and its management of the estate passed to his wife, Ekaterina Chavchavadze-Dadiani. Ekaterina was enthusiastic about her work, and in a short time had stocked the garden with a great variety of native and exotic plants.

== Management ==
In 1922, the People's Commissariat of Education appointed Georgian scientist A. Chanturia as director of the garden. After 1926 the garden fell under the writ of the Georgian SSR Tbilisi Botanical Garden. The New Director of the Botanical Garden, I. Lomouri decried the dire state of the garden. He sent Professor Sosnovski, to describe and account for trees and shrubs, fenced garden area of a living fence, cleaned and restored some of the alley, planted box-curbs and so forth.

Control of the garden changed hands a few times, before it fell in Zugdidi City Council, who turned it into a culture and leisure park hosting a varieties of events, entertainment, and attractions, but the care and development of the plant collection was neglected.

Finally, in 1970, by a resolution of the Georgian SSR Council of Ministers in 1970, Zugdidi Botanical Gardens in Central Park was given to the Academy of Sciences and was renamed the "Georgian SSR Academy of Sciences, Central Botanical Garden Branch."

A short period of time-consuming work brought the garden to conditions suitable for scientific research work. 350 new species and sakheskhvaobis saplings were added to the garden nursery, which will soon be moved to permanent areas in the park.

In 2005, the Government of the Dadianis Palace Garden allocated 40 thousand lari for reconstruction.

In May 2009 Zugdidi Chairman Otar Patsatsia, and Zugdidi Municipality MP Fridon Todua Alexander Kobalia made the decision to provide measures for heavy reconstruction in the Botanical Garden. The decision of the Zugdidi district administration from the local budget will come to 5,000 lari per month.
