= Nino Chavchavadze =

Georgian-Russian aristocrat (1812–1857)

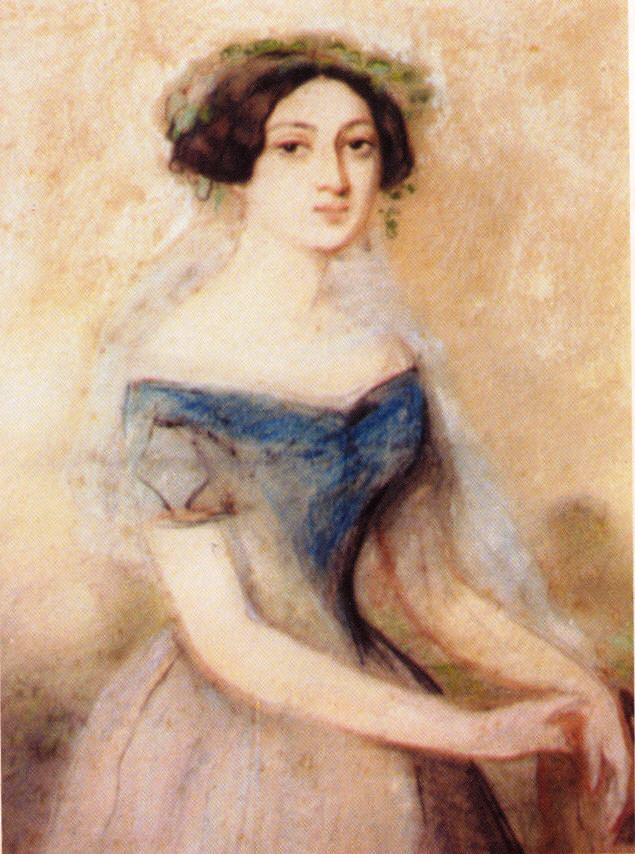
Princess Nino Chavchavadze

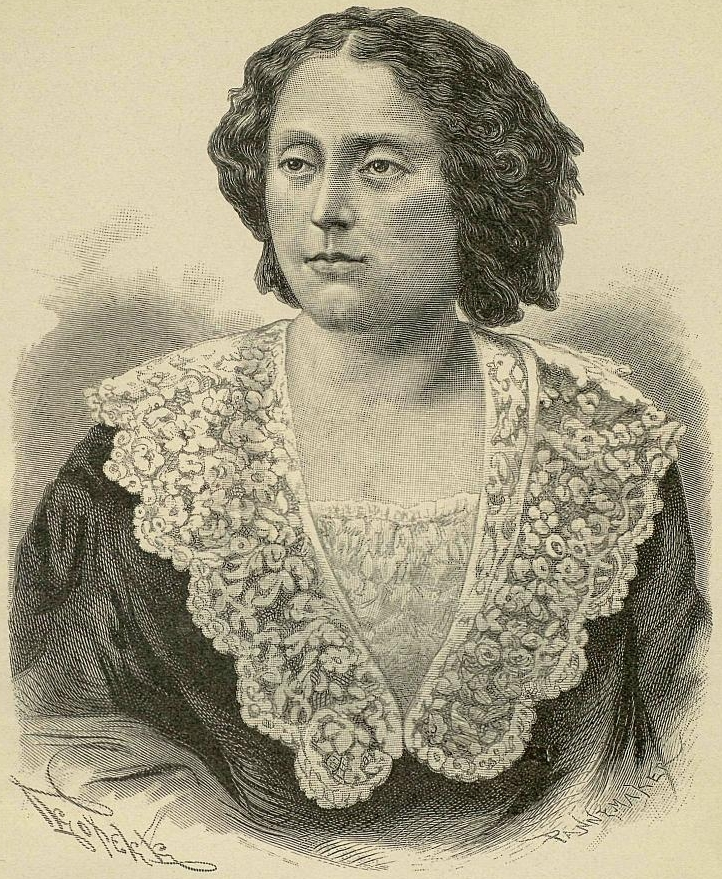
Nino Chavchavadze

Princess Nino Chavchavadze (Georgian: ნინო ჭავჭავაძე; also known as Nina Alexandrovna Griboyedova in a Russian manner) (November 4, 1812 – June 28, 1857) was a daughter of the famous Georgian knyaz (prince) and poet Alexander Chavchavadze and wife of Russian diplomat and playwright Alexander Griboyedov.

== Life ==
Nino was raised in the Tsinandali palace, eastern Georgia, where her father was writing his historical novels and poetry. When Nino turned sixteen, she met Russian poet and novelist Alexander Griboyedov during one of her father's parties in Tiflis. Griboyedov proposed to her soon after the meeting and they married at Tbilisi Sioni Cathedral on August 22, 1828. Later in the same year, she accompanied her husband on his fatal mission to Persia, but Nino became ill and Griboyedov chose to leave her in Tabriz. After hearing of her husband’s death in Teheran (January 30, 1829), Nino gave birth to a premature child, who died soon after. Pursuant to Griboyedov's will, Nino reburied him to Mount Mtatsminda, Tbilisi, and ordered a grave stone with the inscription in Russian: "Your spirit and achievements will be remembered for ever. Why still does my love outlive you?" This epitaph also figures in the novel Ali and Nino by Kurban Said when the couple visits the gravesite in Tbilisi.

She never remarried, rejecting her numerous suitors (including the prominent Georgian poet and military commander, Grigol Orbeliani, who, inspired with hopeless passion towards Nino for thirty years, also never married) and winning universal admiration for her fidelity to his memory. She spent most of her unhappy life in the Tsinandali residence, frequently visiting Tiflis and her sister, Ekaterine, in Mingrelia.

Nino died in 1857, and was buried next to Griboyedov. On the burial stone of Alexandr Griboyedov at the Mtatsminda Pantheon in Tbilisi, the statue of Nino is depicted weeping over the death of her beloved husband.

== See also ==
- Chavchavadze, Georgian surname
- Georgia within the Russian Empire
