= Ika Meporia =

Ukrainian footballer

Ika Meporiya
Personal information
- Full name: Ika Guramovych Meporiya
- Date of birth: 26 January 1989 (age 37)
- Place of birth: Zugdidi, Georgian SSR, Soviet Union
- Height: 1.76 m (5 ft 9 1/2 in)
- Position: Midfielder

Youth career
- 2004–2006: FC Vidradnyi Kyiv
- 2006: FC Dynamo Kyiv

Senior career*
Years	Team	Apps	(Gls)
2008–2012	FC Arsenal Kyiv	3	(0)
2011	→ FC Naftovyk-Ukrnafta Okhtyrka (loan)	13	(0)
2011	→ FC Prykarpattya Ivano-Frankivsk (loan)	1	(0)
- * Club domestic league appearances and goals

Ika Meporiya (Ukrainian: Іка Гурамович Мепорія; born 26 January 1989) is a former professional Ukrainian of Georgian descent football midfielder who plays for FC Arsenal Kyiv.

In 2003, he moved to Ukraine and got Ukrainian citizenship.

== Career ==
Ika Meporiya made his professional debut for FC Arsenal Kyiv Youth in the Ukrainian Premier League Reserves. On 23 August 2010, he made his professional debut for Arsenal Kyiv.
