= Eleesa Dadiani =

Cryptocurrency broker and art entrepreneur

- Born: 25 July 1988 (age 37); Tbilisi, Georgia
- Website: https://dadianisyndicate.co.uk

Eleesa Dadiani (born 25 July 1988) is a London-based cryptocurrency broker, digital entrepreneur, fine art gallery owner and media commentator. Her art gallery, Dadiani Fine Art, was the first art gallery in the world to sell art exclusively in cryptocurrency.

== Biography ==
Dadiani is of mixed heritage, born in Tbilisi, Georgia of Georgian, Russian and Mountain Jewish descent. Dadiani herself is Christian Orthodox. Through her paternal grandmother, she is a descendant of the House of Dadiani.

== Dadiani Fine Art ==
In 2014 Dadiani founded Dadiani Fine Art, in London's Mayfair district to promote her father's art collection, but, due to EU sanctions, was unable to ship the works from Russia to the UK. She therefore started putting on her own exhibitions and describes herself as an art dealer "almost by accident".

In January 2018 Dadiani Fine Art exhibited British artists Paul Wager, Michael Sandle and David Mach with pieces available for sale exclusively in cryptocurrency. Dadiani Fine Art thereby became the first art gallery in UK to sell pieces of art in cryptocurrency and the first gallery in the world to sell art exclusively in cryptocurrency.

Artists to have been exhibited at Dadiani Fine Art include Nicholas Roerich, Ivan Aivazovsky, William S. Burroughs, Natalia Goncharova, Cecil Beaton, Norman Toynton and Keith Milow, Philipp Humm.

== Dadiani Syndicate ==
In 2017 Dadiani founded Dadiani Syndicate, the UK's first brokerage to offer high value assets, including fine art, sports cars and properties, for purchase via cryptocurrency. In late 2017, they facilitated the sale of four F1 cars, valued at £4m, in Litecoin to an anonymous Chinese purchaser.

In 2018 Dadiani auctioned a 49% share of Andy Warhol's "14 small electric chairs" (1980) in cryptocurrency., the first time that a blue-chip piece of art had been publicly sold in cryptocurrency. The 49% share had been tokenised and sold via the blockchain, enabling investors to buy a fraction of the piece.

== Media profile ==
Dadiani is a regular contributor to City AM. In 2018, Dadiani was featured on a BBC Panorama episode about the rise of cryptocurrency. Later that year The Spectator magazine listed Dadiani as one of their "queens of cryptocurrency; she has subsequently been dubbed by various media outlets as the "Queen of Crypto".
