= List of botanical gardens in Georgia (country) =

Botanical gardens in Georgia have collections consisting entirely of Georgia native and endemic species; most have a collection that include plants from around the world. There are botanical gardens and arboreta in all states and territories of Georgia, most are administered by local governments, some are privately owned.

- Bakuriani Botanical Garden of The Ketskhoveli Institute of Botany of the Georgian Academy of Sciences
- Batumi Botanical Garden of the Georgian Academy of Sciences
- Tbilisi Botanical Garden of the Georgian Academy of Sciences
- Sukhumi Botanical Garden
- Zugdidi Botanical Garden
