= Zugdidi =

Zugdidi ზუგდიდი
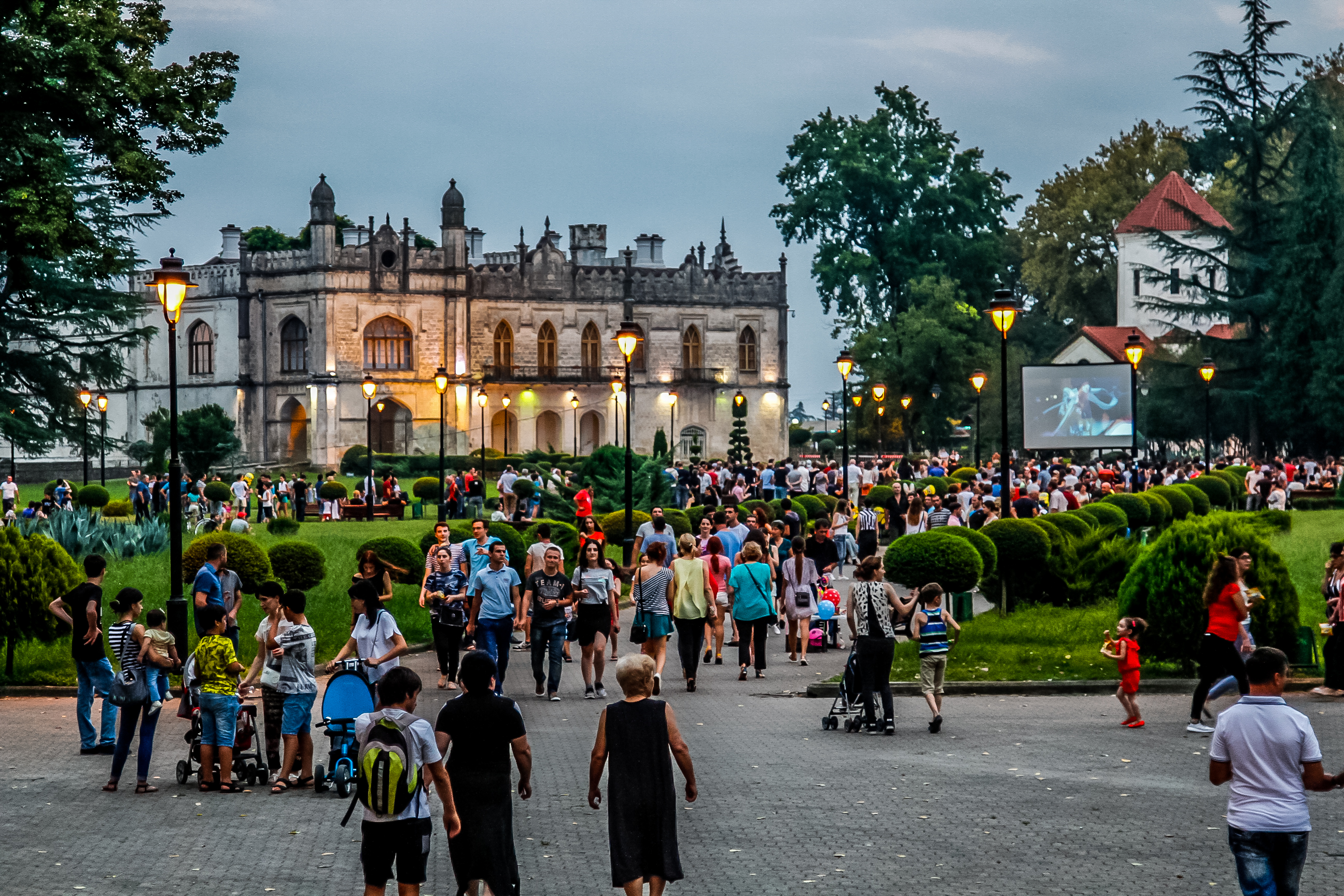
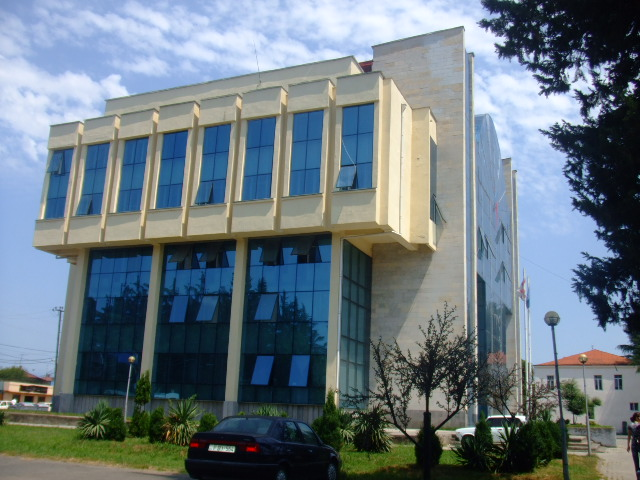
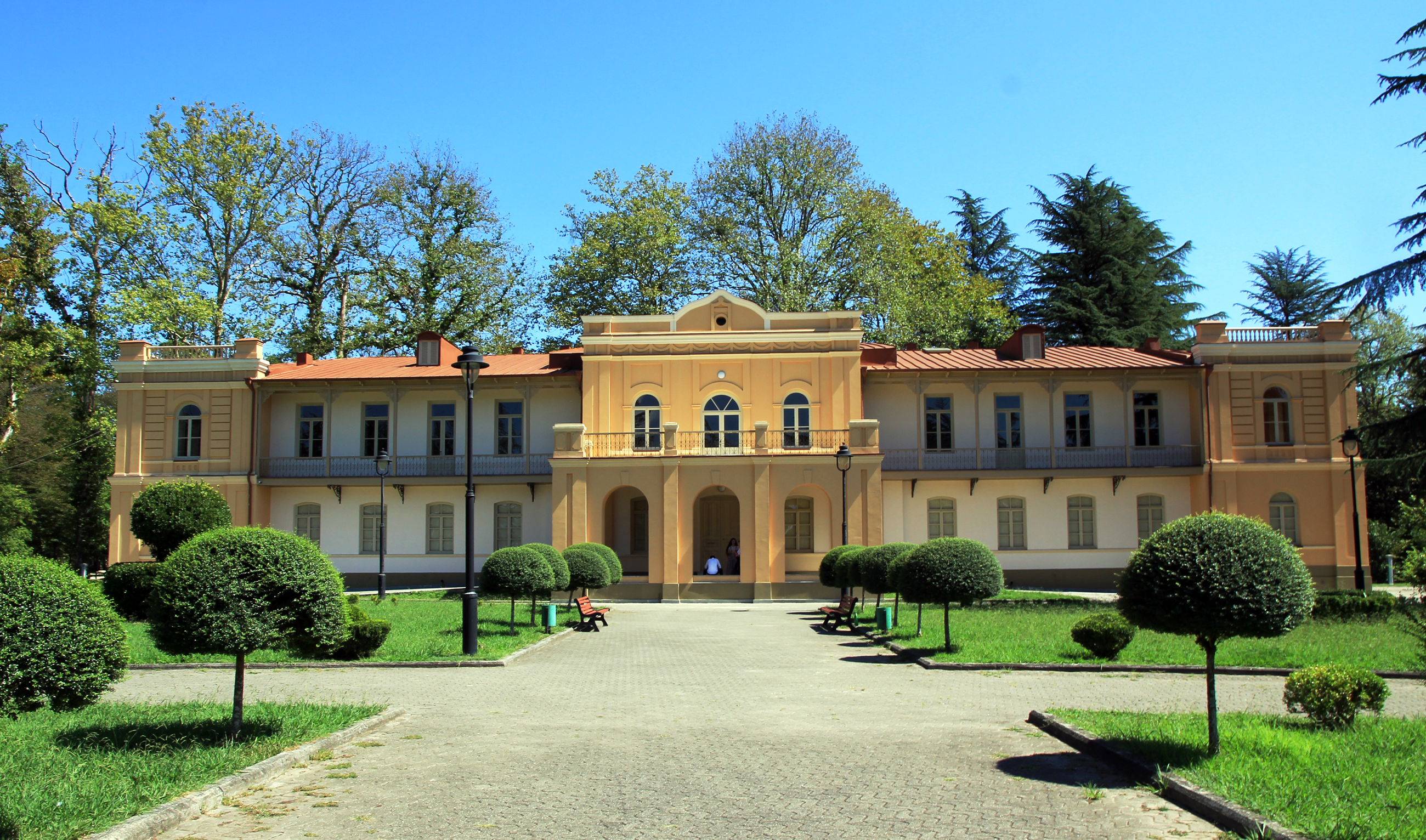
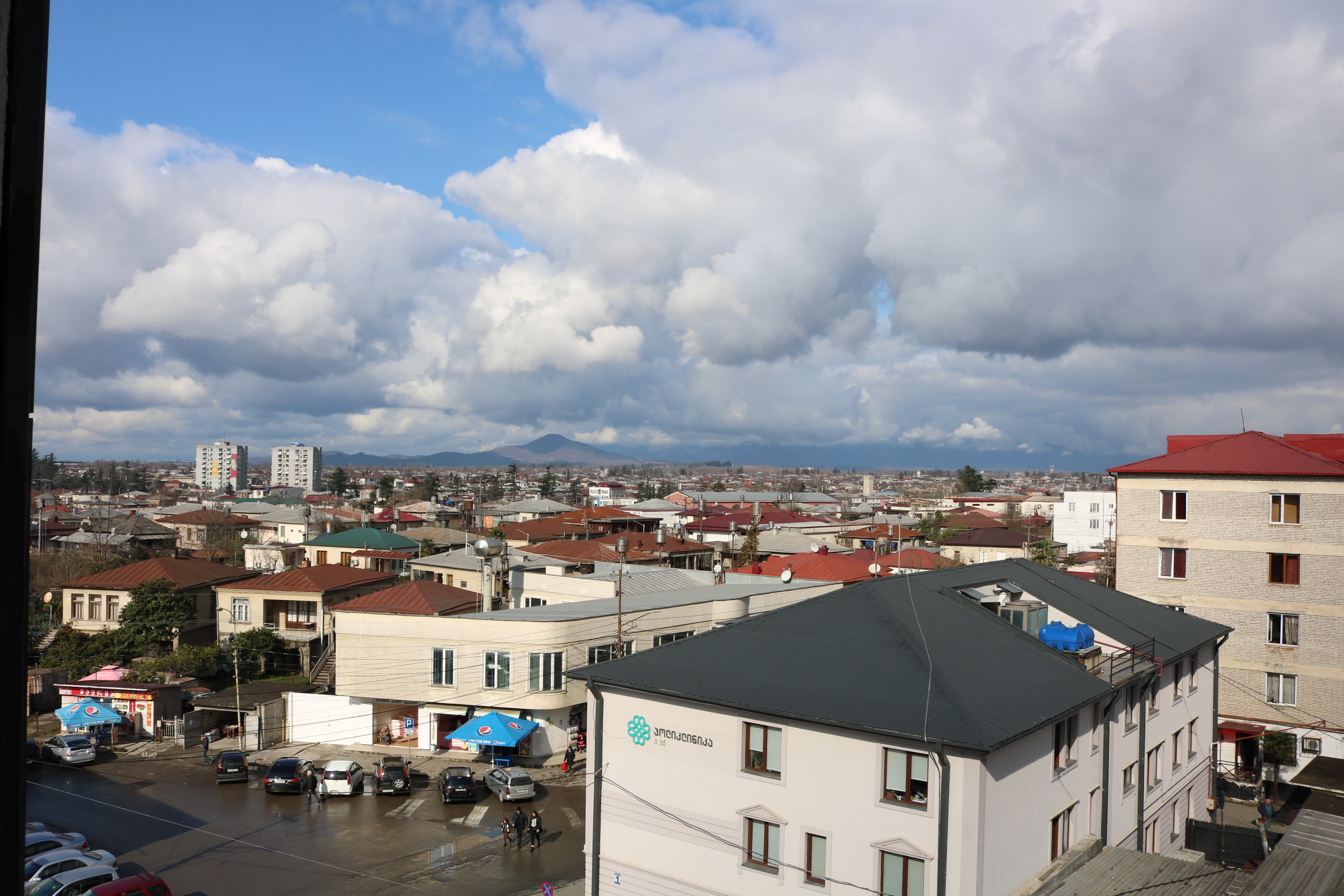
- Dadiani Palace Zugdidi Town Hall Dadiani Summer Palace View of Zugdidi

- Flag Coat of arms

- Location within Georgia Location within Samegrelo-Zemo Svaneti
- Coordinates: 42°30′30″N 41°52′0″E
- Country: Georgia
- Mkhare: Samegrelo-Zemo Svaneti
- District: Zugdidi

Government
  - Mayor: Mamuka Tsotseria (GD)

Area
  - Total: 21.8 km^{2} (8.4 sq mi)
- Elevation: 100 m (330 ft)

Population (January 1, 2024)
  - Total: 40,100
  - Density: 1,840/km^{2} (4,760/sq mi)
- Time zone: UTC+4 (Georgian Time)
- Postal code: 2100
- Website: www.zugdidi.gov.ge/en

Zugdidi (Georgian: ზუგდიდი [ˈz̪ugd̪id̪i]; Mingrelian: ზუგდიდი or ზუგიდი) is a city in the western Georgian historical province of Samegrelo (Mingrelia). It is situated in the north-west of that province. The city is located 318 kilometres west of Tbilisi, 30 km from the Black Sea coast and 30 km from the Egrisi Range, at an elevation of 100–110 metres above sea level. Zugdidi is the capital of the Samegrelo-Zemo Svaneti region, which combines Samegrelo (Mingrelia) and upper part of Svaneti, and the centre of the Zugdidi Municipality within. Zugdidi is the sixth most populous city in Georgia.

The city serves as a residence of the Metropolitan of Zugdidi and Tsaishi Eparchy of the Georgian Apostolic Autocephalous Orthodox Church.

== Etymology ==
The name "Zugdidi" (ზუგდიდი) first appeared in the 17th century. Literally it means "big hill" in the Mingrelian language (from ზუგუ zugu, 'hill'; დიდი didi 'big'). An alternative version of the name recorded in old sources is "Zubdidi" (ზუბდიდი) with the same meaning as Megrelian. Local Georgian (Megrelian) residents of the historical provinces of Megrelia and Abkhazia also use "Zugidi" (ზუგიდი), which is a shortened form. The name was given to the town because of a hill situated in the eastern part of the city, where some small remains of an ancient fortress are still visible.

== History ==
Historically Zugdidi was the capital of the Principality of Mingrelia (Odishi) until 1867 when the principality was abolished by the Russian Empire. After that Zugdidi was an administrative centre of Zugdidi Uyezd as a part of the Kutais Governorate until 1918, when it became a part of the Democratic Republic of Georgia. From 1930 onwards, it served as the centre of the Zugdidi Raion of the Georgian Soviet Socialist Republic and then Independent Georgia (from 1991).

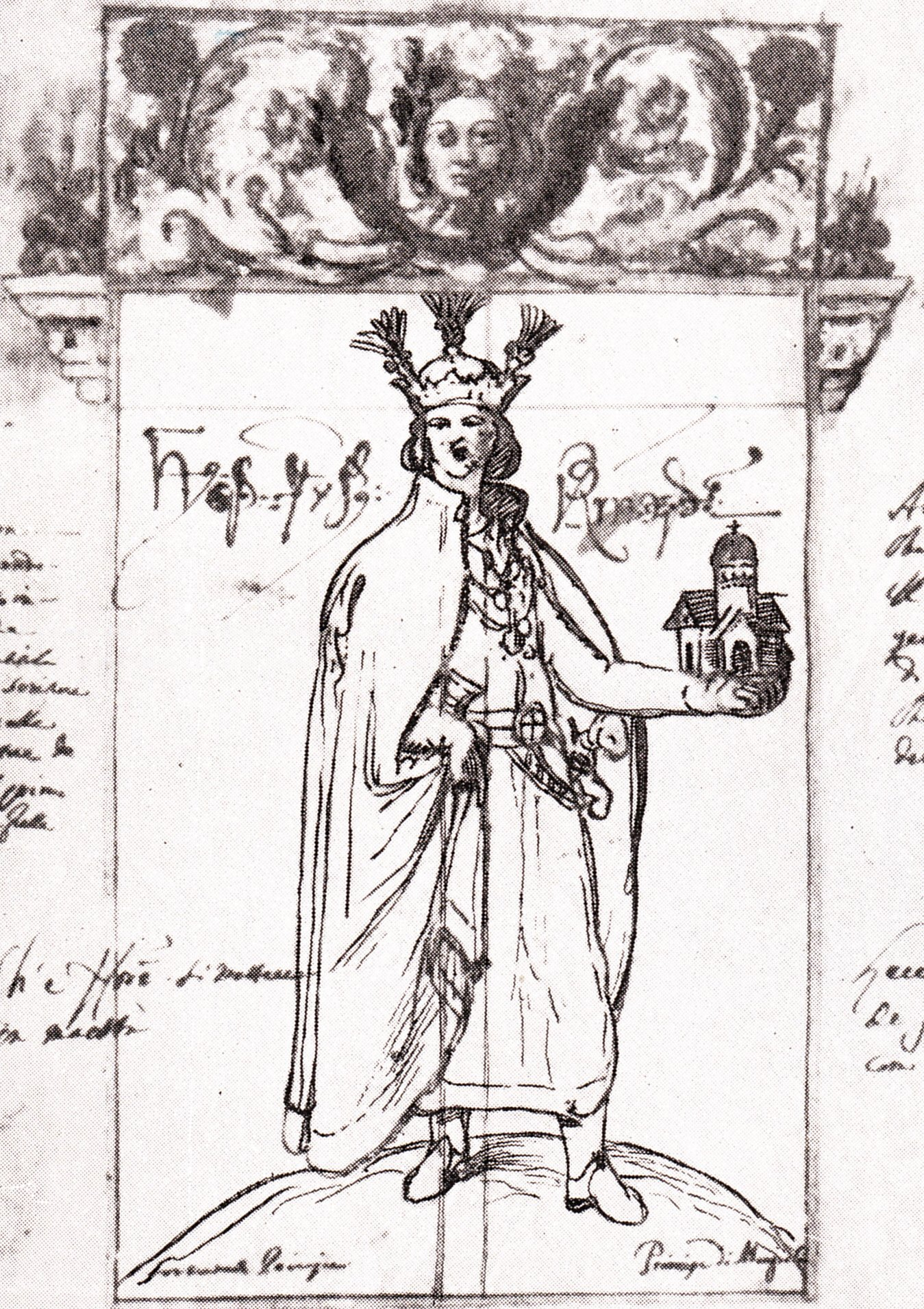
Prince Levan II Dadiani by Teramo Castelli

Between the 17th and 19th centuries, Zugdidi was one of the important political and cultural centres of Mingrelia, as well as of Georgia as a whole. A famous Georgian medieval epic poem, The Knight in the Panther's Skin, was rewritten there by Mamuka Tavakalashvili at the court of Prince Levan II Dadiani, in 1646.

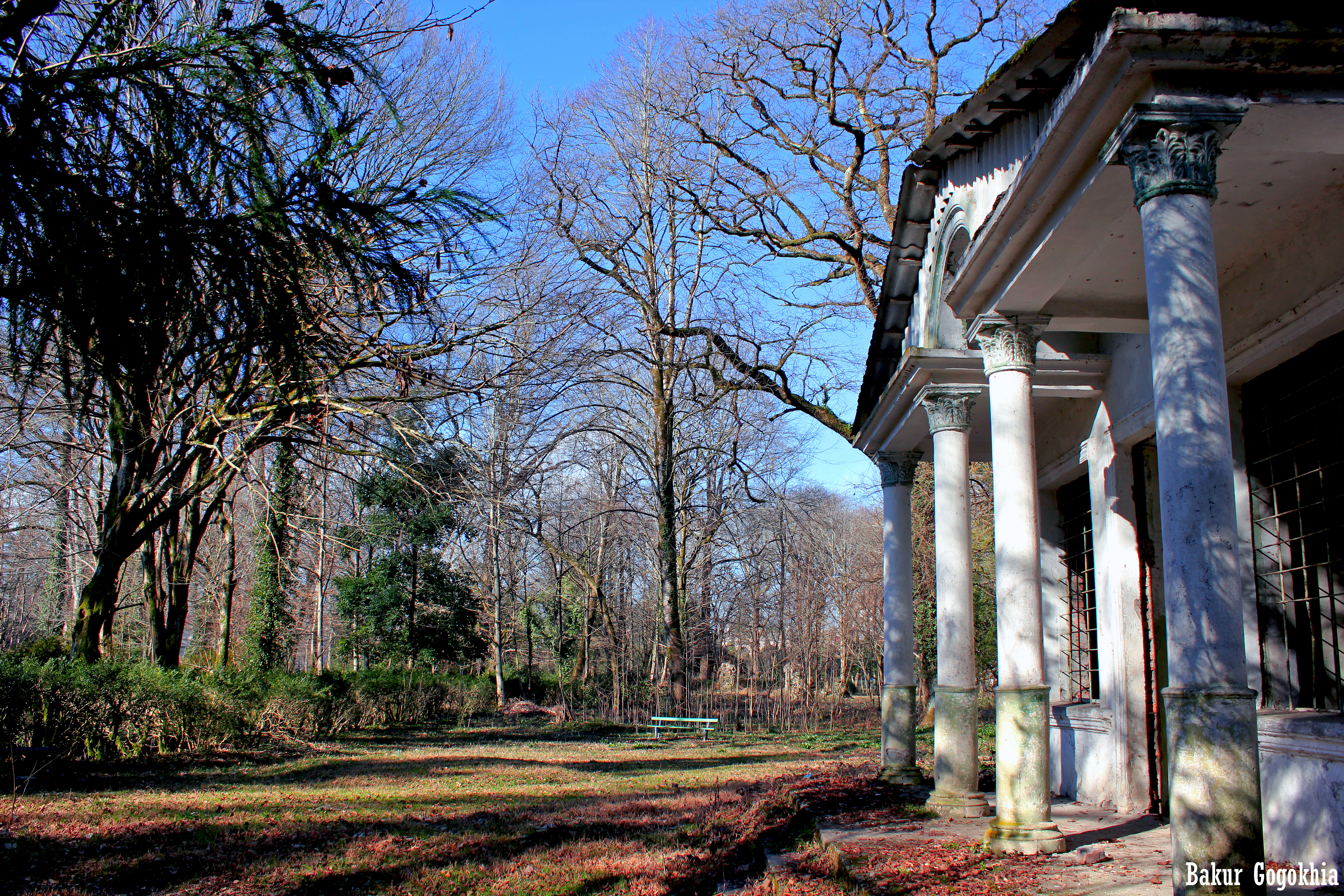
Zugdidi Botanical Garden

During the Crimean War (1853–1856) Ottoman forces under the command of Omar Pasha seized Zugdidi in 1855. At the end of the 1855 and beginning of 1856, the city was liberated by the Mingrelian Militia commanded by Major General Prince Grigol Dadiani. By the order of Iskender Pasha, Ottomans plundered, burnt and destroyed the whole city, especially palaces and botanical garden. During the Russian Empire, the city was the administrative center of the Zugdidi Uyezd of the Kutaisi Governorate. Many buildings were heavily damaged during the Georgian Civil War (1992–1993).

In 1993, the local administration joined the first president of Georgia Zviad Gamsakhurdia, and the Supreme Council of the Republic of Georgia, in their fight against various separatist movements.

== Architecture and landmarks ==
=== Dadiani Palace ===
Dadiani Palace, built in the 19th century, was home to the final ruling family of the Principality of Samegrelo. The complex includes the palace of Ekaterine Dadiani of Samegrelo; a residence for her son, Niko Dadiani; a monastery; and what is now the Zugdidi Botanical Garden. Today, the palace operates as a museum and is open to visitors. It underwent renovations from 2015 to 2018.

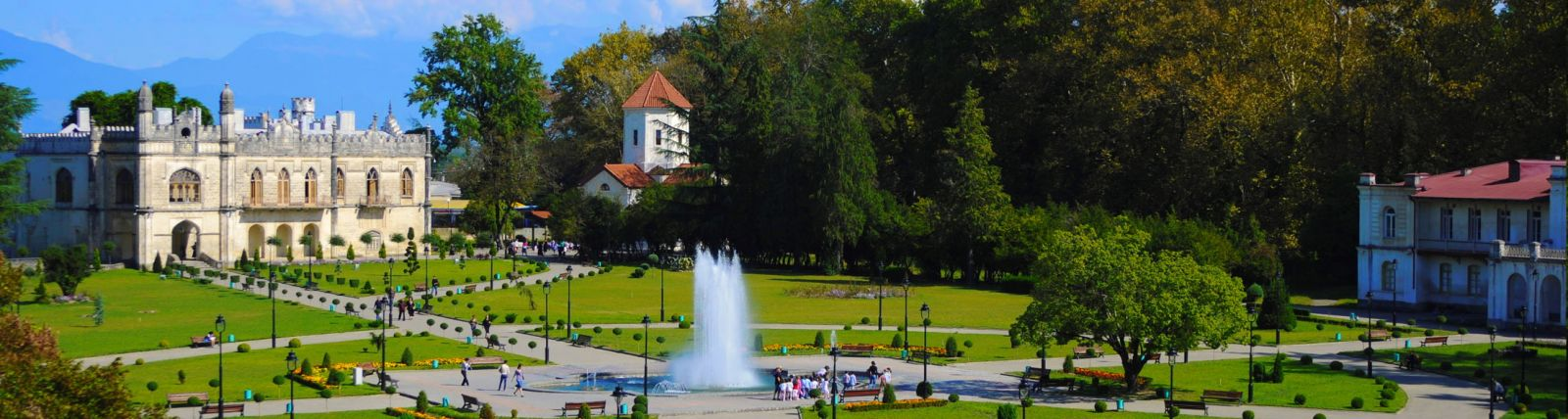
Dadiani Palaces Museum and Cathedral of Blachernae St. Virgin Icon

=== Botanical Garden ===
Zugdidi Botanical Garden was established in the 19th century by the Prince of Mingrelia David Dadiani and Queen Ekaterine, near the residential palaces. Currently, the garden is a branch of Tbilisi Central Botanical Garden and is administered by the Georgian Academy of Sciences. The garden covers 26 hectares.

=== Shalva Dadiani Zugdidi State Academic Drama Theater ===
This theater's first performance, Molière's Le médecin malgré lui (The Doctor Despite Himself), was staged on 11 April 1869 by Anton Purtseladze. The Drama Theater was founded in 1932. In 1959, the theatre was named after the famous Georgian novelist and theatrical actor Shalva Dadiani (1874–1959).

=== Other landmarks ===
- Chakvinji fortress
- Tsaishi cathedral

== Climate ==
Zugdidi has a humid subtropical climate (Cfa) under the Köppen climate classification.

Climate data for Zugdidi (1991–2020, extremes 1981-2020)
Month	Jan	Feb	Mar	Apr	May	Jun	Jul	Aug	Sep	Oct	Nov	Dec	Year
Record high °C (°F)	22.7 (72.9)	24.2 (75.6)	30.9 (87.6)	36.1 (97.0)	38.2 (100.8)	40.0 (104.0)	42.4 (108.3)	39.9 (103.8)	40.4 (104.7)	35.6 (96.1)	29.7 (85.5)	26.4 (79.5)	42.4 (108.3)
Mean daily maximum °C (°F)	10.7 (51.3)	11.8 (53.2)	15.1 (59.2)	20.0 (68.0)	24.0 (75.2)	27.3 (81.1)	29.0 (84.2)	29.8 (85.6)	26.8 (80.2)	22.6 (72.7)	16.9 (62.4)	13.0 (55.4)	20.6 (69.0)
Mean daily minimum °C (°F)	2.0 (35.6)	2.3 (36.1)	5.0 (41.0)	8.3 (46.9)	12.9 (55.2)	17.1 (62.8)	19.7 (67.5)	20.0 (68.0)	15.7 (60.3)	11.3 (52.3)	6.3 (43.3)	3.6 (38.5)	10.4 (50.6)
Record low °C (°F)	−10.0 (14.0)	−10.9 (12.4)	−10.7 (12.7)	−2.2 (28.0)	1.5 (34.7)	8.0 (46.4)	12.1 (53.8)	10.1 (50.2)	4.8 (40.6)	0.0 (32.0)	−3.8 (25.2)	−7.6 (18.3)	−10.9 (12.4)
Average precipitation mm (inches)	140.8 (5.54)	132.0 (5.20)	173.0 (6.81)	128.5 (5.06)	142.4 (5.61)	196.7 (7.74)	171.0 (6.73)	147.2 (5.80)	149.8 (5.90)	177.3 (6.98)	145.5 (5.73)	142.8 (5.62)	1,847 (72.72)
Average precipitation days (≥ 1.0 mm)	12.1	11.4	13	10.8	9.8	9.3	8.6	8	8.6	10	10.4	10.8	122.8
Source: NCEI

== Demography and population ==
Historically Zugdidi is known as a distinctly mono-ethnic city with a vast majority of Georgians. By the 2002 state census, 98.97% (166,039) of its total population (167,760) were ethnic Georgians (for both the city and its municipality).

In the second half of the 1850s, due to the brief Ottoman occupation, the town's population decreased from 2,000 to 800.

The 1950s-1970s were an important period for Zugdidi's development, which affected the growth of the population, while the last 20-year growth was mainly caused by refugee displacement. After the Russian-Georgian war in Abkhazia (1992-1993) a large number of internally displaced peoples from Abkhazia were forced to move to Zugdidi. As a result of this, according to the 2002 state census, Zugdidi became the fifth most populous city in Georgia, ahead of Sokhumi, Poti, and Gori. As of the 2014 national census, the population of Zugdidi decreased to 42,998 inhabitants, making it Georgia's sixth most populous city after Gori.

Historic population of Zugdidi:

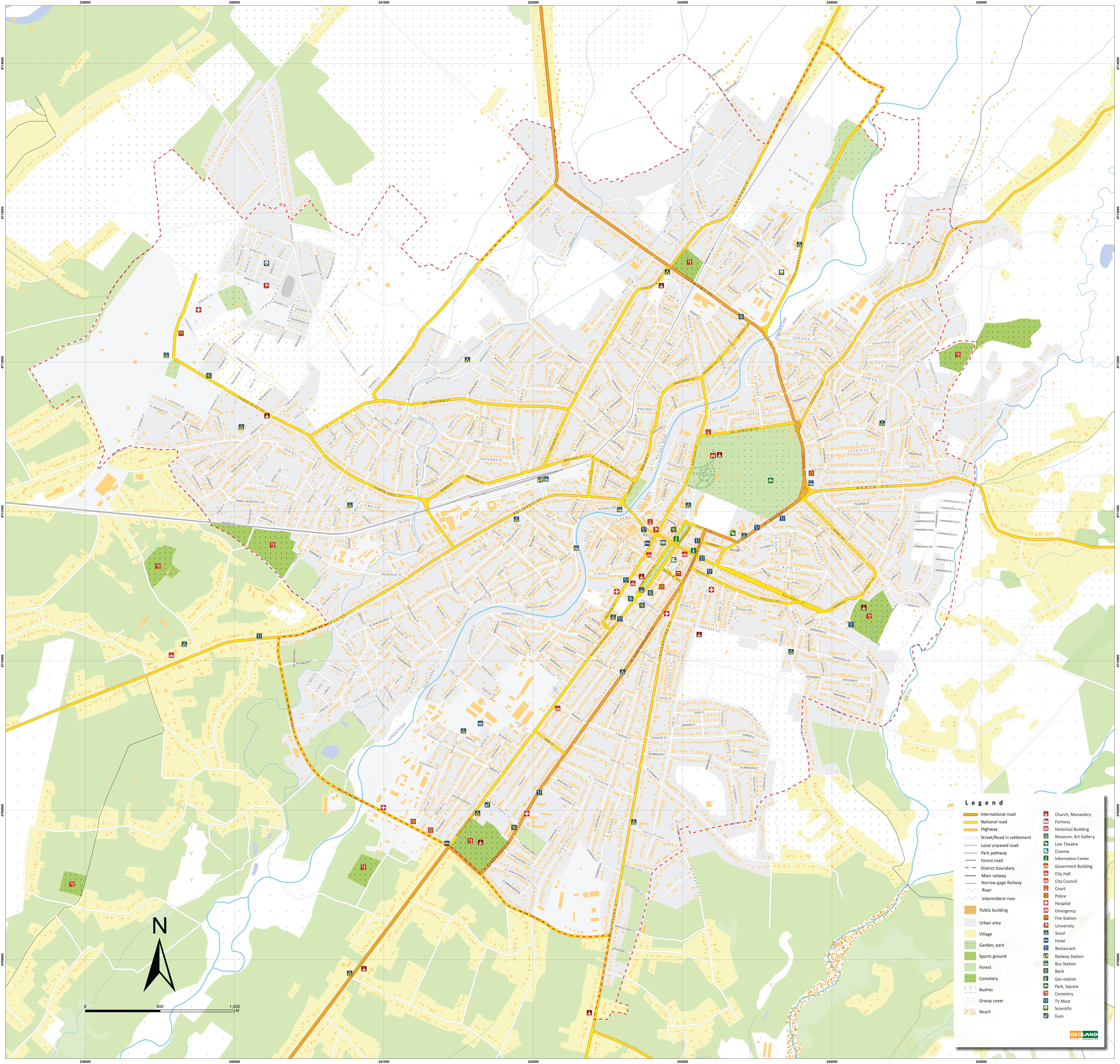
Zugdidi city map

Year	Total	Male	Female
1851	2,000	---	---
1863	800	---	---
1886	1,078	---	---
1897	3,407	2,129	1,278
1917	4,000	---	---
1922	4,525	---	---
1926	5,577	2,843	2,734
1939	15,062	7,394	7,668
1959	31,081	14,119	16,962
1970	39,896	18,610	21,286
1979	45,170	20,988	24,182
1989	50,022	23,551	26,471
2002	68,535	31,312	37,223
2014	42,998	19,746	23,252
2023	41,332	---	---

== Education ==
Zugdidi is a regional center of education. Institutes of higher education are:

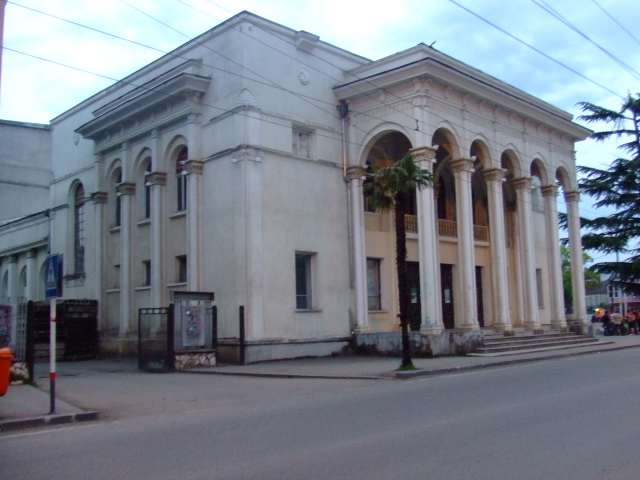
Shalva Dadiani Drama Theater

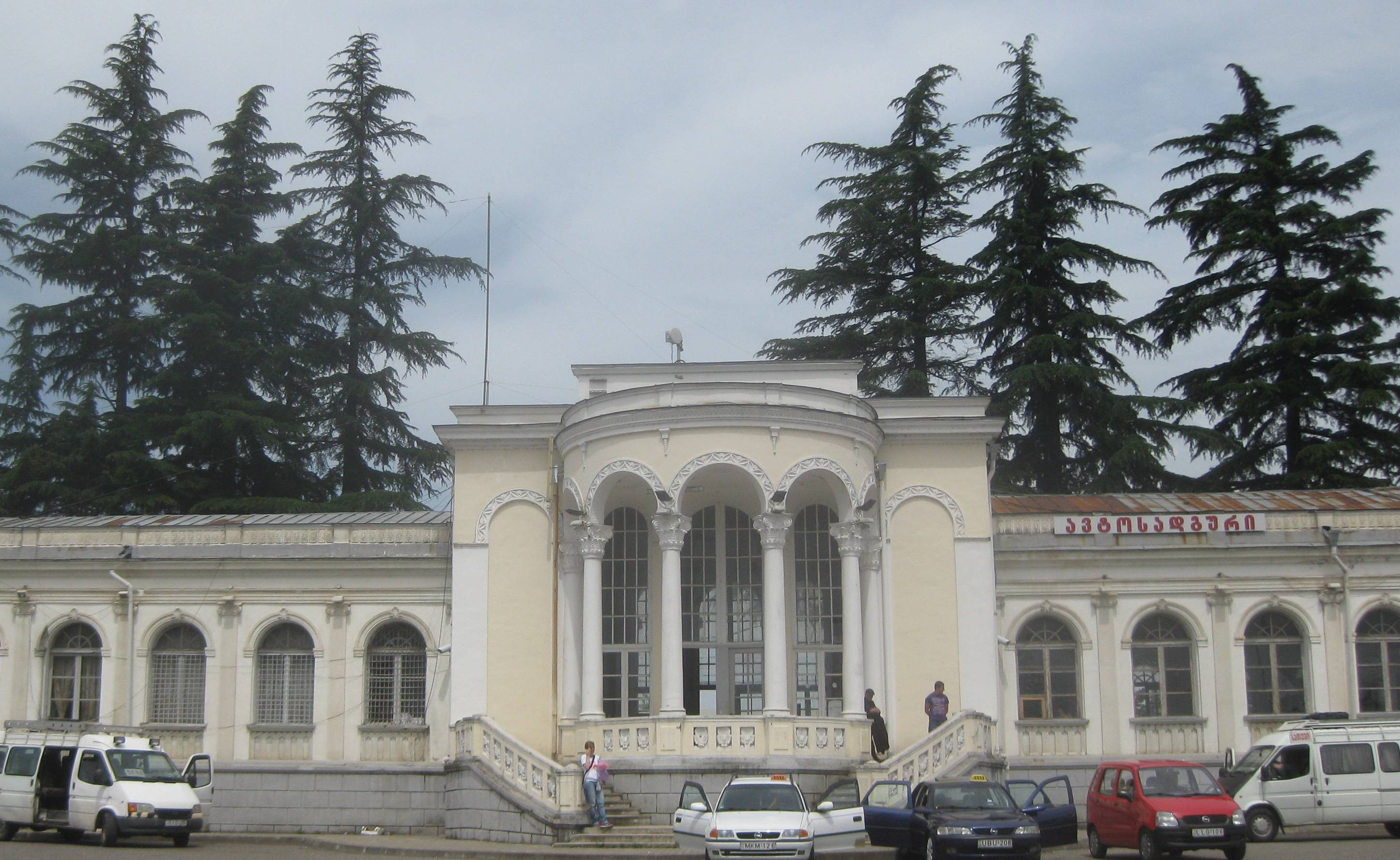
Zugdidi Railway Station

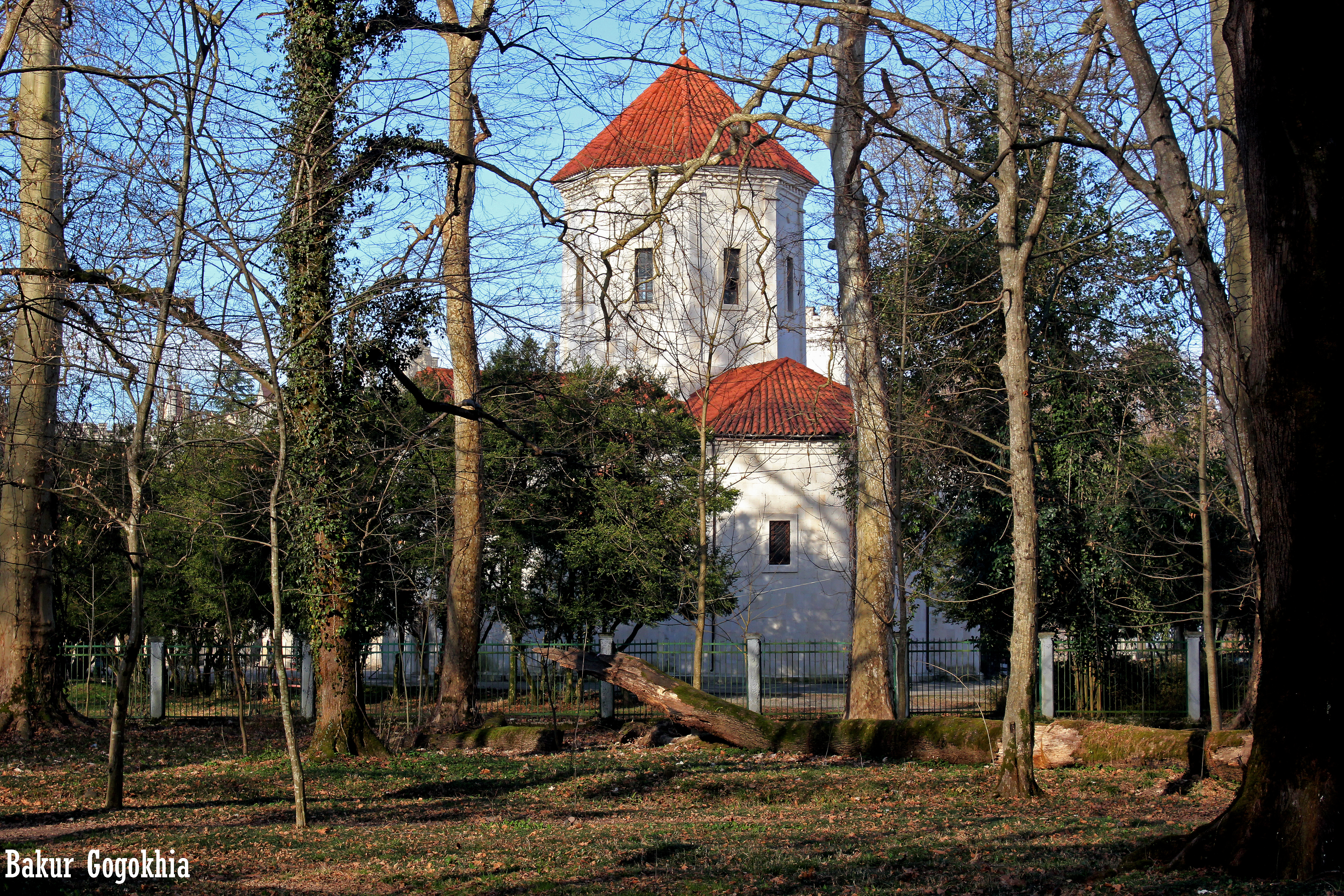
The Cathedral of the Blachernae Icon of the Mother of God

- Shota Meskhia State Teaching University – the main institution of higher education founded in 2007 on the basis of Zugdidi Branch of Ivane Javakhishvili Tbilisi State University, Zugdidi Professional Lyceum and Senaki Agro-economic College. The university has three faculties of Humanitarian, Business Administration and Law and Health.
- Zugdidi Teaching University European Academy, founded in 1991

Besides this Zugdidi has 13 public and 3 private schools, as well as kindergartens.

- Alexander Gurtskaya Gymnasium – GG – one more place of interest and unique educational space. Was founded in 2011, on the basis of a Presidential Decree instead of former Public School No.7. Today, GG is an innovative educational environment where each individual has a wide selection, capability and motivation of intellectual, physical and spiritual development and wonderful opportunities for achieving success in the global competitive society. The Gymnasium welcomes its students and guests with its unique, original facade, which is made of randomly spaced books on the shelves.

Library tradition in Zugdidi dates back to the reign of Prince (Mtavari) David Dadiani (1812–1853) of Mingrelia, who collected a large number of handwritten and printed books. The first public library in Zugdidi was established in 1887. After this, in 1899 new reading room was rearranged, which turned into a library in 1912 with its own building. Currently, the library is called Zugdidi City Municipal Library.

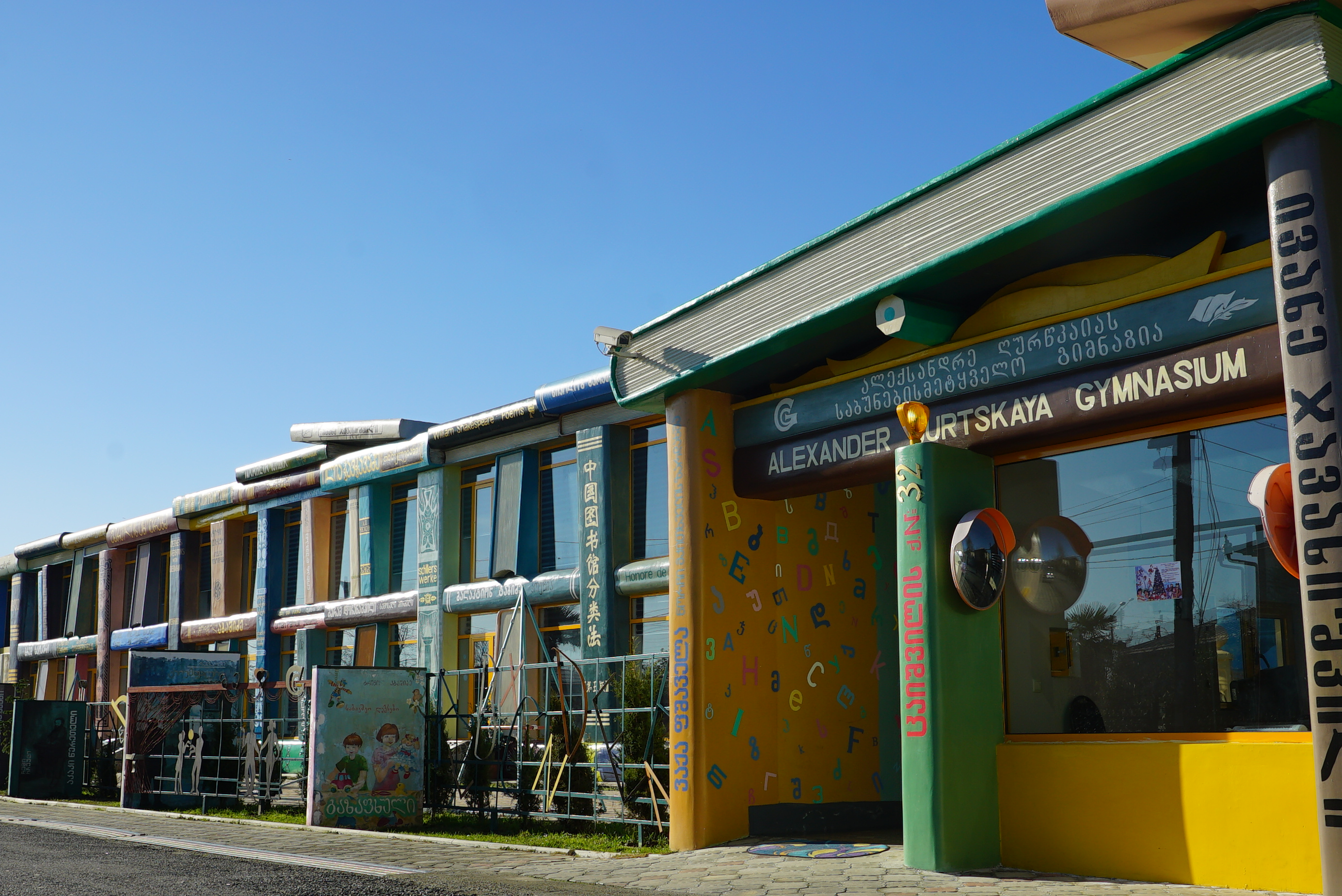
Zugdidi A. Gurtskaya Gymnasium

== Annual events ==
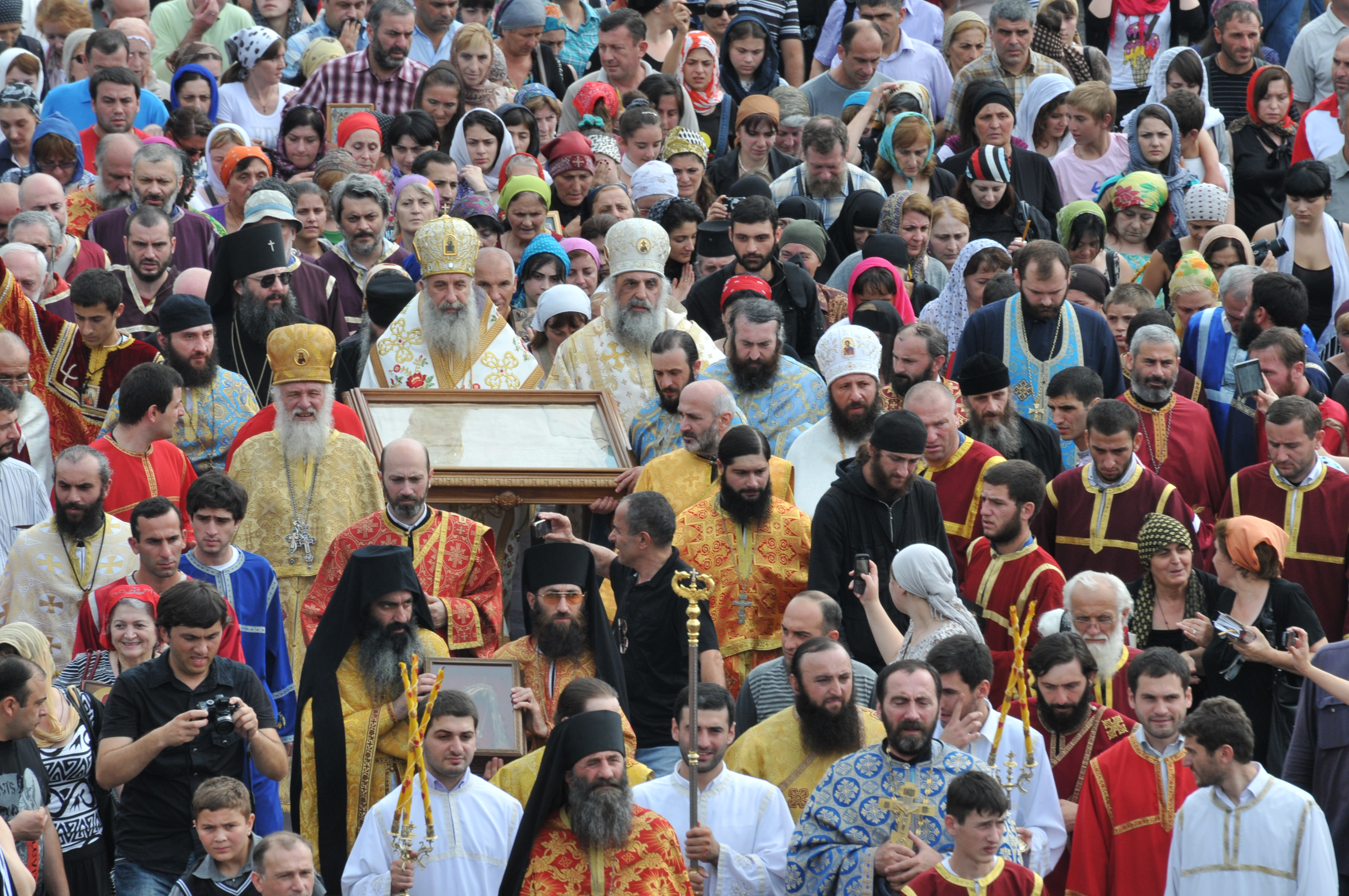
Vlakernoba in 2012

=== Vlakernoba ===
The main annual event in Zugdidi is Vlakernoba (Georgian: ვლაქერნობა - The day of the Blachernae's Virgin Mary) - an Orthodox Christian feast celebrated every year, on July 15. On this day, the robe of the Blessed Virgin Mary is taken from the Tower of Virgin of the Queen Palace (now a museum), where it is kept, to the Cathedral of the Blachernae Icon of the Mother of God. During the feast, thousands of the faithful from all over the world are able to venerate the holy relic upon the conclusion of the Divine Liturgy.

From 2012, during the event, the holy robe was carried into the new cathedral of Iberian Theotokos. Vlakernoba is celebrated since the 1990s.

=== Zugdidoba ===
Zugdidoba (Georgian: ზუგდიდობა - the day of Zugdidi) is a newly reestablished public festival, featuring various cultural, sport and educational events in Zugdidi, mostly in October. The festival is managed both by Zugdidi Municipal City Hall and Zugdidi Municipality Government.

== Sports ==
The main association football team in the city is FC Dinamo Zugdidi founded in 1919. Other, amateur, football clubs are FC Mglebi Zugdidi and FC Odishi 1919. American Football Club "Western Bad Boys"

== Notable people ==
- Niko I Dadiani (1847–1903), Prince of Mingrelia
- Salome Dadiani (1848–1913), Georgian princess
- Andria Dadiani (1850–1910), Georgian nobleman and a chess player
- Otar Patsatsia (1929–2021), 3rd Prime Minister of Georgia (1993–1995)
- Nona Gaprindashvili (1941–), chess player, the sixth women's world chess champion (1962–1978), first female Grandmaster
- Otar Gabelia (1953–), retired football player, goalkeeper of FC Dinamo Tbilisi and Soviet Union national football team
- Davit Narmania (1979–), former mayor of Tbilisi, the capital of Georgia
- Davit Kiria (1988–), Georgian kickboxer who competes in the Lightweight division
- Ika Meporia (1989–), professional footballer

== See also ==
- Zugdidi Municipality
- Dadiani Palaces History and Architectural Museum
- Zugdidi Botanical Garden
- Samegrelo-Zemo Svaneti
