= Andria Dadiani =

Georgian nobleman and chess player

Prince Andria Dadiani
- ანდრია დადიანი
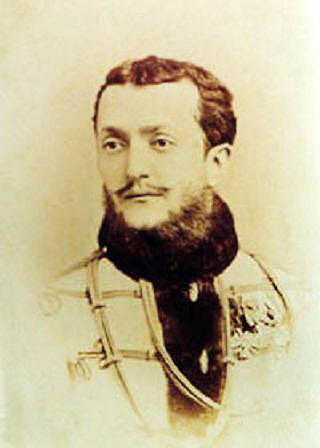
- Born: October 24, 1850
- Died: June 12, 1910 (aged 59)
- Occupation: Chess player

Prince Andria Dadiani (Georgian: ანდრია დადიანი; 1850–1910), known in Russia as Andrey Davidovich Dadian-Mingrelsky (Russian: Андрей Давидович Дадиани), was a Georgian nobleman and a chess player.

A member of a Mingrelian (Western Georgia) princely family, son of prince David Dadiani and his wife princess Ekaterine Chavchavadze, Andria Dadiani was born in Zugdidi, W. Georgia. He graduated from Heidelberg University Faculty of Law in 1873. Later, he served as a lieutenant-general of the Russian army.

Andrei Dadiani learned to play chess from his parents. In 1864 he met Thomas Wilson Barnes while vacationing in Homberg, Germany. Under Barnes's tutelage, Dadian won his first tournament at Homberg that year. In 1867 Dadian met Ignatz Kolisch who had just won the Paris tournament. He played Kolisch and won a few games.

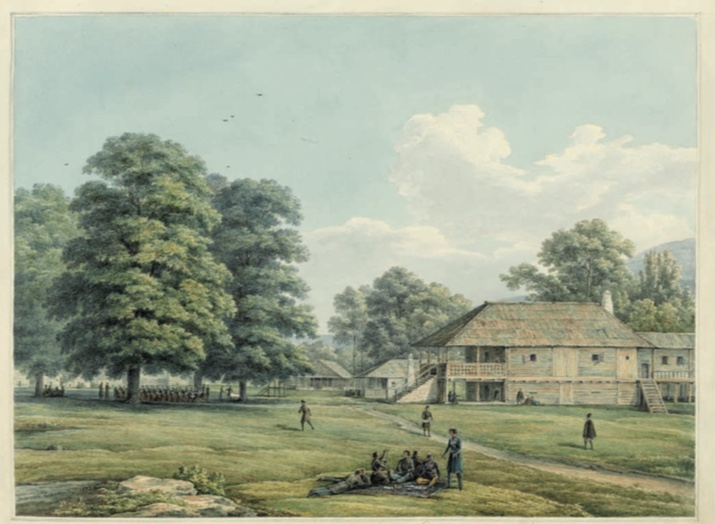
Nikanor Chernetsov, “House of Prince Dadian in Mingrelia”

Prince Andrei Dadiani was a chess player, sponsor and organizer. He sponsored and played in the first Kiev chess tournament of 1900, attaining second place behind Nikolaev and sponsored the 2nd (1902) and 3rd(1903) all-Russian tournaments in Kiev. He helped sponsor or organize the Belle Epoch chess tournaments at Monte Carlo in 1901, 1902 and 1903 and Barmen in 1905.

Due to his position, Dadiani participated in very few tournaments. Besides winning amateur tournament Homberg in 1864 and placing second in Kiev 1900, he came in first in St. Petersburg 1881–82. He is also said to have played in a tournament in Rome between 1867 and 1881, but this is unsubstantiated.

Many of his games were published by Numa Preti in "La Strategie" and by William Steinitz in his International Chess Magazine. British Chess Magazine dedicated its June–July 1892 issue to Dadiani.

In 1903, Mikhail Chigorin was invited to the Monte Carlo tournament. Dadiani, operating under the idea that Chigorin had insulted him on an earlier occasion, refused to sponsor the tournament if Chigorin remained. The committee honored Dadiani's wishes and excluded Chigorin. Dadiani did indemnify Chigorin for the inconvenience to the sum of 1500 francs, which was slightly more than the value of third prize.

After his death, some people accused Dadiani of having falsified or pre-arranged his brilliancies. Although none of these claims have even been substantiated, it is known that he remunerated Steinitz and Preti for publishing his games and was later accused by Fedor Duz-Chotimirski of sending in his own wins while covering up his opponents wins.. Thus, it is hard to establish how good a chess-player he really was.

Emmanuel Schiffers published a book of Prince Dadiani's end-games, Fins de Partie de S.A.S. le Prince Dadian de Mingrelie (Kiev, 1903) and Tengiz Giorgadze published "Ygraet A. Dadiani" ("Play Andrey Dadiani") in "Soviet Georgia" (Tbilisi, 1972).
