= David Dadiani =

Prince of Mingrelia

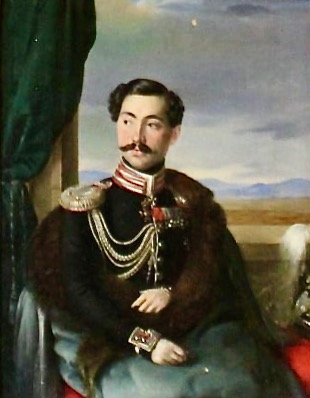
- David Dadiani.

Prince of Mingrelia
- Reign: 30 July 1846 – 30 August 1853
- Predecessor: Levan V Dadiani
- Successor: Niko I Dadiani
- Born: 23 January 1813; Chkaduashi, near Zugdidi
- Died: 30 August 1853 (aged 40)
- Burial: Martvili Monastery
- Spouse: Ekaterine Chavchavadze
- Issue Among others: Niko I Dadiani; Salome Dadiani; Andria Dadiani
- House: Dadiani
- Father: Levan V Dadiani
- Mother: Marta Tsereteli
- Religion: Georgian Orthodox Church

David Dadiani (Georgian: დავით დადიანი, romanized: davit dadiani; 23 January 1813 – 30 August 1853), of the House of Dadiani, was Prince of Mingrelia, in western Georgia, from 1846 until his death in 1853. A son of Levan V Dadiani, he became de facto ruler of Mingrelia on his father's retirement in 1840. Like his father, David ruled as an autonomous subject under the protection of the Russian Empire and concurrently held the position of a major-general of the Russian army. David presided over the frequently heavy-handed efforts to modernize Mingrelia's government, economy, and education. The Russian authorities, citing the Mingrelians' discontent with Dadiani's harsh measures, attempted, but failed to bribe him into resigning his office. David died of malaria at the age of 40.

== Early life and career ==
David Dadiani was born in the village of Chkaduashi near Zugdidi, Mingrelia's capital into the family of the prince-regnant Levan V Dadiani and his wife, Princess Marta Tsereteli. As an adolescent, David was sent to Tiflis to be educated under the guidance of the Russian generals Vasili Bebutov and Georg Andreas von Rosen. He was commissioned as a cornet in the Life Guards Cossack regiment in 1829. From 1834 to 1838, he was in his native Mingrelia at his father's request to help reform the principality's crumbling government and economy. However, the young reformer's efforts were not popular with the local nobility and even his father. The disillusioned prince David returned to Tiflis and resumed his service with the Russian military, being promoted to the rank of colonel. Eventually, on 11 May 1840, Levan V resigned the government of Mingrelia in favor of his son; he remained a titular prince-regnant, while David became a co-prince and de facto ruler of the principality. On Levan's death in 1846, David succeeded to all his titles.

== Reforms in Mingrelia ==
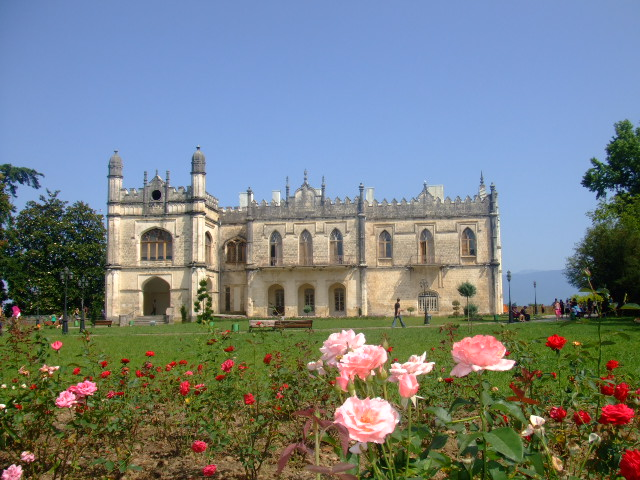
The Dadiani Palace in Zugdidi.

Once in government, David embarked on a series of reforms to modernize his principality's administration and economy. He substituted hereditary governors of Mingrelia's districts with appointed officials, removed the court from the high nobility's control and appointed 12 independent lawyers as the final arbiters of justice. He, further, emancipated the lower strata of the clergy from serfdom and, at the same time, placed Mingrelia's chief prelate, the archbishop of Chqondidi, under his authority.

Dadiani also abolished the institution of dowry, improved civil infrastructure, and instituted annual scholarships for around 10 Mingrelians for professional education in Tiflis. He helped found several enterprises, such as a silk factory in Zugdidi and alcohol beverage distilleries in Zugdidi and Salkhino. At his palace in Zugdidi, Dadiani founded a museum of Georgian antiquities and a library of old Georgian manuscripts, subsequently bequeathed by his son Niko to the Society for the Spreading of Literacy among Georgians.

Dadiani's reforms were frequently executed in a heavy-handed manner, causing discontent among his subjects. Critics accused him of despotism and self-enrichment. Mikhail Vorontsov, viceroy of the Caucasus, reacted to this by offering Dadiani to step down in exchange of monetary compensation. David demanded 30,000 chervonets and that all his estates be left in his possession. Vorontsov threatened with the abolition of Mingrelia's autonomy and Dadiani promised to accommodate Russian interests in his principality.

== Relations with Russia ==
In general, David Dadiani was a loyal subject of the Russian crown throughout his rule. At the head of Mingrelian forces, he fought the anti-Russian rebels in neighboring Guria in 1841 and the Circassian tribes on the northwest Caucasian coastline later that year. In 1845, he was promoted to the rank of major-general. Dadiani was in dispute with his cousins, the Shervashidze family, in Abkhazia over the borderland fiefdom of Samurzakano. In 1847, the Russian government removed Samurzakano from Mingrelia's control and put it under the Kutais Governorate, paying Dadiani off with 25,000 roubles.

== Family ==
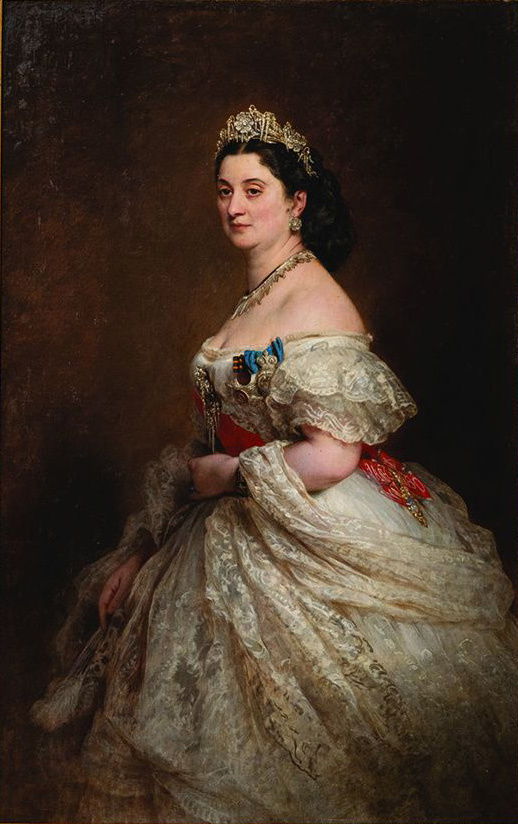
Ekaterine Chavchavadze, David Dadiani's wife.

David, while still a child, had been betrothed to Darejan, daughter of the Svan prince Tsiok Dadeshkeliani, but, in 1835, David repudiated her and arranged Darejan's marriage to the Kakhetian Prince David Abkhazi, granting her former fiancée a pension of 150 chervonets. In 1839, David married Princess Ekaterine Chavchavadze, a daughter of the poet and general Alexander Chavchavadze. The wedding was celebrated at the Kashveti Church in Tiflis on 15 May 1839.

David and Ekaterine were the parents of seven children. Of these, Maria (1840–1842), Nina (1841–1848), and Levan (1842–1844) died in David's lifetime. He was survived by four children:

- Niko (1847–1903), Major-General, the last Prince of Mingrelia;
- Salome (1848–1913), a socialite married to the French prince Achille Murat (1847–1895);
- Andria (1850–1910), Lieutenant-General, an avid chess-player;
- Tamar (1853–1859), died young

== Death ==
David Dadiani died of malaria at the age of 40 at his palace in the village of Gordi. He was buried at the Martvili Monastery. According to the Russian military physician Erast Andreyevsky, there were rumors that Dadiani was poisoned by the people disaffected by his rule. He was succeeded by his six-year-old son, Niko, whose regency was assumed by David's widow Ekaterine Chavchavadze.

David Dadiani House of Dadiani Born: 23 January 1813 Died: 30 August 1853
Regnal titles
Preceded by Levan V Dadiani	Prince of Mingrelia; 1846–1853	Succeeded by Niko I Dadiani
