= Ekaterine Chavchavadze =

Ekateriné Dadiani-Chavchavadze
- Princess of Mingrelia
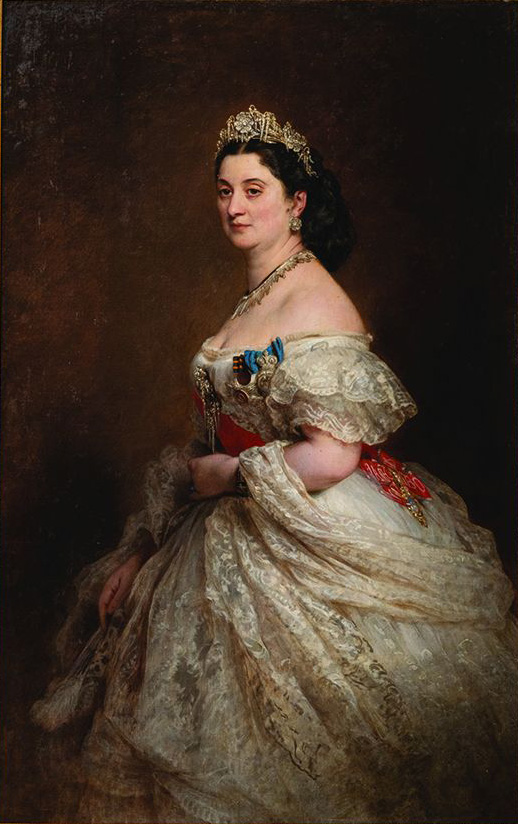
- Portrait by Franz Xaver Winterhalter
- Born: March 19, 1816; Tsinandali
- Died: August 25, 1882 (aged 66)
- Spouse: David Dadiani, Prince of Mingrelia
- Issue: Prince Niko; Princess Salomé; Prince Andria
Names
- Ekateriné Alexandres asuli Dadiani-Chavchavadze
- House: Chavchavadze
- Father: Prince Alexander Chavchavadze
- Mother: Princess Salomé Orbeliani

Ekateriné Dadiani, Princess of Mingrelia (Georgian: ეკატერინე დადიანი; née Chavchavadze; March 19, 1816 – August 13, 1882) of the House of Dadiani, was a 19th-century Georgian aristocrat and the last ruling princess (as regent) of the Principality of Mingrelia in Western Georgia. She was regent during the minority of her son between 1853 and 1857. She played an important role in resisting Ottoman influence in her principality and was at the center of Georgian high society, both inside the country and abroad.

== Family and marriage ==
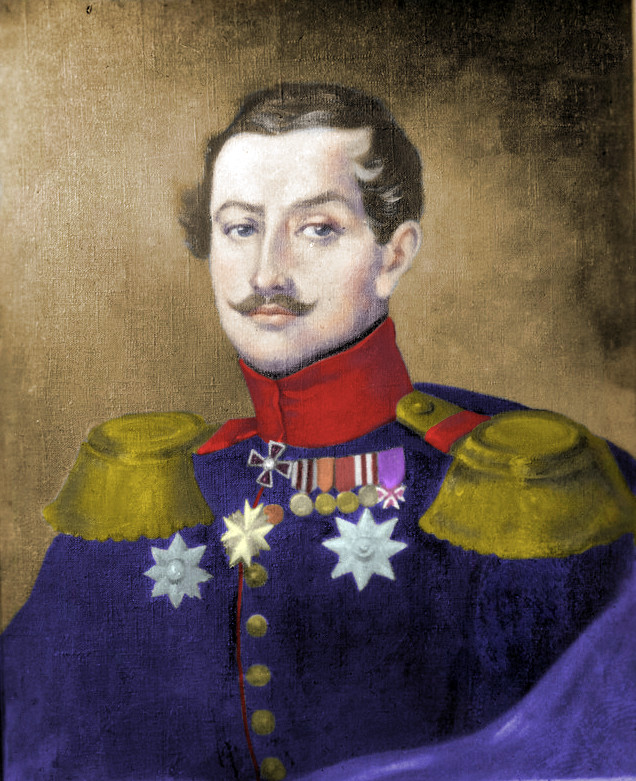
Ekateriné's father, Prince Alexander Chavchavadze

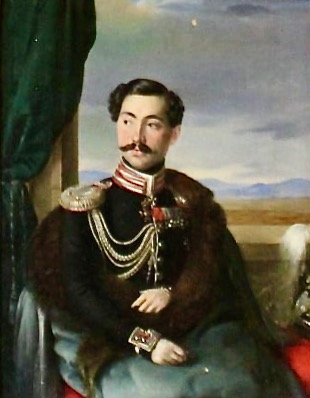
Her spouse, David Dadiani, Prince of Mingrelia

Ekateriné was born to the distinguished House of Chavchavadze from Eastern Georgia. Her father was Prince Alexander Chavchavadze, a noted Georgian general and godson of Catherine the Great of Russia. Her mother was Princess Salomé Orbeliani (1795-1847), a great-granddaughter of Erekle II (Heraclius II) of Eastern Georgia. Her elder sister Princess Nino married the famous Russian playwright, composer and diplomat Aleksandr Griboyedov, while her younger sister Princess Sophie was married to Count Alexandr Nikolai, the minister of education of Imperial Russia.

On December 19, 1838, Ekateriné married the Hereditary Prince of Mingrelia, David Dadiani. In 1840, he became ruler of the principality upon the retirement of his father, Levan V Dadiani.

In August 1853, David died and Ekateriné quickly assumed the responsibilities of her late husband, rising from relative obscurity. Recognizing her as regent of Mingrelia on behalf of her elder son, Prince Niko, Nicholas I of Russia assigned her a regency council which included her late husband's brothers, Prince Grigol Dadiani and Prince Konstantin Dadiani.

== Instability during the Crimean War ==
During the Crimean War, the Turks sent a considerable force to Mingrelia, occupying significant parts of the principality and forcing Ekateriné to flee for security reasons. She soon received a threatening letter from the commanding Turkish general Omar Pasha demanding her surrender, as well as the transfer of her son's principality to the Ottoman Empire. Refusing to dignify Pasha's letter with a response, Ekateriné assumed control of the Mingrelian forces and organized successful counter-attacks that inflicted serious damage on the invading Turks.

The Crimean War soon ended in 1856 with the Treaty of Paris and Ekateriné was reinstated as regent, receiving an invitation to the coronation of Emperor Alexander II of Russia. She attended the ceremony with her children, as well as her sister, Nino. According to the Russian memoirist K.A. Borozdin, Ekateriné retained "the luster of her beauty" and looked extraordinary in her "original and richly decorated costume." The memoirist, like many others in modern-day Georgia, refers to her as the "Mingrelian Queen" and states that at the coronation ball, everyone was "delighted with [Ekateriné], her sister, children, and entourage."

== Mingrelian rebellion and Russian encroachment ==
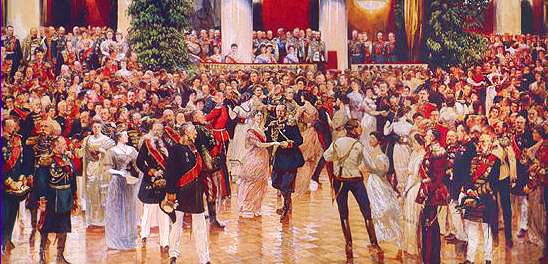
Ekateriné at the coronation ball in the Winter Palace

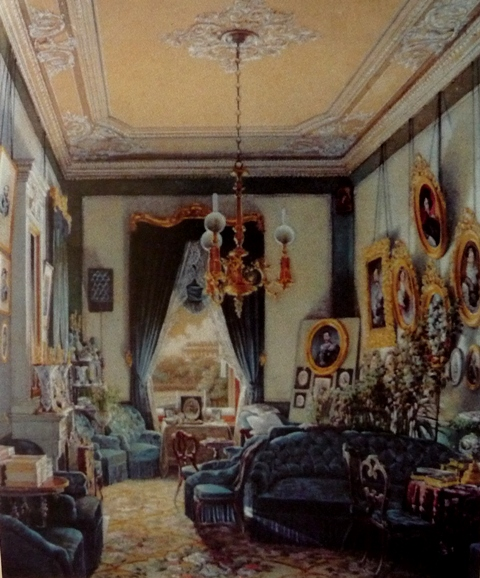
Princess Ekateriné's salon in Tsarskoe Selo

In 1856, Ekateriné left the Mingrelian principality to her brother-in-law, General Grigol Dadiani and moved to live in Tsarskoe Selo, the residence of the Russian Imperial Family, where she became one of the "ladies of the court." In 1857, she was forced to return to Georgia because of the peasant uprising organized by a Mingrelian smith, Uta Miqava. On May 12, the rebels took control of the province's capital Zugdidi, forcing Ekateriné to request help from Russia. Having already effectively annexed Eastern Georgia, Russia eagerly intervened, subdued the uprising, and asked Ekateriné to move to Saint Petersburg on the pretext of facilitating her children's education and upbringing there. Her departure and the establishment of a "temporary" Russian military authority in Mingrelia marked the de facto abolition of the principality.

== Final years ==
After moving to Russia, Ekateriné kept her private salon in Tsarskoe Selo open to the Georgian and Russian intelligentsia. After living there for nearly ten years, she moved to Paris, where her daughter Princess Salomé already lived with her French husband, Prince Achille Murat. In the final years of her life, Ekateriné moved back to Western part of Georgia, then officially part of the Russian Empire, and lived there to the end. She was interred in the medieval Eastern Orthodox monastery of Martvili.

== Issue ==
Image	Name	Birth	Death
	Princess Maria	1840	1842
	Princess Nina	1841	1848
	Prince Levan	1842	1844
	Prince Niko	4 January 1847	22 January 1903
	Princess Salomé	12 January 1848	27 July 1913
	Prince Andria	1850	1910
	Princess Tamara	1853	1859
