= Niko I Dadiani =

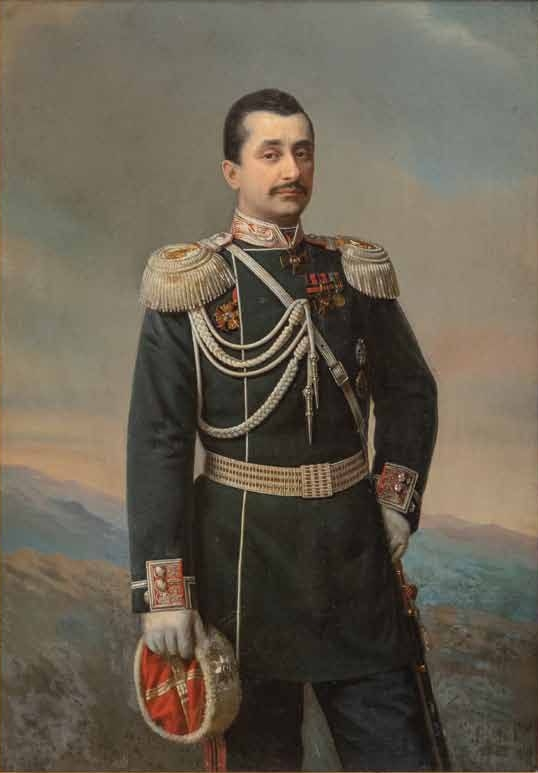
- Late 19th-century portrait of Niko Dadiani

Prince of Mingrelia
- Tenure: 30 August 1853 – 4 January 1867
- Predecessor: David Dadiani
- Successor: Principality abolished
- Born: 4 January 1847; Zugdidi
- Died: 23 January 1903 (aged 56); Saint Petersburg
- Burial: Martvili
- Spouse: Countess Maria Alexandrovna Adlerberg
- Issue: Princess Ekaterina; Prince Nikolay; Princess Salomea
- House: Dadiani
- Father: David Dadiani
- Mother: Ekaterine Chavchavadze
- Religion: Georgian Orthodox Church

Nikoloz "Niko" Dadiani (Georgian: ნიკოლოზ "ნიკო" დადიანი), or Nikolay Davidovich Dadian-Mingrelsky (Russian: Николай Давидович Дадиан-Мингрельский; 4 January 1847 – 23 January 1903), was the last Prince of Mingrelia from 1853 to 1867. Of the House of Dadiani, one of the leading Georgian noble families, he succeeded on the death of his father, David Dadiani, but he never ruled in his own right; during his minority, the government was run by regency presided by his mother, Princess Ekaterina, and in 1857, Mingrelia was placed under a provisional Russian administration. In 1867, Dadiani formally abdicated the throne and Mingrelia was directly incorporated into the Russian Empire. Dadiani mostly lived in Saint Petersburg, being close to the court. He was an officer in the Imperial Russian Army, distinguished himself in the Russo-Turkish War (1877–1878), and retired with the rank of major-general.

== Early life ==
Niko Dadiani was born in Zugdidi, Mingrelia's capital, in 1847. Niko was six years old in August 1853 when his father died, and he became Prince of Mingrelia as an autonomous subject of the Russian Empire. With the approval of Tsar Nicholas I, Niko was placed under the regency of his mother, Princess Ekaterina; the Russian bureaucrat Kornely Borozdin was assigned to him as a tutor. The regency council also included Niko's paternal uncles, Grigol and Konstantin.

The Dadiani family's luxurious life in Zugdidi was interrupted by the Crimean War, during the course of which, in 1854, the Ottoman troops advanced into Mingrelia. The Russian forces temporarily withdrew from the principality; Princess Ekaterina and Prince Niko took refuge in the mountains of Lechkhumi, at the monastery of Tsageri. After the war, in 1856, the mother and the son repaired to Moscow to attend the coronation of Tsar Alexander II and then followed the imperial family to St. Petersburg. On this occasion, Niko—enlisted at his birth as a cornet in the Life Guards Cossack regiment—was made aide-de-camp to the Tsar and commissioned as a poruchik in the Life Guards Caucasian Squadron of His Imperial Majesty's Personal Escort.

== End of the principality ==
Niko remained in St. Petersburg, enjoying the favor of the imperial family even after his mother hurried home due to a peasant revolt in Mingrelia in May 1857. The revolt was exploited by the Russian government as a pretext to recall Princess Ekaterina back to St. Petersburg and to place the hitherto autonomous principality under a provisional Russian administration.

Niko Dadiani was then sent for further education in Paris. On his return, Niko, persuaded to accept a fait accompli, renounced his hereditary title of Prince Regnant of Mingrelia on 4 January 1867. With this, Mingrelia was formally annexed directly into the Russian Empire; Dadiani retained his palaces in Zugdidi and Gordi as his personal property. On his abdication, Niko was recompensed with the title of prince (knyaz), one million roubles, and a major's commission. His mother, brother, and sister were granted a lifetime pension. On 34 August 1874, he received the style and surname of Prince Dadian-Mingrelsky ("Dadiani of Mingrelia").

== Army service ==
In 1875, Prince Dadian-Mingrelsky was transferred to the Chevalier Guard Regiment and saw action as part of the detachment of General Iosif Gurko in Bulgaria during the 1877–1878 war with the Ottoman Empire. He was present at storming Tarnovo, Kazanlak, and Shipka Pass in 1877. For his conduct, Dadiani was awarded the Order of St. Vladimir, 4th Class, with band and a gold sword with the inscription "for courage". He was promoted to colonel on 30 August 1877. After the war, he withdrew to reserves with the promotion to major-general in August 1878 and finally retired from service with a privilege of wearing a uniform in October 1878.

== Later years ==
On the death of Princess Ekaterina in 1882, Niko Dadiani inherited her estates in Mingrelia and became the richest landowner in the Caucasus. He took an interest in the cultural enterprises of his contemporary Georgian intellectuals. In 1885, Dadiani donated his father's rich personal library collection, including old Georgian manuscripts, to the charity Society for the Spreading of Literacy among Georgians (now in possession of the National Parliamentary Library of Georgia). He helped open schools and hospitals to serve the poor in Mingrelia, and supported efforts to promote the Georgian language.

In 1887, Dadiani was nominated by Tsar Alexander III as a candidate for the vacant princely throne of Bulgaria after Alexander of Battenberg had been forced to abdicate in September 1886. The Russian nominee was rejected by the Grand Assembly of Bulgaria, and the crown eventually went to the German prince Ferdinand of Saxe-Coburg and Gotha in July 1887.

Niko Dadiani died in St. Petersburg in 1903. He was buried at the Dadiani burial ground at the Martvili Monastery.

== Family ==
Niko Dadiani married, in St. Petersburg, on 14 April 1874, Countess Maria Alexandrovna von Adlerberg (29 May 1849 – 27 February 1926), daughter of Count Aleksandr von Adlerberg, who was Minister of the Imperial Court, and Ekaterina Adlerberg. They had three children:

- Princess Ekaterina (27 March 1875 – 10 December 1875);
- Prince Nikolay (30 December 1876 – March 1919), Gentleman of the Imperial Bedchamber; he died in a Bolshevik prison hospital at St. Petersburg without issue; His body was released to his fiancée, Princess Elena Eristavi, who buried him in the garden of a Georgian church in Russia.
- Princess Salomea (1 December 1878 – 3 December 1961), Lady-in-waiting of the Imperial Court of Russia; she was married to Major-General Prince Aleksandr Nikolayevich Obolensky (1872–1924) and died as an emigrée at Asnières-sur-Seine, France.

Niko Dadiani also had an extramarital daughter, Menik (1880–1954), with his distant relative Princess Kesaria Chikovani. She married Prince Andria Davidovich Gelovani (1872–1924) and had issue.

Niko I Dadiani House of Dadiani Born: 4 January 1847 Died: 23 January 1903
Regnal titles
Preceded by David Dadiani	Prince of Mingrelia; 1853–1867	Succeeded by Abdicated; principality abolished
