= Mingrelia =

Mingrelia სამეგრელო
- Historical region
- Flag Coat of arms

- Coordinates: 42°34′30″N 41°40′40″E
- Country: Georgia
- Largest city: Zugdidi

Area^{2}
  - Total: 9,983 km^{2} (3,854 sq mi)

Population (2011)
  - Total: 522,019
  - Density: 52.29/km^{2} (135.4/sq mi)
- Demonym: Mingrelian
- Mingrelia is not an official subdivision of the Georgia; it constitutes a historical region only.

Mingrelia or Samegrelo (Georgian: სამეგრელო, romanized: samegrelo [ˈs̪äme̞gɾe̞ɫo̞]; Mingrelian: სამარგალო, romanized: samargalo) is a historic province in the western part of Georgia, formerly known as Odishi. It is primarily inhabited by the Mingrelians, a subgroup of Georgians.

== Geography and climate ==
Mingrelia is bordered by the secessionist region of Abkhazia to the north-west, Svaneti to the north, Imereti to the east, Guria to the south and the Black Sea to the west.

Administratively, the historic province of Mingrelia is incorporated joined with the northern part of the neighboring mountainous province of Svaneti to form the Samegrelo-Zemo Svaneti region, the capital of which is Mingrelia's main city, Zugdidi.

As it is the case with most Black Sea coastal areas of Georgia, Mingrelia's climate is subtropical with frequent rains. The coastal areas have many marshlands despite the Soviet Georgian authorities' efforts to dry them up. These marshlands contain many rare birds and animals not found in other parts of the country. For this reason, substantial part of the territories is protected by the Georgian law as part of the Colchetian Nature Reserve.

== History ==
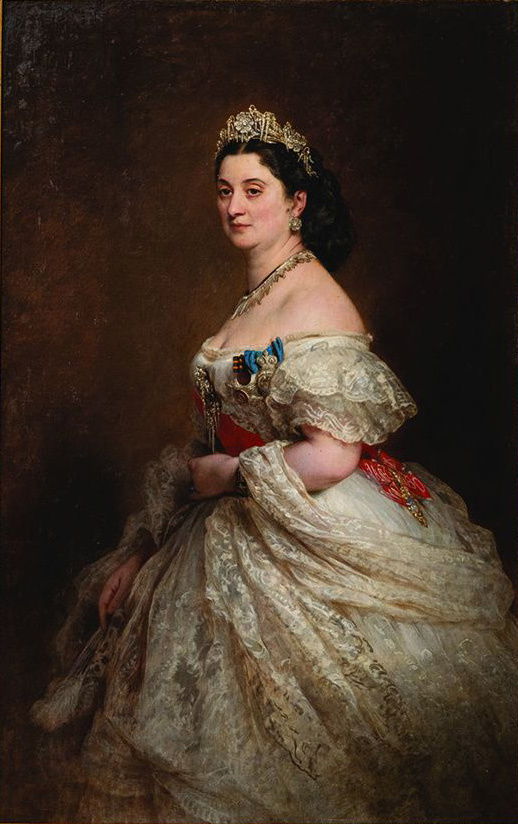
Princess Ekaterine, the last female ruler of Mingrelia, referred to by locals as the "Queen of Mingrelia".

In ancient times Mingrelia was a major part of the kingdom of Colchis (13th-6th centuries BC) and its successor Egrisi (4th century BC-6th century AD). In the 11th-15th centuries, Mingrelia was a part of the united Kingdom of Georgia. From the 16th century to 1857, the independent Kingdom of Mingrelia was under the rule of the House of Dadiani. Between 1568 and 1803, it was vassal of Ottoman Empire.

In December 1803, the kingdom came under the patronage of the Russian Empire by an agreement between the Tsar and the Megrelian Prince Grigol Dadiani. The last adult Prince, David Dadiani, died in 1853, leaving his wife Ekaterine as regent for his young son, Niko. However, in 1867, the principality was abolished and absorbed into the Tsarist Russian Empire. Prince Niko Dadiani officially renounced his rights to the throne in 1868.

Plant specimens of Astrantia colchica were found on Mt. Kwira in Mingrelia in 1894 by the Russian botanist Nikolai Albov.

From 1918 to 1921, Mingrelia was part of the Democratic Republic of Georgia (DRG). In 1921, Georgia was Sovietized and later became part of the Soviet Union, as the Georgian SSR. On 9 April 1991, independence was restored to Georgia, of which Mingrelia is now part.

The first President of the post-Soviet Georgia, Zviad Gamsakhurdia, was a Megrelian. After the violent coup d'état of 21 December 1991 – 6 January 1992, Mingrelia became the centre of a civil war, which ended with the defeat of Gamsakhurdia's Megrelian supporters. Even so, this region was unmanageable by the central government throughout the presidency of Eduard Shevardnadze (1992–2003). The fact that the Georgian refugees from the Abkhazian war zone (who are considered by Georgians as victims of ethnic cleansing) are mostly Mingrelians has contributed to the region's instability. In 2004, following the Rose Revolution of November 2003, newly elected Georgian President, Mikheil Saakashvili, who vowed to resolve the conflict with the breakaway region of Abkhazia, disarmed groups of Megrelians who tried to fight a guerrilla war against the Abkhazians by incursions from Mingrelia.

== See also ==
- Mingrelian Affair
- Principality of Mingrelia
- List of Georgian princes (mtavars)
