= General Dadiani =

General Dadiani may refer to:

- Andria Dadiani (1850–1910), Imperial Russian Army lieutenant general
- David Dadiani (1813–1853), Imperial Russian Army major general
- Didi-Niko Dadiani (1764–1834), Imperial Russian Army major general
- Grigol Dadiani (Kolkhideli) (1814–1901), Imperial Russian Army general of the infantry
- Konstantin Dadiani (1819–1889), Imperial Russian Army lieutenant general
- Levan V Dadiani (1793–1846), Imperial Russian Army lieutenant general
- Niko I Dadiani (1847–1903), Imperial Russian Army major general
