= Manuchar II Dadiani =

Prince of the historical state of Mingrelia in the Caucasus

Manuchar II Dadiani (Georgian: მანუჩარ II დადიანი; died c. 1840), of the House of Dadiani, was Prince of Mingrelia from 1791 to 1793 as a rival to his elder brother, Grigol Dadiani, whose rule was marred by the long-standing struggle between the Imeretian crown seeking to subdue Mingrelia and Mingrelian efforts to win full independence, a continuation of the conflict which had plagued western Georgia for centuries. After the brothers reconciled in 1799, Manuchar was appanaged with Salipartiano, which he lost to his nephew Levan, a new Prince of Mingrelia, in the wake of Grigol's death in 1804.

== Power struggle ==
Manuchar was a son of Katsia II Dadiani by his third wife, Princess Anna Tsulukidze. In 1791, King Solomon II of Imereti, who sought to unite all of western Georgia under his authority, deposed Grigol and replaced him by a more amenable Manuchar. In 1792, Grigol's attempt at comeback were dashed as his newfound ally David II, claimant to the Imeretian crown, was defeated by Solomon and Manuchar near Kutaisi and Grigol's Abkhaz reinforcements deserted. Grigol later found support in the district of Lechkhumi and successfully resisted Solomon and Manuchar in his stronghold at Nogi. Manuchar was eventually ousted from Mingrelia and fled to Abkhazia in 1794, but Grigol was able to buy the Abkhaz ruler Kelesh Bey's loyalty by granting him the fort of Anaklia. There was another claimant in Mingrelia during these years: Tariel, younger brother of Grigol and Manuchar.

== Lord of Salipartiano ==
The Dadiani brothers reconciled in 1799. Grigol was recognized as Prince of Mingrelia, while Manuchar received the fief of Salipartiano. In a renewed conflict between Imereti and Mingrelia in 1802, Solomon again attempted to enlist Manuchar, but the latter eventually stood by his brother's side. Grigol died in October 1804, a few months after he placed his principality under Russian suzerainty. His young son and successor Levan was placed under regency of the princess dowager Nino. Manuchar saw this as an opportunity to advance his claims to the Mingrelian throne and petitioned the Russian authorities to confirm him as the next ruler of Mingrelia or, at least, to leave Salipartiano in his possession. The Russians turned down Manuchar's request as well as his mother's intercession; in 1805, Salipartiano became a Mingrelian crown land and Manuchar was relegated to his reduced estates.

Princess-regent Nino failed to fulfill her promise to compensate her brother-in-law for his losses and an attempt by the Russian governor-general Alexander Tormasov to help defuse tensions among the Dadiani failed. Manuchar and his brother Tariel rose in open rebellion against the Mingrelian regency in January 1810. Manuchar fled to the Imeretian king Solomon, who, at that time, was on the verge of war with the Russians. After Solomon's defeat by the Russian army, Manuchar stayed in Mingrelia and did not overtly join the king in a renewed uprising against the Russian encroachment in June 1810, but he was suspected of harboring anti-Russian sentiments. After Nino was sidelined from the government of Mingrelia in 1811, Manuchar played no active role in politics.

== Family ==
Manuchar was married firstly to Princess Darejan Shervashidze, daughter of Zurab Shervashidze, Prince of Abkhazia and secondly to Princess Anna Chijavadze. He had seven children, whose descendants are still extant:

- Katsia (born 1795); married 1) unknown 2) Princess Khwaramzi Chkheidze
- Elisabeth (b. 1798): married Prince Grigol Zurabi Tsereteli (1787-1843)
- Zurab; married Princess Elisabeth Tsulukidze
- Levan (born 1807): married 1) unknown 2) Princess from the House of Chichua 3) Princess Natalia Abashidze (b. 1832)
- Ekaterine (born 1814); married Prince Aleksandri Khitu Pagava (b. 1804)
- Martha
- Giorgi (died c. 1864); married Princess Kesaria Pagava (b. 1825)
- Aleksandre (died 1856); married Princess Rodam Mikeladze (1820-1856). They were parents of Prince Tariel "Taia" Dadiani (b. 1842), first husband of Agrippina Japaridze
- Dutu (born 1820); married Princess Mariam Dadeshkeliani

Manuchar II Dadiani House of Dadiani Born: ? Died: c. 1840
Regnal titles
| Preceded by Grigol Dadiani | Prince of Mingrelia; 1791–1793 | Succeeded by Tariel Dadiani |
