= Grigol Dadiani =

Prince of Mingrelia

Prince of Mingrelia
- 1st reign: 1788–1791
- Predecessor: Katsia II Dadiani
- Successor: Manuchar II Dadiani
- 2nd reign: 1794–1802
- Predecessor: Manuchar II Dadiani
- Successor: Tariel Dadiani
- 3nd reign: 1802–1804
- Predecessor: Tariel Dadiani
- Successor: Levan V Dadiani
- Born: 1770
- Died: 23 October 1804 (aged 33–34)
- Burial: Martvili Monastery
- Spouse: Nino Bagrationi
- Issue Among others: Levan V Dadiani
- House: Dadiani
- Father: Katsia II Dadiani
- Mother: Anna Tsulukidze
- Religion: Georgian Orthodox Church (Catholicate of Abkhazia)

Grigol Dadiani (Georgian: გრიგოლ დადიანი; 1770 – 23 October 1804), of the House of Dadiani, was Prince of Mingrelia from 1788 to 1804, with intermissions from 1791 to 1794 and in 1802 when his position was filled by his rivaling brothers. His rule was marred by the long-standing struggle between the Imeretian crown seeking to subdue Mingrelia and Mingrelian efforts to win full independence, a continuation of the conflict which had plagued western Georgia for centuries. Grigol's rapprochement with the expanding Russian Empire resulted in Mingrelia becoming, in 1804, a Russian subject with a degree of internal autonomy under the Dadiani dynasty, an arrangement which remained in place until 1856.

== Early rule ==
Grigol was the eldest son of Katsia II Dadiani by his third wife Anna Tsulukidze. In 1788, Grigol, then 18-year-old, succeeded on the death of his father as prince-regnant of Mingrelia. King David II of Imereti made use of his youth to advance his claims to Mingrelia and, notwithstanding important services rendered by Katsia II Dadiani, invaded the principality. Grigol took to Lechkhumi, a highland district disputed between Imereti and Mingrelia, whose loyalty then lay with Dadiani. King Heraclius II of Kartli-Kakheti intervened militarily and helped defeat David at Matkhoji in July 1789, thereby restoring Grigol to Mingrelia and securing the crown of Imereti for his maternal grandson, Solomon II. This was followed by the 1790 treaty, which established a loose confederation of Georgian kings and princes. Grigol then married Heraclius's granddaughter Princess Nino, while Grigol's sister Mariam became Solomon II's wife.

== Conflict with Imereti ==
The unresolved dispute over Lechkhumi, however, quickly led to a renewed conflict between Imereti and Mingrelia. In 1791, Solomon II of Imereti succeeded in ousting Grigol in favor of his own younger brother, Manuchar. Grigol fled to the Ottoman pasha of Akhaltsikhe. King Heraclius II's mediation failed and Grigol was detained on his arrival for negotiations in Kutaisi, Imereti's capital. He soon managed to escape with the help of his uncle, Giorgi Dadiani, and Kaikhosro Gelovani, governor-general of Lechkhumi, and entrenched himself in the fortress of Nogi in Mingrelia, which Solomon failed to take and fell back to Kutaisi. As a result, the king had to recognize Grigol as prince of Mingrelia, who, in his turn, conceded the fiefdom of Salipartiano to his estranged brother Manuchar, Solomon's protégé. Grigol, however, found his authority limited by rising influence of Kaikhosro Gelovani, whom he had murdered in 1799.

Peace with Imereti did not endure. In 1802, Solomon invaded Lechkhumi, defeated Dadiani at Salkhino, and had him replaced by another brother, Tariel. Grigol quickly regained his position, but he had to concede the fort of Anaklia and to surrender his own son and heir, Levan, as an honorary hostage to Kelesh Ahmed-Bey Sharvashidze, ruler of Abkhazia, in exchange of received support.

== Mingrelia joins Russia ==
By that time, a momentous event had taken place in Georgia; in 1801, the Russian Empire annexed the eastern Georgian Kingdom of Kartli-Kakheti. In October 1802, Grigol Dadiani approached the Russian commander in Georgia, Prince Tsitsianov, expressing his desire to put himself under Russian protection, provided his and his descendants' rights as rulers of Mingrelia were guaranteed. The Russian diplomats, having secured Ottoman neutrality on the Mingrelian issue, formalized the agreement with Dadiani with the Treaty of Dadichala on 1 December 1803, which was ratified by Tsar Alexander I on 20 March 1804. Dadiani was recognized as Prince of Mingrelia, the legal ruler of "Odishi, Lechkhumi, Svaneti, and Abkhazia", in exchange of Dadiani’s acceptance of the Tsar's suzerainty. The treaty, which would remain in force until 1856, made Mingrelia an autonomous principality within the Russian Empire and a cornerstone of Russian imperial power-building in western Caucasus. On the occasion of the conclusion of the treaty, Grigol was awarded the Order of Saint Alexander Nevsky, which was returned by the Russian authorities to the Imperial Administration of Orders after the prince's death, ignoring Princess Nino's request to leave it in the Dadiani family.

In 1804, Solomon II followed Dadiani's suit, accepting the Russian suzerainty at gunpoint. Both rulers were reassured by the Russians regarding the ownership of Lechkhumi, but the disputed district remained under Dadiani's control. Grigol then tried to exploit Russia's increasingly tense relations with Imereti and went so far as to petition the Tsar to depose Solomon II as king and to replace him with his cousin, Prince Ioane of Georgia. The Russian government, still hoping to bend Solomon into submission, immediately disavowed the plan.

== Death and aftermath ==
As the renewed crisis over Lechkhumi was unfolding, Grigol Dadiani died, unexpectedly, at Muri in October 1804. He was buried at the Martvili Monastery. Grigol's widow, Princess Nino, who assumed regency for Grigol's heir, Levan, immediately accused the rival nobles of having poisoned the prince and requested from the Russian commander in Georgia, Prince Pavel Tsitsianov, to have an inquiry into her husband's murder. On the other hand, Nino's opponents spread rumors that the princess herself was behind the murder of Prince Grigol, who had been briefly involved with a woman of the Chichua family. Tsitsianov himself exploited the suspicion of homicide to remove Grigol's treating doctor, the Italian Capuchin missionary Nicola di Rutigliano, who was suspected of anti-Russian intrigues.

== Family ==
Grigol Dadiani and his wife, Nino, daughter of King George XII, had two sons and four daughters:

- Ketevan (born 1792), who married first Manuchar Shervashidze, Prince of Samurzakano (died 1813), and then, in 1823, Rostom-Bey, son of Kelesh Ahmed-Bey Shervashidze, Prince of Abkhazia. A grandson of her first marriage was Prince Giorgi Shervashidze (1847–1918), Governor of Tiflis, known for his persecution of the doukhobors in 1895.
- Levan V Dadiani (1793–1846), Prince of Mingrelia (r. 1804–1840).
- Mariam (born 1794), who was married firstly to Prince Giorgi Eristavi of Guria and secondly, c. 1810, to Prince Rostom (Tato), son of Beri Gelovani, Lord of Lechkhumi.
- Elene (born 1795), who was married firstly to Prince David Gurieli (died 1833), son of George V Gurieli, and secondly to Prince Giorgi Mikeladze.
- Ekaterine (born 1797), who married in 1810 Colonel Prince Beglar (Petre) Jambakur-Orbeliani (1776–1819), son of Prince Zaal Orbeliani.
- Giorgi (1798–c. 1851), Major-General of the Russian army. He married, at Ryazan in 1839, Countess Elizaveta Pahlena, daughter of General Count Pavel Pahlen, and had no issue.

== Notes ==
Grigol Dadiani House of Dadiani Born: 1770 Died: 23 October 1804
Regnal titles
Preceded by Katsia II Dadiani	Prince of Mingrelia; 1788–1791	Succeeded by Manuchar II Dadiani
Preceded by Tariel Dadiani	Prince of Mingrelia; 1794–1802	Succeeded by Tariel Dadiani
Preceded by Tariel Dadiani	Prince of Mingrelia; 1802–1804	Succeeded by Levan V Dadiani
