= Mariam Dadiani (1783–1841) =

Queen of Imereti from 1789 to 1810

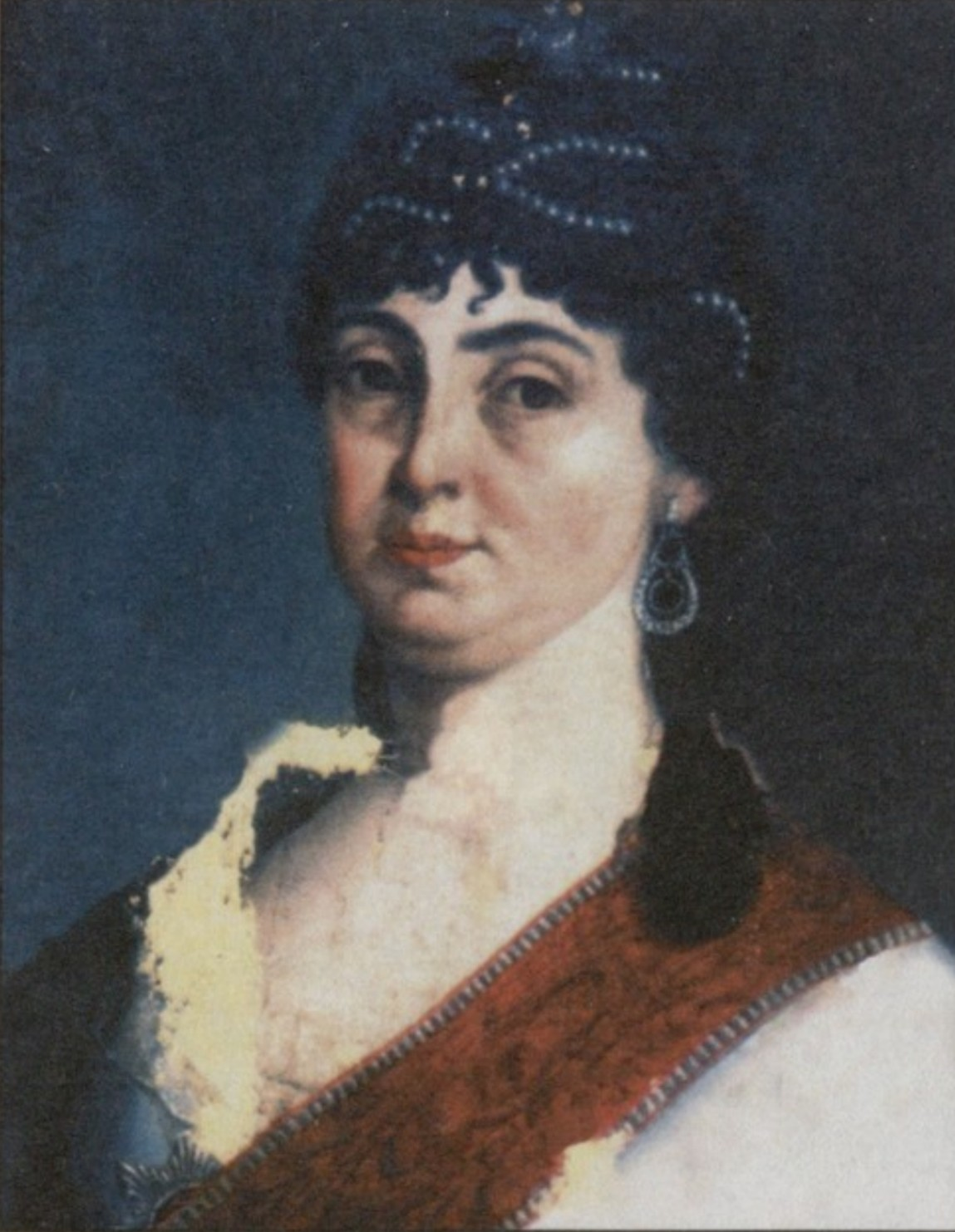

Queen consort of Imereti
- Tenure: 1789–1810
- Born: 1783
- Died: 19 March 1841 (aged 57–58); Saint Petersburg, Russian Empire
- Burial: Donskoy Monastery
- Spouse: Solomon II of Imereti (m. 1791; died 1815)
- House: Dadiani
- Father: Katsia II Dadiani
- Mother: Ana Tsulukidze
- Religion: Georgian Orthodox Church
- Khelrtva

Mariam Dadiani (Georgian: მარიამ დადიანი; 1783 – 19 March 1841) was the last Queen Consort of the western Georgian kingdom of Imereti as the wife of King Solomon II. She was a daughter of Katsia II Dadiani, Prince of Mingrelia. After the Russian conquest of Imereti and Solomon's flight to the Ottoman Empire in 1810, Mariam fell in the hands of the Russian authorities who sent her in exile to Russia proper, where she was known as Maria Katsiyevna Imeretinskaya (Russian: Мария Кациевна Имеретинская).

== Family background ==
Mariam was born in 1783, in the family of the Mingrelian ruling prince Katsia II Dadiani, Prince of Mingrelia, and his wife, Ana Tsulukidze. In 1791 she was given in marriage to the Imeretian king Solomon II, who later fought his brother-in-law and Katsia's successor, Grigol Dadiani, over territorial disputes. The marriage proved to be childless. Therefore, Solomon had to designate his relative and a son of an old adversary, Prince Constantine, as heir apparent in 1804.

== Downfall ==
Solomon's reign was under threat from the Russian Empire, whose suzerainty he had accepted in 1804. He offered armed resistance to the Russian troops sent in to reinforce the tsar's decision to depose Solomon in February 1810. Mariam stood by her husband's side. Solomon was forced to capitulate in March 1810, but he escaped from captivity and reignited an anti-Russian rebellion in May 1810. The Russian commander-in-chief Alexander Tormasov retaliated by ordering General Simonovich to incarcerate Mariam, her sister Maria, wife of Prince Davit Mikeladze, and Solomon's sister Mariam, wife of Prince Malkhaz Andronikashvili, at the fortress of Poti. The arrested noblewomen were to receive food from their own estates; giving money to them was prohibited. Simonovich advised caution, warning that harsh treatment of the female dignitaries would exasperate the Imeretians.

== Arrest and exile ==
Mariam remained with her beleaguered husband until the king eventually escaped to the Ottoman territory in September 1810. Queen Mariam, on the other hand, fled to Mingrelia under protection of its ruler, Princess Nino. Tormasov inveigled her into surrendering. The Russian military convoy escorted her and other Imeretian female royals to Tbilisi and placed them under custody in November 1810. Queen Mariam and Solomon's sister Mariam, as the fugitive king's corroborators, were deported to Voronezh, whence the queen sent, with the help of Filippo Paulucci, a letter to Solomon, urging him to surrender and return from his exile in the Ottoman Empire.

After the death of Solomon in Trebizond in 1815, Mariam was allowed to move to Moscow, and then to Saint Petersburg in 1817. The tsar granted her a pension and decorated her with the Order of Saint Catherine, Grand Cross. According to one account, in her last years, Mariam personally asked the tsar to allow Solomon II's peasant servant Salaridze, who had helped the king to escape from Russian captivity back in 1810, to return from his exile in Siberia. The permission was granted and Mariam hosted Salaridze at her house, only to find him dead of a heart attack on the next morning. Mariam died in St. Petersburg in 1841, at the age of 58, and was buried at the Donskoy Monastery.

== Bibliography ==
- Toumanoff, Cyril (1976). Manuel de Généalogie et de Chronologie pour l'histoire de la Caucasie chrétienne (Arménie, Géorgie, Albanie) [Manual of Genealogy and Chronology of Christian Caucasian History (Armenia, Georgia, Albania)] (in French). Rome: Edizioni Aquila.
