= Tariel Dadiani =

Tariel "Taia" Dadiani (Georgian: ტარიელ [ტაია] დადიანი; fl. 1793–1833), of the House of Dadiani, was Prince of Mingrelia from 1793 to 1794 and in 1802 as a rival to his elder brother, Grigol Dadiani, whose rule was marred by the long-standing struggle between the Imeretian crown seeking to subdue Mingrelia and Mingrelian efforts to win full independence, a continuation of the conflict which had plagued western Georgia for centuries. Tariel enjoyed the support of King Solomon II of Imereti, whom he joined in an uprising against the Imperial Russian encroachment in 1810.

== Biography ==
Tariel was a son of Katsia II Dadiani by his third wife, Princess Anna Tsulukidze. In 1791, King Solomon II of Imereti, who sought to unite all of western Georgia under his authority, deposed Grigol Dadiani and replaced him by his more amenable brother Manuchar. Manuchar's positions was soon tattered by Grigol's continuing efforts to comeback and he had to seek refuge in neighboring Abkhazia. Solomon then briefly installed Tariel as prince-regnant, but Grigol prevailed by 1794. With Solomon's renewed offensive in Mingrelia in 1802, Grigol was once again deposed and replaced by Tariel, but the king's success was short-lived. Grigol was able to resume his tenure and placed, in 1804, Mingrelia under the Russian protection.

When Prince Grigol died in October 1804, his young son and successor Levan was placed under regency of the princess dowager Nino. Tariel, like his brother Manuchar, quickly withdraw in opposition to the new government, further exasperated by Nino's efforts to dispossess her opponents of their estates. By January 1810, Tariel and Manuchar had been in an open revolt. Tariel entrenched himself at the castle of Dzhgali. When a combined Mingrelian-Russian force moved against him, Tariel agreed to surrender provided his estates were confirmed to him. Princess Nino reneged on her promise and Tariel fled to Solomon II of Imereti, joining him in resistance to the Russians. After Solomon's defeat, Tariel moved to the highland province of Lechkhumi and, together with the nobleman Beri Gelovani, induced the locals to take to arms, but the disturbances were quickly contained through Nino's diplomacy. Tariel then joined Solomon in his exile in Akhaltsikhe, in the Ottoman territory and subsequently resided with his in-laws in Guria. Eventually, he reconciled with his nephew Levan, who assumed full ruling powers after Nino was sidelined by the Russian authorities from the Mingrelian government. In 1833, Tariel led a mission to bring Levan's defiant nephew, Dimitri Sharvashidze of Samurzakano, to justice, which ended in Dimitri being killed during a skirmish in Chuburkhinji.

== Family ==
Tariel was married to a daughter of Simon III Gurieli. He had six children, whose descendants still survive.

Tariel Dadiani House of Dadiani Born: ? Died: post-1833
Regnal titles
Preceded by Manuchar II Dadiani	Prince of Mingrelia; 1793–1794	Succeeded by Grigol Dadiani
Preceded by Grigol Dadiani	Prince of Mingrelia; 1802	Succeeded by Grigol Dadiani
