= Katsia II Dadiani =

Prince of Mingrelia

Prince of Mingrelia
- Reign: 1758–1788
- Predecessor: Otia Dadiani
- Successor: Grigol Dadiani
- Died: 6 December 1788
- Burial: Martvili Monastery
- Spouse: Darejan Sharvashidze; Elisabeth Bagrationi (1765-1770); Ana Tsulukidze (1770-1788)
- Issue Among others: Grigol Dadiani; Manuchar II Dadiani; Tariel Dadiani; Mariam Dadiani
- House: Dadiani
- Father: Otia Dadiani
- Mother: Gulkan Chkheidze
- Religion: Georgian Orthodox Church (Catholicate of Abkhazia)

Katsia II Dadiani (Georgian: კაცია II დადიანი; died 6 December 1788) was a Georgian prince who ruled the Principality of Mingrelia from 1758 to 1788.

A member of the House of Chikovani-Dadiani, which had governed Mingrelia since the late 17th century, he was the son of Prince Otia Dadiani, whom he succeeded upon his death in 1758. Inheriting a principality torn by internal conflicts, Katsia initially served as a close ally of his suzerain, the young King Solomon I of Imereti, whom he assisted during the Battle of Khresili and later supported at the royal assembly of 1759, during which the Kingdom of Imereti prohibited the slave trade.

Despite a policy largely aligned with that of other Georgian states, Katsia was forced to join the Ottoman Empire during its invasion of western Georgia in 1765. This led to a protracted war between Mingrelia and Imereti lasting until 1776, and to the schism of the Western Georgian Orthodox Church (1769–1774), despite multiple mediation efforts by the Catholicate of Abkhazia, the Kingdom of Kartli-Kakheti, and Russian Empire.

During the Russo-Turkish War of 1768–1774, Katsia II shifted allegiance to the Russian forces under General Tottleben, who encouraged a Mingrelian uprising against Solomon I and joined Dadiani in the siege of Poti, which ended in disaster for the Russians. The Treaty of Küçük Kaynarca placed Mingrelia under nominal Ottoman protection, though in practice this had little effect, as only Poti remained under Turkish control.

In 1780, Katsia and Solomon successfully repelled a major Abkhaz–Circassian invasion supported by the Ottoman Empire at the Battle of Rukhi. Subsequently, Katsia intervened in Abkhazia to install Zurab Sharvashidze on the princely throne.

Following Solomon's death in 1784, Katsia proclaimed David II as King of Imereti in opposition to the legitimate heir, triggering a series of noble revolts and an attempted Ottoman invasion aimed at placing Prince Kaikhosro Abashidze on the Imeretian throne. Under David II's reign, Katsia II Dadiani expanded his wealth and territories, secured the de jure independence of Mingrelia, and sought the protection of the Russian Empire.

== Early Life and Military Career ==
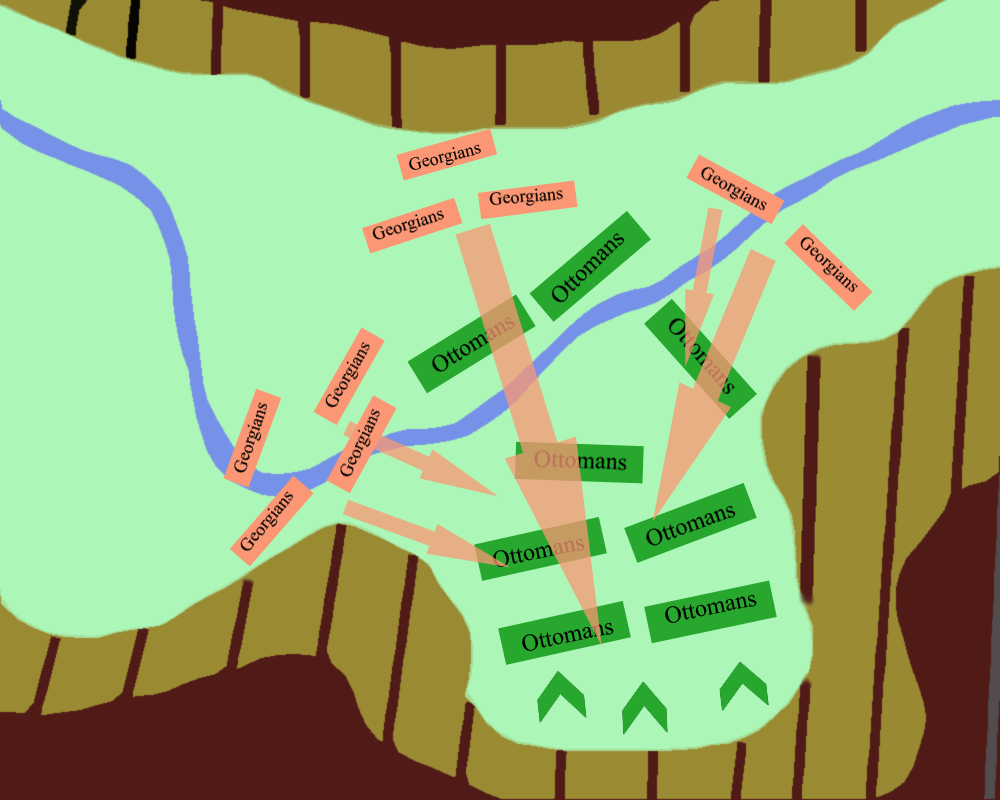
Map of the Battle of Khresili.

Born at an unknown date during the first half of the 18th century, Katsia Dadiani was the eldest son of Prince Otia Dadiani and his wife, Gulkhan Chkheidze, daughter of Duke Shoshita III of Racha. He was thus raised within a family deeply involved in the civil conflicts that devastated western Georgia during the reign of Alexander V of Imereti.

Little is known about his early life, but Katsia gradually gained influence within the Principality of Mingrelia—a territory formally dependent on the crown of Imereti yet pursuing an increasingly independent and defiant policy as his father aged. With the accession of Solomon I to the Imeretian throne in 1752, royal policy became openly opposed to Ottoman dominance, as demonstrated by the 1757 ban on the slave trade, one of the main sources of commercial revenue from Anatolia.

That same year, the Ottomans attempted to overthrow Solomon by force. In December, they launched a large-scale invasion of Imereti with 40,000 men under the command of Haji Ahmad, Pasha of Akhaltsikhe, while Solomon secured military support from Mingrelia and the neighboring Principality of Guria. Too old to lead his troops in person, Otia Dadiani sent Katsia at the head of a battalion of Mingrelians and Lechkhumians, accompanied by Khutunia Sharvashidze, Count of Samurzakano—a frontier march between Mingrelia and Abkhazia. On 14 December, Katsia joined the royal forces on the plains of Okriba. Together, they confronted the Ottomans at the Battle of Khresili.

Despite the numerical superiority of the Ottoman forces, the Georgian alliance achieved a decisive victory. During the battle, Solomon personally killed the Ottoman pasha, while the contingent of Khutunia Sharvashidze displayed remarkable heroism that proved crucial to the outcome, though the count himself was killed in combat. The victory at Khresili strengthened Solomon I's position on the throne, and in 1758 he concluded a mutual defense pact with the Georgian monarchs Teimuraz II of Kartli and Heraclius II of Kakheti—an alliance that shaped the political landscape of western Georgia for the remainder of the eighteenth century.

== Reign ==
=== Accession and early reign ===
In 1758, upon the death of his father, Katsia succeeded him as Prince of Mingrelia under the name Katsia II Dadiani. He inherited a principality precariously situated between the crown of Imereti, which he formally recognized as his suzerain, and the Ottoman Empire, which controlled the coastline of the Black Sea. Despite the royal edict of 1757, the trade of Mingrelian slaves to Trebizond and Constantinople remained particularly active.

At the same time, Katsia II demonstrated his independence by nationalizing the cultivation of tobacco in the provinces of Tsalenjikha and Djgali, which had previously been under Ottoman monopoly. The continual unrest within and around Mingrelia forced Dadiani to move his court frequently from village to village. During these displacements, he developed close relations with the peasantry of his principality, often accepting their hospitality personally.

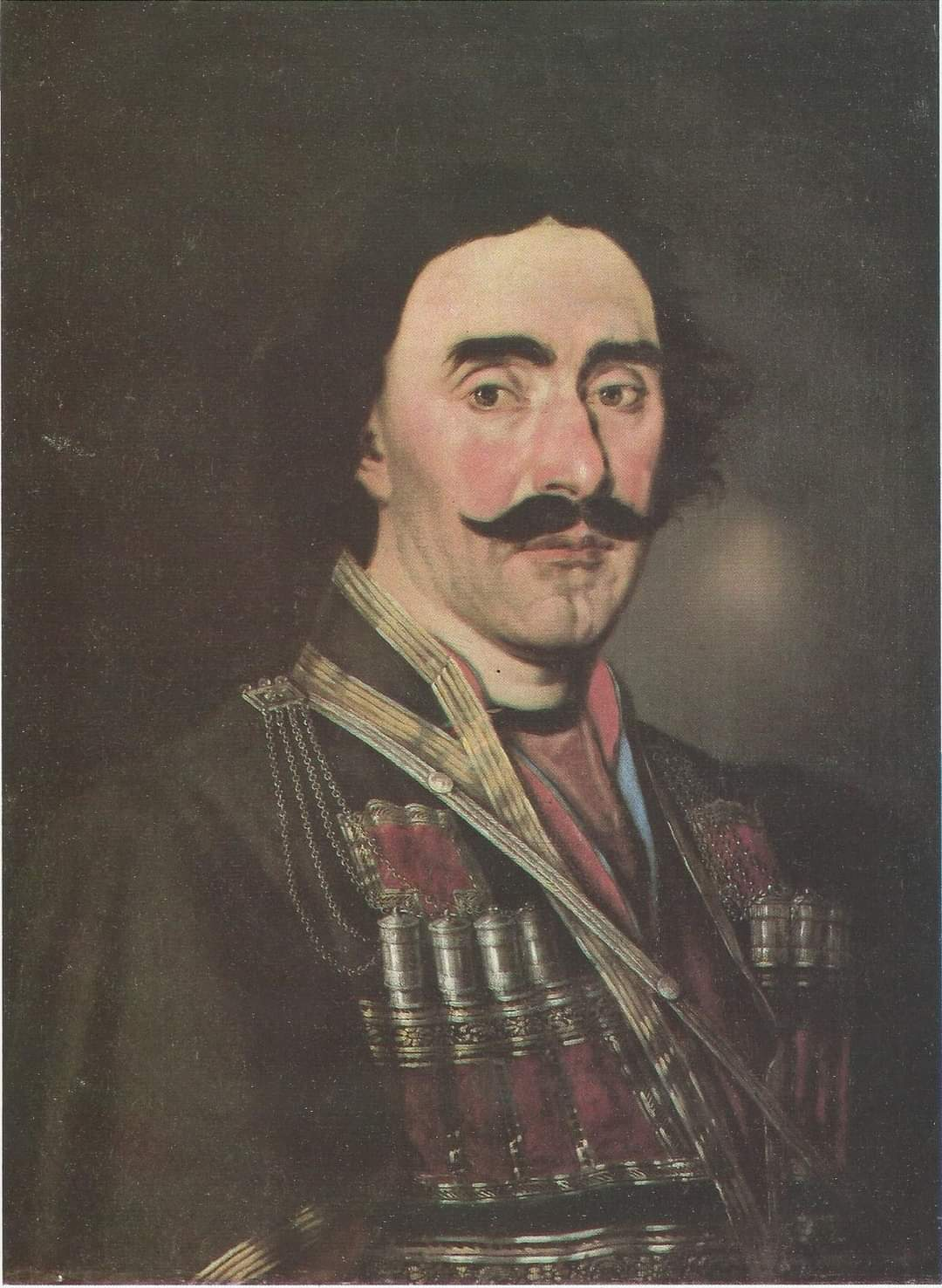
Solomon I, King of Imereti

King Solomon I, viewing the victory at Khresili as an opportunity to consolidate his power, convened on 4 December 1759 a legislative assembly in Kutaisi composed of the leading noble and ecclesiastical figures of western Georgia, attended by Katsia II and the major nobles of Mingrelia. Over the course of a month, the assembly enacted numerous socio-economic and religious reforms, reorganizing the Catholicate of Abkhazia as an executive branch of the royal government, re-establishing the Eparchy of Kutaisi (under direct royal control), and exempting the Church from taxation.

The most significant reform adopted by the assembly was an agreement between the king, Katsia II, and Prince Mamia IV of Guria to prohibit the slave trade throughout western Georgia. On 5 December, Katsia II formally recognized Solomon I before the assembly as the “undisputed sovereign” of all western Georgia.

Following the Assembly of 1759, Katsia II pursued a policy of conciliation with the other Georgian monarchs—a rare instance of South Caucasian unity after centuries of internal conflict. In 1760, he joined Solomon I and Duke Rostom of Racha in providing a 15,000-man contingent to assist King Heraclius II of Kartli-Kakheti in his invasion of Ganja. In November 1765, Katsia divorced the Abkhazian noblewoman Darejan Sharvashidze to marry Princess Elisabeth, sister of Heraclius II, thereby strengthening this intra-Georgian alliance.

=== Conflict with Solomon I ===
The alliance between the Georgian rulers changed in 1765, when an Ottoman army of 40,000 soldiers invaded western Imereti, overthrew the Prince of Guria despite Katsia's military intervention, and threatened Mingrelia. To prevent the devastation of his principality, Dadiani allowed the Ottomans to encamp in Mingrelia during the winter, from where they prepared for a full invasion of Imereti. In the spring of 1766, the Turks, under the command of General Hasan Pasha, entered the kingdom with the support of Mingrelia and captured the citadel of Sveri.

Within weeks, they reached the capital, Kutaisi, deposed King Solomon, and proclaimed his cousin Teimuraz as King of Imereti. After the Ottoman withdrawal, Katsia Dadiani, George V of Guria, and Rostom of Racha continued to support Teimuraz. The alliance between Mingrelia and the Kingdom of Kartli-Kakheti soon collapsed following the death of Elizabeth Orbeliani, after which Katsia refused to return her “very rich dowry.”

Despite his deposition, Solomon remained in Imereti, waging a fierce guerrilla campaign against the usurper with the aid of Lezgin mercenaries. In 1767, the dethroned king regained his crown, and thanks to the intervention of Russian Empire, the Ottoman Empire refrained from aiding Teimuraz. On 28 January 1768, Katsia Dadiani, Teimuraz, and Rostom of Racha were defeated by Solomon and his army of Lezgins at the battle of Chkheri.

Upon regaining power, Solomon attacked the Duchy of Racha in 1769. Fearing that the next royal campaign would target Lechkhumi—a Mingrelian county bordering Racha—Katsia supported Duke Rostom with an Abkhazian detachment. Rostom, however, was defeated and took refuge in Mingrelia, while his duchy was officially annexed to the Kingdom of Imereti. The king continued consolidating his authority, expanding the influence of his allied clans, which alarmed Katsia.

In 1769, Dadiani renounced the 1759 pact that had recognized Solomon's sovereignty, to which the king responded by officially abolishing the Principality of Mingrelia—though this remained only de jure. This political dispute soon escalated into open warfare.

The chronicler Iovane Khojevani provides detailed accounts of Katsia II's raids across the Imeretian frontier, particularly around Khoni. Prince Archil, the king's brother, led royal forces against Dadiani in 1769–1770, employing Lezgin mercenaries. In 1770, he ravaged the village of Kvitiri near Kutaisi, while the capital itself was repeatedly evacuated in fear of Mingrelian assaults. Katsia II only ceased his raids temporarily when faced with the threat of an Imeretian invasion of Mingrelia. During this period, Ottoman influence grew significantly among the regional nobility.

=== Western Georgia in the Russo-Turkish War (1768–1774) ===
The conflict between Katsia II and Solomon I unfolded within a much broader geopolitical context. In 1768, war broke out between Russian Empire and the Ottoman Empire, making Georgia one of the fronts of the confrontation. Following the example of his eastern neighbor Heraclius II, Solomon allied himself with Orthodox Russia against the Muslim enemy, while Katsia, in opposition to the central authority, became a natural ally of the Turks. Russian plans for an early intervention in Imereti were abandoned due to Katsia's raids.

On 3 October 1769, Russo-Imeretian troops laid siege to the citadel of Shorapani, a Turkish stronghold in the heart of Imereti. In response, Suleiman Pasha of Akhaltsikhe gathered Katsia, Manuchar II Sharvashidze, Prince of Abkhazia, and forces from Trebizond to launch a joint invasion of the small kingdom. Solomon was forced to abandon the siege and, on 20 December, engaged Katsia's 9,000 troops, defeating them and ordering pursuit of the Mingrelians. The king ravaged Mingrelia and temporarily captured Katsia.

In early 1770, Heraclius II sent his son George and Catholicos Anton I to western Georgia to reconcile Dadiani and Solomon and unite them against the Turks, securing a fragile truce. Nevertheless, Katsia refused to assist the Georgians at the Battle of Aspindza on 20 April. Following Heraclius II's victory at Aspindza, he sent Katsia II a gold and silver sword as both a symbol of triumph and a warning against any pro-Ottoman sympathies in Mingrelia.

After the Russian general Tottleben returned to Georgia in March 1770, Katsia sent an emissary to his base at Tskhinvali to pledge allegiance to Empress Catherine II. Together, Russian and Mingrelian forces expelled the Turks from Rukhi and Anaklia. Tottleben then acted as mediator between Katsia and Solomon; the latter agreed to the alliance only in exchange for an increase in Russian troops stationed in Imereti.

Relations between Tottleben and Solomon broke down on 3 October, when the Russian general decided to besiege the port city of Poti against the king's advice. Tottleben encouraged a renewal of hostilities between Mingrelia and Imereti, and, with the help of Mingrelian, Abkhazian, and Gurian forces, he began the siege of Poti later that month. The operation proved a strategic mistake. Despite Solomon's efforts to resist Ottoman reinforcements, the region's estuaries created harsh conditions; Russian soldiers complained of Katsia II's lack of commitment, and on 1 February 1771, Tottleben learned of the treason of the new Abkhazian prince Zurab Sharvashidze, forcing him to withdraw his troops.

The Poti debacle and Tottleben's encouragement of Katsia's rebellion led the Russian government to recall the general.

Negotiations between Katsia II and Solomon soon began in the village of Matkhodji under the mediation of Catholicos Joseph of Abkhazia. During these talks, the king demanded recognition of his suzerainty and the province of Lechkhumi. However, the negotiations, which lasted until 1773, were fruitless. Mingrelia subsequently joined Russian forces under General Nikolai Sukhotin, Tottleben's successor, when he resumed the siege of Poti in April 1771. Half of the Russian army perished from malaria, and Sukhotin withdrew from western Georgia in October, accusing Katsia of insufficient support.

In 1772, the Turks launched another invasion of Imereti, supported by Prince Kaikhosro Abashidze, while Dadiani remained neutral. In 1773, responding to a political and military alliance between Imereti and Kartli-Kakheti, Katsia Dadiani and Zurab of Abkhazia allied with the Pasha of Akhaltsikhe.

That same year, Catholicos Joseph's mediation was replaced by the direct intervention of Heraclius II between Imereti and Mingrelia. The negotiations failed, and Solomon led his army against Katsia, who prepared his cavalry to resist the Imeretian invasion. Russian Captain Yazikov, then in Georgia to investigate Tottleben's conduct, described the situation as follows: “If I had not warned Solomon in the name of the emperor, he would have destroyed Dadiani, for Solomon is now stronger and all of Imereti is in his hands.”

In January 1774, Suleiman of Akhaltsikhe assembled 3,700 men for a final invasion of Imereti, requesting Katsia II's assistance. Solomon urgently appealed to Heraclius for help in threatening the Mingrelian prince. Heraclius II mobilized his army, forcing Katsia to remain out of the conflict, and Solomon inflicted a decisive defeat on the Ottomans at the Battle of Chkheri.

The events of January 1774 brought Katsia back to the Georgian side. However, Heraclius II's failed embassy to Russia, which sought permanent military support, prevented a joint offensive by Kartli-Kakheti, Imereti, and Mingrelia into Anatolia. The Treaty of Küçük Kaynarca, signed on 21 July 1774, ended the Russo-Turkish War. Article XXIII of the treaty freed Mingrelia from any threat of Ottoman annexation while making the region a de jure protectorate of the Ottoman Empire. The treaty also granted the Ottomans the right to return to the citadels of Rukhi and Anaklia, though this right was never exercised.

=== Return under Imeretian Influence and Battle of Rukhi ===
The end of the Russo-Turkish War strengthened the position of Solomon I, who prioritized the reunification of western Georgia. In 1774, Katsia II met with Catholicos Joseph of Abkhazia — a gesture symbolizing recognition of the latter's religious supremacy for the first time since 1769. Solomon I annulled his 1769 decree abolishing the Principality of Mingrelia, opening the way for negotiations. The two leaders met in Khoni, but Katsia, fearing Solomon's centralizing ambitions, failed to reach an agreement with the king.

In 1776, war broke out between Imereti and Mingrelia. Solomon invaded the principality and captured the citadel of Gordi. He defeated Lord Paghaveli and broke through Dadiani's defensive lines, forcing Katsia to accept a peace agreement that made Solomon the suzerain of Mingrelia.

The Sublime Porte, dissatisfied with its declining influence in western Georgia, devised a new plan to invade Imereti, this time seeking support from Circassian tribes and Abkhazian princes. Abkhazia at this time was divided among several members of the Sharvashidze family, the eldest of whom, Zurab, was officially supported by Katsia II in his control over the central part of the region. However, the Ottomans enlisted Kelesh Ahmed-Bey Sharvashidze, Zurab's nephew, to lead an anti-Mingrelian revolt. The power of Kelesh Ahmed Bey compelled both Zurab and Levan Sharvashidze, Count of Samurzakano and a long-standing ally of the Dadiani, to join the Ottoman cause.

The Abkhazians were soon joined by tribes from Jiketi, Ossetia, and Circassia, as well as Şahin Giray, Khan of Crimea. The Abkhazian uprising resulted in the loss of all Mingrelian influence over Samurzakano in 1779 and threatened the destruction of the remainder of Mingrelia.

In 1780, Dadiani appealed to Solomon I for assistance, who agreed in exchange for a renewed oath of allegiance. By March, Abkhazian forces reached the banks of the Enguri River, the natural border between Abkhazia and Mingrelia, while Solomon arrived with Imeretian and Gurian troops. Solomon's intervention was carefully calculated: not only did it force Mingrelia once again to acknowledge Imereti's suzerainty, but it also prevented an Ottoman invasion of Imereti that would have followed the conquest of Mingrelia.

Solomon, Katsia, and George V of Guria met in Bandza and advanced together toward the citadel of Rukhi to form a defensive line. The Battle of Rukhi, fought in March 1780, is described in detail by the royal chronicler Besiki Gabashvili, who witnessed the conflict and praised the heroism of Solomon, Katsia, and George Dadiani, the prince's son. Niko Dadiani, historian of the Principality of Mingrelia, refers to it as a “bloody battle” that ended in a decisive Georgian victory. Solomon commanded the allied left flank, while Katsia led the remaining forces.

The Abkhaz-Circassian troops, armed with Ottoman muskets and supported by a fierce cavalry, were defeated, and many were taken prisoner. The Battle of Rukhi effectively ended Ottoman ambitions in Mingrelia until the Crimean War.

== Last years ==
=== Intervention in Abkhazia ===
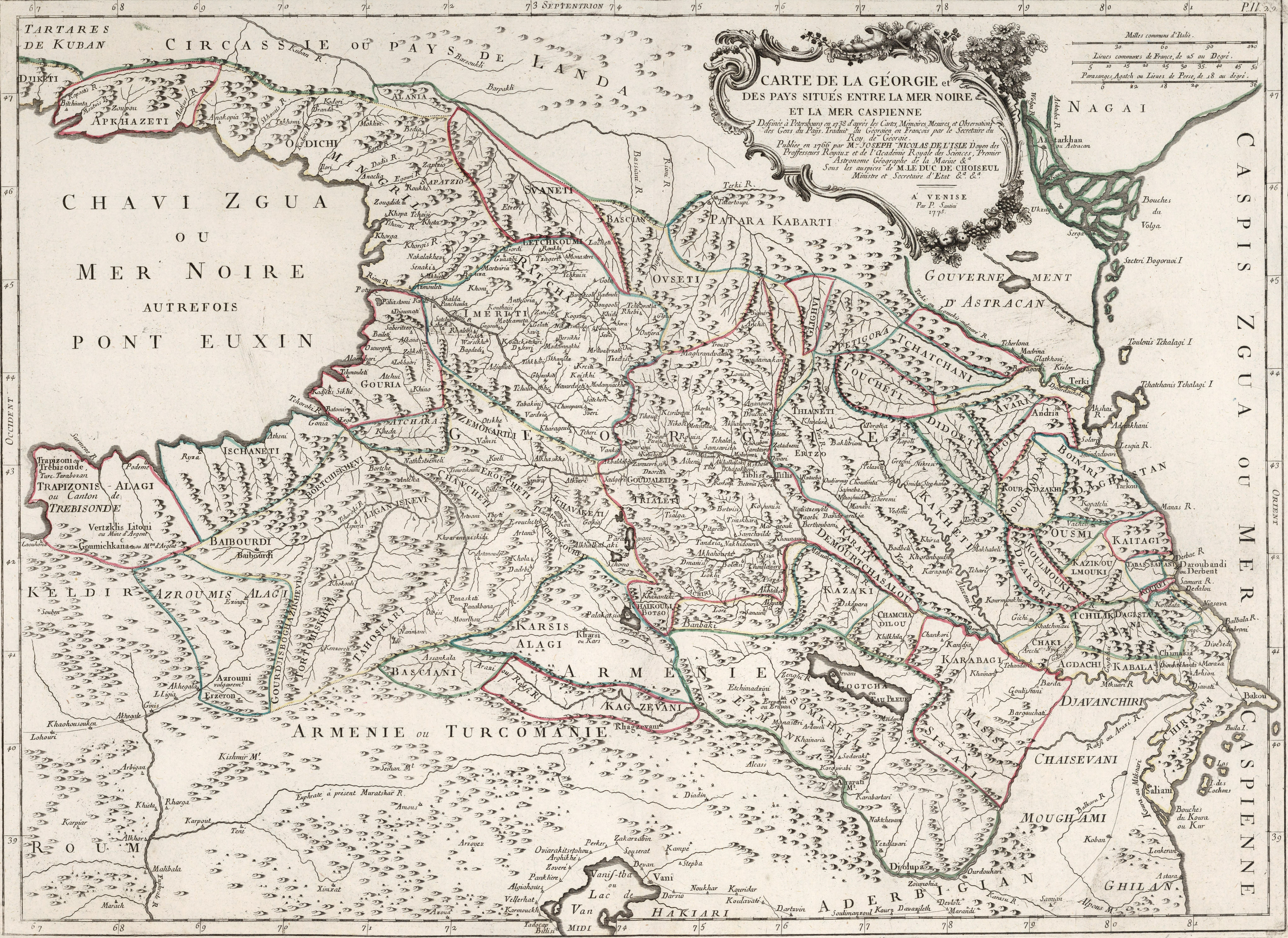
Map of Georgia from 1775, showing the borders of Mingrelia in yellow.

Following the Battle of Rukhi, the Sublime Porte encouraged an internal revolt in Abkhazia led by Kelesh Ahmed-Bey Sharvashidze, who overthrew his uncle Zurab. Zurab sought refuge with Katsia II, who decided to aid him in order to prevent the complete takeover of the region by the Ottomans. In Zugdidi, Katsia devised a plan to invade Abkhazia and entrusted his brother George Dadiani with escorting Zurab to Sukhumi. Mingrelian forces quickly regained control of Samurzakano and advanced to Sukhumi by bribing local clans. The Mingrelians soon destroyed the city's small defensive garrison, and Zurab was proclaimed Prince of Abkhazia by George Dadiani.

After the Mingrelian troops had completed their mission, George Dadiani returned to Mingrelia, and Zurab was compelled to allow Kelesh Ahmed Bey to rule the northern part of Abkhazia. The Mingrelian withdrawal proved to be a strategic mistake, and Zurab was overthrown once again a few months later. Meanwhile, Katsia II reaffirmed his suzerainty over Samurzakano by arranging the marriage of his son Manuchar to Elisabeth, daughter of Count Levan Sharvashidze.

=== Death of Solomon I and the Succession Crisis ===
In March 1784, King Solomon I organized an expedition to liberate Adjara from Ottoman control. Katsia II not only refused to provide troops to the king but also secretly warned the Pasha of Poti. According to historian Otar Patieshvili, this act of treachery stemmed from the Mingrelian prince's fear that the capture of the port of Batumi would damage the slave trade. Despite an initial victory at Chakvi, Solomon was defeated at the Battle of Nachikhrevi on 9 March — a disastrous engagement that killed dozens of Imeretian nobles and left the king wounded.

Solomon never recovered from the defeat and died a month later, sparking a succession crisis over the Imeretian throne. The contenders were David, Solomon's nephew and designated heir since 1783, and another David, Solomon's cousin and the son of the deposed King George IX. Upon the king's death, the young heir — then 12 years old — was at the court of Heraclius II, his grandfather, in Kakheti. Katsia II took advantage of the distance by landing at Kutaisi with George V of Guria and proclaiming George IX's son as King of Imereti under the name David II on 4 May 1784.

It was only after this swift proclamation that Heraclius II learned of Solomon's death. He chose not to intervene immediately to avoid a war with his brother-in-law.

=== Katsia and the Georgian Reunification Project ===
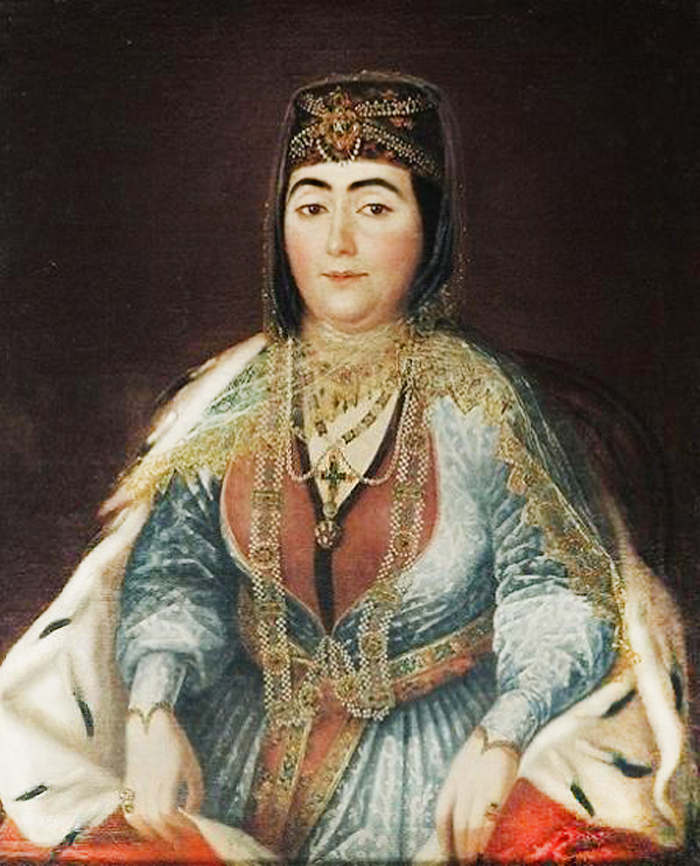
Darejan Dadiani, cousin of Katsia II and Queen of Kartli-Kakheti.

An agreement was formalized under which David II pledged to continue the foreign policy of Solomon I and to rule only during the minority of the young heir David. This compromise opened the door to a potential project for the reunification of Georgia, which had been divided since the 15th century.

A few months after David II's proclamation, a group of influential Imeretian nobles sent a delegation to Tbilisi to make an official request for the unification of the Georgian kingdoms. It is possible that Katsia Dadiani supported the proposal, as suggested by the Imeretian delegation, but his support appears to have been limited: the Prince of Mingrelia preferred to see one of his cousin's (Queen Darejan) sons ascend the throne of a united Georgian kingdom.

During the summer of 1784, King Heraclius II convened his royal council to deliberate on the matter. The council was divided between factions supporting Georgian reunification and those opposing it. Queen Darejan, in correspondence with Katsia, orchestrated a series of intrigues during the debates. Ultimately, the royal council voted against the reunification of Georgia.

=== End of Reign ===
In Imereti, Katsia continued to provide military support to King David II. In gratitude, David granted him the strategically important fiefs of Samikelao and Sachilao, along with 700 peasant families. This decision provoked widespread discontent among the peasantry, who preferred the taxation system of the royal domains, as well as among the great nobles, who opposed the growing power of Prince Katsia Dadiani.

On the Ottoman side, the Sublime Porte proclaimed the noble Kaikhosro Abashidze as king of Imereti and prepared an invasion of western Georgia. Abashidze, together with the nobles Beri and Giorgi Tulukidze and Papuna Tsereteli, assembled at Akhaltsikhe, joined by the young heir David. On 30 October 1784, the Ottomans launched their invasion. David II was strongly supported by Katsia, who managed to divert the Turkish forces within a few weeks.

In December, the Ottoman Empire began a second large-scale invasion across several fronts and imposed a maritime blockade on Mingrelia. On 21 December, Katsia II formally requested that Russian Empire place Mingrelia under Russian protection. Although Catherine II sent no direct reply, she awarded Dadiani the Order of Saint Alexander Nevsky, a gesture sufficient to compel the Ottomans to end their campaign.

During the final years of Katsia II's reign, the prince formalized Mingrelia's independence from the Kingdom of Imereti. He likely continued to support David II against the Imeretian nobility and began preparing Mingrelian forces when the new Russo-Turkish War broke out in 1787. Katsia II Dadiani died on 6 December 1788 in Zugdidi and was succeeded by his eldest son, Grigol. He was buried at the Martvili Monastery.

== Family ==
Katsia II Dadiani was married three times. His first wife was Princess Darejan Sharvashidze, whom he divorced. On 16 November 1765, he married his second wife, Princess Elisabeth (1750–1770), daughter of King Teimuraz II. His third wife was Anna, daughter of Prince Paata Tsulukidze. His children were:

- Grigol Dadiani (1770–1804), Prince of Mingrelia (r. 1788–1804, with intermissions);
- Otia;
- Bezhan;
- Manuchar II Dadiani (died c. 1840), Prince of Mingrelia (r. 1791–1793);
- Tariel Dadiani, Prince of Mingrelia (r. 1793–1794, 1802);
- Besarion (1764–1828), Archbishop of Chqondidi;
- George;
- Levan;
- Elisabeth, who married Rostom Tsereteli, son of Papuna Tsereteli;
- Ioane (1777–1823);
- Tamar (1778–?), who married Sefer Ali-Bey (George) Sharvashidze, Prince of Abkhazia;
- Mariam (1783–1841), who married Solomon II of Imereti.

== Notes ==
Katsia II Dadiani House of Dadiani Born: ? Died: 1788
Regnal titles
Preceded by Otia Dadiani	Prince of Mingrelia; 1758–1788	Succeeded by Grigol Dadiani
