= Didi-Niko Dadiani =

Nikoloz "Didi-Niko" Dadiani (Georgian: ნიკოლოზ ["დიდი ნიკო"] დადიანი; 1764 – 25 February 1834) was a Georgian nobleman of the House of Dadiani and a historian. He played a prominent role in the government of the Principality of Mingrelia, which became an autonomous subject of the Russian Empire in 1804. Dadiani's principal historical work is The History of the Georgians, whose final chapters are an indispensable source for the early modern history of western Georgia. Nikoloz Dadiani, his name hypocorized to Niko, was named didi, Georgian for "big", to distinguish him from his younger namesakes in the Dadiani family.

== Political career ==
Nikoloz Dadiani was a son of Giorgi Dadiani (died 1799), brother of Katsia II Dadiani, Prince of Mingrelia. His involvement in the politics and government of Mingrelia began in October 1804, when he became a member of the regency council for his underage relative, Levan V Dadiani, a grandson of Katsia II. The council was presided by Levan's mother, the dowager-princess Nino. A few months earlier, Mingrelia had become part of the Russian Empire as an autonomous principality. In 1805, Didi-Niko Dadini led a Mingrelian delegation to St. Petersburg sent to address the principality's territorial grievances with its neighbors. On his return, Dadiani found himself at odds with the dowager-princess, whom he accused of using the regency council to appease her own ambitions. After Levan V Dadiani became of age and Nino was sidelined from Mingrelia's government in 1811, Didi-Niko Dadiani's influence grew. The prince-regnant Levan had little interest in government affairs and day-to-day administrative routine and relied on Didi-Niko, who served as a chancellor (mdivanbegi) for years and, between 1804 and 1811, composed a new government code, known as dasturlama, to improve Mingrelia's governance.

Didi-Niko Dadiani was a loyal subject to the Russian crown. As part of the Mingrelian forces ("militia"), he fought on the Russian side in the Russo-Turkish War (1806–1812), Russo-Persian War (1804–13), and Russo-Turkish War (1828–1829). He, further, aided the Russians in suppressing the western Georgian rebellions of 1810 and 1819–1820. He was made major-general and awarded the Order of St. Anna, First Class.

== A historian ==
During his years in government, Dadiani wrote his major historical work, The History of the Georgians (ქართველთ ცხოვრება, k'art'velt' ts'khovreba), which he completed in 1823. It is composed of three parts; the first two segments are based, respectively, on the medieval compendium, kartlis tskhovreba, and the history by Prince Vakhushti of Kartli. The final part is an original work, dealing mostly with the history of western Georgia between 1749 and 1823 and containing many valuable, otherwise unrecorded details. He also wrote a travelogue of his mission to Russia, which has not survived.

Dadiani died in 1834 and was buried at the Martvili Monastery. He was married twice; first, to Mariam née Eristavi of Guria and, then, after her death in 1802, Ekaterine Marshania from Abkhazia. He had seven children—two daughters and five sons. His descendants are still extant.
