= Lazica (disambiguation) =

Lazica may refer to:

- Lazica, an ancient Georgian region and kingdom
- Lazica (planned city), a future urban development in Georgia
- Lazika, a tracked infantry fighting vehicle developed by Georgia
