= Grigol Dadiani (Kolkhideli) =

Georgian general (1814–1901)

Prince Gregory Dadiani
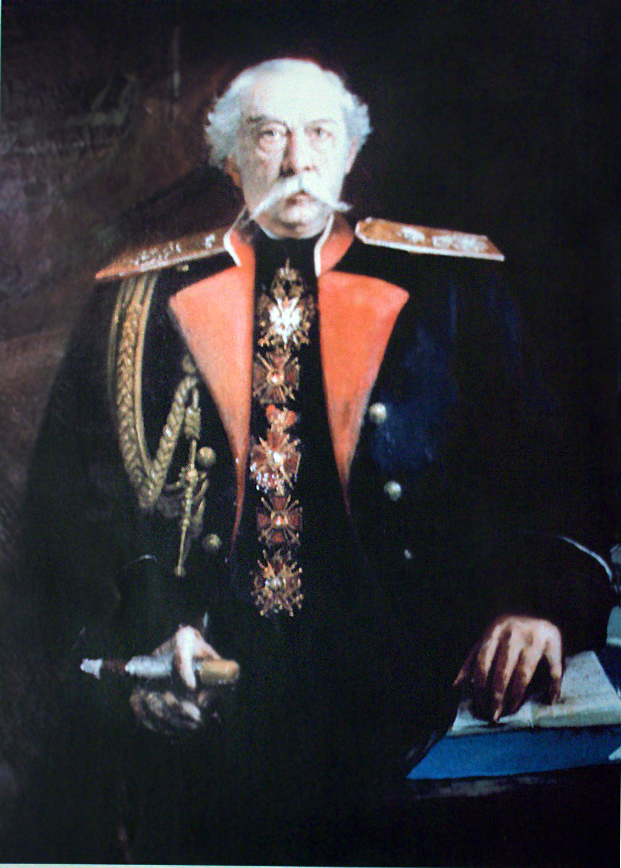
- Born: 6 October 1814
- Died: 24 December 1901 (aged 87)
- Military career
- Allegiance: Russian Empire
- Rank: Adjutant general in the rank of General of the Infantry
- Unit: Preobrazhensky Regiment
- Commands: 1st Brigade, Caucasian Grenadier Division (as major general)
- Conflicts: Russo-Turkish War (1828–1829); Caucasian War; Crimean War; Russo-Turkish War (1877–1878)
- Other work: Poetry & Romanticism

Prince Grigol Dadiani (Georgian: გრიგოლ დადიანი; Russian: Григорий Леванович Дадиани, romanized: Grigory Levanovich Dadiani) (6 October 1814 – 24 December 1901) was a member of the Georgian noble Dadiani family of Mingrelia. He was a son of Levan V Dadiani, Prince-regnant of Mingrelia, and member of the regency council for his nephew, Niko I Dadiani. As an officer in the Imperial Russian service, he took part in the Russo-Turkish, Crimean, and Caucasus wars, and retired with the rank of General of the Infantry. He was also a literature enthusiast and himself a poet of some talent, writing in the spirit of Georgian Romanticism under the pen name of Kolkhideli (კოლხიდელი, "Colchian").

== Family ==
Grigol Dadiani was the second son of Levan V Dadiani, ruler of Mingrelia—then an autonomous principality within the Russian Empire—and his second wife, Princess Marta Tsereteli. He was, thus, a younger brother of David Dadiani, the penultimate prince-regnant of Mingrelia, and uncle to Niko Dadiani, the last to hold that office.

Dadiani married at St. Petersburg, in 1843, to Princess Therese Gurieli (1825 – 24 March 1871), daughter of Mamia V Gurieli, Prince of Guria by his wife, Princess Sophia Tsulukidze (d. 1829). She was educated at St. Petersburg and served at the Imperial court. She followed her husband to Georgia, where she became involved in many charities, earning the Small Cross of the Order of Saint Catherine from Alexander II of Russia during his visit to Kutaisi in 1861. She died at the age of 47 and was buried at the Martvili Monastery. The couple had no children.

== Military career ==
Grigol Dadiani was enlisted in the Imperial Russian Page Corps in 1828 and took part in the war against the Ottoman Empire in 1829. He then served with his father until 1834, when he was commissioned as a poruchik of the Life Guards Grenadier Regiment in St. Petersburg. In 1844, Dadiani, promoted to colonel, was enlisted in the Life Guards Preobrazhensky Regiment, but he continued his service in the Caucasus. Made major-general in 1854, he commanded the Mingrelian and Gurian militias, composed of local irregulars, against the Ottoman army in 1855 and 1856, during the Crimean War. In 1857, he was officially made a member of the His Imperial Majesty's Retinue. Dadiani commanded the 1st Brigade of the Caucasian Grenadier Division from 1858 and 1859 and took part in the storm of Gunib and capture of Imam Shamil during the Caucasian War. Dadiani was promoted to lieutenant-general in 1860 and, further following the Russo-Turkish War (1877–1878), on the occasion of the semi-centennial of his military service, to the rank of adjutant general in 1880. His final promotion, just prior to his retirement, was the rank of general of the infantry in 1883.

== Politics of Mingrelia ==
In 1853, after the death of his elder brother David, Grigol Dadiani became part of the regency council for his underage nephew, Niko. The council was presided by the dowager-princess Ekaterina and also included his younger brother, Konstantin Dadiani. Grigol Dadiani's relations with Princess Ekaterina were strained and he was accused by her sympathizers of political intrigues and stocking unrest among the Mingrelian peasants. A peasants revolt in 1857 seriously destabilized Mingrelia, leading to the Russian government to impose its direct administration and, finally, formally abolish princely rule in 1867.

== Literary interests and philanthropy ==
Dadiani was a founding member of the leading Georgian education charity Society for the Spreading of Literacy among Georgians in 1879. He was part of the commission studying the texts of the medieval Georgian epic The Knight in the Panther's Skin. He made donations to several schools and bequeathed his extensive library to the Society for the Spreading of Literacy. Dadiani composed his first poems while studying military in St. Petersburg. His poetry was mostly Romanticist and patriotic, influenced by that of Grigol Orbeliani. He mostly wrote under the pen name of Kolkhideli, "a Colchian".

== Death ==
Prince Gregory Dadiani died December 24, 1901 (Julian calendar) in Kutaisi, Georgia. He was buried at the Dadiani necropolis at the Martvili Monastery. His brother and rival, David Dadiani, filled his position.
