= Tariel =

Tariel may refer to:

- Tariel Bitsadze, Georgian karateka and mixed martial artist
- Tariel Dadiani, Prince of Mingrelia, Georgia in 1793–1794 and in 1802
- Tarieli Melelashvili, Georgian wrestler
- Tariel Vasadze, Ukrainian businessman
- Tariel Zharkymbaev, Kyrgyzstani cross-country skier
- Tariel Zintiridis, Greek judoka
- Prince Tariel from The Knight in the Panther's Skin
