= Chanturia =

Chanturia is a Georgian surname, which may refer to:

- Akaki Chanturia, (1881–1941), Georgian ethnographer
- Giorgi Chanturia, (1959–1994), Georgian politician
- Vladimer Chanturia, Georgian boxer
- Grigol Chanturia (born 1973), Georgian footballer
- Giorgi Chanturia (footballer), Georgian footballer
- Irine Sarishvili-Chanturia, Georgian politician
