= Nino, Princess of Mingrelia =

Princess of Mingrelia

Nino
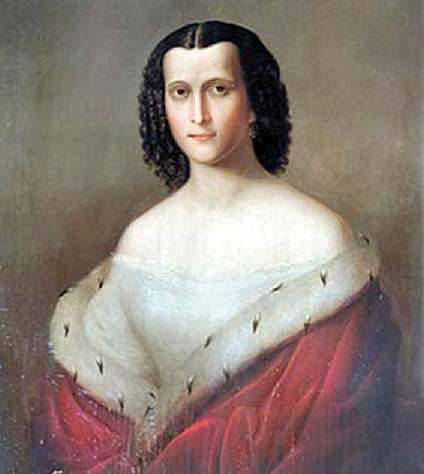

Princess of Mingrelia
- Tenure: 1791/94–1802; 1802–1804
- Born: 15 April 1772; Tiflis, Kingdom of Kartli-Kakheti
- Died: 30 May 1847 (aged 75); Saint Petersburg, Russian Empire
- Burial: Church of St. John Chrysostom, Alexander Nevsky Lavra
- Spouse: Grigol Dadiani
- Issue among others...: Levan V Dadiani
- Dynasty: Bagrationi dynasty
- Father: George XII
- Mother: Ketevan Andronikashvili
- Religion: Georgian Orthodox Church

Nino (Georgian: ნინო; 15 April 1772 – 30 May 1847) was a Georgian princess royal (batonishvili) as a daughter of King George XII and princess consort of Mingrelia as the wife of Grigol Dadiani, Sovereign Prince of Mingrelia. After the death of her husband in 1804, Nino was a regent for her underage son, Levan until 1811, and helped bring Mingrelia and Abkhazia, a neighboring principality of her in-laws, under the hegemony of the Russian Empire. In 1811, she retired to Saint Petersburg, where she died at the age of 75.

== Early life ==
Princess Nino was born in Tbilisi as the sixth child of then-Crown Prince George and his first wife, Ketevan Andronikashvili, in 1772, in the lifetime of her reigning grandfather, Heraclius II of Georgia. In 1791, at the age of 19, Nino was married off to Grigol Dadiani, Prince of Mingrelia. Around the same time, Grigol's sister Mariam wed Nino's cousin, King Solomon II of Imereti. These marriages were intended to cement an alliance of the Georgian potentates which had been concluded through the efforts of Heraclius II's minister Solomon Lionidze in June 1790. The relations between Solomon and Grigol quickly became soured over their territorial disputes and, in the period of 1791–1802, Grigol thrice lost throne to Solomon's protégés. Grigol and Nino sought and obtained the protection from the Russian Empire, which had taken over the kingdom of Nino's late father in 1801 and eyed Imereti. By the treaty of 1 December 1803 Mingrelia became part of the Russian Empire as an autonomous principality. On this occasion, Nino received a sable fur coat and ten arshins (7.1 m or 23.3 ft) of crimson velvet as the imperial gifts.

== Regency ==
Upon Grigol Dadiani's sudden death on 23 October 1804, Princess Nino became more prominently involved in the politics of Mingrelia. She immediately accused the rival nobles of having poisoned the prince and requested from the Russian commander in Georgia, Prince Pavel Tsitsianov, to have an inquiry into her husband's murder. On 3 November 1804 the Russian government recognized her as the ruler (pravitselnitsa) of Mingrelia and confirmed her as a regent until her 12-year-old son Levan would reach 20. Levan had been held since 1802 as a hostage by Kelesh Ahmed-Bey Shervashidze, Prince of Abkhazia, in return for his help to Grigol in the power struggle in Mingrelia. In March 1805 the Russian troops moved into Abkhazia, restored the fort of Anaklia to Mingrelia, and rescued Levan.

The regency council under the presidency of Princess Nino also included Prince Niko Dadiani, Bishop Besarion of Chkondidi, the palace majordomo Giorgi Chikovani, and Prince Beri Gelovani, the lord of Lechkhumi. Nino's relations with Niko Dadiani, a highly influential nobleman, and Beri Gelovani, her in-law, were strained. The opponents accused Nino of political machinations and using the council to further her own ends. Furthermore, she was rumored to have been behind the murder of Prince Grigol, who had been briefly involved with a woman of the Chichua family. These power struggles would continue throughout the period of regency.

Princess Nino followed the pro-Russian policy of her late husband. During the Russo-Turkish war of 1806–12, she took command of the Mingrelian troops which joined the Russians in capturing the Black Sea fortress of Poti from the Ottoman forces in 1809. In 1810, Nino sent 1,000 soldiers to the aid of her Abkhazian protégé, Sefer Ali-Bey Shervashidze, who deposed his pro-Ottoman brother, Prince Aslan-Bey, and brought Abkhazia under the Russian protectorate.

== Retirement to Russia ==
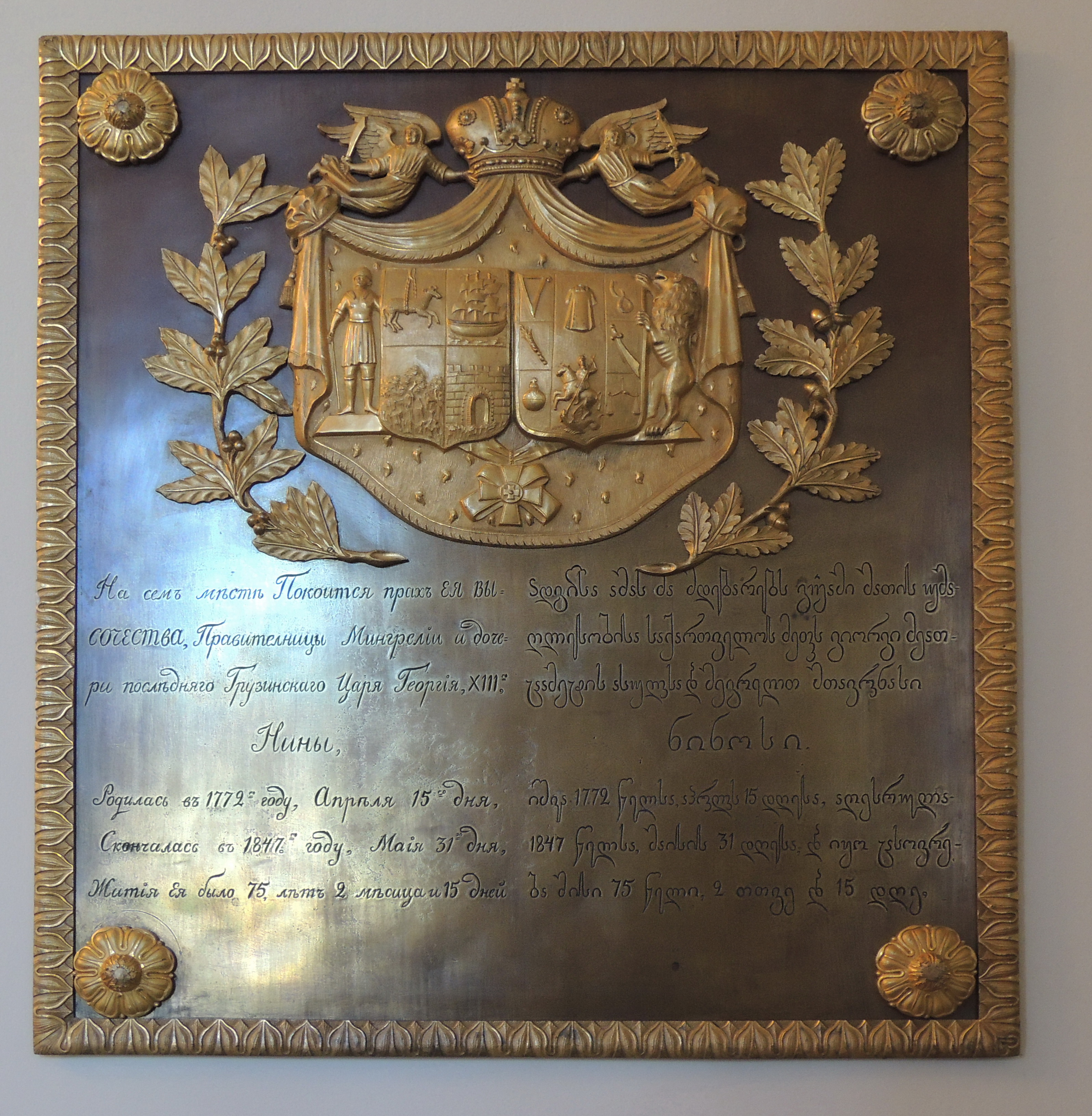
Princess Nino's grave plate at the Blagoveschenskaya Church of Alexander Nevsky Lavra

In 1811, Nino was sidelined from the government of Mingrelia. She was recalled to St. Petersburg, where she was appointed a statsdame and decorated with the Grand Cross of the Order of St. Catherine. Her younger son, Giorgi, and the Abkhazian heir, Dimitri, accompanied her to the imperial capital and were enlisted in the Cadet Corps for military education. Early in 1820, when Nino was vacationing at Georgiyevsk, Giorgi fell under the suspicion of collaborating with the rebels in Imereti, whom his elder brother, Levan, fought in the Russian ranks. Nino was escorted to Ryazan, but she was later allowed to return to St. Petersburg, where she spent the rest of her life and died on 31 May 1847. She was interred at the Church of St. John Chrysostom, Alexander Nevsky Lavra.

Princess Nino's only surviving portrait, produced by an unknown artist during her St. Petersburg years, was purchased in 2010 by the Australian entrepreneur Victor Greenwich Dadianov, a scion of the Dadiani dynasty and Honorary Consul-General of Georgia in Sydney, at one of the auctions of Europe, and was presented by him to the Dadiani Palaces Museum in Zugdidi, Georgia.

== Children ==
Prince Grigol and Princess Nino had six children, two sons and four daughters:

- Ketevan (born 1792), who married first Manuchar Shervashidze, Prince of Samurzakano (died 1813), and then, in 1823, Rostom-Bey, son of Kelesh Ahmed-Bey Shervashidze, Prince of Abkhazia. A grandson of her first marriage was Prince Giorgi Shervashidze (1847–1918), Governor of Tiflis, known for his persecution of the doukhobors in 1895.
- Levan V Dadiani (1793–1846), Sovereign Prince of Mingrelia (1804–1840).
- Mariam (born 1794), who was married firstly to Prince Giorgi Eristavi of Guria and secondly, c. 1810, to Prince Rostom (Tato), son of Beri Gelovani, Lord of Lechkhumi.
- Elene (born 1795), who was married firstly to Prince David Gurieli (died 1833), son of Giorgi V Gurieli, and secondly to Prince Giorgi Mikeladze.
- Ekaterine (born 1797), who married in 1810 Colonel Prince Beglar (Petre) Jambakur-Orbeliani (1776–1819), son of Prince Zaal Orbeliani.
- Giorgi (1798–c. 1851), Major-General of the Russian army. He married, at Ryazan in 1839, Countess Elizaveta Pahlena, daughter of General Count Pavel Pahlen, and had no issue.

== Ancestry ==
Ancestors of Nino, Princess of Mingrelia

16. Heraclius I of Kakheti
8. Teimuraz II
17. Ana Cholokashvili
4. Heraclius II of Georgia
18. Vakhtang VI
9. Tamar of Kartli
19. Rusudan of Circassia
2. George XII
20. Zurab Abashidze
10. Zaal Abashidze
5. Anna Abashidze
1. Nino
24. Melkisedek Andronikashvili
12. Iese Andronikashvili
6. Papuna Andronikashvili
3. Ketevan Andronikashvili
