= Lazika (planned city) =

Lazika ლაზიკა
- Proposed planned city
- Lazika proposed city plan

- Proposed location in Georgia
- Coordinates: 42°19′18″N 41°37′19″E
- Country: Georgia
- Mkhare: Samegrelo-Zemo Svaneti

Lazika (Georgian: ლაზიკა) is a proposed planned city in Georgia, on the country’s Black Sea littoral, named after the ancient kingdom of Lazica. Proposed in 2011 by the-then President of Georgia, Mikheil Saakashvili, it was to be built south to Anaklia—a sea resort immediately south to breakaway Abkhazia—and north to Kulevi, a port north to Poti, Georgia's key Black Sea port city. The project was largely abandoned after the change of government in Georgia in 2012.

== Proposed city ==
An intent to construct a new large settlement, with the potential to make the city into the country's second largest—after the capital of Tbilisi—and a major economic hub of western Georgia, was unveiled by President Mikheil Saakashvili on December 4, 2011. The name "Lazika" is a reference to the Greco-Roman designation of this region, a part of ancient Colchis. According to Saakashvili, the construction would be launched in 2012 and the government of Georgia had already been in talks with several large investment groups in Asia and Europe. Several politicians and commentators have been skeptical of the project. Critics have also pointed out to the potential harm to the flora and fauna of the Kolkheti National Park, which lies adjacent to the area. The NDI-sponsored public opinion polls in 2012 showed support for the construction of the city.

Lazika was intended to have a special legal status, with the English law model for commercial transactions instead of a codified civil law established in Georgia. To this end, the Parliament of Georgia passed, on June 29, 2012, a constitutional amendment that would allow the lawmakers to adopt a law concerning the future status of Lazika.

On September 24, 2012, President Saakashvili inaugurated the first building, that of the city's administration, in the projected territory of Lazika and unveiled several other projects.

== Abandoning the project ==
In October 2012, after the defeat of Saakashvili's party to the Georgian Dream coalition in the parliamentary election, the incoming Prime Minister Bidzina Ivanishvili said that construction of Lazika was not feasible. This was also confirmed by Kakha Kaladze, Minister of Energy and Natural Resources. The project has fallen silent since then, but the new government confirmed their intention to build the Anaklia port in the vicinity of the would-be city of Lazika.

== See also ==
- Samegrelo-Zemo Svaneti
