= Konstantin Dadiani =

General, nobleman Konstantin Dadiani
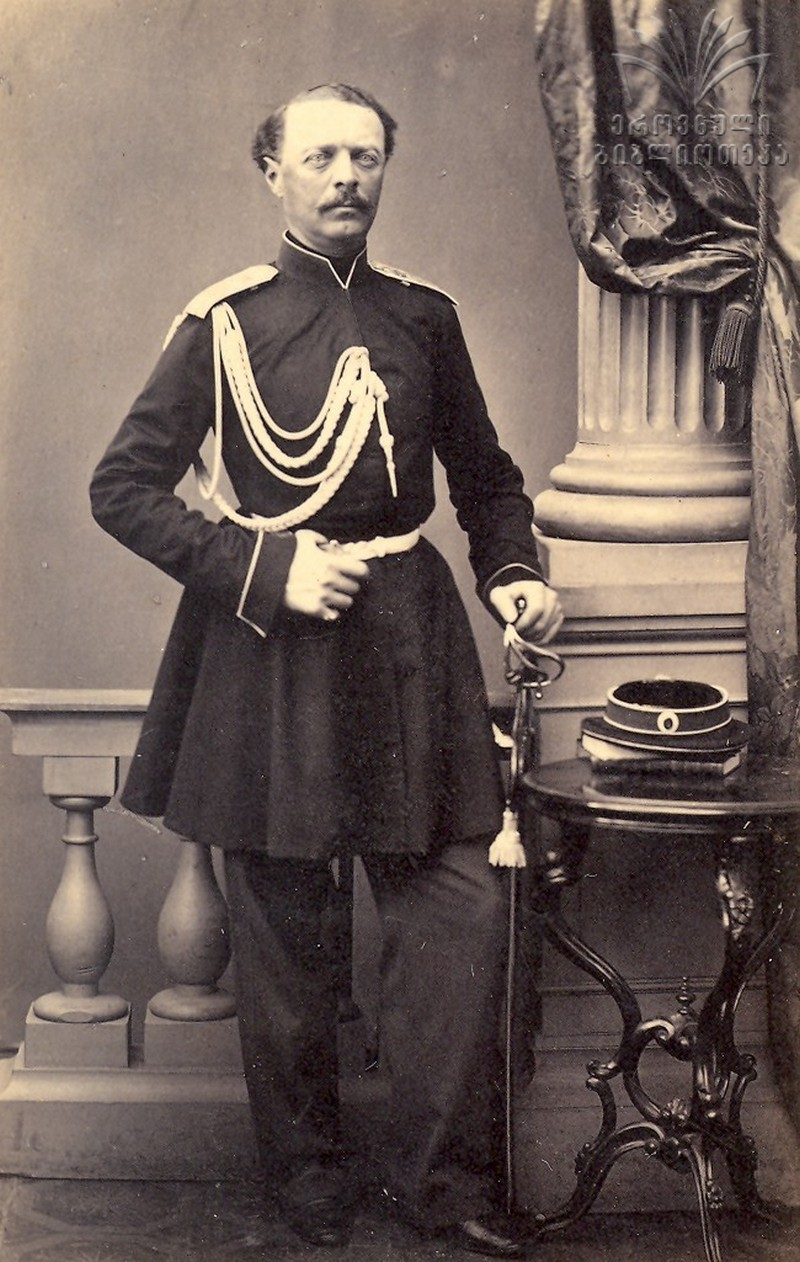
- General Dadiani
- Born: 18 October 1819
- Died: 25 April 1889
- Military career
- Allegiance: Russian Empire
- Branch: Imperial Russian Army
- Service years: 1839–1887
- Rank: Lieutenant general
- Conflicts: Caucasian War; Crimean War; Russo-Turkish War

Prince Konstantin Dadiani (Georgian: კონსტანტინე დადიანი, Russian: Константин Леванович Дадиани; 18 October 1819 – 25 April 1889) was a Georgian nobleman of the House of Dadiani and general of the Russian Imperial Army. During his nearly four-decade long military career, he fought in the Caucasian, Crimean, and Turkish wars.

== Caucasus mountains ==
Prince Dadiani was the third son of Levan V Dadiani, Prince of Mingrelia, and his wife, Princess Marta, née Tsereteli. In 1839, he graduated from St. Petersburg Page Corps and was commissioned as a khorunzhy in a Cossack regiment. Assigned to the Caucasian Corps in 1842, Dadiani fought in the Caucasian War against the mountaineers of Dagestan in 1844 and Chechnya from 1846 to 1848. He particularly distinguished himself in putting down a rebellion in Samurzakano in 1849, winning the Order of St. Vladimir, 4th Class. In August 1853, he was fighting again in Chechnya, when the death of his brother, David, Prince of Mingrelia, compelled Konstantin Dadiani to return to Mingrelia to become part of the regency council for his underage nephew Niko presided by David's widow Princess Ekaterina.

== Crimean War ==
Dadiani's return to Mingrelia coincided with the outbreak of the Crimean War, followed by landing of the Ottoman troops in Mingrelia in May 1854. He assumed command of a Mingrelian militia and engaged the superior Ottoman forces at Koki and Kokati on 25 October 1854. With the Ottoman advance, the Russian regular troops retreated from Mingrelia and parts of Mingrelian militia deserted their ranks. Dadiani, with a remaining force, moved to the highlands to protect the family of his late brother. After the Ottoman withdrawal, Konstantin Dadiani marshaled his militia again and joined the Guria detachment in its operations against the Ottoman forces.

== Later career ==
During a peasant revolt in Mingrelia in 1857, Konstantin Dadiani and his brother, Grigory, were recalled to Tiflis, while Ekaterina was summoned to St. Petersburg. Thus, the regency was sidelined from Mingrelia's government and its autonomy was effectively abrogated. The family accepted the accomplished fact; both Konstantin and Grigory remained in the imperial service. The former was made aide-de-camp to the Tsar Alexander II in 1858 and promoted to major-general in 1866. During the 1877–1878 war with the Ottoman Empire, Dadiani commanded a unit operating on the eastern Black Sea coastline to block Ottoman landings. On 15 June 1877, he was wounded during bombardment by a squadron of Ottoman warships. After the war, Dadiani was promoted to lieutenant-general and enlisted in reserves of the Caucasian Army. In 1887, he served as an arbiter in the Senaki uyezd.
