= House of Chichua =

Georgian noble family

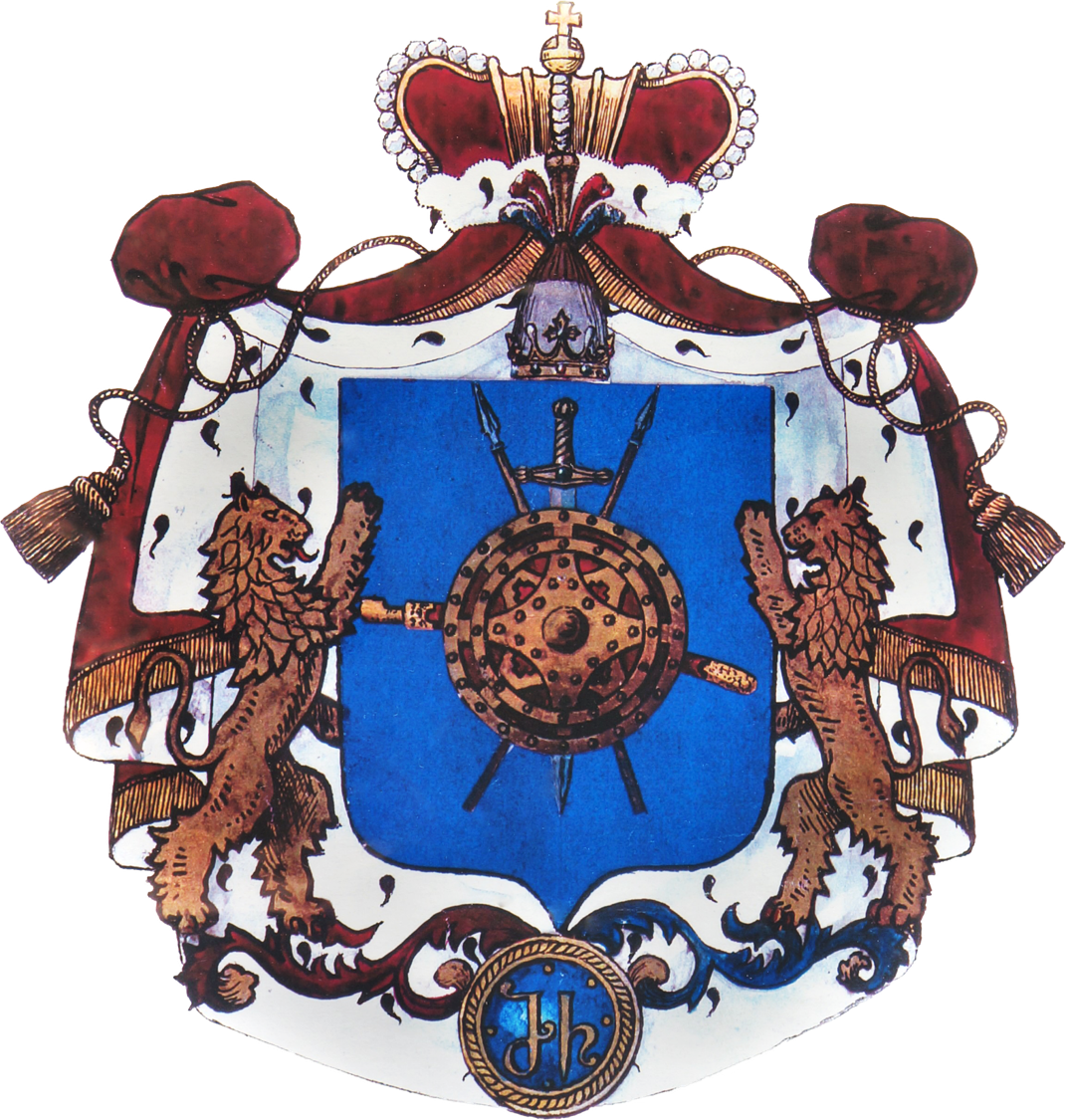
House of Chichua Crest

The House of Chichua (Georgian: ჩიჩუა, romanized: chichua) was a Georgian noble family, commanders, and princes in Samegrelo (Mingrelia) or Odishi.

Historians have different view points about who were the ancestors of Chichua. Some sources state that the family is descended from the House of Chikovani, some state that the family is descended from a man named Chija and hence the surname Chichua, and more precise and factual sources say that they are descended from House of Kakhaberidze, while sharing the same roots as the House of Chijavadze.

== Possessions ==
The House of Chichua was a prominent noble house in the Mingrelian nobility. Historical sources about the early ancestors of this family first appear in the first half of the 17th century. During the rule of prince Levan II Dadiani (1611-1657) the first member of House of Chichua appeared by the name of Ramaz Chichua and during this time he was the head of his house.

Princedom of House of Chichua appears from the beginning of the 17th century. Their princedom, Sachichuo which occupied the present Municipality of Khobi and included towns: Zubi, Japshakari, Zeni, Sajijao, Kheta, etc.

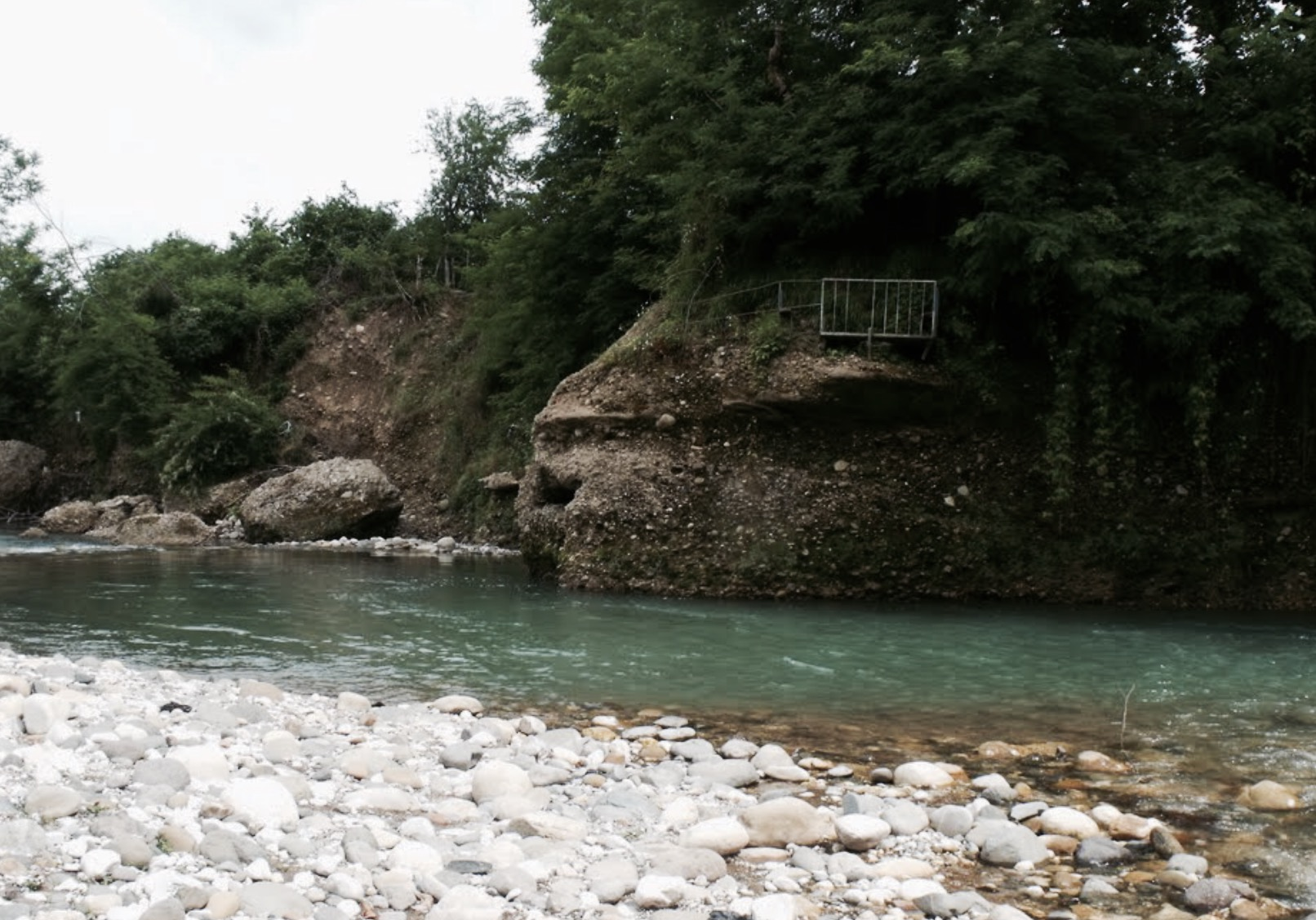
Chanistskali (ჭანისწყალი) River

Their princedom's borders to the east ended at the town of Zana, to the south - at the town of Khorshi, to the north - at the town of Khibula and the western border was made up by the river of Chanistskali. Other than the above listed towns, the House of Chichua also possessed the towns of Narazeni, Bia, Sakharbedio, Teklati, Kvaloni and Mukhuri. Their residence was located in Zeni, where they had a keep, a church and a hereditary castle. Their hereditary chamber was located in a church in the town of Zeni and in the monastery of Khobi. They also had another hereditary castle located in Zubi.

The Aznauri (or lesser nobles) of the House of Chichua were: Gvatua, Jorjikia, Lolua and Khocholava, and their peasants were: Beraia, Gvalia, Gvasalia, Gersamia, Jruburia, Kuchava, Nadaraia, Papaskiri, Sigua, Chanturia, Chilaia, Chikhvaria and others. The House of Chichua had their place in the administrative apparatus. From the late documents, it is revealed that the Castellan and Mouravi of the castles of House of Chichua were the Aznauri Gvatua and masters of the castles were peasants Gvasalia.

=== Influence ===
Prince Pepuna Chichua held a massive influence in Mingrelian nobility. Because of this King Alexander V of Imereti (1720-1752) wanted his house, the House of Bagrationi, to intermarry with House of Chichua. Pepuna Chichua had inherited the title of Grand Master of the Court (sakhlt-ukhutsesi), which was the highest ranking title after the Dadiani in Mingrelia since 18th century. Therefore, Pepuna could have made the relationships tense between the King of Imereti and Prince of Mingrelia. Pepuna Chichua was engaged with the daughter of Eristavi (duke) of Ksani, but the King of Imereti canceled their marriage and instead married off her sister to Pepuna Chichua, but the king's original plan - which was to strengthen his authority in Mingrelia - failed, because Otia Dadiani helped Giorgi who was exiled in Mingrelia because of his earlier attempt to take the Throne of Imereti in 1741.

Princedom of Chichua expended even more during the rule of Otia Dadiani who granted Papuna Chichua large estates, castles and peasants from the Episcopal (Saepiskoposo) of Caishi. After the death of Pepuna, the head of the house became his son Giorgi, whose wife was the sister of the head (Mtavari) of Abkhazia by the name of Keleshbeia Shervashidze. From the second half of the 18th century grandchildren of Pepuna Chichua are revealed - Khakhu and Kacia.

From the beginning of the rule of Pepuna, House of Chichua excelled on the court of Minrgelia. But soon in the fight for supremacy the House of Chikovani got involved. In 1768, Prince of Mingrelia - Katsia II Dadiani returned the estates of Episcopal of Caishi back to the church and in 1777, Kacia II named Giorgi Chikovani the Metropolitan of Caishi. In return for the Episcopal of Caishi, Kacia gave House of Chichua other estates.

During the Russian-Turkish war in 1768–1774, prince Khakhu Chichua helped the Turkish garrison camped in the fortress of Poti by providing firepower and food. Because of this help, Turks expelled General Sukhotina's Russian-Georgian army and defended the fortress. By the command of General Sukhotina, Khakhu Chichua was arrested and exiled from Georgia and was sent to Russia. But on the road, near Mozdok, in 1772 he died.

In 1777, Kacia II Dadiani, took away the title of Grand Master of the Court from House of Chichua and gave it to House of Chikovani. In the beginning of the 18th century House of Chichua again gained a dominant influence in Mingrelia. House of Chikovani could not do their duties as Grand Masters of the Court and had to abdicate and in 1810 the Grand Master of the Court became Giorgi Chichua, being the head of his house and son of Khakhu Chichua.

Relative of Giorgi Chichua, Prince Levan Chichua appears in the highest nobility of Grigoria Dadiani's (1788-1804) widow Nino, who was the daughter of King Giorgi XII of Kartli-Kakheti (1798-1800). Nino at that time, in 1811 visited Petersburg. Other relative of Giorgi Chichua, Khakhu Chichua, after the death of Giorgi, took the hereditary title of Grand Master of the Court, became the head of Chichua and at the same time held the title of the Commander (მთავარსარდალი) of the Mingrelian army, reaching the peak of power for House of Chichua.

After accumulating both of these titles, Khakhu Chichua became the most influential noble in the court of Mingrelia. He preserved his both positions until his death in 1825. After him his titles were inherited by Prince Levan Chichua.

== Decline ==
In 1838, Prince Levan V Dadiani ultimately took away, from House of Chichua the title of Grand Master of the Court and gave it to House of Chikovani. At this House of Chichua went into rebellion with 3000 armed soldiers, but their objective was not reached.

The House of Chichua with all the other nobles in Mingrelia became part of the Russian Nobility with the final incorporation in the Russian Empire of Mingrelia and Kingdom of Imereti.
