= Levan V Dadiani =

Prince of Mingrelia

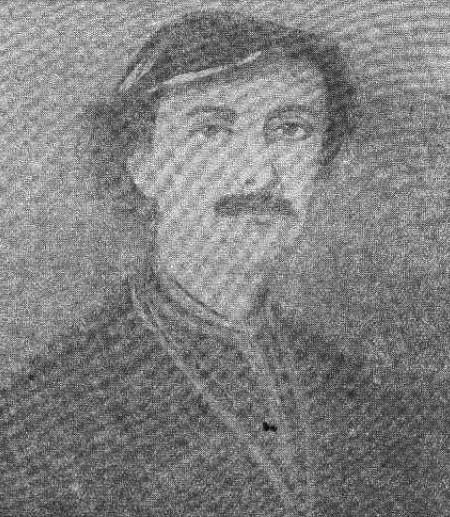
- Levan V Dadiani.

Prince of Mingrelia
- Reign: 1804–1846
- Predecessor: Grigol Dadiani
- Successor: David Dadiani
- Born: 1793; Chkaduashi, near Zugdidi
- Died: 1846 (aged 52–53)
- Burial: Martvili Monastery
- Spouse: Nino Tsereteli (m. 1810; died 1811) Marta Tsereteli (m. 1811; div. 1839)
- Issue: David Dadiani; Grigol; Nino; Konstantin; Ekaterine
- House: Dadiani
- Father: Grigol Dadiani
- Mother: Nino Bagrationi
- Religion: Georgian Orthodox Church

Levan V Dadiani (Georgian: ლევან V დადიანი; 1793 – 30 July 1846), of the House of Dadiani, was Prince of Mingrelia, in western Georgia, from 1804 to 1846. Succeeding on the death of his father Grigol Dadiani, he ruled—initially under the regency of his mother Nino from 1804 to 1811—as a loyal subject of the Russian Empire. Levan Dadiani took little interest in the details of government and resigned in favor of his son, David Dadiani, in 1840, remaining a titular Prince of Mingrelia until his death.

== Early life and rule ==
Levan Dadiani was the eldest son of Grigol Dadiani, Prince of Mingrelia, and his wife, Nino, daughter of George XII, the last king of Georgia. Grigol died in October 1804, having placed his principality under the Russian suzerainty several months before. The Russian government confirmed, in absentia, the boy-prince Levan as Grigol's successor. At that time, Levan resided in Abkhazia, at the court of Kelesh Ahmed-Bey Shervashidze, whom Grigol had surrendered his son as an honorary hostage in exchange of the Abkhaz support in a power struggle in Mingrelia in 1802. The Russian military intervention, in April 1805, freed Levan, who, on his arrival in Mingrelia, took a solemn oath of fealty to the Russian monarchy and was confirmed as Prince of Mingrelia, receiving, on this occasion, the rank of major-general and Order of Saint Anna, 1st Class, in July 1805. Levan's accession was opposed by his uncle, Manuchar II Dadiani, but the power struggle was eventually won by Levan's loyalists through the efforts of his mother Nino and the archbishop of Chqondidi.

== In Russian service ==
As Levan was underage at his accession, the regency council presided by his mother was established. The council was ridden with internal tensions; Princess Nino was sidelined from the government and Levan assumed full ruling powers in 1811. He championed Russian interests in the region and took part, at the head of Mingrelian forces ("militia"), in Russian military campaigns. At the age of 16, he was present at the successful siege of Poti, in 1809, during the war against the Ottoman Empire. Next year, he aided the Russians in the conquest of the Kingdom of Imereti, which had, for centuries, claimed suzerainty over Mingrelia, and in an expedition against the Ottoman-held province of Akhaltsikhe, for which he received the Order of Saint Vladimir, 2nd Class.

Levan was also instrumental in extending Russian influence into Abkhazia, where he supported his relative, Prince Sefer Ali-Bey Sharvashidze. He took control of Samurzakano, a borderland between Mingrelia and Abkhazia, in 1813 and campaigned with a Mingrelian force in Abkhazia's interior in 1818 and 1824. In 1819 and 1820, Dadiani joined the Russian forces fighting the rebels in Imereti and Guria. Levan's younger brother Giorgi, also an officer in the Russian service, collaborated with the rebels, and was handed over by the Prince of Mingrelia to the Russian authorities. In August 1829, during the Russo-Turkish War (1828–1829), Dadiani and his Mingrelians, serving under Major-General Karl Hesse, were instrumental in defeating the Turks at Mukha-Estate. For his services, Levan Dadiani was made lieutenant-general in 1820 and granted the Order of Saint Alexander Nevsky in 1830.

== Mingrelian state of affairs ==
Levan Dadiani's rule was autocratic. Personally, he was devoted to hunting and had little interest in the administrative affairs of his principality, which he had effectively relegated to his relative Didi-Niko Dadiani until the latter died in 1834. He still helped establish a school at the Martvili Monastery in 1830. Levan, anticipating riches by selling timber to Egypt, dreamed of turning Zugdidi, Mingrelia's chief town, into a modern city called Grigoriopolis and filed a request to the tsar Nicholas I to be allowed to do so in 1837, a few months after he hosted the Russian monarch in his possessions in September 1837. Nicholas I ruled the place could be named Grigoriopolis to appease Dadiani, but withheld his approval to grant to it a city status.

After Niko Dadiani's death in 1834, Levan summoned his eldest son David, an energetic and educated officer in the Russian service in Tbilisi, to manage a growing political crisis in the principality. David's efforts at modernization were not popular with the local nobility and even his father, causing the disillusioned young prince to retire from Mingrelia in 1838. With his health declining and Mingrelia facing a breakdown of law and order, Levan Dadiani resigned government duties in favor of David on 11 May 1840, retaining formal titles of a Mingrelian ruler. He died six years later in Zugdidi and was buried at the Martvili Monastery.

== Family ==
Levan Dadiani was married twice. He wed first, in 1810, Princess Nino (died 1811), daughter of Prince Zurab Tsereteli (1747–1823), Mayor of the Palace (sakhlt-ukhutsesi) of Imereti. Levan's second wife was his late consort's younger sister Marta (died 1839), mother of his three sons and two daughters.

- David Dadiani (1812–1853), Prince of Mingrelia (1840–1853), major-general;
- Grigol (Kolkhideli) (1814–1901), general of the infantry and a poet;
- Nino (1816–1886), Lady-in-waiting of the Imperial Court of Russia. She married in 1836 Prince Ivane Bagration of Mukhrani;
- Konstantin (1819–1889), lieutenant-general;
- Ekaterine (1821–1858), who married in 1833 Prince Dimitri (Seit-Bey) Shervashidze. They were the parents of Giorgi Shervashidze (1847–1918), Governor of Tiflis (1889–1897).

== Notes ==
Levan V Dadiani House of Dadiani Born: 1793 Died: 30 July 1846
Regnal titles
Preceded by Grigol Dadiani	Prince of Mingrelia; 1804–1846	Succeeded by David Dadiani
