= Anaklia =

Anaklia ანაკლია
- Town
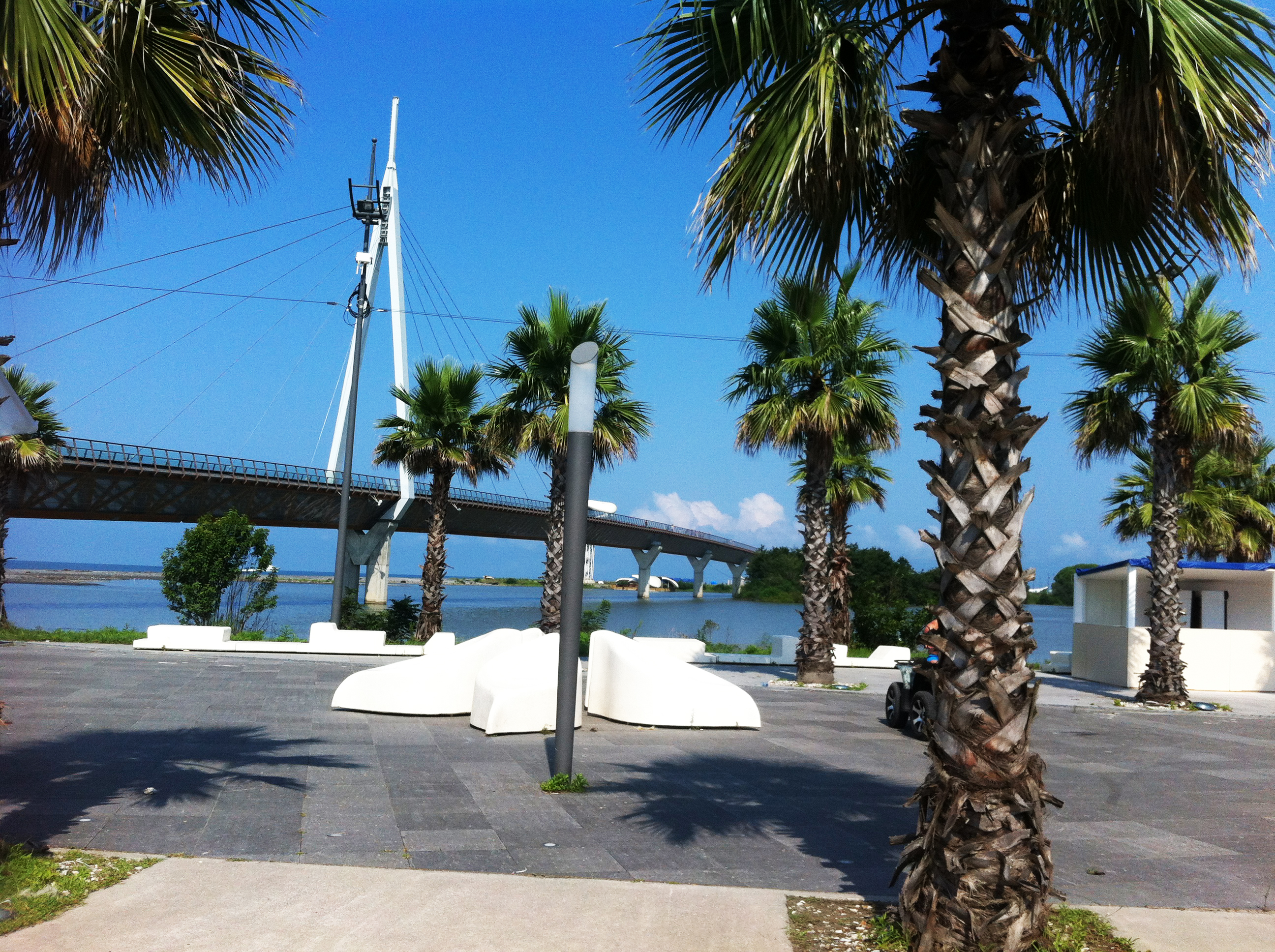
- The Golden Fleece Hotel, as viewed from the Anaklia-Ganmukhuri Pedestrian Bridge

- Location in Georgia Anaklia (Samegrelo-Zemo Svaneti)
- Coordinates: 42°23′37″N 41°34′09″E
- Country: (Georgia (country)) Georgia
- Region: Samegrelo-Zemo Svaneti
- District: Zugdidi
- Elevation: 3 m (9.8 ft)

Population (2014)
  - Total: 1,331
- Time zone: UTC+4 (Georgian Time)

Anaklia (Georgian: ანაკლია) is a town and seaside resort in western Georgia. It is located in the Samegrelo-Zemo Svaneti region, at the place where the Enguri River flows into the Black Sea.

== History ==
The earliest settlement on Anaklia's territory dates back to the mid-Bronze Age and is typical to the Colchian culture. It is the Classical Heraclea of Colchis, Anaclia of later authors, and Anarghia of Archangelo Lamberti and Jean Chardin (both the 17th-century travelers). After the fragmentation of the Kingdom of Georgia in the 15th century, it was an important fortified town, sea port and fishing station within the Principality of Mingrelia. In 1723, the town was captured by the Ottoman Empire and converted into its maritime outpost and slave-trading locale. Western Georgian kingdom of Imereti regained control over Anaklia in 1770, seizing the opportunity of Ottoman Empire being at war with Russia (Russo-Turkish War (1768–1774)). Solomon I, the king of Imereti, was supposed to be supported in this endeavor by a small Russian contingent under General Totleben, but the Russian troops retreated before a clash against the Turks.

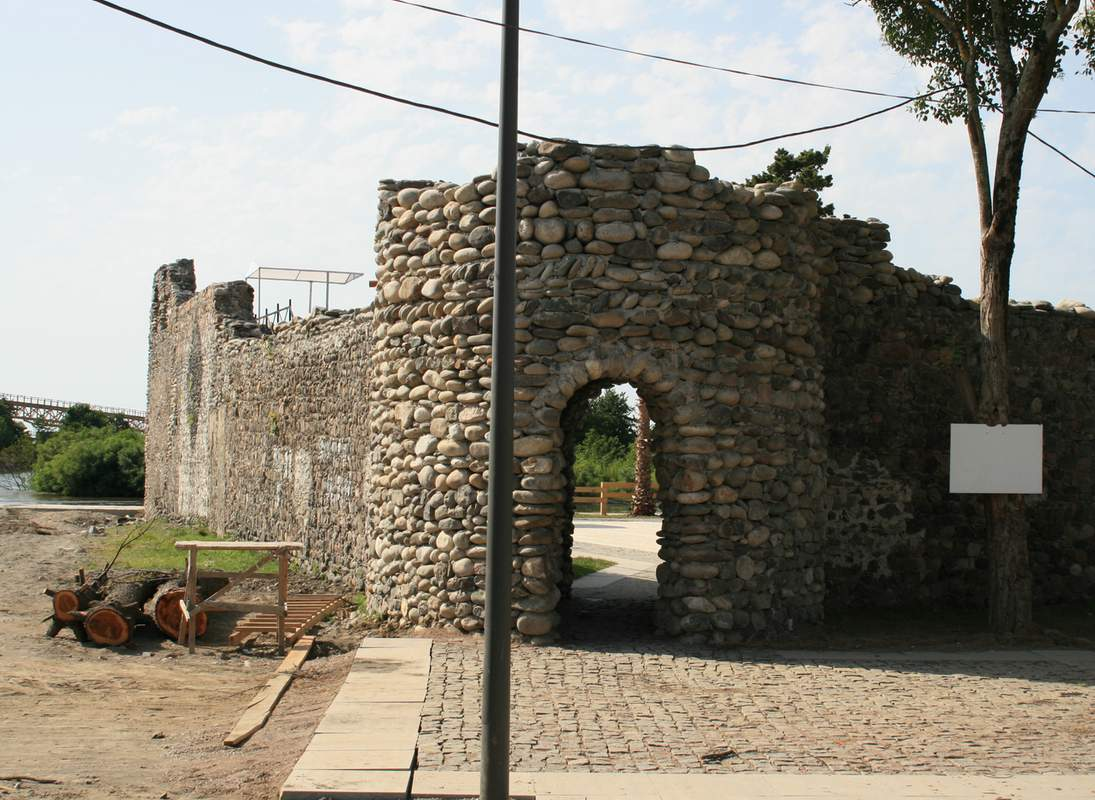
Ruins of the Anaklia fort

In 1802, Kelesh-Bey Sharvashidze, the pro-Turkish ruler of the neighboring Principality of Abkhazia, capitalized on the internecine feuds in Mingrelia, and forced Prince Grigol Dadiani of Mingrelia into surrendering Anaklia, taking Grigol’s son and heir, Levan, as a hostage. When Mingrelia accepted the Russian protectorate in 1803, the Russian commander in Georgia, Prince Tsitsianov, demanded that Kelesh-Bey release Levan. On his refusal, Tsitsianov sent Major General Ion Rykgof into Abkhazia. In March 1805, the Russians took hold of Anaklia and threatened to march against Sukhum-Kaleh, forcing the Abkhazian prince to release Dadiani. The capture of Anaklia drew an Ottoman protest, however, and Tsitsianov hastened to disavow his subordinate and even apologize for his action, removing a Russian garrison from Anaklia. However, the incident added to an increasing tension between the two empires. When the next Russo-Turkish War broke out in 1806, the Russian forces restored Redoubt Kali and Anaklia to the Mingrelian prince Levan who would later relinquish the control of these forts to the Russian administration. In the 1850s, Anaklia was a small but strongly fortified seaport, which had a custom-house and carried on a considerable trade with Turkey. It had extensive suburbs, consisting of detached houses inhabited by Greeks, Jews, and Armenians. The population was around 600.

Subsequently, the importance of the Anaklia port significantly reduced, but it remained a minor Black Sea Fleet base in the Soviet times.

After the War in Abkhazia (1992–93), a Russian peacekeeping post was opened at Anaklia in 1994. In 2006, the Ministry of Defense of Georgia reported numerous damages inflicted by the Russian soldiers upon the 17th-century fortress of Anaklia and accused the peacekeepers of installing latrines and baths within the walls of the fort. Following a series of protests by the Georgians, the Russian military post was withdrawn in July 2007.

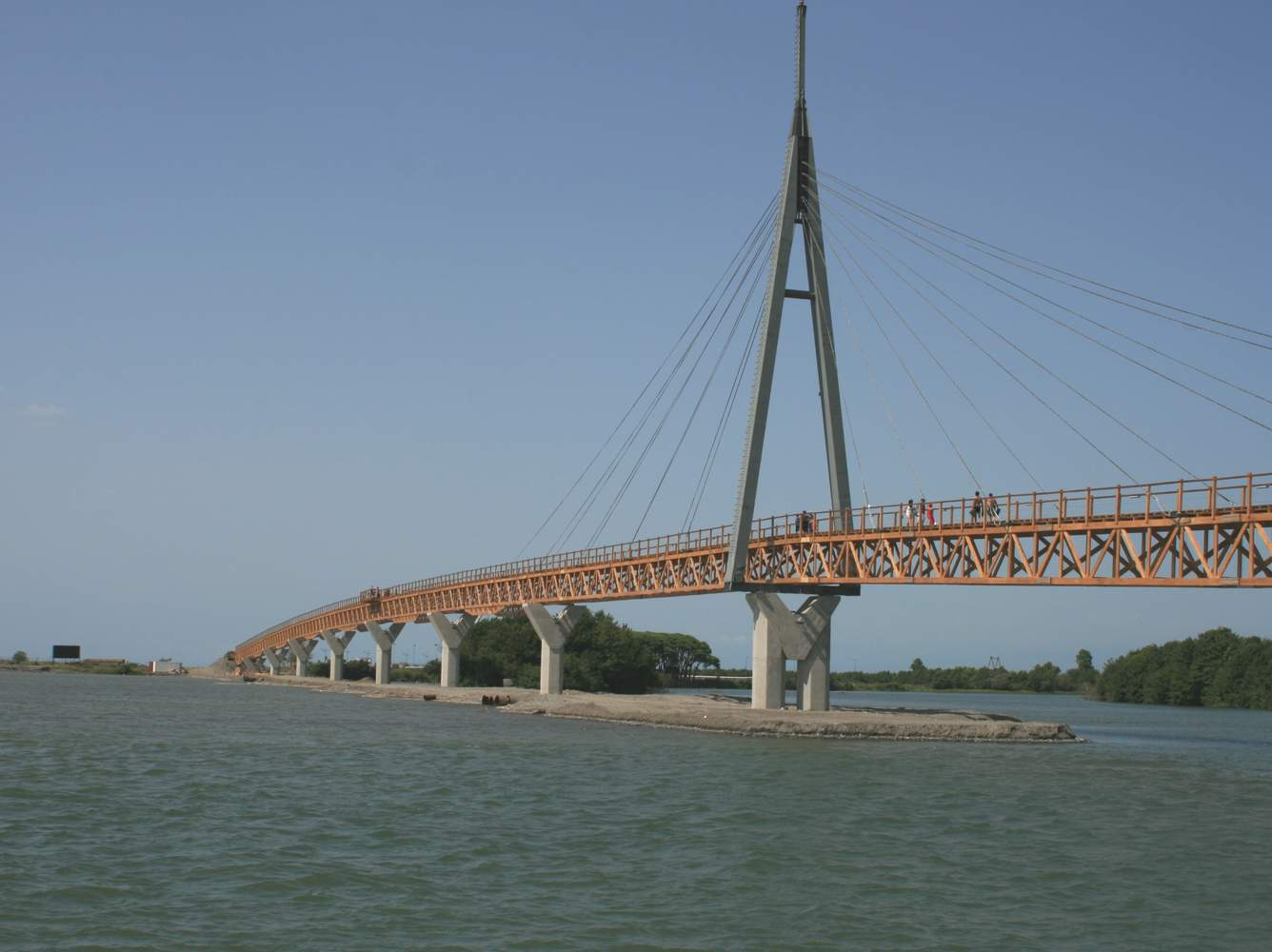
Anaklia-Ganmukhuri Pedestrian Bridge

A monument has been erected in Anaklia on May 21, 2012, commemorating Russia's expulsion of the Circassian people from the region following the conclusion of the Caucasian War in the 1860s. The May 21 date was chosen to coincide with the day on which the Circassian people themselves commemorate the expulsion, which the Georgian government has recognized as an act of genocide. The monument was designed by Khusen Kochesokov, a sculptor from the North Caucasus region of Kabardino-Balkaria.

== Resort ==
Anaklia is the seaside resort. Some of the greatest hotels were built in this village. The resort is connected with the village Ganmukhuri with the help of 552-metre flying bridge. Kazantip, the electronic music festival was held in Anaklia in 2014, but it was cancelled and GEM Fest electronic music festival has been taking place here since 2015.

== Location ==
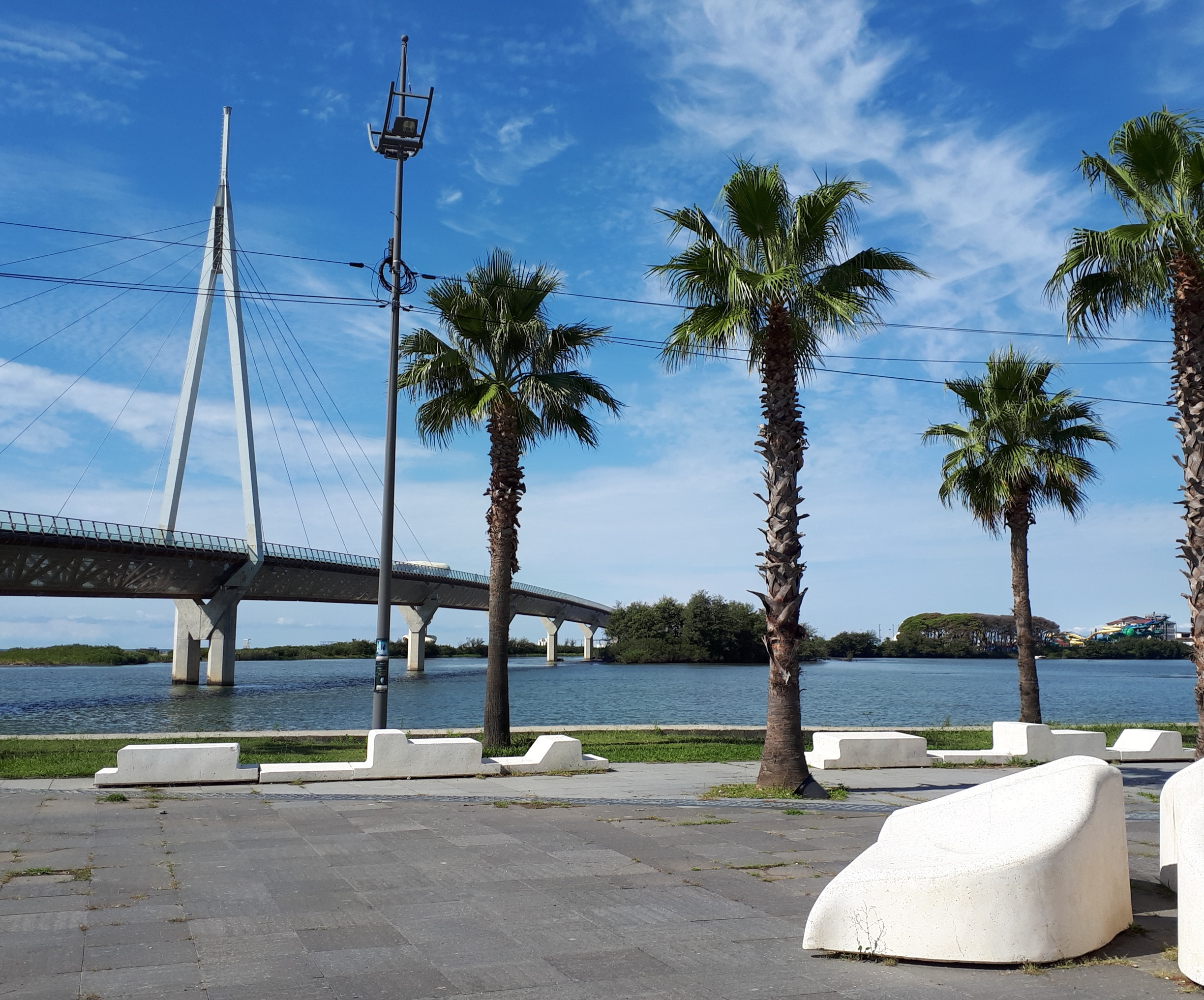
View of the Enguri River in Anaklia

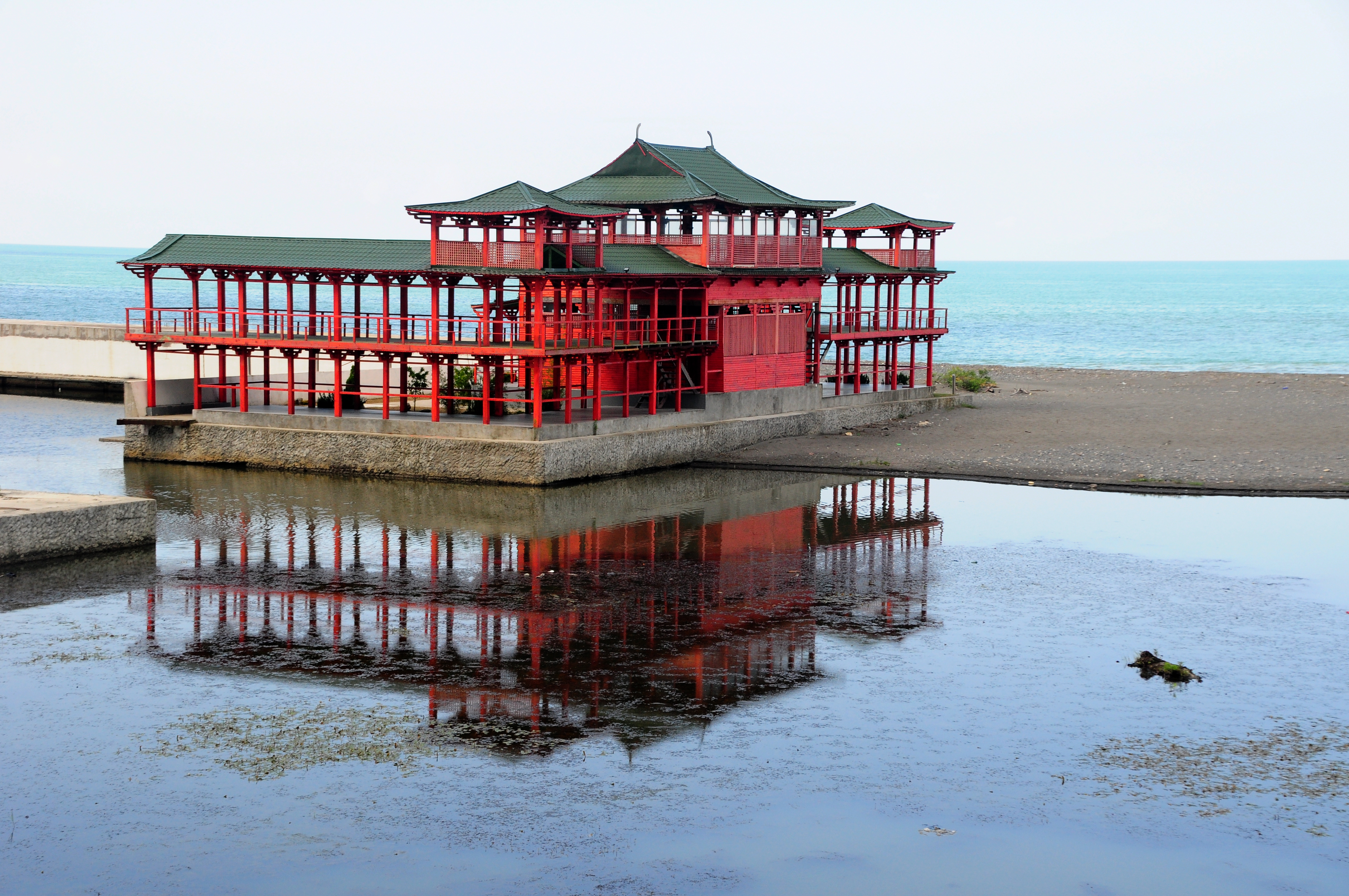
Restaurant in Ganmukhuri

Anaklia is a new resort, located on the southeastern coast of the Black Sea, on the left side of the Enguri River where it flows into the Black Sea, in the central part of the Colchis lowland. Coast of Anaklia is about 8 km in length, and in the distance of more than 1 km, there’s the resort promenade, and some comfortable hotels are placed along it. At the western end of the promenade begins the 540-meter pedestrian bridge that connects the resort to the village Ganmukhuri, located on the opposite side of the Enguri River. In the north the nearest neighbors of Anaklia are the towns of Gali, Ochamchire and Sokhumi, and in the south of it – Poti, Kobuleti and Batumi.

Anaklia is the part of Zugdidi district of Georgia, and its center, city of Zugdidi is 30 km away from Anaklia. In Zugdidi there is the palace of princes of Samegrelo – Dadiani, a beautiful park and a museum, which keeps one of the two existing death masks of Napoleon, which belonged to Marshal Murat, who once lived in this palace. Anaklia is located on flat terrain, bordered on the north western spurs of the Greater Caucasus Mountains Range, which can be perfectly viewed in clear weather, directly from the sea coast. The mountains are located at a distance of approximately 40 – 45 km. The area between the mountains and the sea is quite densely populated; there are many villages, whose inhabitants – Megrelians – engaged mainly in agriculture. There is a very fertile soil that, along with a mild climate, creates good conditions for the cultivation of many crops such as tea, citrus, feijoa, filbert, corn and soybeans.

== Anaklia Port Project ==
In 2016, Georgia decided to construct a new deepwater port at Anaklia, in the vicinity of the aborted project of the Lazika city. The new port project was developed by the Anaklia Development Consortium, a joint Georgian–United States venture. The construction began in December 2017. In July 2018, the Dutch marine contractor Van Oord was selected for the early dredging and reclamation works.

The Anaklia Port was to have become operational in December 2020, with a handling capacity of up to 10,000 TEU vessels. However, Georgia cancelled the project in 2019. The contract between the Georgian government and the investor Anaklia Development Consortium's (ADC) was cancelled in 2020, with the Georgian government citing missing deadlines and other issues. In May 2024, the Georgia's Ministry of Economy named the China Communications Construction Company as the government's private partner in the joint venture responsible for developing and managing the Anaklia port project. In July 2024, the ADC failed to win a case in the International Court of Arbitration to recoup investments in the project. In August, the Belgian company Jan De Nul has signed the agreement to build the marine infrastructure of the port.

== See also ==
- List of ports in Georgia (country)
