= Martvili Monastery =

Georgian Orthodox monastery in Martvili, Georgia

Martvili Monastery მარტვილის მონასტერი
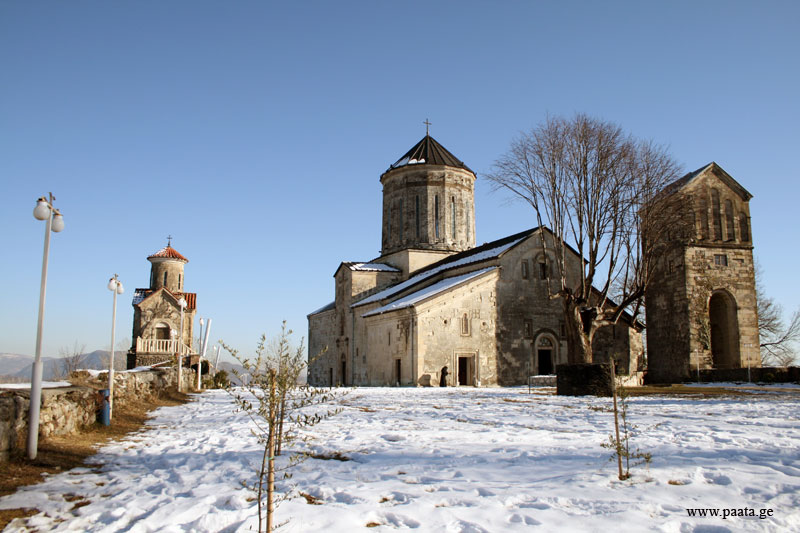
- The Martvili monastic complex.

- Location within Georgia

Religion
- Affiliation: Georgian Orthodox Church
- Region: Caucasus
- Status: Active

Location
- Location: Martvili, Martvili District, Samegrelo-Zemo Svaneti Province (Mkhare), Georgia
- Coordinates: 42.4053°N 42.3778°E

Architecture
- Type: Monastic complex
- Style: Georgian; Monastery
- Founder: Andrew
- Funded by: Rebuilt by King Giorgi II, 10th century
- Groundbreaking: 1st/7th century?
- Completed: Original construction of Martvili-Chkondidi Cathedral, late 7th century; rebuilt 10th century

Martvili Monastery (Georgian: მარტვილის მონასტერი) is a Georgian monastic complex located in the village of Martvili in the Martvili District of the Samegrelo-Zemo Svaneti Province (Mkhare) of Georgia. It sits upon the highest hill in the vicinity and was of strategic importance.

== History ==
The site upon the hill where the monastery stands today was used in ancient times as a pagan cultural center and was a sacred site. There once stood an ancient and enormous oak tree that was worshipped as an idol of fertility and prosperity. Infants were once sacrificed here as well. After the conversion of the native population to Christianity, the ancient tree was cut down so as not to worship it anymore. A church was originally constructed in the late 7th century upon the roots of the old oak tree and was named in honor of Saint Andrew who preached Christianity and converted the pagans across the Samegrelo region.

The main Martvili-Chkondidi Cathedral (Mingrelian: Chkoni translates to "oak") was reconstructed in the 10th century after invasions that destroyed the prior church. Preserved in the church are frescoes of the 14th to 17th centuries.

== Gallery ==
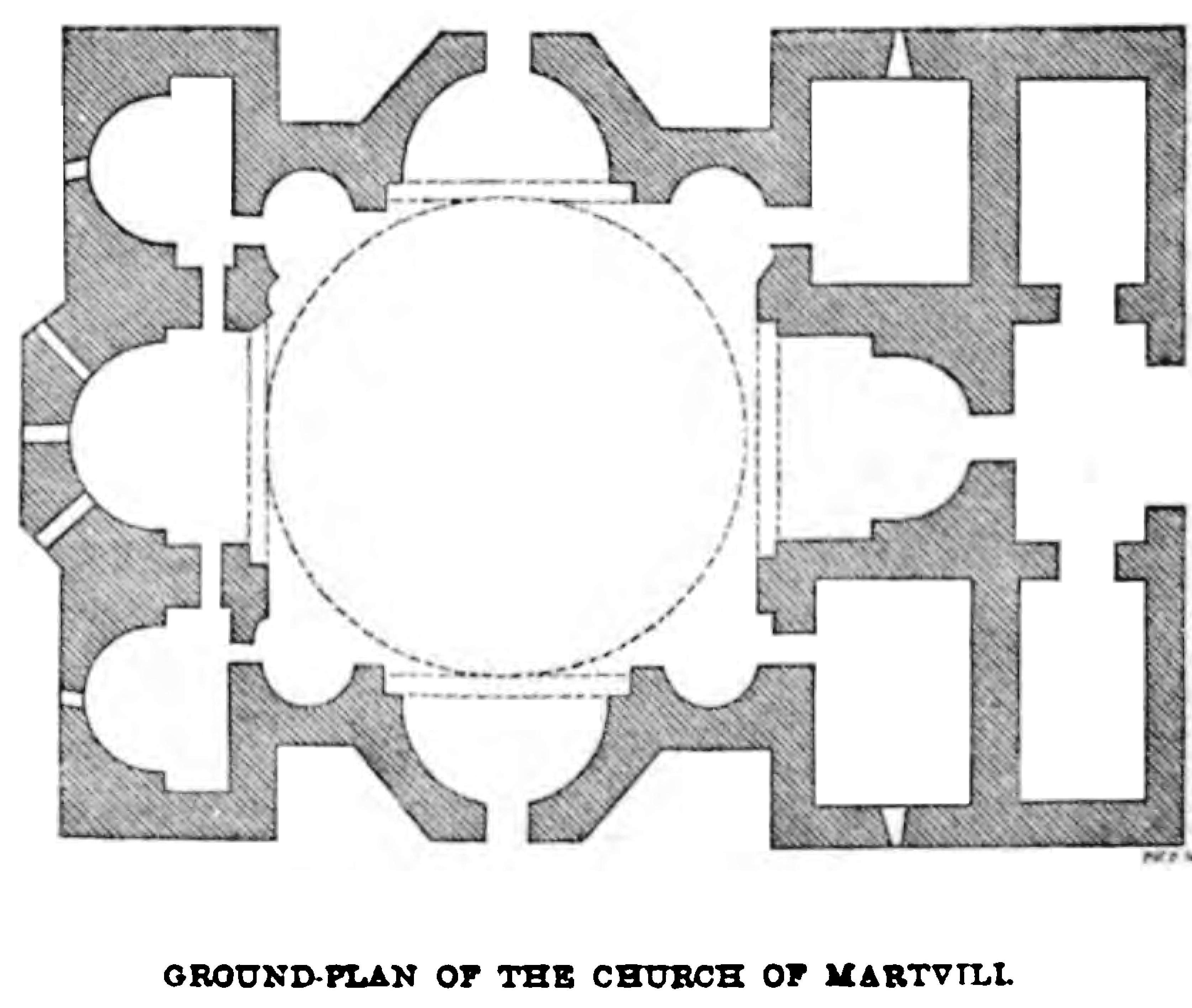
Martvili-Chkondidi Cathedral floorplan

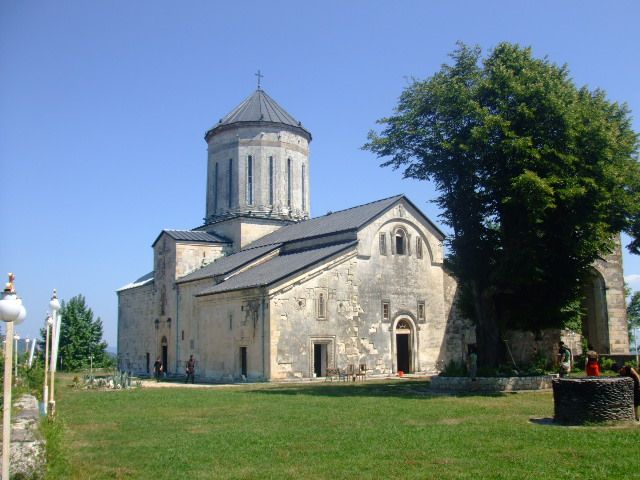
Martvili-Chkondidi Cathedral

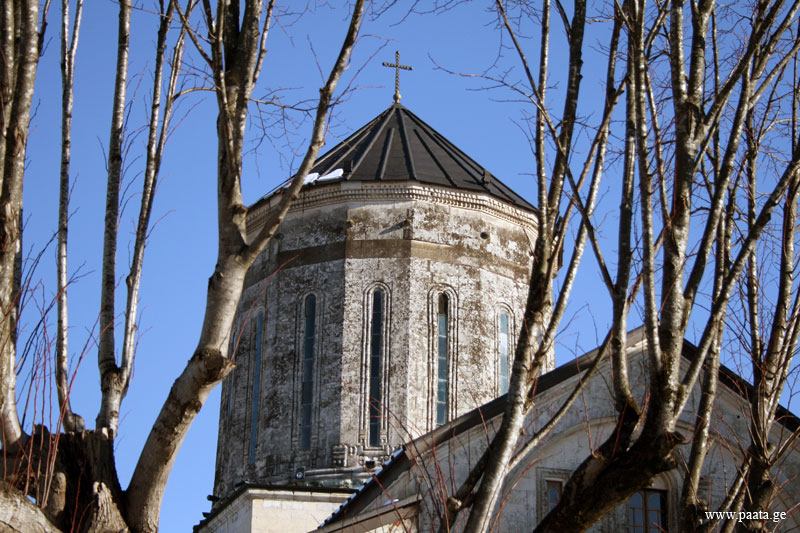
Cathedral drum and dome

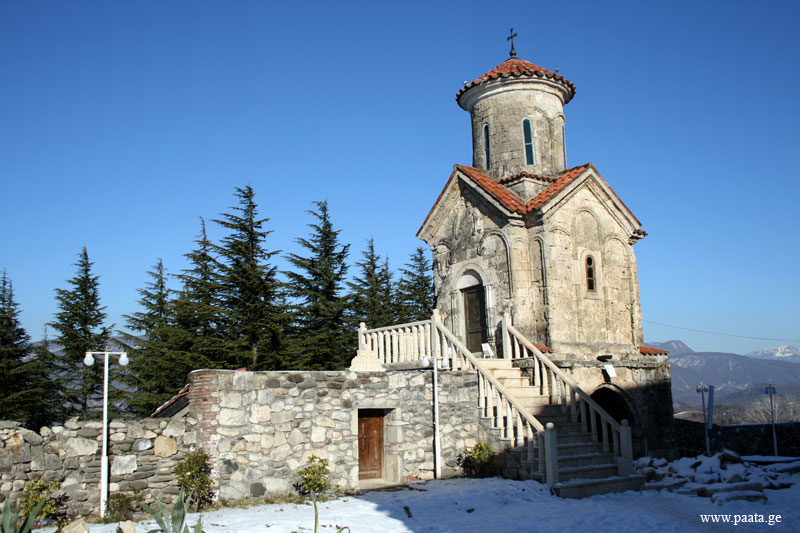

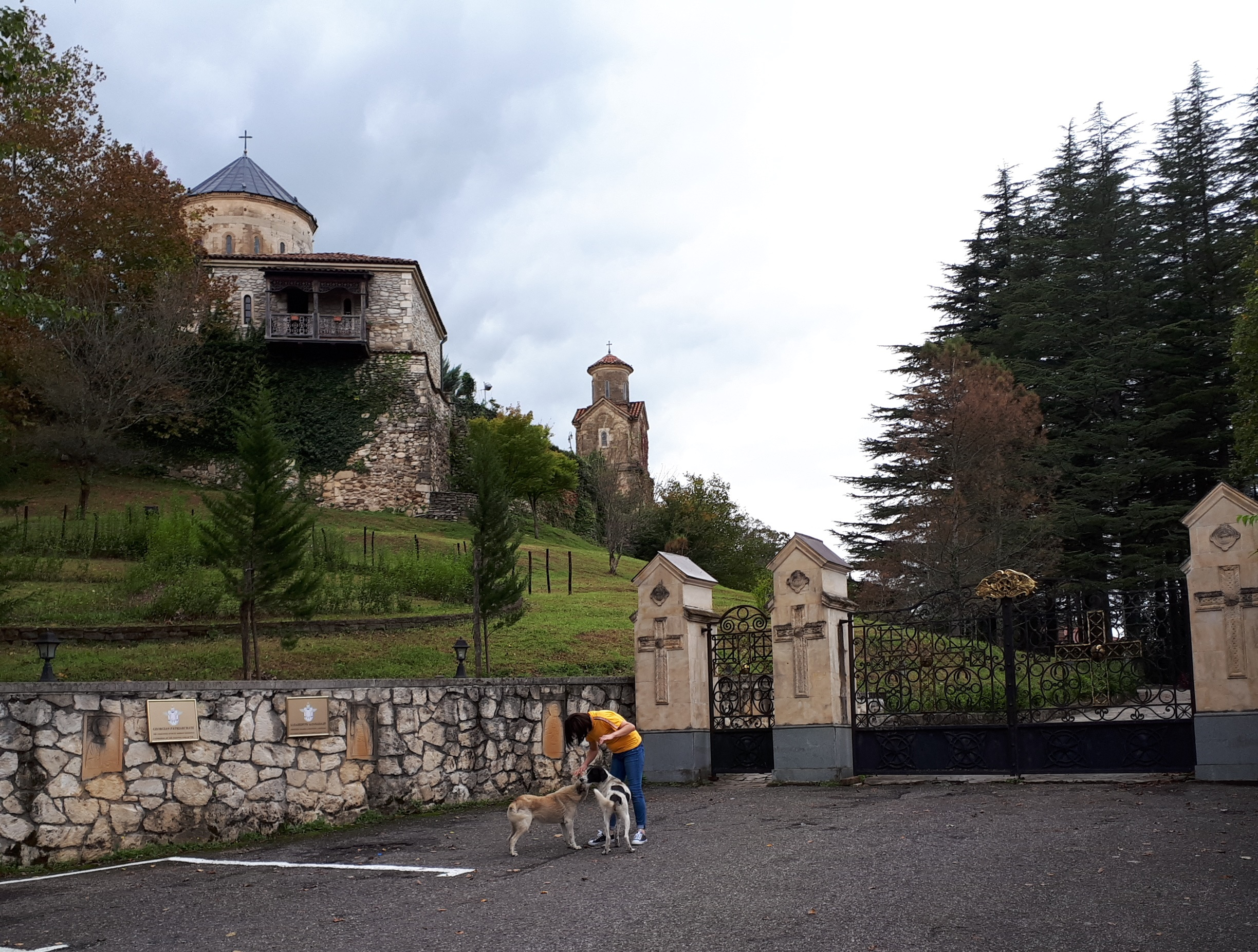
Martvili monastery, September 2018

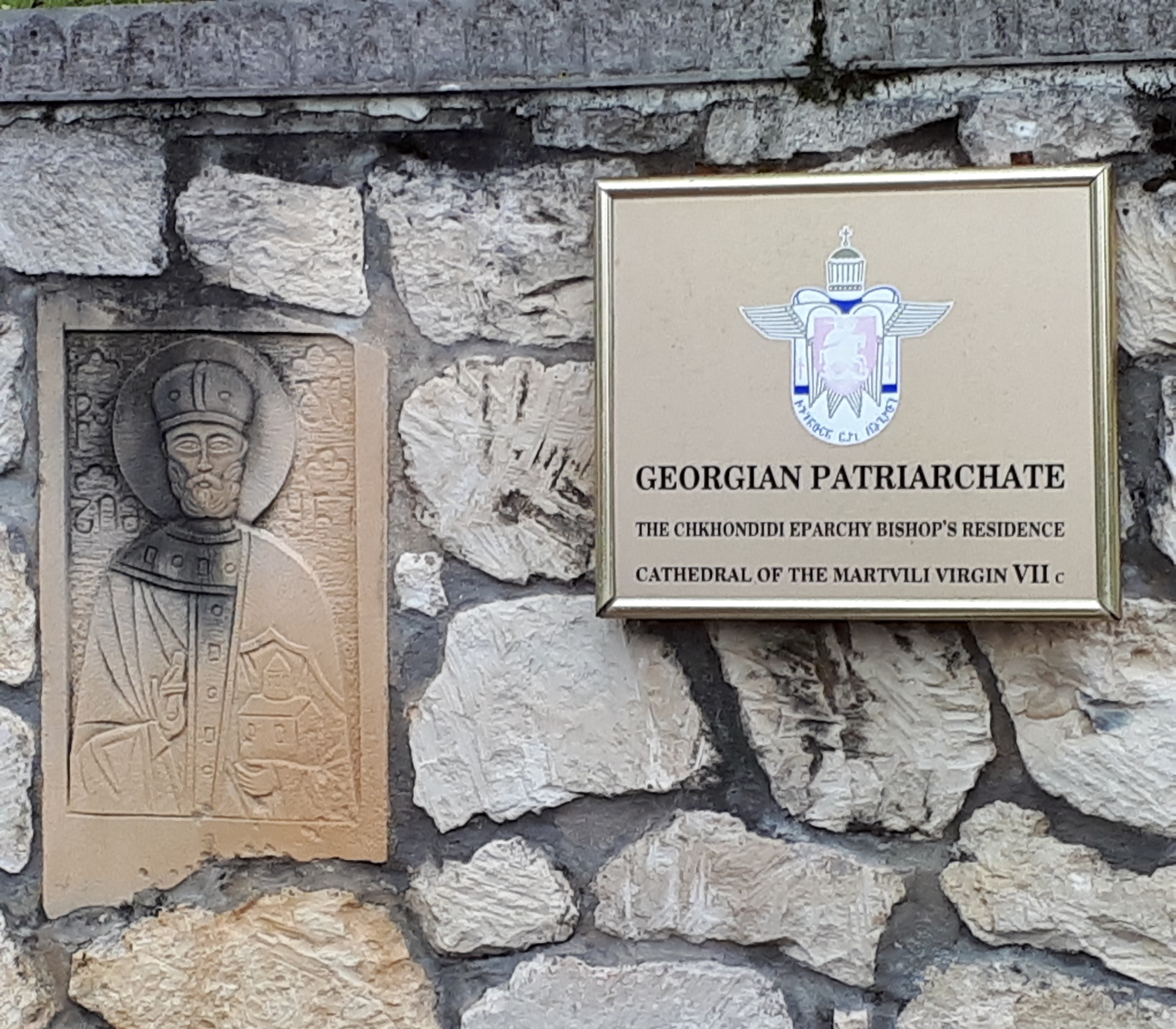
Martvili, seat of bishop, Chkhondidi eparchy at Martvili monastery

== See also ==
- Ioane Mesvete
