= Tsulukidze (family) =

Georgian noble family

Coat of arms of Princes Tsulukidze

The House of Tsulukidze (Georgian: წულუკიძე) is an old Georgian noble family, known in the western part of the country since 1451. According to a traditional account, they were elevated to a princely dignity (tavadi) by King George III of Imereti in 1605.

== History ==
Under the western Georgian Kings of Imereti, the Tsulukidze served as Constables of Lower Imereti and had a fiefdom in Racha, with a familial burial ground at the Nikortsminda Cathedral. The Tsulukidze were involved in a series of civil wars which plagued Imereti until the eventual annexation by the Russian Empire in 1810. The family was confirmed as princes (knyaz) of the Russian Empire in 1850.

The Tsulukidze family produced several notable political and military leaders from the 17th century into the 20th, including Sophia, Princess of Guria, General Varden Tsulukidze, and the Marxist revolutionary Alexander Tsulukidze.
