= Akaki (given name) =

- Gender: Male
- Language: Georgian

Origin
- Region of origin: Georgia

Akaki (Georgian: აკაკი) is a Georgian masculine given name. Notable people with the name include:

- Akaki Asatiani (born 1953), Georgian politician
- Akaki Bakradze (1928–1999), Georgian writer, literary critic, art historian, and public figure
- Akaki Beliashvili (1903/1904–1961), Georgian writer
- Akaki Chachua (born 1969), Georgian wrestler
- Akaki Chanturia (1881–1949), Georgian scientist, archeologist and ethnographer
- Akaki Chkhenkeli (1874–1959), Georgian Marxist politician
- Akaki Devadze (born 1971), Georgian footballer
- Akaki Eliava (1956–2000), Georgian military officer
- Akaki Gogia (born 1992), Georgian-born German footballer
- Akaki Kakauridze (1972–2001), Georgian-born Turkish boxer
- Akaki Khorava (1895–1972), Georgian actor, theater director, and pedagogue
- Akaki Khoshtaria (1873–1932), Georgian entrepreneur, socialite and philanthropist
- Akaki Khubutia (born 1986), Georgian footballer
- Akaki Meipariani (1918–1995), Georgian fencer
- Akaki Mgeladze (1910–1980), Georgian-Soviet politician was a Soviet politician
- Akaki Mikuchadze (born 1980), Georgian footballer
- Akaki Minashvili (born 1980), Georgian politician
- Akaki Shanidze (1887–1987), Georgian linguist, philologist and academician
- Akaki Surguladze (1913–1991), Georgian historian
- Aka Tabutsadze (born 1997), Georgian rugby union player
- Akaki Tsereteli (1840–1915), Georgian poet
- Akaki Tskarozia (born 1988), Georgian footballer
