= Akatov =

Akatov (Russian: Акатов; masculine) or Akatova (Акатова; feminine) is a Russian last name. A variant of this name is Akatyev/Akatyeva (Акатьев/Акатьева). It derives from the first name Akaky, which is of Greek origin and means placable, innocent.

People with the last name

- Vyacheslav Akatov, Russian reporter murdered in 2006

Toponyms

- Akatova, alternative name of Akatovo, a village in Ivanovskoye Rural Settlement of Ruzsky District in Moscow Oblast; 55°48′N 36°4′E
- Akatova, alternative name of Akatovo, a village under the administrative jurisdiction of the Town of Yegoryevsk in Yegoryevsky District of Moscow Oblast; 55°23′N 39°8′E

== See also ==
- Akatovo, several rural localities in Russia
