= Akatyev =

Akatyev (Russian: Акатьев; masculine) or Akatyeva (Акатьева; feminine) is a Russian last name, a variant of Akatov.

People with the last name

- Aleksey Akatyev (b. 1974), Russian Olympic freestyle swimmer
- Sofia Akatyeva (b. 2007), Russian figure skater

Toponyms

- Akatyeva, alternative name of Akatyevo, a village under the administrative jurisdiction of the Town of Klin in Klinsky District of Moscow Oblast; 56°18′N 36°50′E
- Akatyeva, alternative name of Akatyevo, a selo in Nizhneneninsky Selsoviet of Soltonsky District in Altai Krai; 52°46′N 86°28′E
- Akatyeva, alternative name of Akatyevo, a selo in Akatyevskoye Rural Settlement of Kolomensky District in Moscow Oblast; 54°59′N 38°45′E

== See also ==
- Akatyevo, several rural localities in Russia
