= Akaki =

Akaki can refer to:

- Akaki, Cyprus, village in Nicosia District, Cyprus
- Akaki (given name), Georgian masculine given name
- Akaki (woreda), woreda in Oromia Region, Ethiopia
- Akaki River, river in Addis Ababa, Ethiopia
- Nonoka Akaki (born 1990), Japanese newscaster
