= Russian–Georgian wars =

Russian–Georgian war may refer to:

- Red Army invasion of Georgia, 1921, also known as the Soviet—Georgian War
- 2008 South Ossetia War, also known as the Russo–Georgian War
