= Akhmeteli =

Akhmeteli may refer to:

== People ==
- Mikheil Akhmeteli (1895-1963), Georgian-German economist
- Sandro Akhmeteli (1886-1937), Georgian theater director
- Sofia Akhmeteli (born 1981), Georgian alpine skier
- Stepane Akhmeteli (1877-1922), Georgian general

== Places ==
- Akhmetelis Teatri (Tbilisi Metro), a metro station in Tbilisi, Georgia
