= Chichinadze =

Chichinadze may refer to:

- Dodo Chichinadze (1924–2009), Georgian actress
- Lela Chichinadze (born 1988), Georgian footballer
- Parmen Chichinadze (1881–1921), Georgian politician
- Zakaria Chichinadze (1854–1931), Georgian literary critic and bibliophile
