= Dadiani Palace =

- დადიანების სასახლე
- The palace of Princess Ekaterine, the main structure of the complex.

- Location within Samegrelo-Zemo Svaneti Location within Georgia
- Established: 1840
- Location: Palace of Princess Ekaterine Chavchavadze-Dadiani, 2, Zviad Gamsakhurdia str., Zugdidi, Georgia
- Coordinates: 42°30′44″N 41°52′27″E
- Type: Art museum, Design/Textile Museum, Historic site
- Collection size: 41,000
- Website: www.georgianmuseums.ge

Dadiani Palace (Georgian: დადიანების სასახლეთა ისტორიულ-არქიტექტურული მუზეუმი) is a complex of former princely residences in Georgia. Located in Zugdidi, Samegrelo-Zemo Svaneti region of western Georgia, it currently serves as a museum. Formerly a seat of the Georgian House of Dadiani, it is considered to be one of the most eminent princely residences in the Caucasus. Constructed in the 17th century and renovated in the 19th, the palace is a Neo Gothic building.

The main structure of the complex is known as the Queen's Palace, since it belonged to the Queen Regent of Mingrelia.

== History ==
The main structure of the Dadiani Palace in its present form is credited to the English architect Edwin Race (b. 1819), who was active in Georgia throughout the 19th century. The building is primarily in neo-Gothic style but also incorporates elements of Georgian, Russian, Islamic, and Tudor architecture.

The first exhibition at the palace displayed archaeological excavations of the ancient city of Nakalakevi, which was prepared by Megrelian prince David Dadiani, and took place in 1840. Three palaces form the modern museum complex, parts of which are also Blachernae Virgin Church and Zugdidi Botanical Garden. The Dadiani Palaces History and Architecture Museum houses some exhibits of natural cultural heritage of Georgia – Tagiloni treasure materials, Mother of God holy vesture, the icon of queen Bordokhan – mother of queen Tamar of Georgia, manuscripts from 13th – 14th centuries, miniatures, memorial relics of Dadiani dynasty, and objects connected to emperor of France Napoleon Bonaparte – brought to the palace by the husband of David Dadiani's daughter Salome Dadiani, prince Prince Charles Louise Napoléon Achille Murat (1847-1895), grandson of Napoleon's sister Caroline Bonaparte.

The palace was fully transformed into a museum on May 1, 1921, at the initiative of Georgian ethnographer and geologist Akaki Chanturia.

== Archaeological collection ==
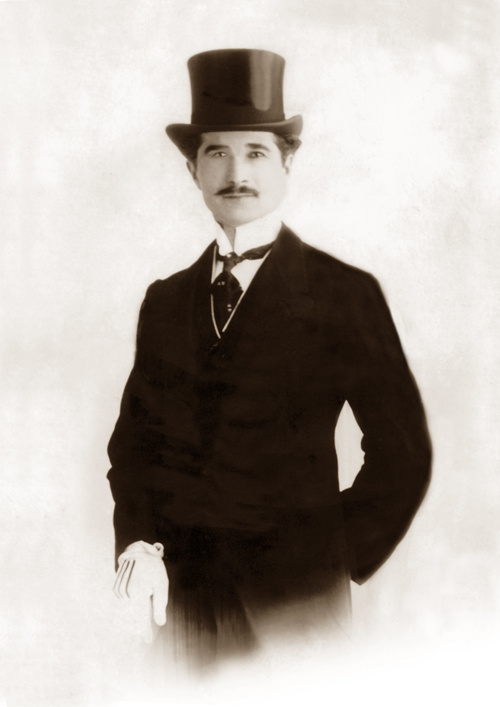
Akaki Chanturia, the founder of the Museum

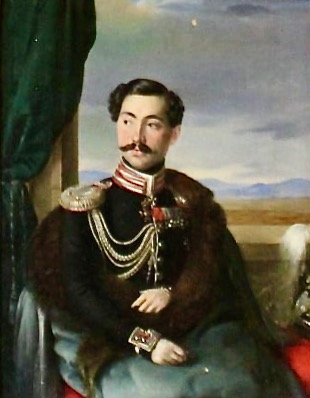
David Dadiani, Prince of Mingrelia

In early 1848, the prince of Samegrelo, David Dadiani, showed guests the archaeological and numismatic collection from Nokalakevi, an archaeological site in Samegrelo. Some of the exhibits were found by Dadiani himself, and some were purchased by him from settlers in his domain. The most important archaeological dig by David Dadiani was at Nokalakevi – known in antiquity as Archeopolis.
