= Grigol Lordkipanidze =

Georgian politician and author (1881-1937)

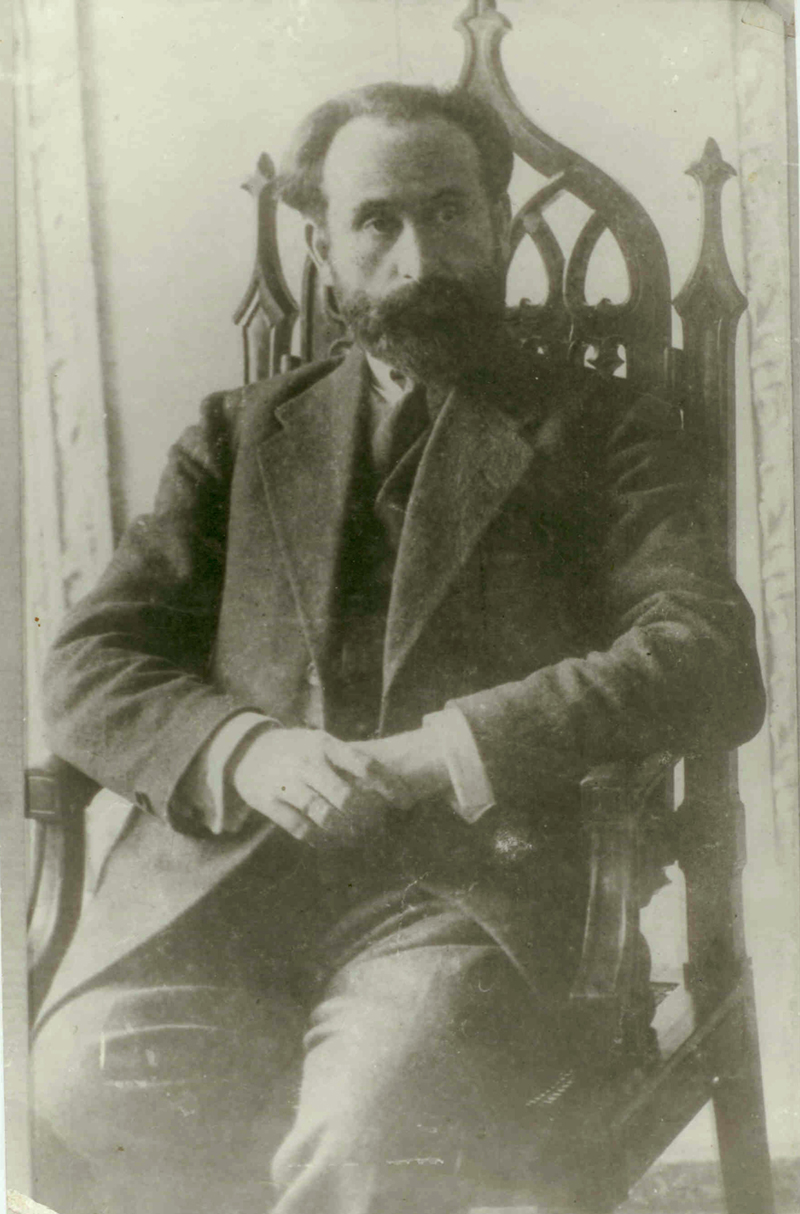
Grigol Lordkipanidze

Grigol Lordkipanidze (Georgian: გრიგოლ ლორთქიფანიძე; 2 September 1881 – 2 September 1937) was a Georgian politician and author.

During the Russian Revolution of 1917, he was involved in the Georgian independence movement. From 1919 to 1921, he served as a Minister of Education and then as a Defense Minister in the government of Noe Zhordania, a Menshevik leader of the Democratic Republic of Georgia. After the Soviet invasion of Georgia in 1921, he did not follow his fellow ministers into emigration and chose to stay in Georgia. Despite an amnesty granted by the newly established Bolshevik regime, he was arrested in May 1921, and deported to Suzdal where he composed his historical essay “Thoughts on Georgia” (“ფიქრები საქართველოზე”, 1922-1924). In 1925, he was moved to Kursk, where he was involved in educational activities and edited a local newspaper. In 1928, the Soviet authorities allowed him to return to Georgia and even consulted him on local affairs. Lordkipanidze, however, started to overtly criticize the forcible collectivization and the creation of the highly unpopular Transcaucasian SFSR in which the Georgian SSR was merged with Armenian SSR and Azerbaijan SSR. As a result, he was rearrested and redeported from Georgia. In 1929, he congratulated Joseph Stalin whose jubilee was pompously celebrated throughout the Soviet Union. The letter sent to the Soviet leader also contained harsh criticism of Stalin's policies, and hence he was rearrested and exiled to Siberia. During the 1937 Great Purges, he was summoned by Lavrenti Beria to Tbilisi to be interrogated as a "politically unreliable person". During the examination, he was subjected to extensive tortures and died on his 56th birthday on 2 September 1937. Lordkipanidze's family learned of his death only in the late 1950s, but the place of his burial remains unknown to this day.
