= Parmen Chichinadze =

Georgian politician

Parmen Chichinadze (Georgian: ; 13 November 1881 – 30 September 1921
- პარმენ ჭიჭინაძე
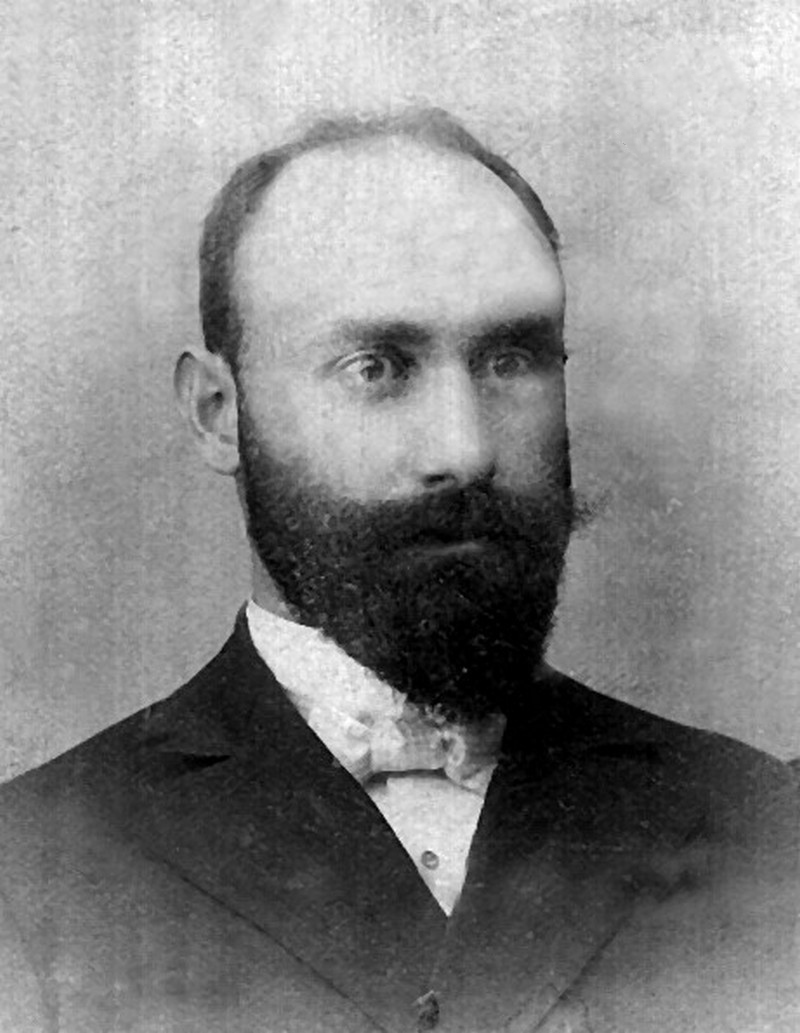
- Born: November 13, 1881 village of Godogani, Kutaisi Governorate, Russian Empire
- Died: September 30, 1921 (aged 39); Metekhi, Tiflis, Georgian SSR
- Occupation: Politician

Parmen Chichinadze (Georgian: პარმენ ჭიჭინაძე; 13 November 1881 – 30 September 1921) was a Georgian Social-Democratic politician and the Minister of War of the Democratic Republic of Georgia from November 1920 to February 1921.

Born in the Georgian village of Godogani in the Kutais Governorate of the Russian Empire, Chichinadze was trained as a physician. He became involved in Marxist revolutionary activities and, as a member of the Menshevik faction, took part in the Russian Revolution of 1905. Chichinadze was persecuted by the Imperial government and exiled from Georgia from 1911 to 1915. During the Russian Revolution of 1917, Chichinadze was active in Rostov-on-Don, which he left for Georgia after the Bolshevik coup in October 1917. He joined the Menshevik-dominated government of now-independent Georgia and was appointed the country's Minister of War in November 1920. He tenure was terminated by the Red Army invasion of Georgia, in February 1921, which brought Georgia's short-lived independence to an end. Unlike most of the Menshevik leaders, Chichinadze did not flee abroad and remained in the country, only to be arrested by the new Bolshevik regime and cast in the Metekhi prison in Tiflis. He became ill of meningitis and died at a hospital for his transfer from prison was delayed by the officials.
