= Akaki Tskarozia =

Georgian footballer

Personal information
- Full name: Akaki Tornikevich Tskarozia
- Date of birth: 2 August 1988 (age 38)
- Place of birth: Tbilisi, Georgian SSR, USSR
- Height: 1.84 m (6 ft 1/2 in)
- Position: Midfielder

Senior career*
Years	Team	Apps	(Gls)
2006	Znamya Truda	2	(0)
2007	Mashuk Pyatigosrsk	2	(0)
2007	Lokomotivi Tbilisi		
2007–2008	Sinđelić Beograd	17	(1)
2008–2009	Bežanija	13	(1)
2009	Samtredia		
2010	Prykarpattya Ivano-Frankivsk	24	(3)
2011–2013	Bodva Moldava nad Bodvou	9	(1)
2013–2014	WIT Georgia	27	(0)
2014–2015	Merani Martvili	22	(3)
2015	Zugdidi	12	(1)
2016	Merani Martvili	20	(0)
2017	Zugdidi	12	(0)
2018	Telavi	3	(0)
- * Club domestic league appearances and goals as of 2 May 2018

Akaki Tskarozia (Georgian: აკაკი წყაროზია, born 2 August 1988) is a Georgia football midfielder who last played for FC Telavi in the Erovnuli Liga 2.

== Club ==
He began his career with Russian clubs FC Znamya Truda Orekhovo-Zuyevo and FC Mashuk. After a spell back home with FC Lokomotivi Tbilisi in 2007, he moved again abroad, this time to Serbia to play first with lower league side FK Sinđelić Beograd and next with Serbian First League club FK Bežanija. In 2009, he returned to Georgia to play with FC Samtredia in the Georgian Top League. During the winter break of the 2009–10 season he moved to Prykarpattya Ivano-Frankivsk and played with them in the Ukrainian First League. In the following winter break he joined Slovak club FK Bodva Moldava nad Bodvou playing in the Slovak 2. liga. In summer 2013 he returned to Georgia and joined top flight side FC WIT Georgia.
