= Soviet invasion of Georgia =

1921 invasion of the Democratic Republic of Georgia

- Part of the Southern Front of the Russian Civil War, the Eastern Front of the Turkish War of Independence, and military occupations by the Soviet Union
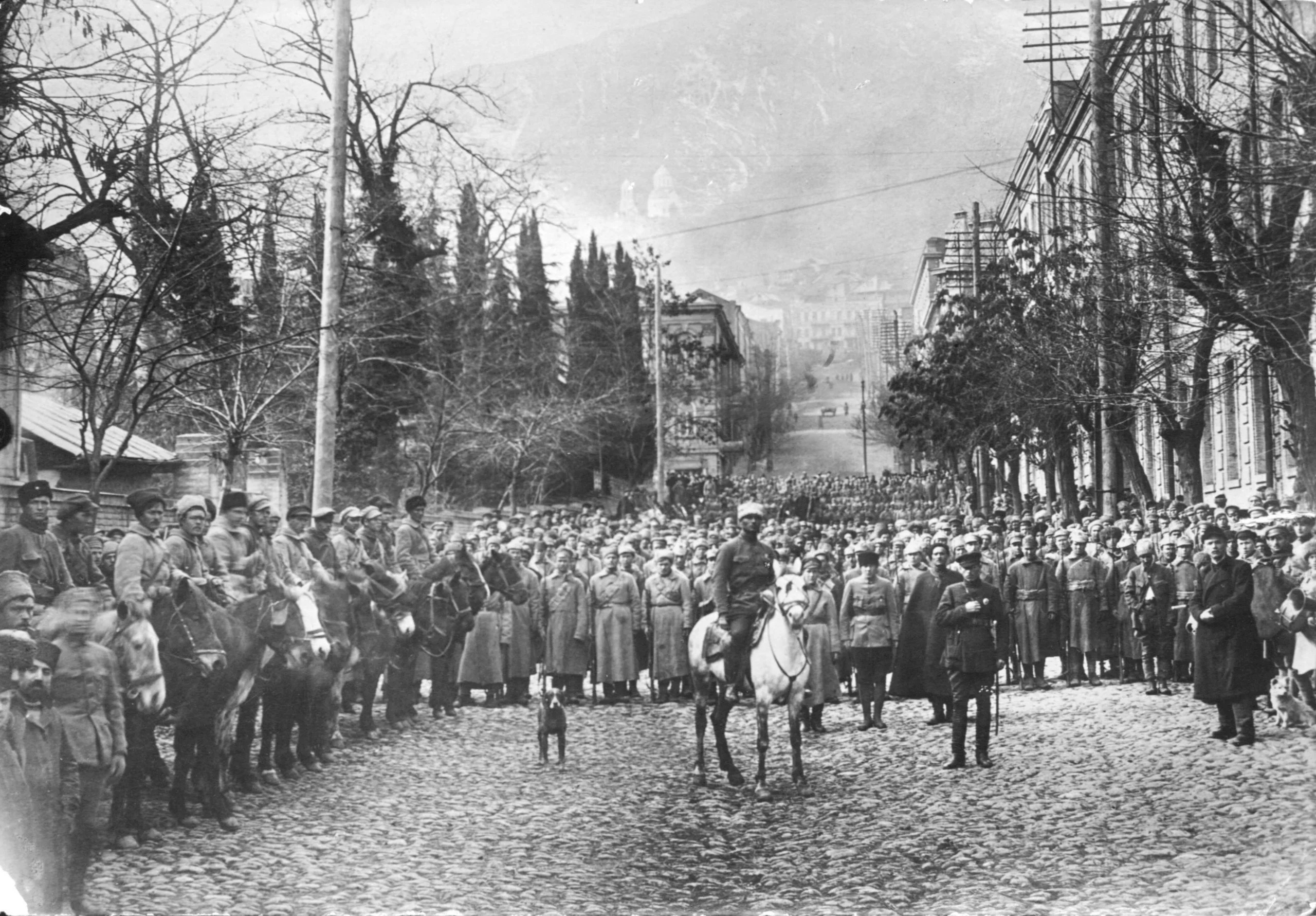
- The Red Army in Tbilisi, 25 February 1921
Date	12 February – 17 March 1921 (1 month and 6 days)
Location	Georgia
Result	Soviet victory
Territorial changes	Establishment of the Georgian Soviet Socialist Republic, Artvin and Ardahan ceded to Turkey, Lori ceded to the Armenian Soviet Socialist Republic

Belligerents
Soviet Russia; Soviet Armenia; Soviet Azerbaijan Co-belligerent: Ankara Government	(Democratic Republic of Georgia) Georgia

Commanders and leaders
(Russian Soviet Federative Socialist Republic) Joseph Stalin (Russian Soviet Federative Socialist Republic) Mikhail Velikanov (Russian Soviet Federative Socialist Republic) Anatoly Gekker (Russian Soviet Federative Socialist Republic) Sergo Ordzhonikidze (Russian Soviet Federative Socialist Republic) Filipp Makharadze Kâzım Karabekir	(Democratic Republic of Georgia) Parmen Chichinadze (Democratic Republic of Georgia) Giorgi Kvinitadze (Democratic Republic of Georgia) Giorgi Mazniashvili (Democratic Republic of Georgia) Valiko Jugheli (WIA)

Units involved
Red Army: 11th Army; 9th Army; 98th Independent Rifle Brigade; Soviet Armenian Mounted Brigade; Red Baku Brigade; Army of the Grand National Assembly: XV. Corps	Regular Army: 1st Rifle Division; 2nd Rifle Division; Independent Mountain Artillery Division; 1st Sukhumi Border Regiment; 2nd Border Regiment; People's Guard of Georgia

Strength
40,000 infantry 4,300 cavalry 196 artillery pieces 1,065 machine guns 50 fighter aircraft 7 armoured trains 4 tanks 24+ armoured cars 20,000	11,000 infantry 400 mounted infantry hundreds from the People's Guard of Georgia; 46 artillery pieces several hundred machine guns 56 fighter aircraft (including 25 Ansaldo SVA-10s and one Sopwith Camel.); 4 armoured trains several armoured cars

Casualties and losses
Soviet: 5,500 killed 2,500 captured Unknown number wounded Turkish: 30 killed 26 wounded 46 missing	3,200 killed or captured Unknown number wounded 3,800–5,000 civilians killed

The Soviet invasion of Georgia (12 February – 17 March 1921), also known as the Georgian–Soviet War or the Red Army invasion of Georgia, was a military campaign by the Russian Soviet Red Army aimed at overthrowing the Social Democratic (Menshevik) government of the Democratic Republic of Georgia (DRG) and installing a Bolshevik regime (Communist Party of Georgia) in the country. The conflict was a result of expansionist policy by the Bolsheviks, who aimed to control as much as possible of the lands which had been part of the former Russian Empire until the turbulent events of the First World War, as well as the revolutionary efforts of mostly Georgian Bolsheviks located in Russia, who did not have sufficient support in their native country to seize power without external intervention.

Soviet Russia recognised Georgia's independence in the Treaty of Moscow, signed on 7 May 1920, and the subsequent invasion of the country was not universally agreed upon in Moscow. It was largely engineered by two influential Georgian-born Soviet officials, Joseph Stalin and Sergo Ordzhonikidze, who on 14 February 1921 received the consent of Russian leader Vladimir Lenin to advance into Georgia, on the pretext of supporting the alleged "peasants' and workers' rebellion" in the country. Russian forces took the Georgian capital Tbilisi (then known as Tiflis to most non-Georgian speakers) after heavy fighting and declared the Georgian Soviet Socialist Republic on 25 February 1921. The rest of the country was overrun within three weeks, but Soviet rule was not firmly established until September 1924, when it crushed the August Uprising. The almost simultaneous invasion and occupation of a large portion of southwest Georgia by Turkey (February–March 1921) threatened to develop into a crisis between Moscow and Ankara, and led to significant territorial concessions by the Soviets to the Turkish National Government in the Treaty of Kars.

== Background ==
After the February Revolution that began in Russia in 1917, Georgia effectively became independent. In April 1918 it joined with Armenia and Azerbaijan to form the Transcaucasian Democratic Federative Republic, but left after one month and declared independence as the Democratic Republic of Georgia on 26 May, followed the next day by both Armenia and Azerbaijan. Georgia engaged in small conflicts with its neighbouring states as it attempted to establish its borders, though it was able to maintain independence and de facto international recognition throughout the Russian Civil War, including being recognized by Soviet Russia in the Treaty of Moscow.

Despite relatively broad public support and some successful reforms, Georgia's Social Democratic leadership failed to build a stable economy or a strong, disciplined army capable of resisting an invasion. Although there were a significant number of highly qualified officers who had served in the Imperial Russian Army, the DRG's Regular Army as a whole was underfed and poorly equipped. A parallel military structure recruited from members of the Menshevik Party, the People's Guard of Georgia, was better motivated and disciplined, but being a lightly armed, highly politicised organisation dominated by party functionaries, it had little usefulness as a combat force.

== Prelude to the war ==
Red Army Caucasus Front Headquarters, c. 1921. From left to right: Sergei Ivanovich Gusev, Sergo Ordzhonikidze, Mikhail Tukhachevsky, Valentin Trifonov, uncertain. Two of the four named officers would be killed during Stalin's Great Purge.

Since the beginning of 1920, local Georgian Bolsheviks actively fomented political unrest in Georgia, leveraging agrarian disturbances in rural areas and inter-ethnic tensions within the country. The operational centre of the Soviet military-political forces in the Caucasus was the Kavbiuro (or Caucasian Office) attached to the Central Committee of the Russian Communist Party. Established in February 1920, this body was chaired by the Georgian Bolshevik Sergo Ordzhonikidze, with Sergey Kirov as vice-chairman. The Sovietization of the Caucasus appeared to Bolshevik leaders to be a task which would be easier to achieve while the Allied powers were preoccupied with the Turkish War of Independence; furthermore, the Ankara-based Turkish national government of Mustafa Kemal Atatürk had expressed its full commitment to close co-operation with Moscow, promising to compel "Georgia ... and Azerbaijan ... to enter into union with Soviet Russia ... and ... to undertake military operations against the expansionist Armenia." The Soviet leadership successfully exploited this situation and sent in its army to occupy Baku, the capital of the Azerbaijan Democratic Republic.

The Sovietization of Georgia in 1921 created major disagreements among Bolshevik leaders over how to bring the country under Soviet control. Stalin and Orjonikidze supported an immediate military invasion and stronger centralized control from Moscow, while Trotsky preferred allowing a local uprising to develop before intervening. Lenin was initially hesitant to approve the invasion because he feared international consequences, particularly tensions with Turkey, and resistance from the Georgian population. However, he eventually authorised the Red Army to support the uprising, partly because Bolshevik leaders operating from Baku had already taken steps toward invading Georgia. Even after approving the invasion, Lenin emphasised the importance of treating the Georgian population with caution and moderation, opposing the harsher policies favoured by Stalin and Orjonikidze. When Lenin became seriously ill, his influence weakened, allowing Stalin and his supporters to gain the upper hand and impose a more centralised and authoritarian Soviet system in Georgia.

After Soviet rule was established in Baku in April 1920, Ordzhonikidze, likely acting on his own initiative, advanced into Georgia to support a planned Bolshevik coup in Tbilisi. When the coup failed, the Georgian government concentrated all its forces on blocking the Soviet advance across the Georgian-Azerbaijani border. Facing a difficult war with Poland, Soviet leader Vladimir Lenin ordered negotiations with Georgia to begin. In the Treaty of Moscow signed on 7 May 1920, Soviet Russia recognised Georgia's independence and concluded a non-aggression pact. The treaty established the existing borders between the two nations de jure and also obliged Georgia to surrender all third-party elements considered hostile by Moscow. In a secret supplement, Georgia promised to legalise the local Bolshevik party.

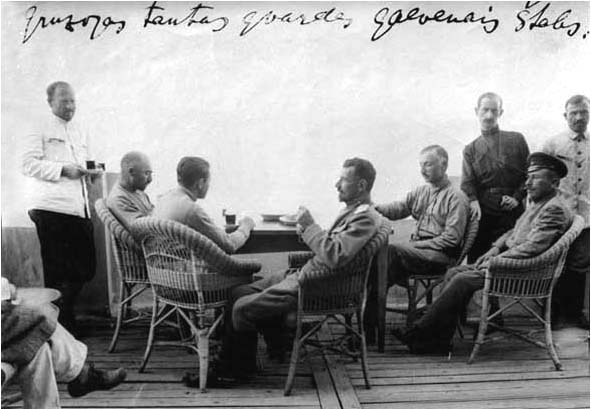
Georgian officers at the headquarters of the People's Guard in Tbilisi

Despite the peace treaty, the Menshevik-dominated government of Georgia was ultimately overthrown as intended and planned. With its well-established diplomatic ties to several European nations, and its control of strategic transit routes from the Black Sea to the Caspian, Georgia was viewed by the Soviet leadership as "an advance post of the Entente". Stalin called his homeland "the kept woman of the Western Powers". Georgian independence was seen as a propaganda victory for exiled Russian Mensheviks in Europe; the Bolsheviks couldn't long tolerate a viable Menshevik state on their own doorstep.

The cessation of Red Army operations against Poland, the defeat of the White Russian leader Wrangel, and the fall of the First Republic of Armenia provided a favourable situation to suppress the last independent nation in the Caucasus to resist Soviet control. By then, the British expeditionary corps had evacuated the Caucasus, and the West was reluctant to intervene in support of Georgia.

Map of the borders of the territory, which was proposed by the Georgian delegation at the Paris Peace Conference of 1919 for inclusion in the Democratic Republic of Georgia, as well as the territories that after 1921 are part of neighbouring states.

Moscow did not universally agree on Soviet military intervention, and Bolshevik leaders disagreed over how to deal with their southern neighbour. The People's Commissar of Nationalities Affairs, Joseph Stalin, who by the end of the Civil War had gained a remarkable amount of bureaucratic power, took a particularly hard line with his native Georgia. He strongly supported a military overthrow of the Georgian government and continuously urged Lenin to give his consent for an advance into Georgia. Soviet leadership had established a right to succession, but the precedence of the cause of socialism over national self-determination made it a flexible policy, subject to debate. The People's Commissar of War, Leon Trotsky, strongly disagreed with what he described as a "premature intervention", explaining that the population should be able to carry out the revolution. Pursuant to his national policy on the right of nations to self-determination, Lenin had initially rejected use of force, calling for extreme caution in order to ensure that Russian support would help but not dominate the Georgian revolution; however, as victory in the Civil War drew ever closer, Moscow's actions became less restrained. For many Bolsheviks, self-determination was increasingly seen as "a diplomatic game which has to be played in certain cases".

According to Moscow, relations with Georgia deteriorated over alleged violations of the peace treaty, the re-arrest by Georgia of Georgian Bolsheviks, obstruction of the passage of convoys to Armenia, and a suspicion that Georgia was aiding armed rebels in the North Caucasus.

== Red Army invasion ==
The tactics used by the Soviets to gain control of Georgia were similar to those applied in Azerbaijan and Armenia in 1920, i.e., to send in the Red Army while encouraging local Bolsheviks to stage unrest; however, this policy was difficult to implement in Georgia, where the Bolsheviks did not enjoy popular support and remained an isolated political force.

On the night of 11–12 February 1921, at Ordzhonikidze's instigation, Bolsheviks attacked local Georgian military posts in the predominantly ethnic Armenian district of Lori and the nearby village of Shulaveri, near the Armenian and Azerbaijani borders. Georgia had taken over the Lori "neutral zone" in a disputed Armeno–Georgian borderland on the pretext of defending the district and approaches to Tiflis in October 1920, in the course of the Armenian genocide, which was perpetrated by Turkey. The Armenian government protested but could not resist.

Shortly after the Bolshevik revolt, Armenian-based Red Army units quickly came to the insurrection's aid, though without Moscow's formal approval. When the Georgian government protested to the Soviet envoy in Tbilisi, Aron Sheinman, over the incidents, he denied any involvement and declared that the disturbances must be a spontaneous revolt by the Armenian communists. Meanwhile, the Bolsheviks had already set up a Georgian Revolutionary Committee (Georgian Revkom) in Shulaveri, a body that would soon acquire the functions of a rival government. Chaired by the Georgian Bolshevik Filipp Makharadze, the Revkom formally applied to Moscow for help.

Disturbances also erupted in the town of Dusheti and among Ossetians in northeast Georgia who resented the Georgian government's refusal to grant them autonomy. Georgian forces contained the disorder in some areas, but preparations for a Soviet intervention were already underway. When the Georgian army moved to Lori to crush the revolt, Lenin finally gave in to Stalin and Ordzhonikidze's repeated requests to allow the Red Army to invade Georgia, on the pretext of aiding an uprising. The ultimate decision was made at the 14 February meeting of the Central Committee of the Communist Party:

The Central Committee is inclined to allow the 11th Army to give active support to the uprising in Georgia and to occupy Tiflis provided that international norms are observed, and on condition that all members of the Military Revolutionary Council of the Eleventh Army, after a thorough review of all information, guarantee success. We give warning that we are having to go without bread for want of transport and that we shall therefore not let you have a single locomotive or railway track. We are compelled to transport nothing from the Caucasus but grain and oil. We require an immediate answer by direct line signed by all members of the Military Revolutionary Council of the Eleventh Army.

The decision to support the invasion was not unanimous. Karl Radek opposed it, and the decision was kept secret from Trotsky, who was in the Ural area at the time. The latter was so upset by the news of the Central Committee decision and Ordzhonikidze's role in engineering it that on his return to Moscow he demanded, though fruitlessly, that a special party commission be set up to investigate the affair. Later Trotsky would reconcile himself to the accomplished fact and even defend the invasion in a special pamphlet. This pamphlet by Trotsky is perhaps the best-known book justifying the invasion. It rebutted Karl Kautsky's work, which declared Georgia a democratic socialist workers' and peasants' republic.

=== Battle for Tbilisi ===
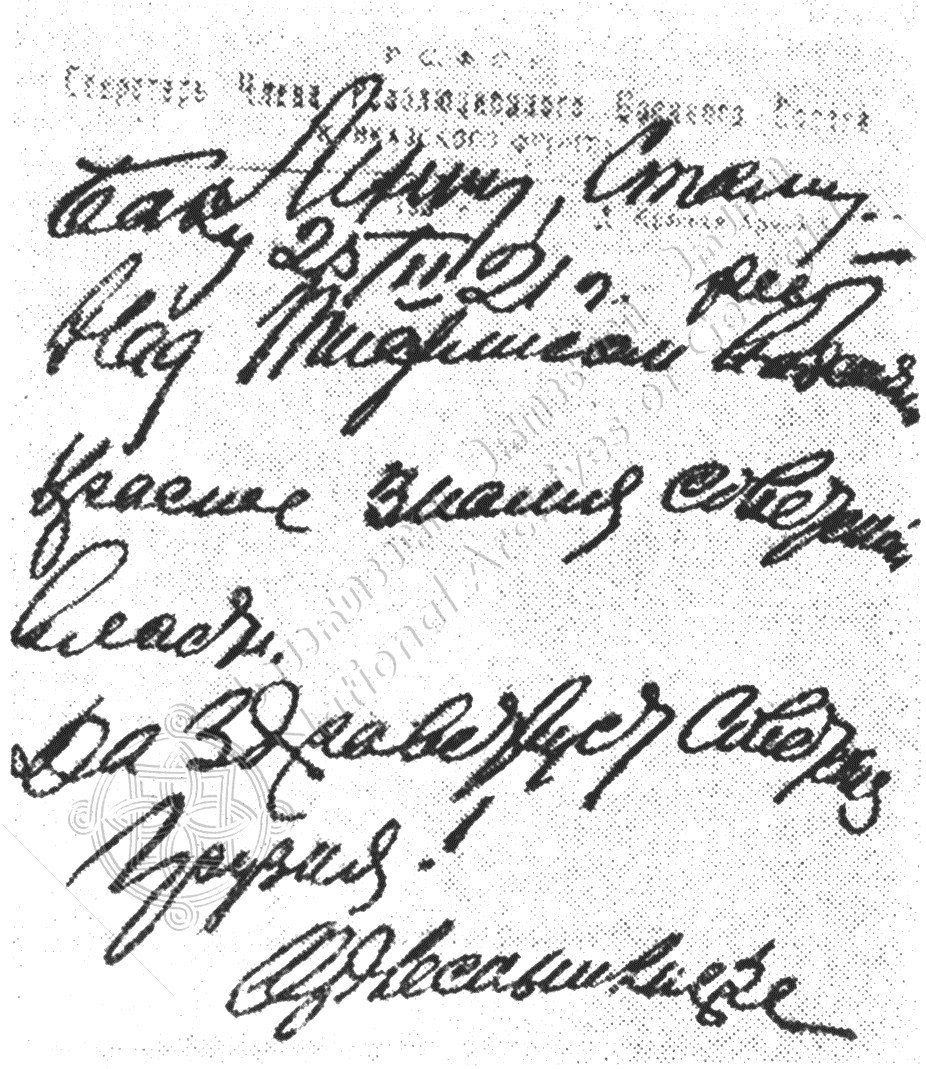
Orjonikidze's telegram to Lenin and Stalin: "The Red Flag of Soviet power flies over Tiflis..." (National Archives of Georgia)

At dawn on 16 February the main body of 11th Red Army troops under Anatoliy Gekker crossed into Georgia and started the Tiflis Operation aimed at capturing the capital. Georgian border forces under General Stephen Akhmeteli were overwhelmed on the Khrami River. Retreating westward, Georgian commander General Tsulukidze blew up railway bridges and demolished roads to delay the enemy's advance. Simultaneously, Red Army units marched into Georgia from the north through the Daryal and Mamisoni passes, and along the Black Sea coast towards Sukhumi. While these events were proceeding, the Soviet Commissar for Foreign Affairs issued a series of statements disclaiming involvement by the Red Army and professing willingness to mediate any disputes which had arisen within Georgia.

By 17 February, Soviet infantry and cavalry divisions supported by aircraft were less than 15 kilometres northeast of Tbilisi. The Georgian army put up a stubborn fight defending the approaches to the capital, which they held for a week despite overwhelming Red Army superiority. From 18 to 20 February, the strategic heights of Kojori and Tabakhmela changed hands in heavy fighting. Georgian forces under General Giorgi Mazniashvili pushed the Soviets back, inflicting heavy losses; they quickly regrouped and tightened the circle around Tbilisi. By 23 February, the railway bridges had been restored, and Soviet tanks and armoured trains joined in a renewed assault on the capital. While the armoured trains laid down suppressing fire, tanks and infantry penetrated the Georgian positions on the Kojori heights. On 24 February, the Georgian commander-in-chief, Giorgi Kvinitadze, bowed to the inevitable and ordered a withdrawal to save his army from complete encirclement and the city from destruction. The Georgian government and the Constituent Assembly evacuated to Kutaisi in western Georgia, which dealt the Georgian army a significant morale blow.

On 25 February, the triumphant Red Army entered Tbilisi. Bolshevik soldiers engaged in widespread looting. The Revkom headed by Mamia Orakhelashvili and Shalva Eliava ventured into the capital and proclaimed the overthrow of the Menshevik government, the dissolution of the Georgian National Army and People's Guard, and the formation of a Georgian Soviet Socialist Republic. On the same day, in Moscow, Lenin received the congratulations of his commissars – "The Soviet red flag is flying over Tbilisi. Long live Soviet Georgia!"

=== Kutaisi Operation ===
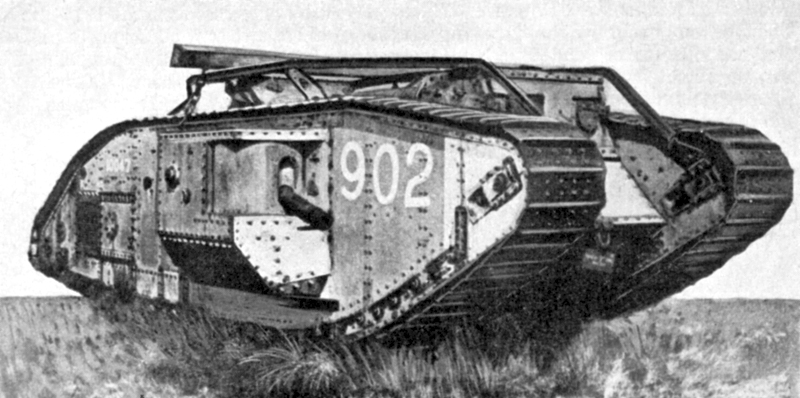
The British Mark V tanks seized by the Red Army in the course of the Civil War and Foreign Intervention contributed to the Soviet victory in the battle for Tbilisi.

Georgian commanders planned to concentrate their forces at the town of Mtskheta, northwest of Tbilisi, and continue fighting on new lines of defence; however, the fall of the capital had heavily demoralised the Georgian troops, and Mtskheta was abandoned. The army gradually disintegrated as it retreated westward, offering sometimes fierce but largely unorganised resistance to the advancing Red Army. Sporadic fighting continued for several months as the Soviets secured the major cities and towns of eastern Georgia.

The Mensheviks hoped for aid from a French naval squadron cruising in the Black Sea off the Georgian coast. On 28 February, the French opened fire on the 31st Rifle Division of the 9th Red Army under V. Chernishev, but did not land troops. The Georgians regained control of the coastal town of Gagra, but their success was temporary. Soviet forces joined by Abkhaz peasant militias, the Kyaraz, succeeded in taking Gagra on 1 March, New Athos on 3 March, and Sukhumi on 4 March; they then advanced eastward to occupy Zugdidi on 9 March and Poti on 14 March.

The Georgians’ attempt to hold out near Kutaisi was spoiled by the surprise advance of a Red Army detachment from the North Caucasus, which traversed the virtually impenetrable Mamisoni Pass through deep snow drifts, and advanced down the Rioni Valley. After a bloody clash at Surami on 5 March 1921, the 11th Red Army also crossed the Likhi Range into western Georgia. On 10 March, Soviet forces entered Kutaisi, which had been abandoned, the Georgian leadership, army and People's Guard having evacuated to the key Black Sea port city of Batumi in southwest Georgia. Some Georgian forces withdrew into the mountains and continued to fight.

=== Crisis with Turkey ===
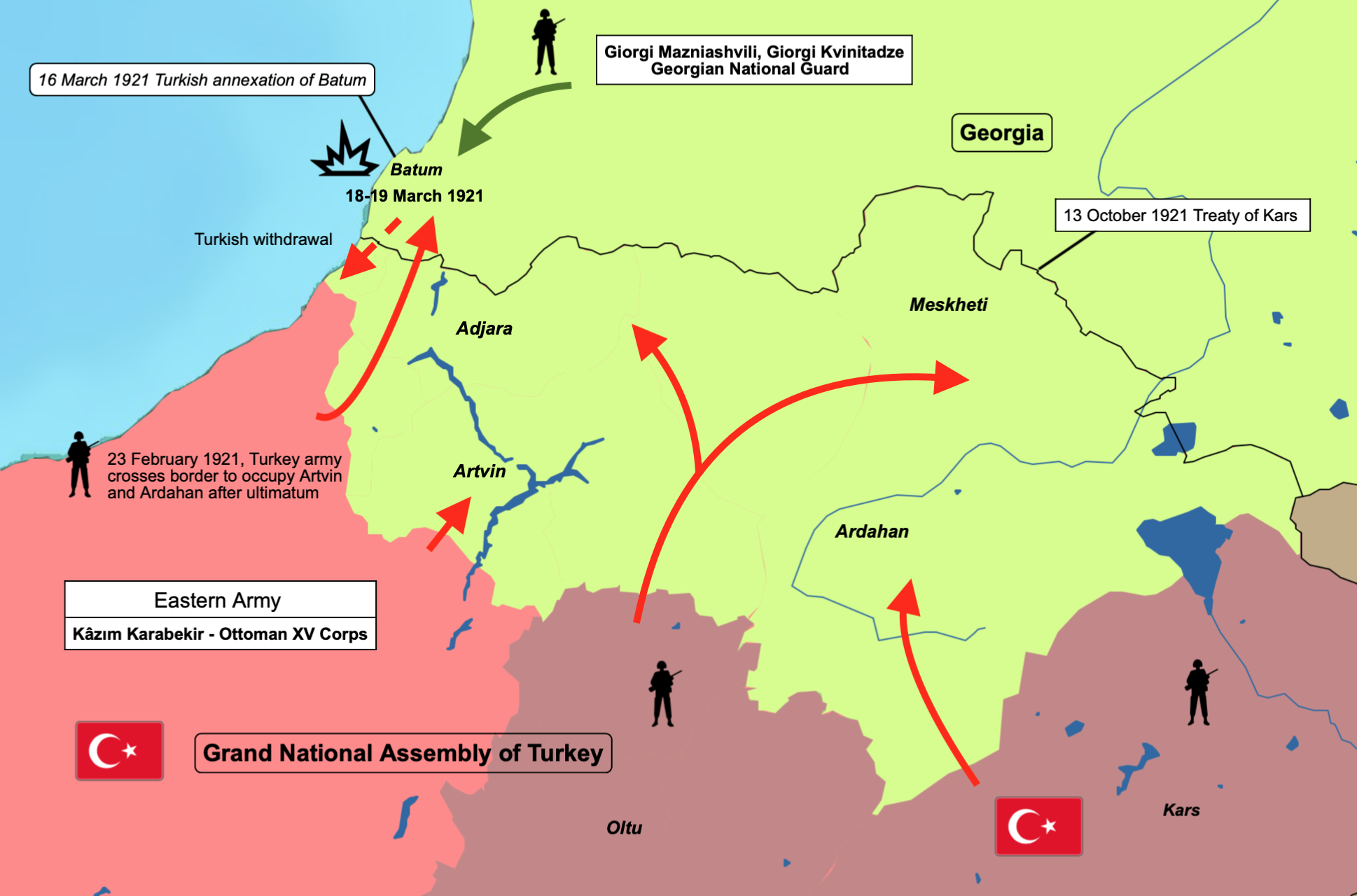
Map of Turkish invasion of Georgian-held territories February–March 1921

On 23 February, ten days after the Red Army began its march on Tbilisi, Kâzım Karabekir, the commander of the Eastern Front of the Turkish Army of the Grand National Assembly, issued an ultimatum demanding the evacuation of Ardahan and Artvin by Georgia. The Mensheviks, under fire from both sides, had to accede, and the Turkish force advanced into Georgia, occupying the frontier areas. No armed engagements took place between the Turkish and Georgian forces. This brought the Turkish army within close range of still Georgian-held Batumi, creating the conditions for a possible armed clash as the Red Army's 18th Cavalry Division under Dmitry Zhloba approached the city. Hoping to use these circumstances to their advantage, the Mensheviks reached a verbal agreement with Karabekir on 7 March, permitting the Turkish army to enter the city while leaving the government of Georgia in control of its civil administration. On 8 March, Turkish troops under Colonel Kizim-Bey took up defensive positions surrounding the city, leading to a crisis with Soviet Russia. Georgy Chicherin, Soviet People's Commissar for Foreign Affairs, submitted a protest note to Ali Fuat Cebesoy, the Turkish representative in Moscow. In response, Ali Fuat handed the Soviet government two notes. The Turkish notes claimed that the Turkish armies were only providing security to local Muslim elements put under threat by Soviet military operations in the region.

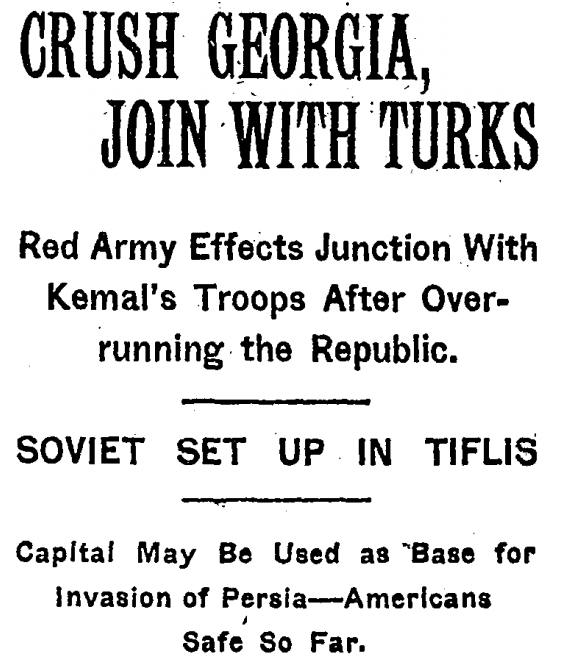
"Red Army Effects Junction With Kemal's Troops After Overrunning the Republic" (The New York Times, 20 February 1921)

Despite Moscow's military successes, the Caucasus front had become precarious. Armenians, aided by the Red Army involvement in Georgia, had revolted, retaking Yerevan on 18 February 1921. In the North Caucasus, Dagestani rebels continued to fight the Soviets. The Turkish occupation of Georgia's territories implied the near certainty of a Soviet–Turkish confrontation, and the Georgians repeatedly refused to capitulate. On 2 March, Lenin, fearing an unfavourable outcome for the Georgian campaign, sent his "warm greetings to Soviet Georgia", clearly revealing his desire to end hostilities as quickly as possible. He emphasised the "tremendous importance of devising an acceptable compromise for a bloc" with the Mensheviks. On 8 March, the Georgian Revkom reluctantly proposed a coalition government, which the Mensheviks refused.

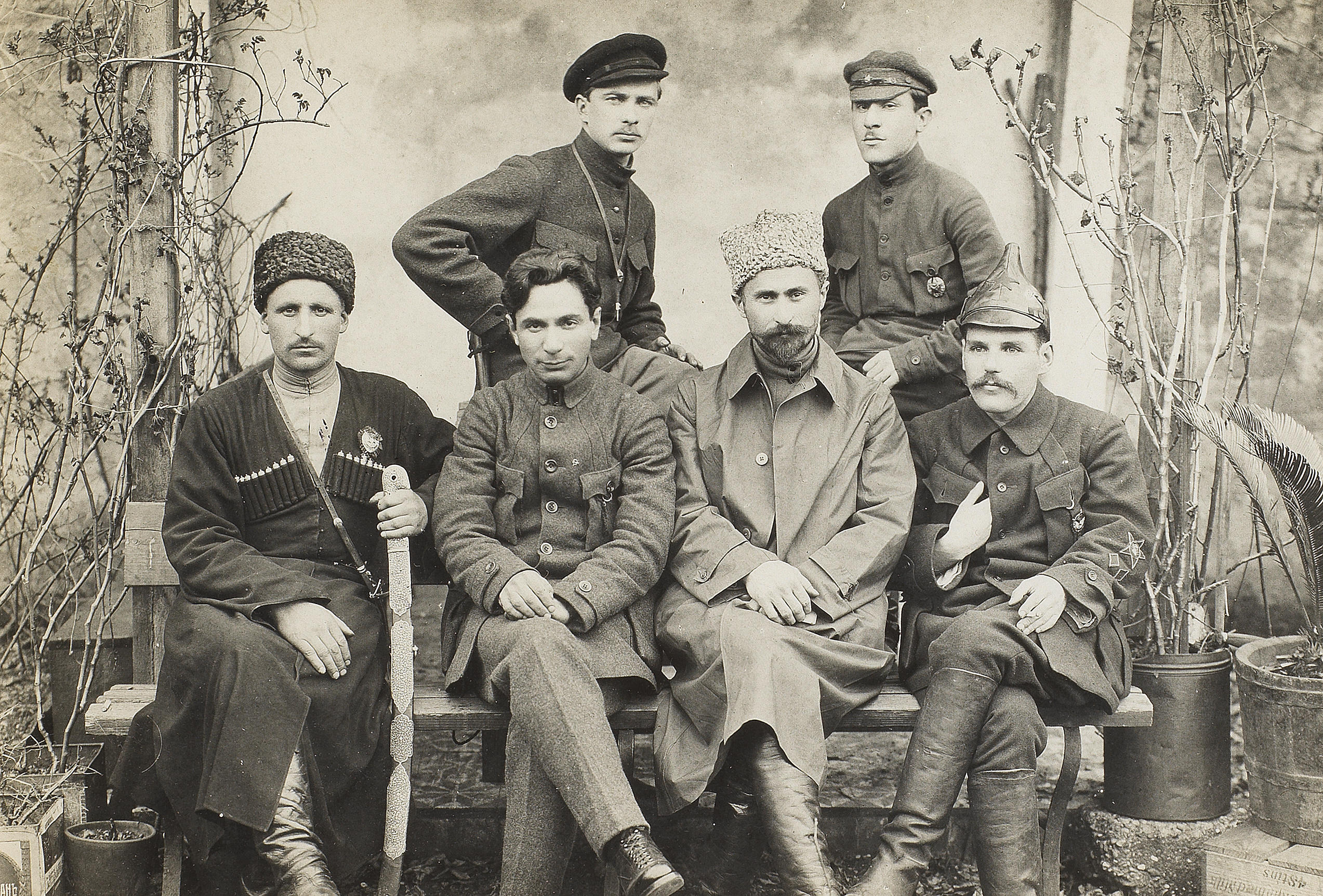
Red Army commanders in Batum in March 1921

When the Turkish authorities proclaimed the annexation of Batumi on 16 March, the Georgian government was forced to choose. Their hopes for French or British intervention had already vanished. France had never considered sending an expeditionary force, and the United Kingdom had ordered the Royal Navy not to intervene; furthermore, on 16 March the British and Soviet governments signed a trade agreement, in which Prime Minister Lloyd George effectively promised to refrain from anti-Soviet activities in all territories of the former Russian Empire. Simultaneously, Soviet Russia and the Grand National Assembly of Turkey signed a treaty of friendship in Moscow, under which Ardahan and Artvin were awarded to Turkey, which renounced its claims to Batumi.

The Turks, despite the terms of the treaty, were reluctant to evacuate Batumi and continued its occupation. Fearing permanent loss of the city to Turkey, Georgian leaders agreed to talks with the Revkom. In Kutaisi, Georgian Defence Minister Grigol Lordkipanidze and the Soviet plenipotentiary Avel Enukidze arranged an armistice on 17 March and, on 18 March, an agreement that allowed the Red Army to advance in force to Batumi.

Amid the ongoing Turkish-Soviet consultations in Moscow, the armistice with the Mensheviks allowed the Bolsheviks to act indirectly from behind the scenes, through several thousand soldiers of the Georgian National Army mobilised at the outskirts of Batumi and inclined to fight for the city. On 18 March, the remaining Georgian army under General Mazniashvili attacked Batumi and was engaged in heavy street fighting with the Turkish army. While the battle raged, the Menshevik government boarded an Italian vessel and sailed into exile escorted by French warships. The battle ended on 19 March with the port and most of the city in Georgian hands. That same day, Mazniashvili surrendered the city to the Revkom, and Zhloba's cavalry entered Batumi to reinforce Bolshevik authority there.

The violent events in Batumi halted the Russian-Turkish negotiations, and it was not until 26 September that the talks between Turkey and the Soviets, nominally including also the representatives of the Armenian, Azerbaijani and Georgian SSRs, finally reopened in Kars. The Treaty of Kars, signed on 13 October, contained the provisions agreed upon in March and some other new territorial settlements. In exchange for Artvin, Ardahan, and Kars, Turkey abandoned its claims to Batumi, whose largely Muslim Georgian population was to be granted autonomy within the Georgian SSR.

== Aftermath ==
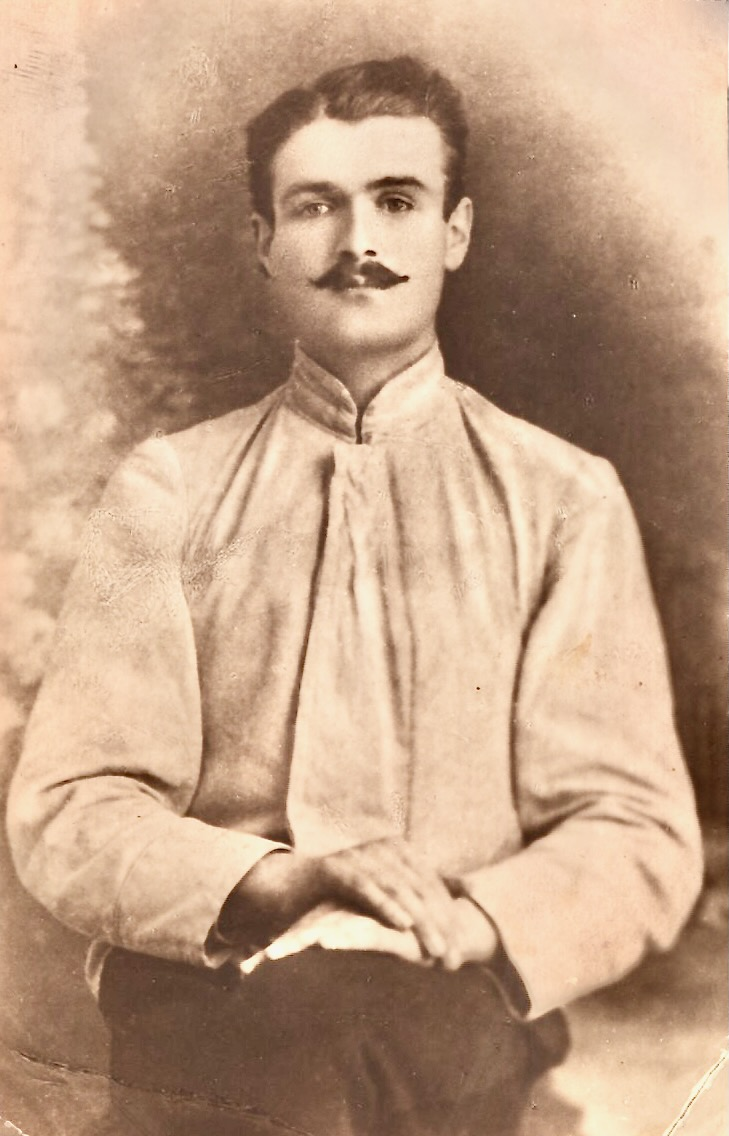
Jason Kereselidze was executed for resisting Soviet occupation, but his brother Leo Kereselidze continued Georgian nationalist activities in exile.

Despite the Georgian government's emigration and the demobilisation of the National Army, pockets of guerrilla resistance still remained in the mountains and some rural areas. The invasion of Georgia sparked serious controversy among the Bolsheviks themselves. The newly established Communist government initially offered unexpectedly mild terms to their former opponents who still remained in the country. Lenin also favored a policy of conciliation in Georgia, where a pro-Bolshevik revolt did not enjoy the popular backing claimed for it, and the population was solidly anti-Bolshevik. In 1922, a strong public resentment over the forcible Sovietization, indirectly reflected in the opposition of Soviet Georgian authorities to Moscow's centralising policies promoted by Dzerzhinsky, Stalin and Ordzhonikidze. The problem, known in modern historical writing as the "Georgian Affair", became one of the major points at issue between Stalin and Trotsky in the last years of Lenin's leadership and found its reflection in "Lenin's Political Testament".

The world largely neglected the Soviet takeover of Georgia. On 27 March 1921, the exiled Georgian leadership issued an appeal from their temporary offices in Istanbul to "all socialist parties and workers' organisations" worldwide, protesting the invasion of Georgia. Beyond passionate editorials in some Western newspapers and calls for action from Georgian sympathisers such as Sir Oliver Wardrop, the international response to events in Georgia was silence.

In Georgia, a resistance to the Bolshevik regime and occasional outbreaks of guerrilla warfare evolved into a major rebellion in August 1924. Its failure and the ensuing wave of large-scale repressions orchestrated by the emerging Soviet security officer, Lavrentiy Beria, heavily demoralized the Georgian society and exterminated its most active pro-independence part. Within a week, from 29 August to 5 September 1924, 12,578 Georgians were executed and over 20,000 exiled to Siberia. Manuscripts, art and architecture were seized or destroyed. From then on, no major overt attempt challenged Soviet authority in the country until a new generation of anti-Soviet movements emerged in 1956.

== Assessment ==
Soviet historians characterise the Red Army invasion of Georgia as part of the Russian Civil War. In early Soviet historiography, the Georgian episode was considered a "revolutionary war" and was described as such in the first edition of the Great Soviet Encyclopedia. Later, the term "revolutionary war" fell out of fashion among Soviet writers, partly because it was hard to distinguish from "aggression" under the Soviets' own definition of the word. Hence, later Soviet histories framed it differently. The Red Army intervention, according to the official Soviet version, responded to a plea for help that followed an armed rebellion by Georgia's peasants and workers. This version exculpated Soviet Russia from any charge of aggression against Georgia by pointing out that the Georgians themselves asked Moscow to send the Red Army into their country, so as to remove their existing government and replace it with a communist one.

Using its control over education and the media, the Soviet Union successfully created an image of a popular socialist revolution in Georgia. Most Georgian historians were not allowed to consult Spetskhran, special restricted-access library collections and archival reserves that also covered the "unacceptable" events in Soviet history, particularly those that could be interpreted as imperialist or contradicted a concept of a popular uprising against the Menshevik government.

The 1980s wave of Mikhail Gorbachev's glasnost ("openness") policy refuted an old Soviet version of the 1921–1924 events. The first Soviet historian to attempt, in 1988, to revise the hitherto accepted interpretation of the Soviet-Georgian war was a notable Georgian scholar, Akaki Surguladze, ironically the same historian whose 1982 monograph described the alleged Georgian worker revolt as a truly historical event.

Under strong public pressure, the Presidium of the Supreme Soviet of the Georgian SSR set up, on 2 June 1989, a special commission for investigation of legal aspects of the 1921 events. The commission came to the conclusion that "the [Soviet Russian] deployment of troops in Georgia and seizure of its territory was, from a legal point of view, a military interference, intervention, and occupation with the aim of overthrowing the existing political order." At an extraordinary session of the Supreme Soviet of the Georgian SSR convened on 9 March 1990, the Soviet invasion of Georgia was officially denounced as "an occupation and effective annexation of Georgia by Soviet Russia."

Modern Georgian politicians and some observers have repeatedly drawn parallels between the 1921 events and Russia's policy toward Georgia, as well as Western Europe's reluctance to confront Russia over Georgia in the 2000s, especially during the August 2008 war.

== Legacy ==
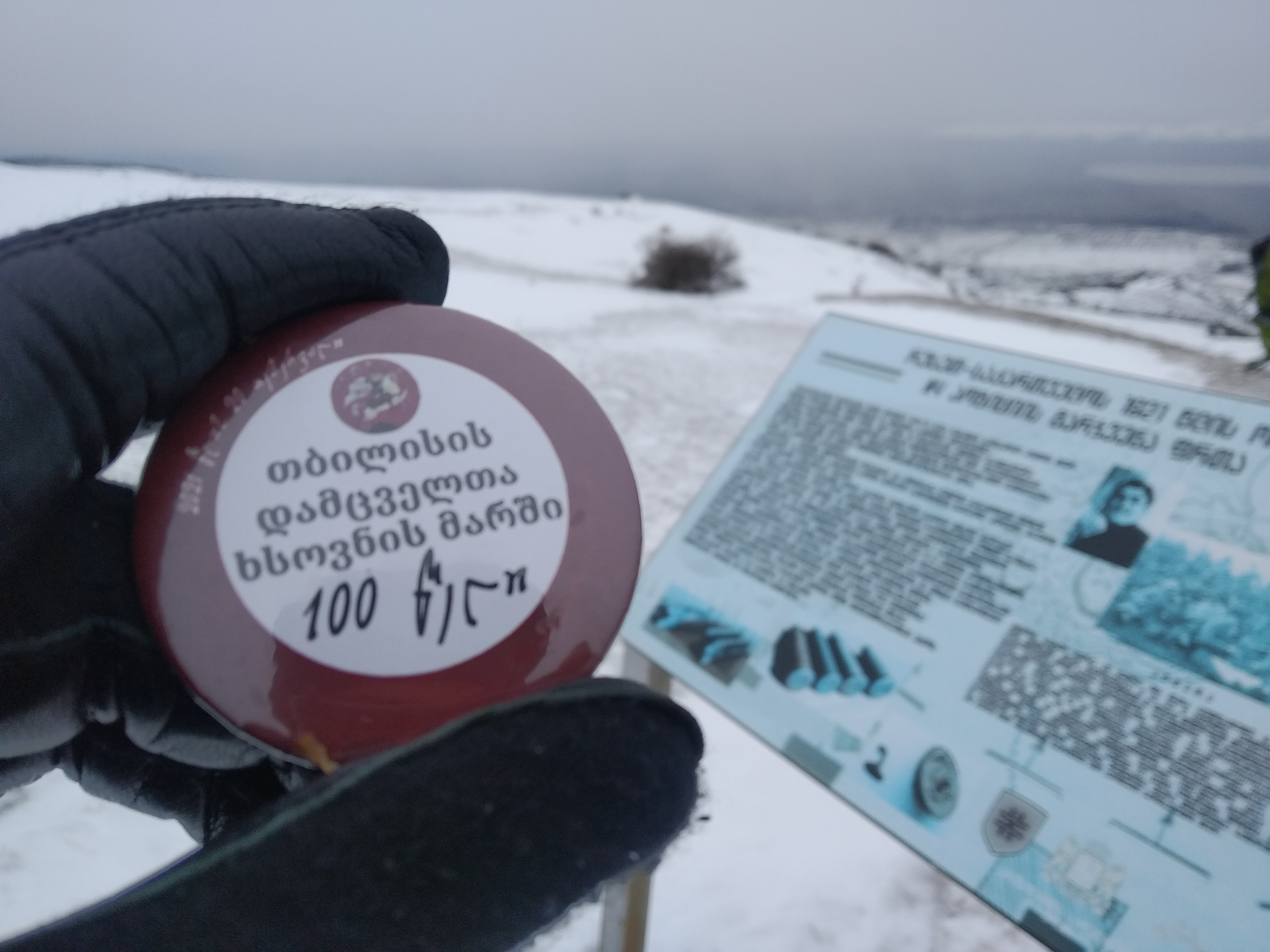
Tbilisi Defenders Memorial March in 2021 – the annual march along the frontline.

Since July 21, 2010, Georgia commemorates February 25 as the Soviet Occupation Day. The Georgian parliament voted in favor of the government's initiative. The decision, endorsed unanimously by the Parliament of Georgia, instructs the government to organise various memorial events every February 25 and to fly the national flag half-mast to commemorate the hundreds of thousands of victims of political repressions of the Communist occupation regime.

== See also ==
- List of states and regions involved in the Russian Civil War
- Bibliography of the Russian Revolution and Civil War
- Outline of the Russian Revolution and Civil War
- Svaneti uprising of 1921
- Soviet invasion of Armenia
- Soviet invasion of Azerbaijan
- Turkish invasion of Armenia

== Bibliography ==
- Allen, WED (May 1927). "New Political Boundaries in the Caucasus". Geographical Journal. 69 (5): 430–441. Bibcode:1927GeogJ..69..430A. doi:10.2307/1782090. JSTOR 1782090.
- (in French) Andrew Andersen et George Partskhaladze (1/2009), La guerre soviéto-géorgienne et la soviétisation de la Géorgie (février-mars 1921). Revue historique des Armées, 254: 67–75
- Blank, Stephen (1993), "The Soviet conquest of Georgia", Central Asian Survey, 12 (1): 33–46, doi:10.1080/02634939308400798
- Anita L. Burdett, ed. (1 June 2001). "Caucasian Boundaries. Documents and Maps. 1802–1946". Central Asian Survey. 20 (2): 229–249. doi:10.1080/02634930120073523. S2CID 153281877.
- (in Russian) Борисова, И.Д. Российско-грузинские межреспубликанские связи 1917–1922 гг. / И.Д. Борисова // PANDECTAE: сб. ст. преподавателей, аспирантов и соискателей каф. гос.-правовых дисциплин юрид. фак. ВГПУ. – Владимир: Изд-во ВГПУ, 2004.
- Carr, E.H. (1950), The Bolshevik Revolution 1917–1923, vol. I, London: MacMillan & Co.
- Gachechiladze, Revaz (2012), "Geopolitics and foreign powers in the modern history of Georgia: Comparing 1918–21 and 1991–2010", in Jones, Stephen F. (ed.), The Making of Modern Georgia, 1918–2012: The first Georgian Republic and its successors, New York City: Routledge, pp. 17–34, ISBN 978-0-41-559238-3
- Hovannisian, Richard G. (1996), The Republic of Armenia, Vol. IV: Between Crescent and Sickle, Berkeley, California: University of California Press, ISBN 0-520-08804-2
- Stephen F. Jones (October 1988), "The Establishment of Soviet Power in Transcaucasia: The Case of Georgia 1921–1928", Soviet Studies, 40 (4): 616–639, doi:10.1080/09668138808411783, JSTOR 151812
- Kazemzadeh, Firuz (1951), The Struggle for Transcaucasia (1917–1921), New York City: Philosophical Library
- Kautsky, Karl: Georgia: A Social-Democratic Peasant Republic - Impressions And Observations. International Bookshops Ltd., London [etc.] 1921.
- Keun, Odette (1924). In the Land of the Golden Fleece: Through Independent Menchevist Georgia. London: John Lane.
- Lang, David Marshall (1962), A Modern History of Soviet Georgia, New York City: Grove Press
- Smith, Jeremy (May 1998), "The Georgian Affair of 1922. Policy Failure, Personality Clash or Power Struggle?", Europe-Asia Studies, 50 (3): 519–544, doi:10.1080/09668139808412550
- Suny, Ronald Grigor (1994), The Making of the Georgian Nation (Second ed.), Bloomington, Indiana: Indiana University Press, ISBN 978-0-253-20915-3
- Trotsky, Leon: Between Red and White: A Study of Some Fundamental Questions of Revolution, with Particular Reference to Georgia. Hyperion Press, Westport, Conn. 1975, ISBN 0-88355-189-6
- Communist Takeover and Occupation of Georgia. "Special Report No. 6 of the Select Committee on Communist Aggression", United States House of Representatives, 83rd Congress, 2nd session. 31 December 1954. Washington, D.C.: U.S. Government Printing Office. 1955.
- (in Russian) "Оккупация и фактическая аннексия Грузии". Документы и материалы. Сост. А. Ментешашвили, ред. А. Сургуладзе, Тбилиси, 1990.
