= Ak'ak'i Meipariani =

Soviet fencer

Personal information
- Born: 28 February 1918 Tbilisi, Georgia
- Died: 31 December 1995 (aged 77) Tbilisi, Georgia

Sport
- Sport: Fencing

Ak'ak'i Meipariani (Georgian: აკაკი მეიფარიანი; 28 February 1918 – 31 December 1995) was a Soviet Olympic fencer. He competed in the team épée event at the 1952 Summer Olympics.
