= Akatyevo =

Akatyevo (Russian: Акатьево) is the name of several rural localities in Russia:

- Akatyevo, Altai Krai, a selo in Nizhneneninsky Selsoviet of Soltonsky District in Altai Krai; 52°46′N 86°28′E
- Akatyevo, Klinsky District, Moscow Oblast, a village under the administrative jurisdiction of the Town of Klin in Klinsky District of Moscow Oblast; 56°18′N 36°50′E
- Akatyevo, Kolomensky District, Moscow Oblast, a selo in Akatyevskoye Rural Settlement of Kolomensky District in Moscow Oblast; 54°59′N 38°45′E
- Akatyevo, Vologda Oblast, a village in Bechevinsky Selsoviet of Belozersky District in Vologda Oblast
