= Akaki Surguladze =

Akaki Surguladze (Georgian: აკაკი სურგულაძე) (1913–1991) was a Georgian historian. He was the first Soviet scholar, who attempted, in 1988, to revise the hitherto commonly accepted official Soviet version of the Soviet-Georgian War which led to the forcible Sovietization of Georgia in 1921.
