= Akatovo =

Akatovo (Russian: Акатово) is the name of several rural localities in Russia:

- Akatovo, Dzerzhinsky District, Kaluga Oblast, a village in Dzerzhinsky District of Kaluga Oblast
- Akatovo, Kozelsky District, Kaluga Oblast, a village in Kozelsky District of Kaluga Oblast
- Akatovo, Zhukovsky District, Kaluga Oblast, a village in Zhukovsky District of Kaluga Oblast
- Akatovo, Klinsky District, Moscow Oblast, a village in Nudolskoye Rural Settlement of Klinsky District in Moscow Oblast; 56°6′N 36°35′E
- Akatovo, Ruzsky District, Moscow Oblast, a village in Ivanovskoye Rural Settlement of Ruzsky District in Moscow Oblast; 55°48′N 36°4′E
- Akatovo, Stupinsky District, Moscow Oblast, a village in Aksinyinskoye Rural Settlement of Stupinsky District in Moscow Oblast; 55°14′N 38°22′E
- Akatovo, Yegoryevsky District, Moscow Oblast, a village under the administrative jurisdiction of the Town of Yegoryevsk in Yegoryevsky District of Moscow Oblast; 55°23′N 39°8′E
- Akatovo, Pskov Oblast, a village in Ostrovsky District of Pskov Oblast
- Akatovo, Demidovsky District, Smolensk Oblast, a village in Peresudovskoye Rural Settlement of Demidovsky District in Smolensk Oblast
- Akatovo, Gagarinsky District, Smolensk Oblast, a village in Akatovskoye Rural Settlement of Gagarinsky District in Smolensk Oblast
- Akatovo, Tver Oblast, a village in Bologovskoye Rural Settlement of Andreapolsky District in Tver Oblast
