= Stepane Akhmeteli =

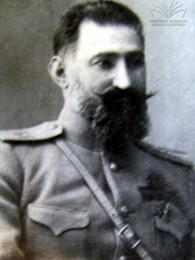

Stepane Akhmeteli (Akhmetelashvili) (Georgian: სტეფანე ახმეტელი [ახმეტელაშვილი]) (1877 – 1922) was a Georgian military commander.

Akhmeteli received his military education in Sumy (now Ukraine) and became an officer in the Imperial Russian army. He was awarded for his service during the Russo-Japanese war and World War I. He met the Russian Revolution of 1917 in the capacity of colonel of the Russian army. During Georgia's short-lived independence, Akhmeteli was promoted to major-general. He commanded an army corps, then a People's Guard in Tiflis and finally the border troops during the Soviet invasion in 1921. After sovietization, he was arrested by the Cheka and deported to Moscow. He was killed in prison in Ryazan, but officials reported his death of "typhus".

Akhmeteli's younger brother Simon (1881–1937) was a military doctor and a World War I veteran, then a member of the Constituent Assembly of Georgia from 1919 to 1921. He was executed during Joseph Stalin's Great Purge.
