= Akaki Chanturia =

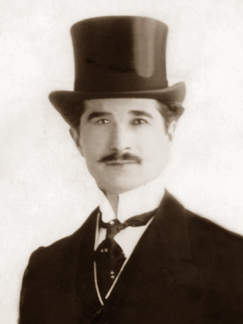
Akaki Chanturia

Akaki Chanturia (Georgian: აკაკი ჭანტურია, 1881 – 11 May 1949) was a Georgian scientist, archaeologist and ethnographer. Educated primarily in England, where he lived from 1904 to 1920, Chanturia returned to his native Samegrelo to established the Dadiani Palaces Museum in Zugdidi.

== Early life and education in England ==
Born in 1881, Chanturia attended a religious school in Senaki, a small town in Samegrelo. He could have entered the Tbilisi Theological Seminary, but instead decided to pursue his studies abroad. To achieve that goal, he moved to Batumi to work at the Rothschild factory, where he learned English and saved his pay to finance a trip to England.

Chanturia moved to London in 1904, where he worked as a private teacher of Russian. At the same time he enrolled at university in the faculty of geology. He also studied archaeology, history, cartography, ethnography, museology, philology, art and folklore, and took part in scientific and artistic visits and excursions organised by the British Museum.

Chanturia returned briefly to Georgia in 1912, where he collected a large amount of geological and paleontological material in Samegrelo. He used this material to complete his thesis, Geology of Georgia, published in 1919. Upon returning to England in 1913, he studied at King's College, where he received a Bachelor of Science, and at the Royal College of Art.

== Return to Georgia ==
Chanturia returned to Georgia permanently in 1920, and settled in Senaki with his wife, an Englishwoman named Kate Walter Ball, whom he taught Georgian and Mingrelian. He often travelled to Tbilisi to work at the newly established Tbilisi State University, and at various museums and libraries. He declined an offer to work for the Ministry of Foreign Affairs, as his main goal was now the establishment of a museum in Samegrelo.

This museum opened on 1 May 1921 in the Dadiani Palace in Zugdidi. Objects from the other mansions of the Dadiani family, and of the private collection of Prince Achille Murat-Dadiani, were transferred to the newly created museum.

From 1937, Chanturia was persecuted by the Soviet authorities. In 1940, he was dismissed from the museum he had created. He died in Zugdidi on May 11, 1949.
