= Tsalenjikha Municipality =

- Municipality
- The Enguri Valley

- Flag Seal

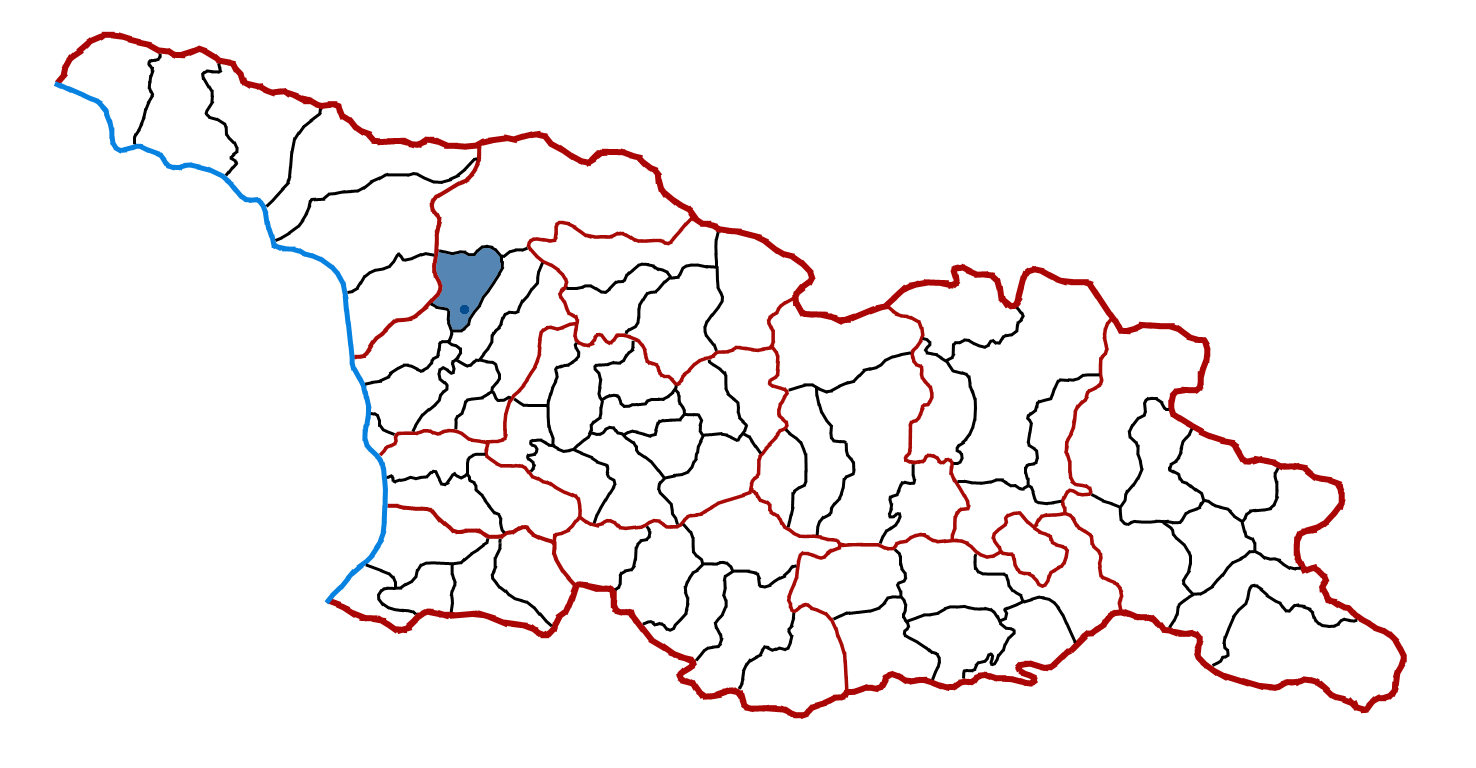
- Location of the municipality within Georgia
- Country: Georgia
- Region: Samegrelo-Zemo Svaneti
- Administrative centre: Tsalenjikha

Government
  - Body: Tsalenjikha Municipal Assembly
  - Mayor: SergI Kvaratskhelia (SFG)

Area
  - Total: 646.7 km^{2} (249.7 sq mi)

Population (2014)
  - Total: 26.158
  - Density: 40.4/km^{2} (105/sq mi)

Population by ethnicity
  - Georgians: 99,56 %
  - Russians: 0,27 %
  - Ukrainians: 0,08 %
- Time zone: UTC+4 (Georgian Standard Time)
- Website: tsalenjikha.gov.ge

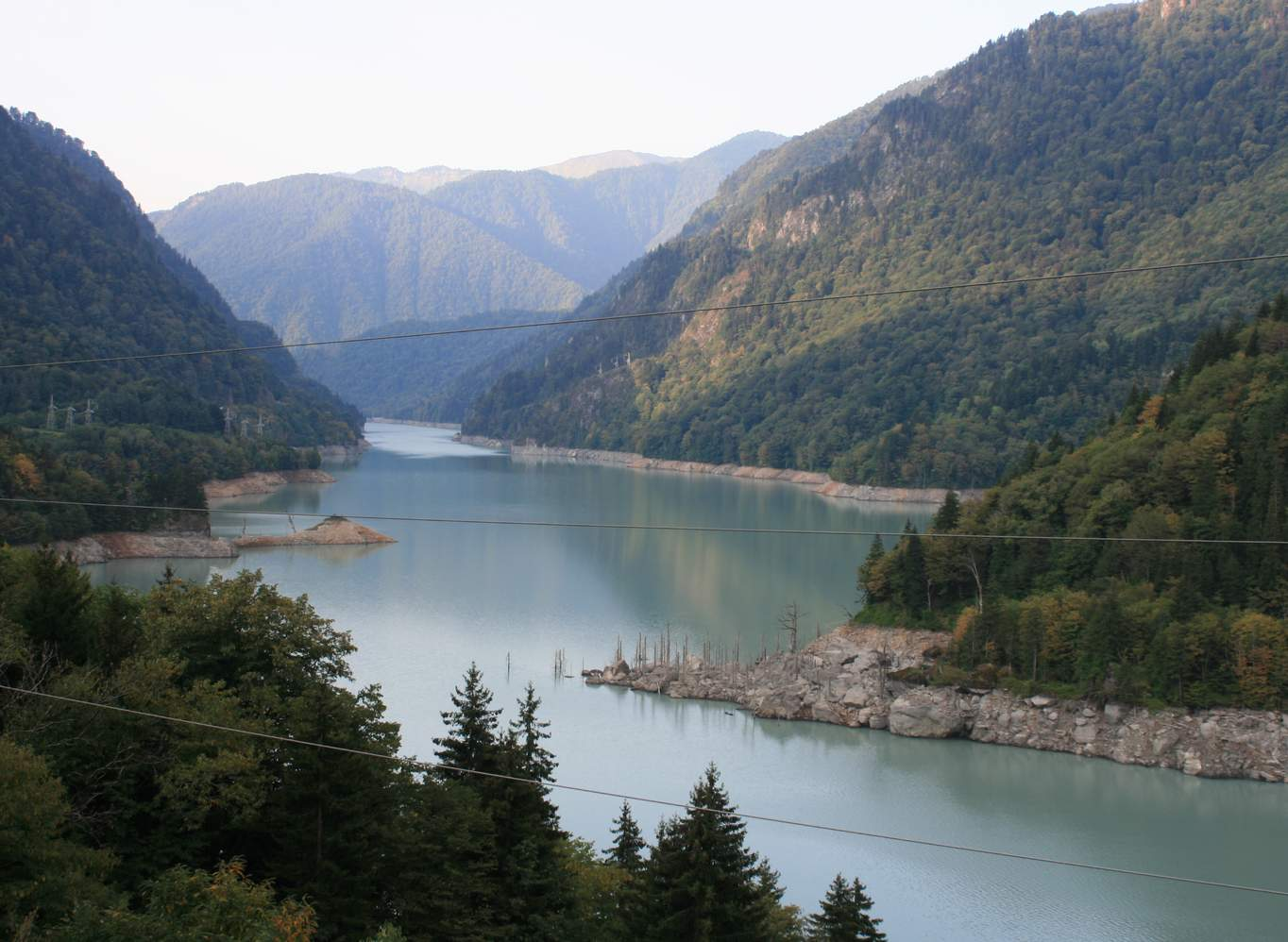
Jvari reservoir

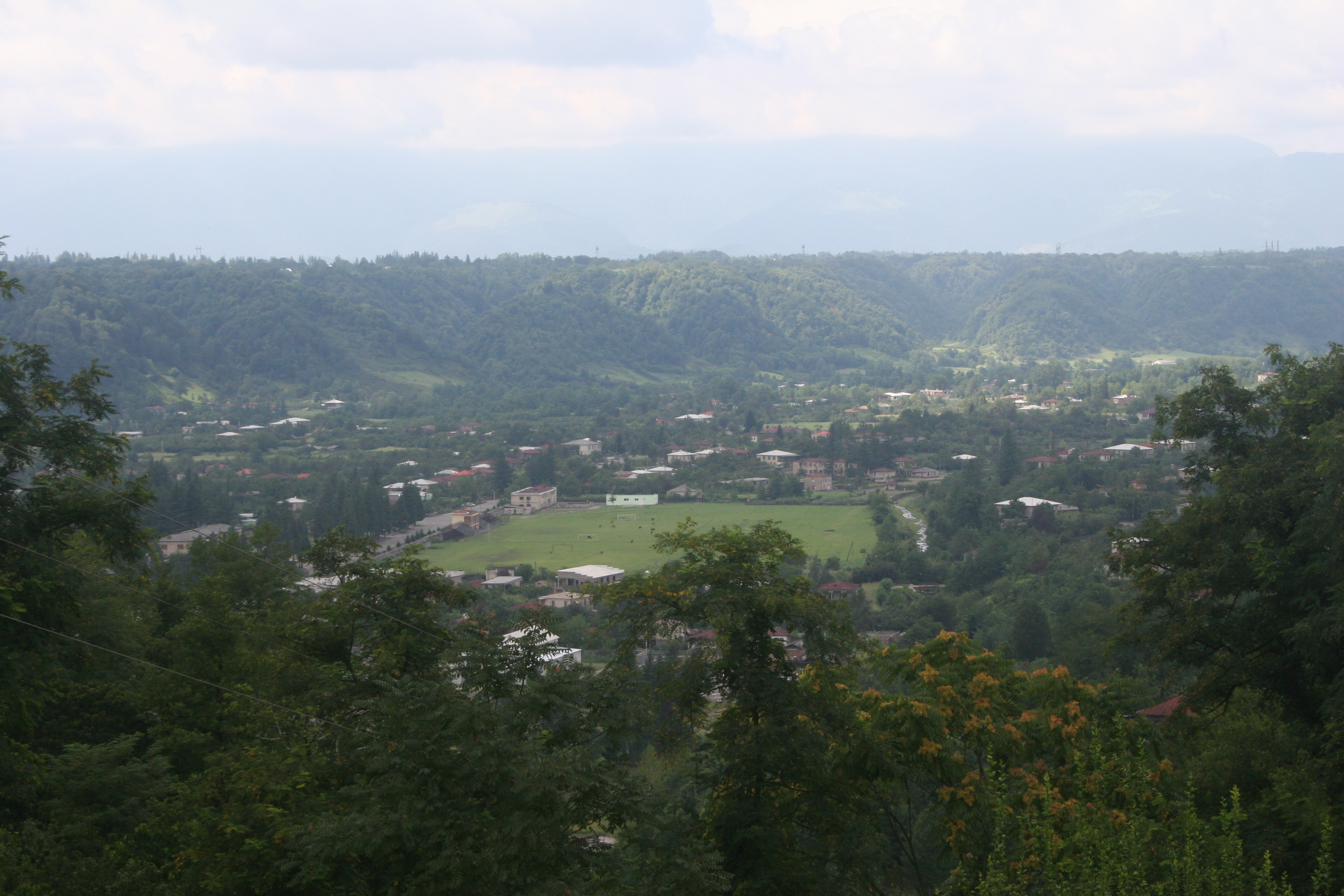
Tsalenjikha Stadium

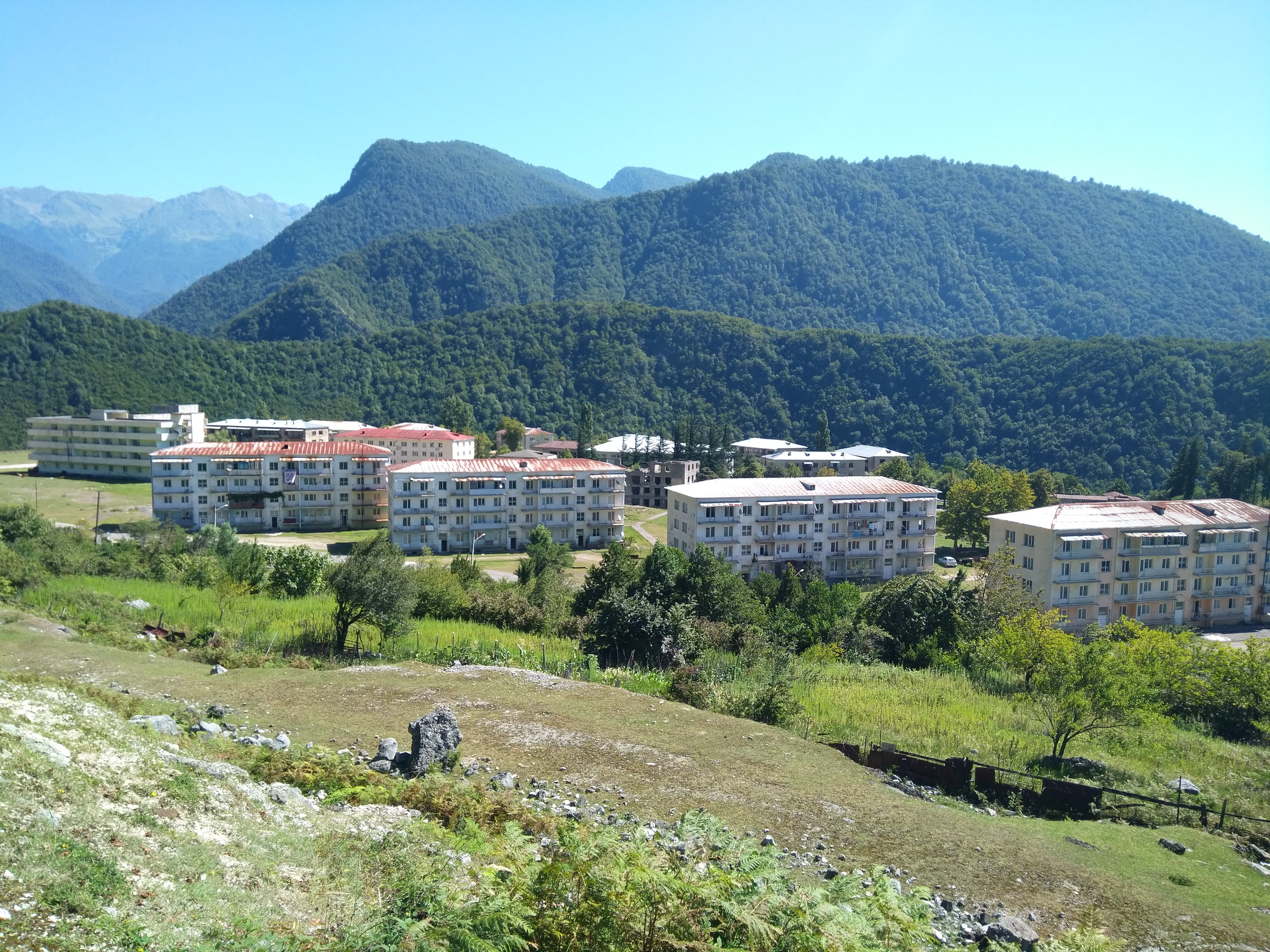
Village of Potskho Etseri

Tsalenjikha (Georgian: წალენჯიხის მუნიციპალიტეტი, Ċalenjixis municiṗaliṫeṫi) is a district of Georgia, in the region of Samegrelo-Zemo Svaneti. Its main town is Tsalenjikha. Tsalenjikha Municipality is located in the valleys of the Enguri and Chanistskali rivers, the area is 646.7 km2, the population is 26,158 people (2014). The municipality includes 14 administrative units, including 2 cities Tsalenjikha and Jvari.

== History ==
Tsalenjikha, Megrelian "Tsendikha", Chanistskali Megrelian "Tsentskari" River and such names of the geographical point are confirmed by both Georgian and foreign sources. Tsalenjikha and its environs were the original settlement of western Georgian tribes.

It is known from historical sources that the territory of the municipality was inhabited even when people used stone and bronze tools. Western Georgian tribes have been living on the territory of Tsalenjikha since that time. This is indicated by the names of this point and the river "Chelenjikha", "Tsendikha" Tsalenjikha.

In the 10th and 11th centuries, Tsalenjikha was an important settlement, as evidenced by such a large and important church as the Church of the Transfiguration. From this time on, the importance of Tsalenjikha gradually increased so that by the 13th and 14th centuries it became the only residence of the Dadiani. Here they had a palace, utensils (treasures) and apparently an ancestral tomb as well. Such an increase in the importance of Tsalenjikha led to the relocation of one of the most important dioceses of Odisha to Tsalenjikha in the 14th century. The relocation of the episcopal center to Tsalenjikha led to large-scale construction, as well as the painting of the Tsalenjikha Church during the 14th century during the reign of Vamek Dadiani (1384–1396).

Ak. Simon Janashia undoubtedly believes that 'Tseni' or 'Tsani' 'was one of the tribes of the Chanuri-Megrelian branch and not their own Zani'. (Tsen-Dikha) and the river that flowed into the castle (Tsen-water).

Materials about Tsalenjikha's past are taken from Inga Lortkipanidze's book - Tsalenjikha Painting, by Simon Janashia and Shota Meskhia.

In 2001, the village of Lia was the site of the Lia radiological accident.

== Historical sites ==
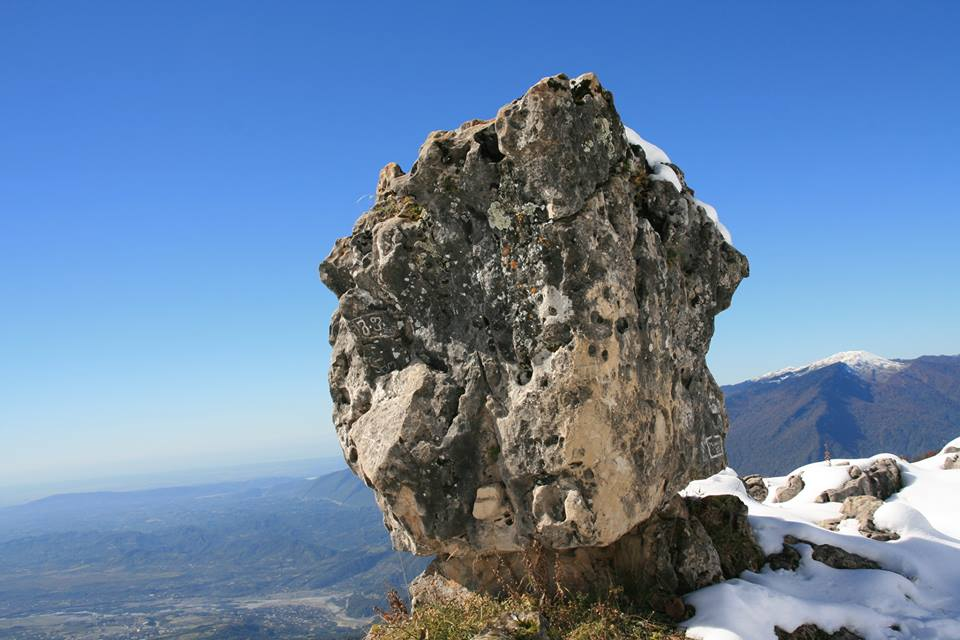
Kuakantsalia Rock

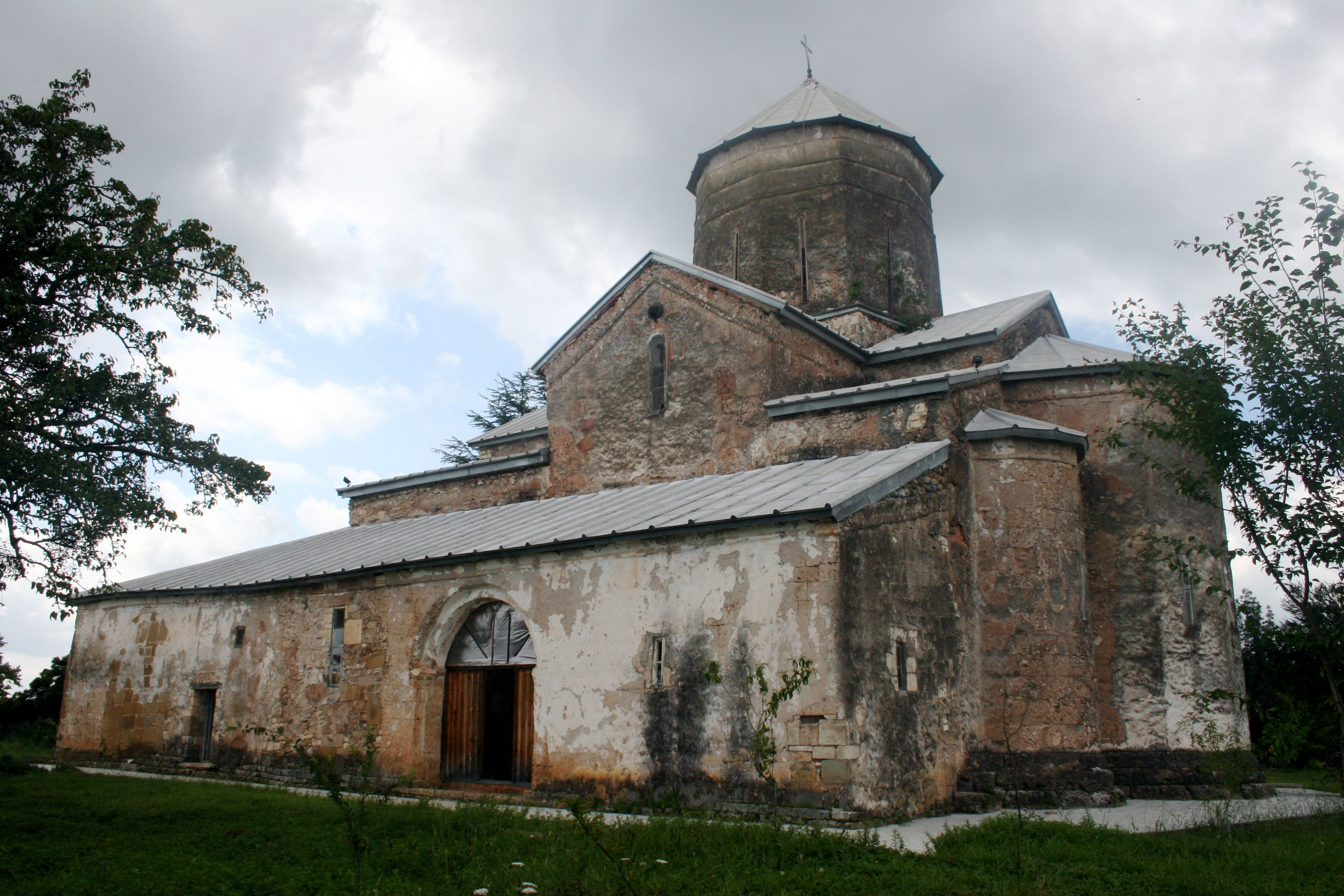
Tsalenjikha Cathedral

- Tsalenjikha Cathedral
- The ruins of Gamajistsikhe
- Katskhara Fortress
- Samikao Cave
- Episcopal Church
- Jagiri Castle
- St. Barbara's Church
- Uluria Castle
- "Mamukia Tower"
- "Dilakirse" fortress
- The ruins of Skuri Castle
- The ruins of Lesale Castle
- Jgali conical tower
- St. Nicholas Church in Jgali
- Church of the All-Holy Mother of God on the Cross
- Omune Castle-Tower

== Politics ==
Tsalenjikha Municipal Assembly (Georgian: წალენჯიხის საკრებულო) is a representative body in Tsalenjikha Municipality. The council assembles into session regularly, to consider subject matters such as code changes, utilities, taxes, city budget, oversight of Municipal government and more. Tsalenjikha Sakrebulo is elected every four year. The last election was held in October 2021.

Tsalenjikha was one of only seven municipalities where ruling Georgian Dream party failed to gain a majority. After several attempts, the opposition parties UNM, For Georgia and Lelo agreed on a chairman of the Sakrebulo, four weeks after neighboring municipality Chkhorotsqu did the same.

Party	Seats (27)	Current Municipal Assembly
Georgian Dream	11	
United National Movement	11	
For Georgia	3	
Lelo	1	
Independent	1 (Note: Nana Lemonjava - split from For Georgia.)	

=== Results in local election ===
Municipal Assembly

Party	Party list			Constituency			Total seats	+/–
Party	Votes	%	Seats	Votes	%	Seats	Total seats	+/–
United National Movement	5,439	37.78	7			4	11	▲8
Georgian Dream	5,008	34.79	7			4	11	▼13
For Georgia	2,730	18.96	3			1	4	New
Lelo	482	3.35	1				1	New
European Georgia	310	2.15						▼2
Alliance of Patriots	107	0.74						▼1
Labour Party	102	0.71						Steady
Strategy Aghmashenebeli	95	0.66						Steady
New Political Center - Girchi	75	0.52						New
Other parties	47	0.36						
Invalid/blank votes								
Total	14,395	100	18			9	27	
Registered voters/turnout	28,737	51.11						
Source: CEC

Mayor

Candidate	Party	First round		Second round	
Candidate	Party	Votes	%	Votes	%
Giorgi Kharchilava	United National Movement	5,657	39.68	7,248	51.10
Goga Gulordava	Georgian Dream	5,450	38.23	6,937	48.90
Khvicha Mebonia	For Georgia	2,720	19.08		
Tamari Belkania	Lelo	429	3.01		
Total		14,256	100.00	14,185	100.00
Registered voters/turnout		28,737	–	28,737	–
Source: CEC, CEC

=== Municipal Assembly 2017-2021 ===
Party	Seats (30)	Current Municipal Assembly
Georgian Dream	24	
United National Movement	3	
European Georgia	2	
Alliance of Patriots	1	

== Notable natives ==
- Meliton Kantaria (1920 – 1993) – was a Georgian sergeant of the Soviet Army credited with having hoisted a Soviet flag over the Reichstag on 30 April 1945.
- Terenti Graneli (1897 – 1934) – was a noted Georgian poet.
- Aneta Dadeshkeliani (1872–1922) – was a Georgian poet, educator and social reformer.
- Nikoloz Shengelaia (1903 – 1943) – was a Soviet Georgian film director.
- Leo Kiacheli (1884 – 1963) – was a Georgian novelist, short story writer, and journalist.
- Badri Kvaratskhelia (b. 1965) – a former Georgian footballer.
- Givi Kvaratskhelia (b. 1979) – a retired Georgian footballer.
- Georgi Tsurtsumia (b. 1980) – a wrestler who competed in the Men's Greco-Roman 120 kg at the 2004 Summer Olympics and won the silver medal.
- Khvicha Kvaratskhelia (b. 2001) – is a Georgian professional footballer who plays as a winger for the Italian Serie A side S.S.C. Napoli and the Georgia national team.

== See also ==
- List of municipalities in Georgia (country)
