= Lugela Valley =

Valley in Georgia

- Location within Samegrelo-Zemo Svaneti Location within Georgia

Geography
- Country: Georgia
- Coordinates: 42°39′N 42°13′E
- Interactive map of Lugela Valley

The Lugela Valley is a valley in the country of Georgia formed by the Khobistsqali river. It is part of the Chkhorotsqu Municipality. Lugela Valley is known for mineral waters with a reputation for medicinal properties and contains the Shuru Ghumu (Always Dark in the Megrelian language), the 3rd largest cave in the Caucasus. The valley has various recreational sites including picnic sites and swimming holes.

The nearby village of Ganarjiis Mukhuri is used by visitors to the valley and has a hotel.
