= Potskhoetseri =

Potskhoetseri ფოცხოეწერი
- Village
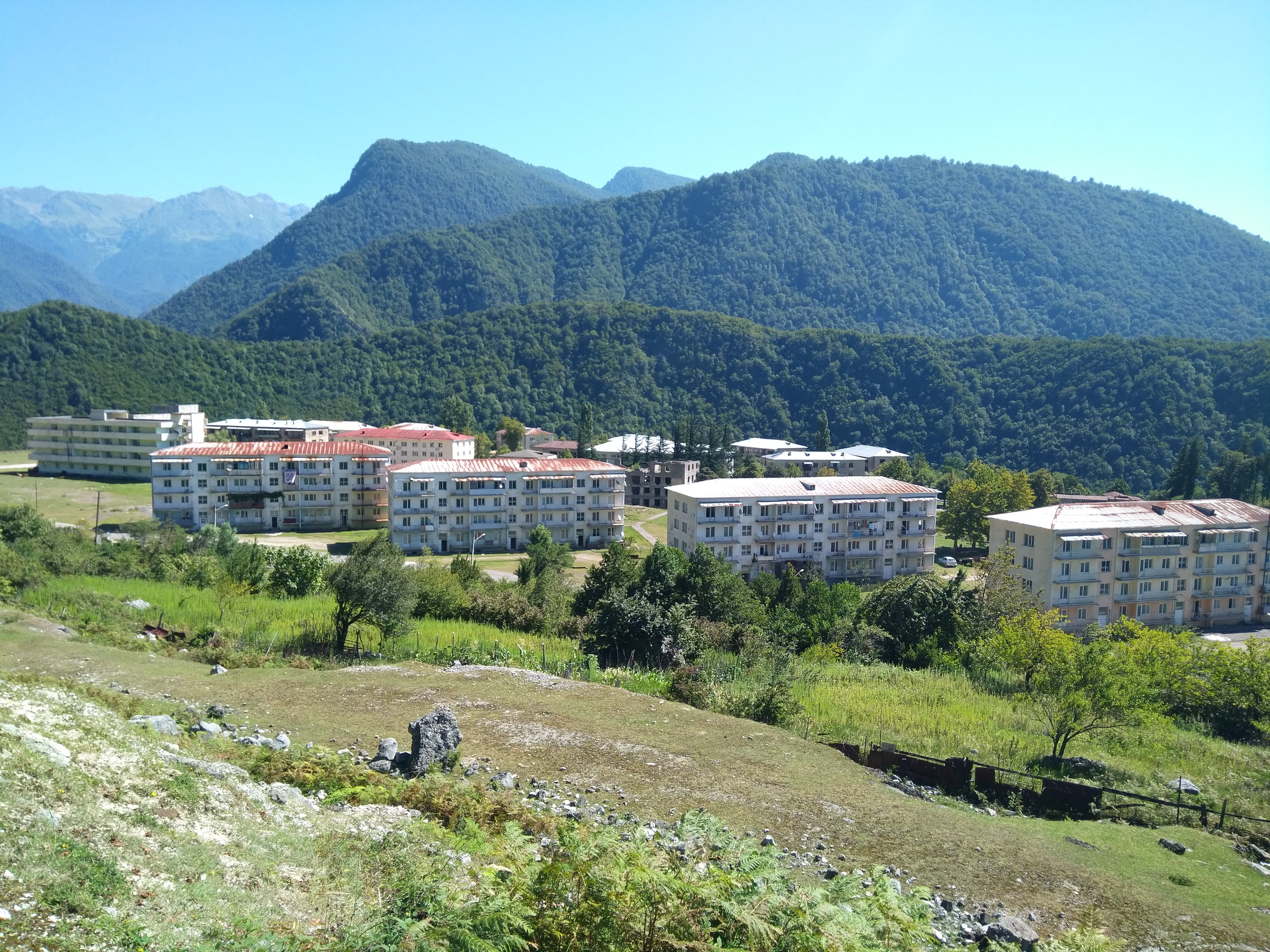
- Potskhoetseri, Tsalenjikha Municipality, Georgia

- Location in Georgia Potskhoetseri (Samegrelo-Zemo Svaneti)
- Coordinates: 42°44′44″N 42°02′17″E
- Country: Georgia
- Mkhare: Samegrelo-Zemo Svaneti
- Municipality: Tsalenjikha
- Elevation: 820 ft (250 m)

Population (2014)
  - Total: 306
- Time zone: UTC+4 (Georgian Time)

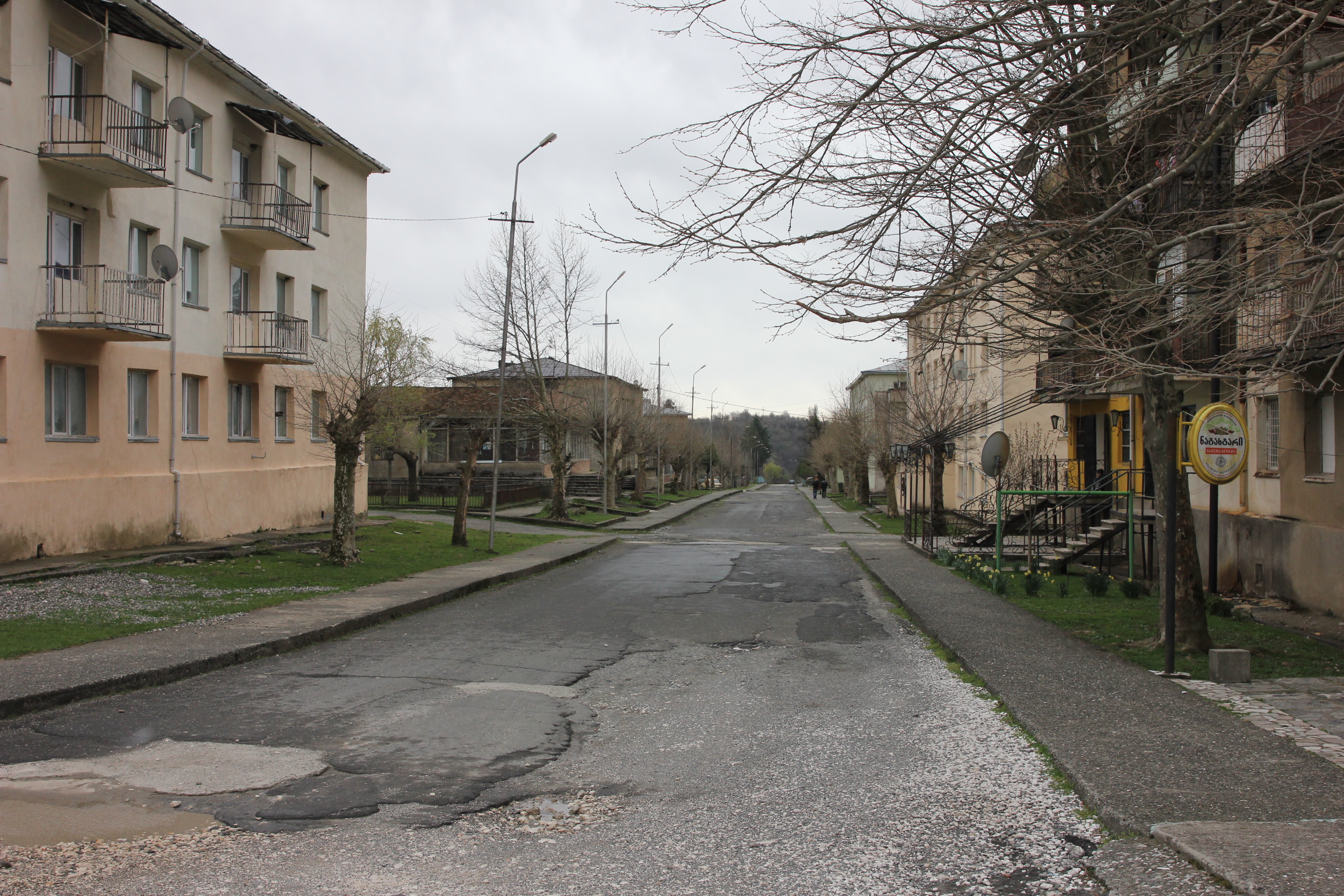
Streets of Potskhoetseri

Potskhetseri (Georgian ფოცხოეწერი) is a village near the Enguri Dam in the Tsalenjikha Municipality of Samegrelo-Zemo Svaneti region of western Georgia. It previously had an aerial lift to bring workers up to the dam. Situated 22 km east of the city Tsalenjikha.
