= Eleonora Archaia =

Georgian politician

Eleonora Archaia ელეონორა არჩაია

Member of the Kutaisi City Assembly
- Incumbent
- Assumed office December 3, 2021
- In office 2017–2021
- Constituency: Kakhianauri (7th district)

Vice-Chair of the Georgian Dream Caucus
- In office 2017–2021

Personal details
- Born: Eleonora Archaia; July 31, 1967 (age 59) Narazeni, Samegrelo region, Georgian SSR, Soviet Union
- Party: For Georgia (2021-present); Georgian Dream (2017-2021)
- Spouse: Zaal Tsirekidze (m. 1990)
- Children: 5
- Education: Akaki Tsereteli State University (LL.B.)

Eleonora (Eliso) Archaia (Georgian: ელეონორა (ელისო) არჩაია; born July 31, 1967), is a Georgian politician and businesswoman, who is currently serving in Kutaisi City Assembly. She was first elected in 2017. She is a member of the For Georgia party. In addition to her role on the council, she also leads the local party chapter in Kutaisi and heads the women’s wing in the Imereti region.

== Early life and career ==
Eleonora Archaia was born in the small village of Narazeni in the Samegrelo region. Her father, Jondi Archaia, was a factory worker, and her mother, Neli Logua, is a former school teacher. Archaia is the third of four daughters. She spent her early years in Narazeni, where she graduated from Narazeni public school in 1984. That same year, she moved to Kutaisi, where she studied at the Alexander Tsulukidze Kutaisi State Pedagogical Institute, in the Faculty of Methodology of Preschool Education and Psychology, from 1984 to 1988. During perestroika, Archaia and her husband established a food processing factory in Kazakhstan and lived there for several years. From 1996 to 1998, she worked as a psychologist at the Kutaisi Economic Lyceum. From 1998 to 2002, she studied Law at Akaki Tsereteli State University. Shortly after, she left Kutaisi and moved to Tbilisi with her family. From 2002 to 2005, she worked at the Ministry of Justice of Georgia, as an advisor to the Human Resources Department. From 2005 to 2017, she held numerous positions in the restaurant and hospitality business and ran a family-owned restaurant chain.

== Political career ==
In August 2017, Archaia announced that she would run for the Kutaisi City Council seat in the 2017 local election, as a candidate of the ruling Georgian Dream party in the Kakhianouri electoral district. She won her seat in the general election, with 49.9% of the vote. Shortly after the election, she was assigned to the Property Management, Economy and Urban Management Commission and Committee on Legal Affairs. The same year she was elected as a Deputy Chairman of the Georgian Dream Caucus.

On October 30, 2018, it was reported by the media that, due to pressure from local authorities, the independent media agency Imereti News was shut down. The agency's founder, who was the son of Eleonora Archaia, stated that he was forced to temporarily suspend the operations of Imereti News Agency because of direct and indirect threats made against him and his family by the Kutaisi Deputy Mayor and Deputy Governor of Imereti.

In May 2019, Eleonora Archaia publicly apologised for a controversial statement made by her fellow party member Nana Kostava. Kostava faced criticism after sharing a video of a girl whose underage sister had recently died in a tragic accident, accompanied by an insensitive comment. Archaia expressed condolences to the family of the deceased teenager and condemned the statement, emphasising that such remarks are unacceptable and opposed by any rational person. She took responsibility on behalf of her party and addressed the public to clarify her stance on the matter.

On February 18, 2021, Giorgi Gakharia resigned as Prime Minister, left the ruling Georgian Dream, and founded a new party in May. In August of the same year, Archaia announced via a Facebook post, that she had left the Georgian Dream and joined Gakharia's newly formed party. In September, Gakharia was nominated Kutaisi mayoral candidate and Party-list of City council members. Archaia was named as a lead candidate for City Assembly. After the 2021 local election, the For Georgia party got 6.71% of the votes and became the third biggest party in the Kutaisi City Assembly. Archaia was elected for the second time.

The day after the election Archaia's car was damaged. Window glass was shattered, although her bag and mobile phone were not stolen. She stated that the incident was related to her political activities as she left the ruling party. Nobody has been detained and the case is not closed.

== Tenure ==
During her tenure, she has been involved in advocacy on a range of issues, including environmental, infrastructure, social, and cultural matters.

Eleonora Archaia has been an active advocate for improving Kutaisi’s infrastructure through several initiatives. She has called for the construction of a new, modern railway station, emphasizing that the existing Rioni Railway Station is outdated and fails to meet current standards despite recent renovations. Archaia urged both central and local governments to prioritize the development of a new station to address these infrastructure shortcomings and facilitate more efficient intercity transportation.

In addition to rail infrastructure, Archaia has repeatedly raised the issue of expanding public transportation between Kutaisi and Kutaisi International Airport, a campaign that contributed to the establishment of a permanent public transport connection. Furthermore, she has advocated for a comprehensive overhaul of the city’s public transportation system. In her criticism, Archaia highlighted problems such as long wait times, limited route coverage, inadequate infrastructure, and the absence of night service after 10:00 p.m.

Archaia has also expressed concern regarding the deteriorating condition of the former Parliament building in Kutaisi. She described the neglect of a structure valued at hundreds of millions of Georgian lari as unacceptable and argued that revitalizing the building should be a priority for a future coalition government following the 2024 parliamentary elections.

Moreover, Archaia emphasized the importance of flood prevention measures, particularly in high-risk areas vulnerable to heavy rainfall. She called for the identification of such zones and the allocation of additional funding for infrastructure improvements before the finalization of the municipal budget, stressing that these measures are essential to protect the city and its residents.

=== Committee Assignments in City Council ===
- Committee on Health and Social Affairs
- Committee on Finance and Budget

Former Committee assignments

- Gender Equality Council (2021-2025)
- Committee on Legal Affairs (2017-2021)
- Committee on Economy, Property Management and Urban Economy (2017-2021)

== Electoral history ==
2017 Election for Kutaisi City Council District 7

Candidate	Party	Votes	%
Eleonora Archaia	Georgian Dream	2,419	49.90
Davit Bakhtadze	United National Movement	1,115	23.00
Kakhaberi Koridze	European Georgia	567	11.70
Badri Porchkhidze	Alliance of Patriots	227	4.68
Giorgi Svanidze	Democratic Movement	182	3.75
Davit Sofromadze	Labour Party	154	3.18
Gogi Daushvili	Strategy Builder	137	2.83
Salome Kometiani	Independent	47	0.97
Total		4,848	100.00

== See also ==
- Kutaisi City Assembly
- For Georgia
