= Narazeni =

Narazeni ნარაზენი
- Village
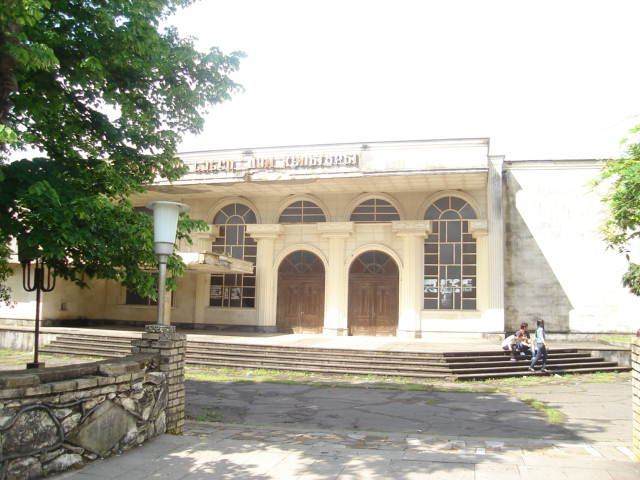
- Narazeni Cultural Hall building

- Location in Georgia Narazeni (Samegrelo-Zemo Svaneti)
- Coordinates: 42°24′45″N 41°56′46″E
- Country: Georgia
- Mkhare: Samegrelo-Zemo Svaneti
- Municipality: Zugdidi

Government
  - Rtsmunebuli: Nana Janjgava
- Elevation: 440 ft (130 m)

Population (2014)
  - Total: 2,345
- Demonym(s): Narazenian, Narazenali
- Time zone: UTC+4 (Georgian Time)

Narazeni (Georgian and Mingrelian: ნარაზენი) is a village in the Zugdidi Municipality of Samegrelo-Zemo Svaneti region of western Georgia. It is situated 17 km east of the city Zugdidi.

== History ==
The village was on the transit route in the Silk Road period.

During the Soviet period, Narazeni was a farming village. There were tea plantations, fruit gardens, and mandarine plantations.

Presently, the head of the village is Nana Janjgava (2015-).

== Geography ==
The village is partly mountainous. The Chanistskali River flows through the village.

== Population ==
As of 2014, the village has a population of 2,345. Narazeni residents speak Megrelian, Georgian, Russian and a little bit English.

== Facilities ==
In the village there are three schools, a kindergarten, ambulance, police, and a few shops. During the Soviet period a newspaper in the Megrelian language called "Narazenish Chai" was published in the village.

== Notable citizens ==
Eleonora Archaia - (b. 1967) is a Georgian politician and Businesswoman, who is a member of Kutaisi City Assembly.

== See also ==
- Samegrelo-Zemo Svaneti
