= Chanistsqali =

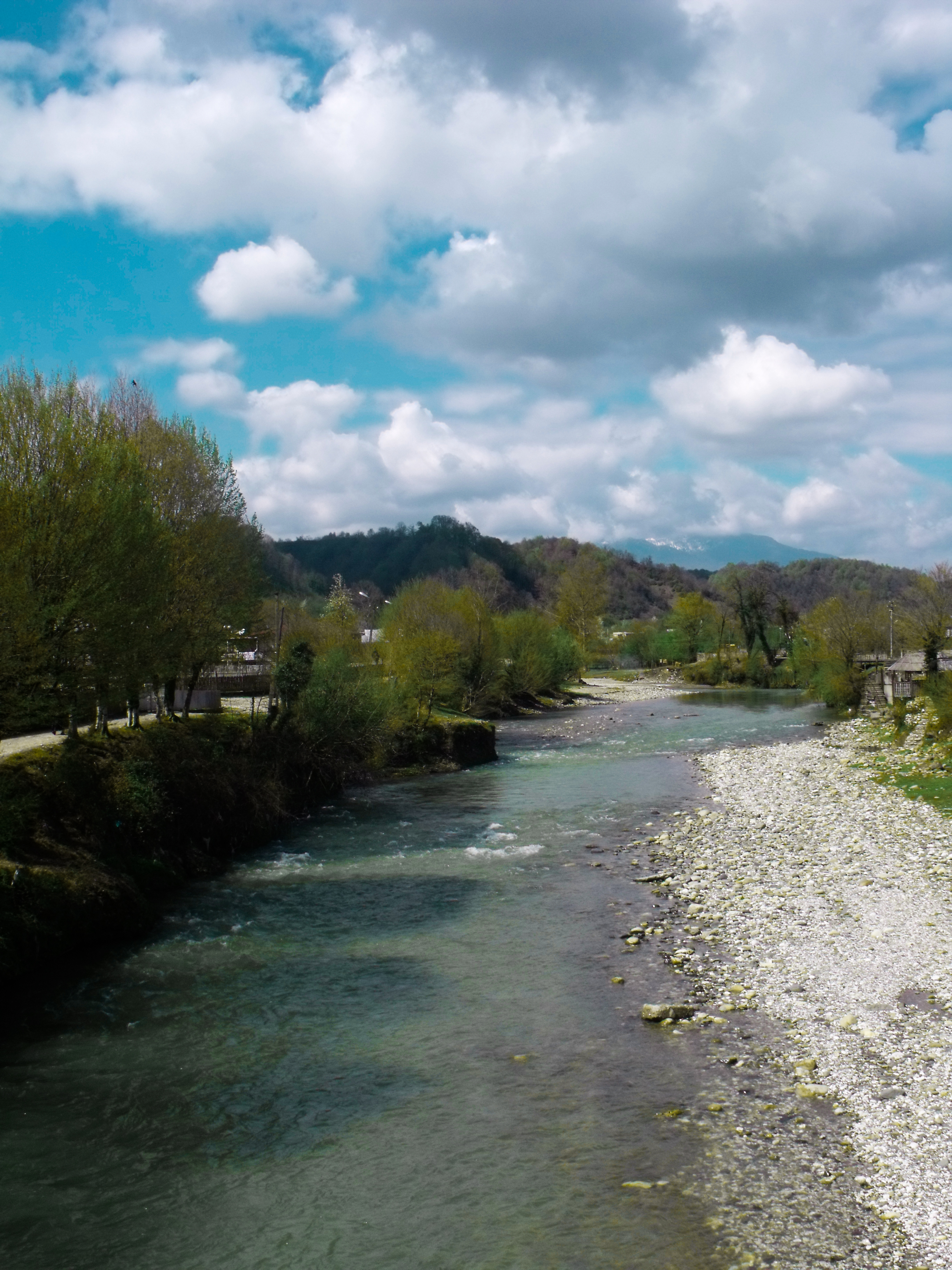
- Chanistsqali

- Location within Samegrelo-Zemo Svaneti Location within Georgia
- Native name: ჭანისწყალი (Georgian)

Location
- Country: Georgia

Physical characteristics
- Mouth: Khobi
  - coordinates: 42°21′55″N 41°54′49″E
- Length: 63 km (39 mi)
- Basin size: 315 km^{2} (122 sq mi)

Basin features
- Progression: Khobi→ Black Sea

The Chanistsqali (Georgian: ჭანისწყალი) also spelled as Chanistskali is a river in the historic Mengrelia province of Samegrelo-Zemo Svaneti in western Georgia. It originates on the southern slopes of the Egris ridge, at an altitude of 1960 meters above sea level. It flows through the town Tsalenjikha, and passes through the municipalities Tsalenjikha, Chkhorotsqu, Zugdidi and Khobi. The Chanistsqali is a right tributary of the river Khobi, discharging into it near the village Narazeni, north of the town of Khobi.
