= Tsalenjikha =

Tsalenjikha წალენჯიხა
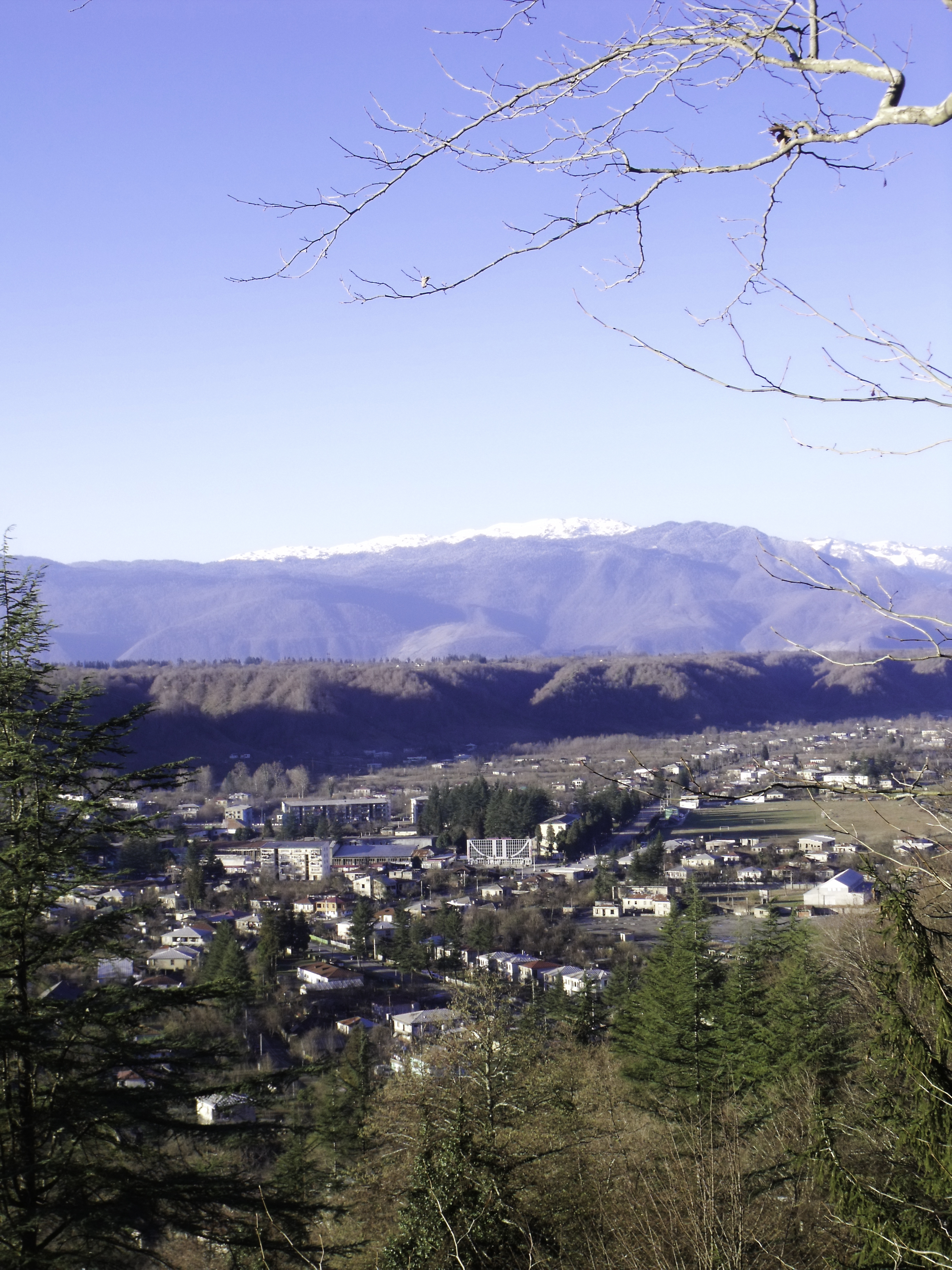

- Flag Seal

- Location of Tsalenjikha in Georgia Tsalenjikha (Samegrelo-Zemo Svaneti)
- Coordinates: 42°36′42″N 42°04′14″E
- Country: Georgia
- Mkhare: Samegrelo-Zemo Svaneti
- District: Tsalenjikha
- Elevation: 222 m (728 ft)

Population (2024)
  - Total: 3,013
- Time zone: UTC+4 (Georgian Time)
- Website: www.tsalenjikha.ge

Tsalenjikha (Georgian: წალენჯიხა, also transliterated as Tsalendjikha and Tzalenjikha) is a town in Samegrelo-Zemo Svaneti region of western Georgia with a population of 3,847 as of 2014. It is located on the river Chanistsqali. Historically, Tsalenjikha functioned as one of the residences of the Dadiani princess of Mingrelia and a bishopric seat with a medieval cathedral of the Savior.

== Etymology ==
"Tsalenjikha" is a composite toponym, meaning in Mingrelian either "the fortress of Chan" (I. Kipchidze, S. Janashia) or "the lower fortress" (A. Chikobava).

== Notable people ==
- Terenti Graneli (1897–1934), poet
- Georgi Tsurtsumia (born 1980), Georgian-Kazakh wrestler, Olympic medalist
- Khvicha Kvaratskhelia (born 2001), footballer
