= Tsalenjikha Cathedral =

Georgian Orthodox cathedral in Tsalenjikha, Georgia

Tsalenjikha Cathedral წალენჯიხის საკათედრო ტაძარი
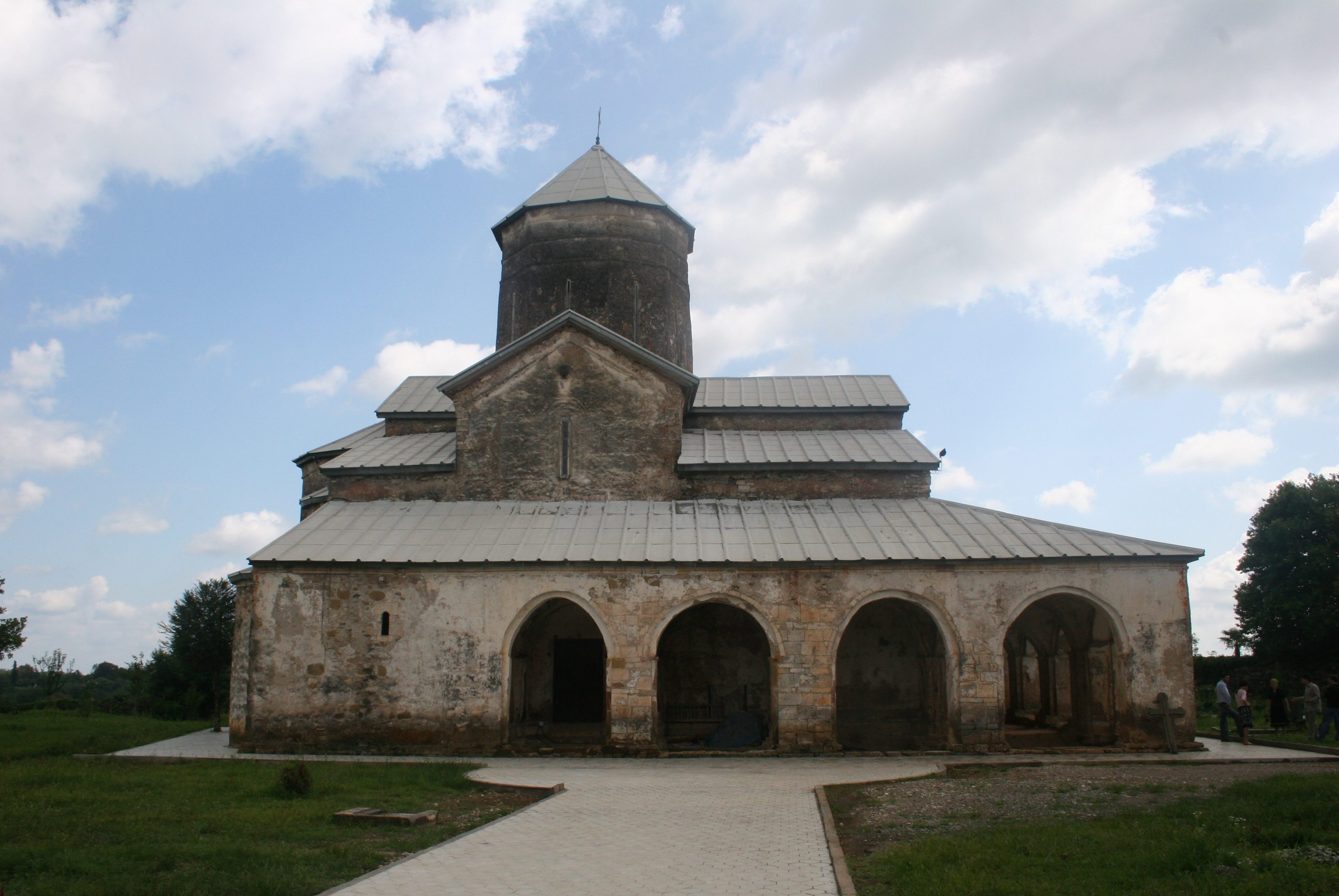
- Tsalenjikha Cathedral (front façade)

- Location within Georgia

Religion
- Affiliation: Georgian Orthodox Church

Location
- Location: Tsalenjikha, Samegrelo-Zemo Svaneti, Georgia
- Coordinates: 42.600501°N 42.081718°E

Architecture
- Type: Church
- Style: Georgian
- Completed: 12-14th century

The Tsalenjikha Cathedral Church of the Transfiguration of Savior (Georgian: წალენჯიხის მაცხოვრის ფერისცვალების საკათედრო ტაძარი, romanized: ts'alenjikhis matskhovris peristsvalebis sak'atedro t'adzari) is a medieval Georgian Orthodox cathedral at the town of Tsalenjikha, Samegrelo-Zemo Svaneti region, Georgia.

The cathedral is administered by the Zugdidi and Tsaishi Eparchy of the Georgian Orthodox Church. It is best known for a unique cycle of murals which exemplifies the direct import of Byzantine Palaeologan style and even artists in Georgia.

== History and architecture ==
Built in the 12th-14th centuries, the Tsalenjikha Cathedral is a central cross-domed church with a narthex and three arcaded galleries two of which, that to the south and north, had been converted into the familial chapel of the House of Dadiani. The church is encircled by the circuit wall with a two-storey bell-tower in its north-western corner. Outside the wall, the Dadiani palace lay in ruins. An interesting structure is a tunnel, 40–45 metres (130-150 ft) long and 3–4 metres (10–13 ft) high, running in a westerly direction from the church. In the 19th century, a new floor was laid down. Between the 1960s and 1980s, the church was partially repaired and incomplete emergency conservation measures of the frescoes were implemented.

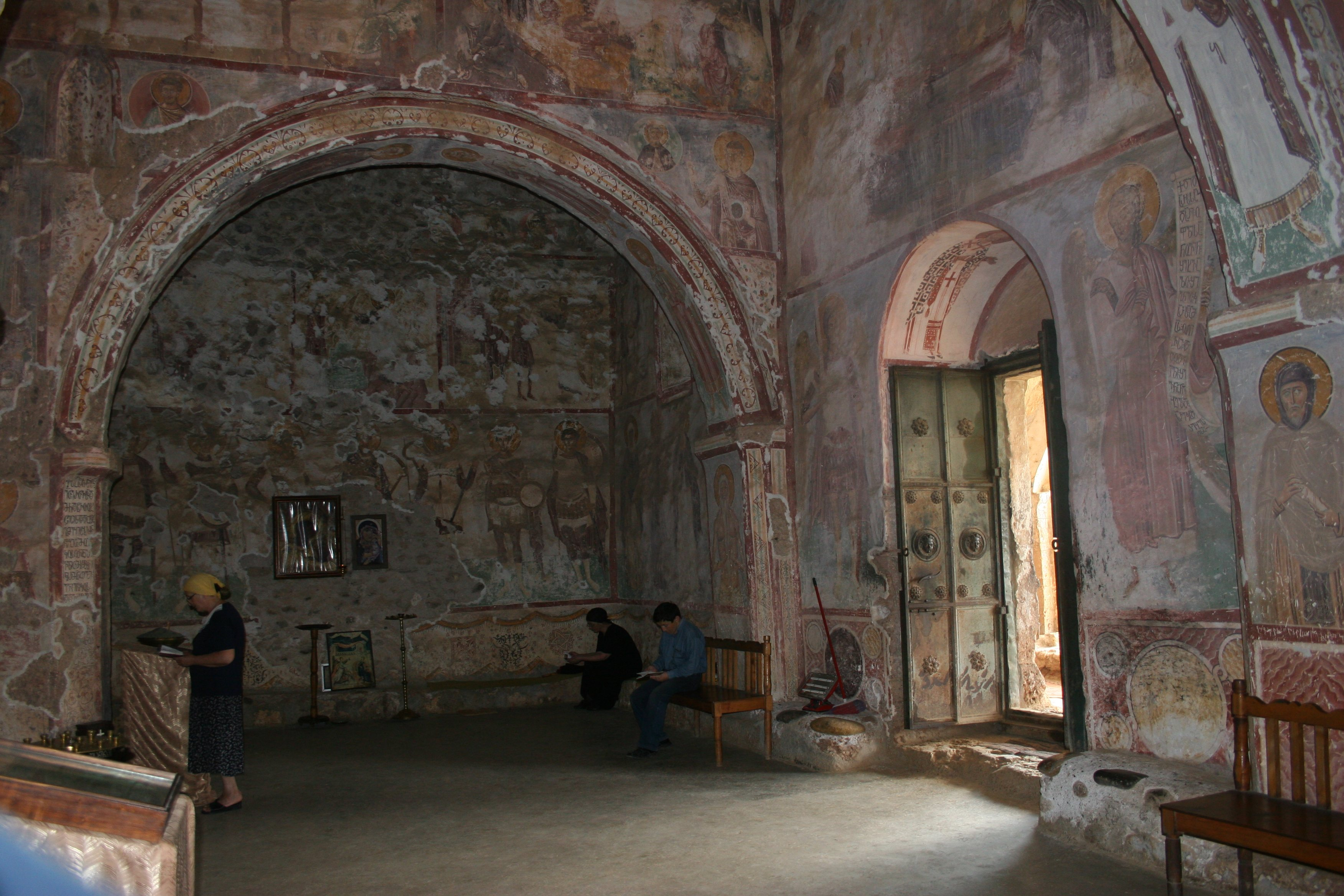
Tsalenjikha Cathedral (interior)

A bilingual Greco-Georgian inscription on the south-western pillar reveals that the interior of the church was frescoed by Cyrus Emanuel Eugenicus, a Byzantine artist from Constantinople, recruited by Vameq I Dadiani (r. 1384–1396), a high-ranking official at the royal court of Georgia. A Georgian inscription on the north-western pillar mentions two other persons – Makharobeli Kvabalia and Andronike Gabisulava – sent by Vameq to bring the Greek master to Georgia. In the 17th century, old frescoes were repaired at the behest of Bishop Eudemon Jaiani, while Levan II Dadiani, Prince of Mingrelia (r. 1611–1657), commissioned the adjoining chapel and had its interior covered with murals. Only fragments of these additions have survived, including Levan's family portrait on the southern wall of the chapel.

Eugenicus’s murals are regarded as one of the best examples of the late Paleologian art. The iconographical program is complicated and contains many details not usual for the medieval Georgian wall painting. The murals are presently endangered and need emergency conservation.
