= Khobi (river) =

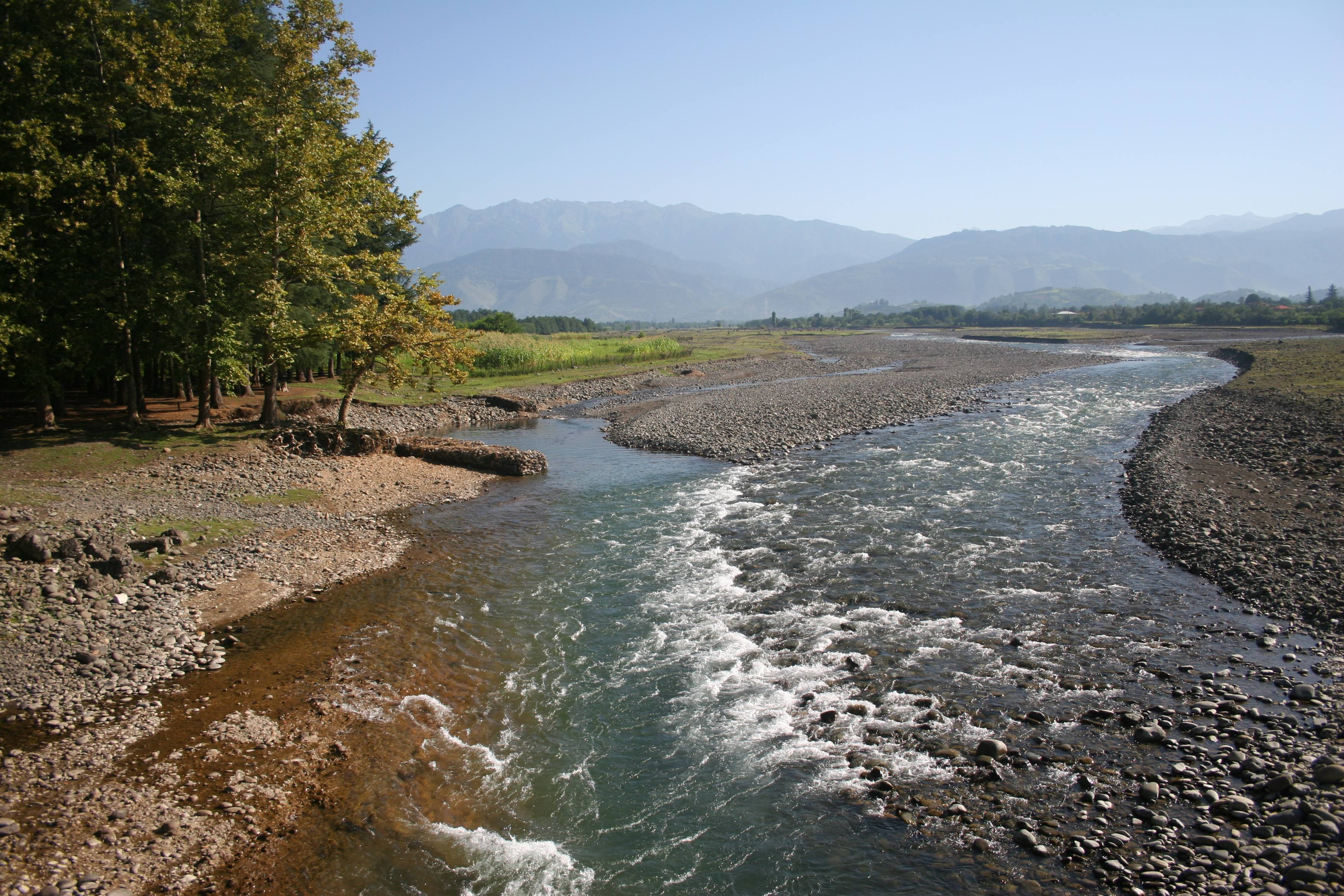

- Location within Samegrelo-Zemo Svaneti Location within Georgia
- Native name: ხობი (Georgian)

Location
- Country: Georgia

Physical characteristics
- Source
  - location: Egrissky Range
- Mouth: Black Sea
  - coordinates: 42°16′33″N 41°38′03″E
- Length: 150 km (93 mi)
- Basin size: 1,340 km^{2} (520 sq mi)

Basin features
- Tributaries
  - right: Chanistsqali

The Khobi (Georgian: ხობი) or Khobistskali (ხობისწყალი) is a river in Georgia. It flows into the Black Sea through the Colchis Lowland. Khobi town and Chkhorotsqu town are both situated on the banks of the Khobi river. It is used for irrigation in some areas. It is 150 km (93 mi) long, and has a drainage basin of 1,340 km^{2} (520 sq mi).

The river is mainly fed by rainwater. The mean flow rate (30 km from the mouth) is 44.2 m^{3}/s, maximum 333m^{3}/s. The main tributary of the Khobi is the Chanistskali.

During the Great Patriotic War, as the Eastern Front of World War II was known in the Soviet Union, there was a temporary base of the Black Sea Fleet.

In 2000-2005 an oil depot for tankers was built in the village of Kulevi, near the mouth of the Khobi.

== See also ==
- Geography of Georgia (country)
