= Terenti Graneli =

Georgian poet (1897–1934)

Terenti Graneli ტერენტი გრანელი
- Born: 3 June 1897; Tsalenjikha, Kutaisi Governorate, Russian Empire
- Died: 10 October 1934 (aged 37); Tbilisi, Georgian SSR, Soviet Union
- Occupation: poet

Terenti Samsonovich Kvirkvelia (Georgian: ტერენტი სამსონის ძე კვირკველია), well known with his pen-name Terenti Graneli (Georgian: ტერენტი გრანელი) (1897–1934) was a noted Georgian poet. Born in Tsalenjikha, he was raised in a family of poor peasants. After graduating primary school in his native village in 1918 he continued studying at the short courses organized by Shalva Nutsubidze in Tbilisi. He had several jobs including a worker at the railway station, and clerk at the newspaper. Graneli published his first verses in 1918. His collection of poems "Memento mori" appeared in 1924. From the beginning of 1928 Graneli's health worsened and he died in 1934.

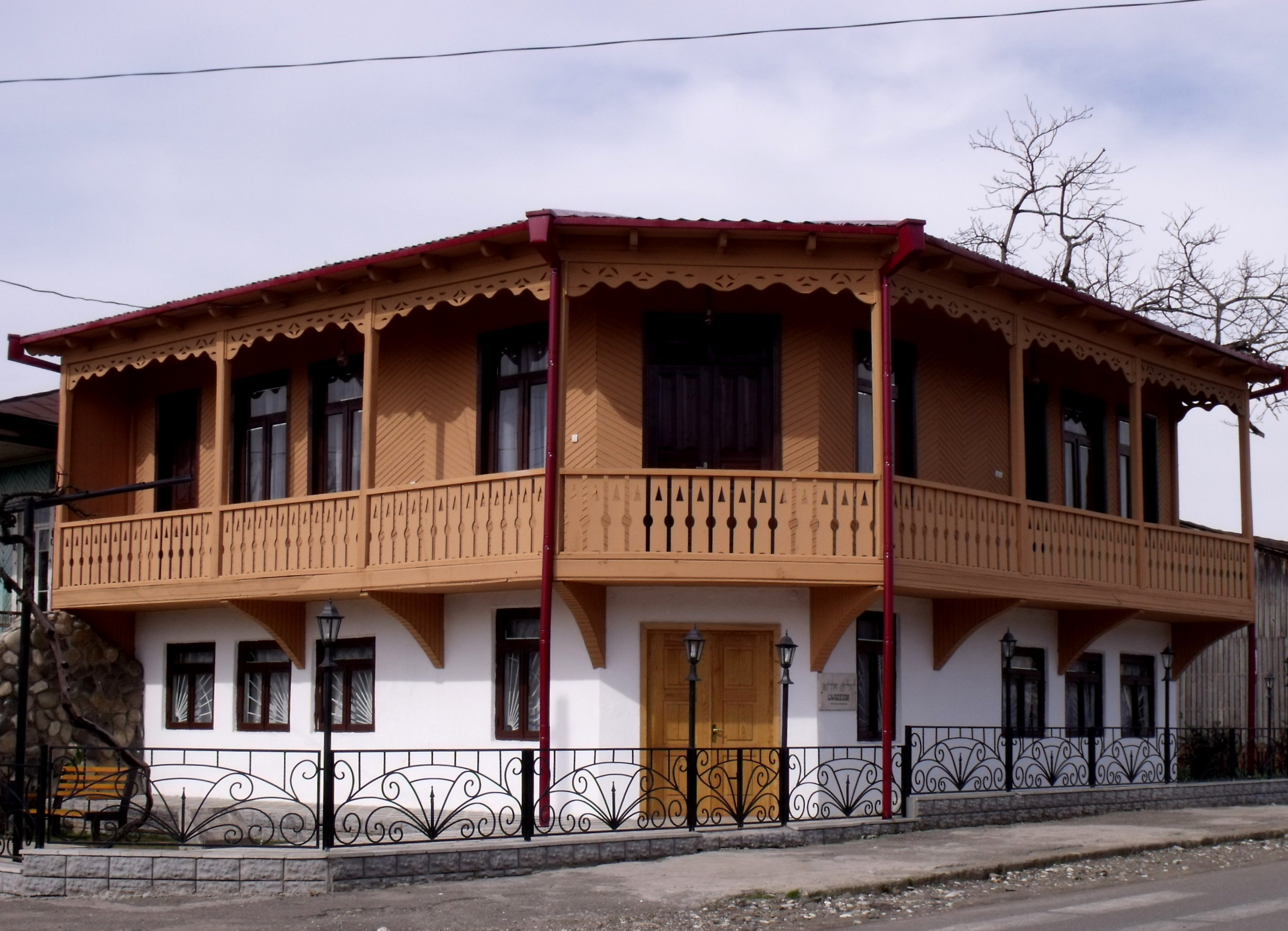
The house museum of Terenti Graneli in Tsalenjikha

His works include poems, essays. His letters to his sisters are also well-known.

== See also ==
- Titsian Tabidze
- Galaktion Tabidze
