= Vake =

Vake may refer to:

- Vake District in Tbilisi, Georgia
- Vake, Tbilisi, a neighbourhood in Tbilisi
- Vake Park, a park in Tbilisi
- Vake (Gagra District), a village in Abkhazia, Georgia
- VAKE, the ICAO code for Kandla Airport in Gujarat, India
