= Former Student-Halls on Chavchavadze Ave. =

Student halls turned into refugee accommodations

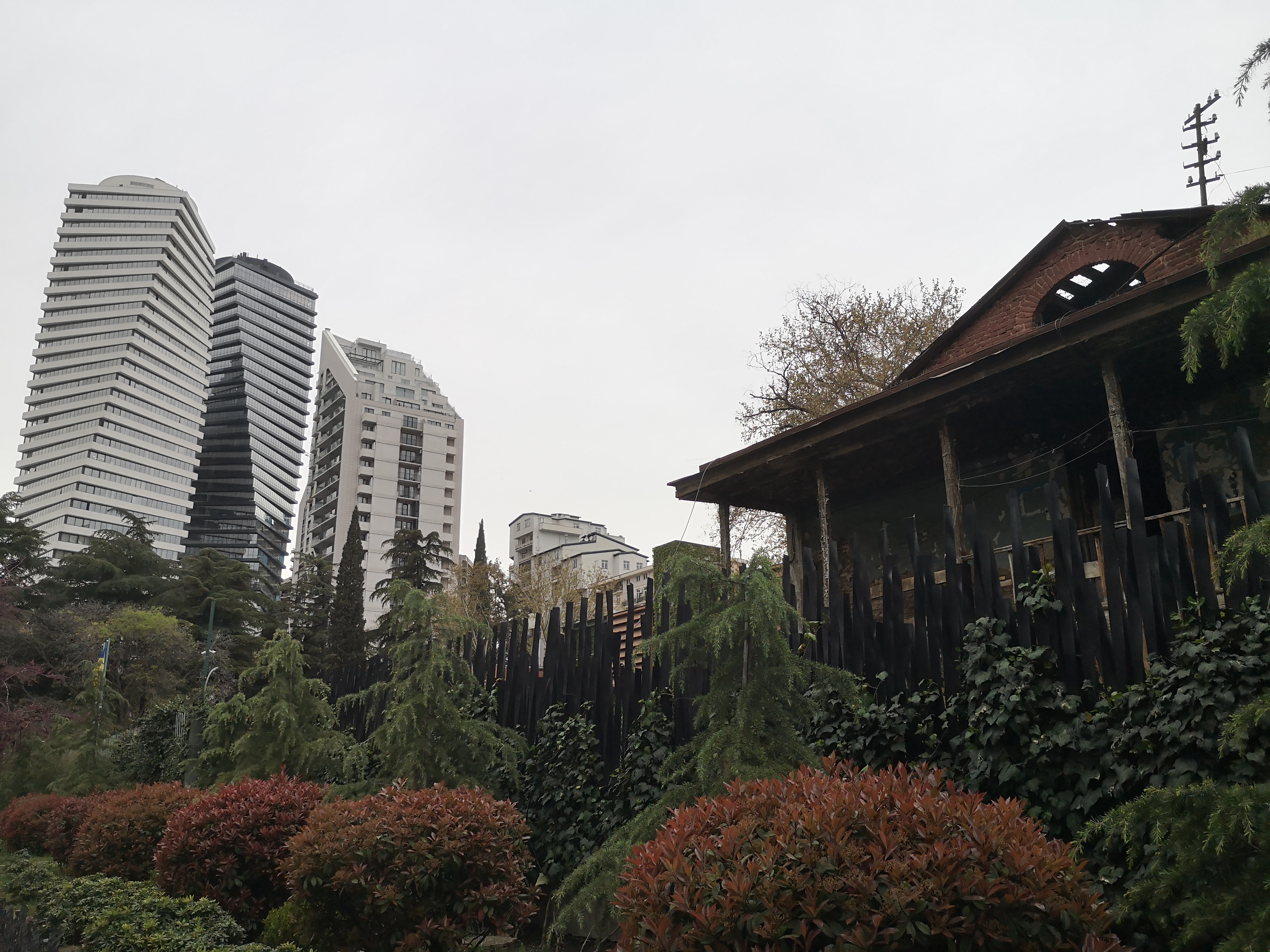
The former student halls in Vake

The former student halls on Chavchavadze Ave are buildings in the Vake District of Tbilisi, Georgia. The four two-storey buildings, which used to be residence halls for Tbilisi State University, are mostly populated by the IDPs from Abkhazia region, who escaped the Russian Occupation of the region in the early 1990s.

== History ==
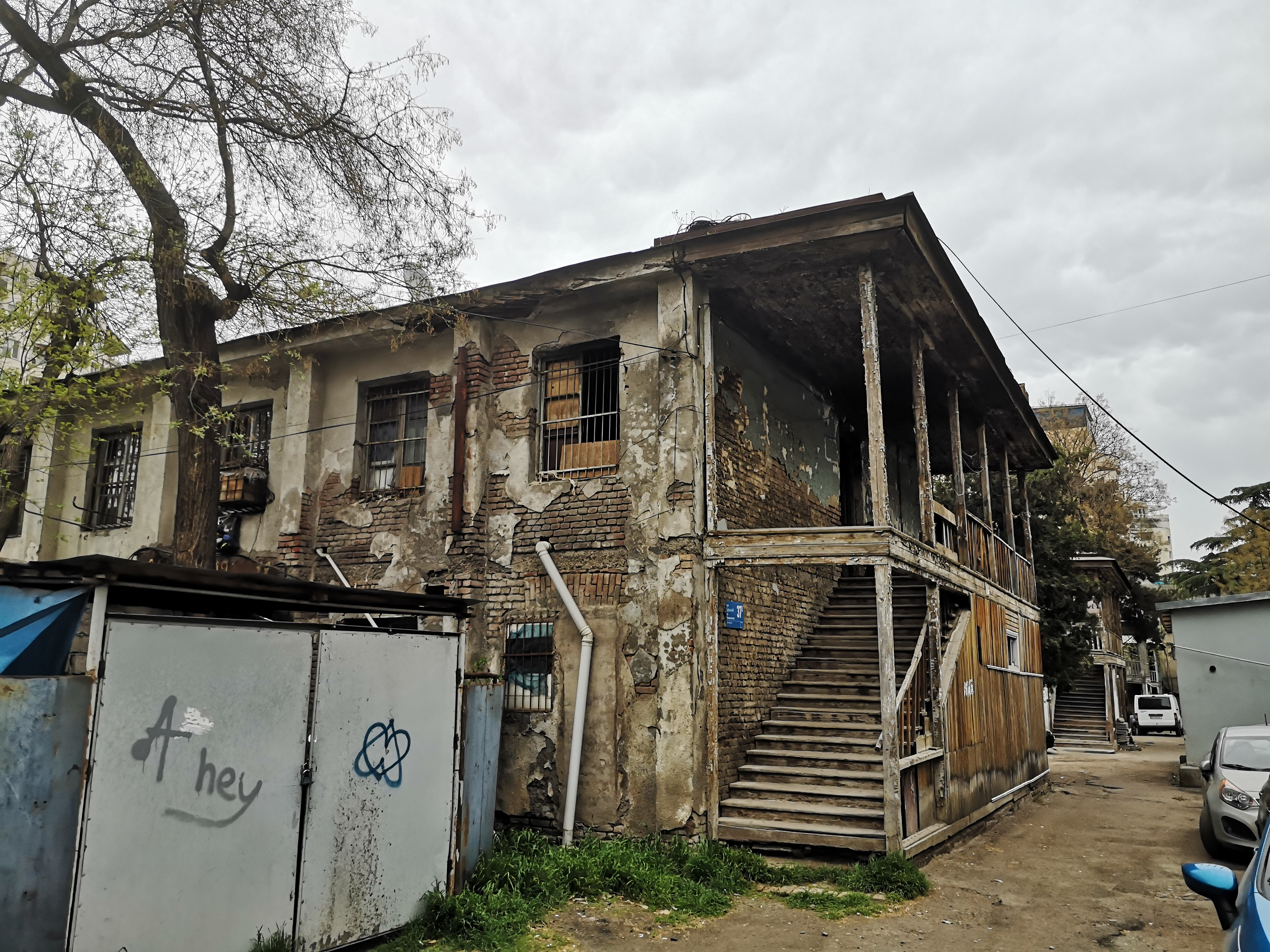
The former student halls in Vake

Tbilisi State University was established in 1918 and the student residence halls were built in the 1930s around 1.5 km away from the main campus. The area where these halls were first built was considered as grasslands of the suburbs of Tbilisi with the potential to become a student district.

Over the past century, the grasslands developed into what became known as Vake District - and as one of the most densely populated, expensive, and prestigious residential areas in Tbilisi. Vake developed independently from the university and today, only four out of five student residence hall buildings remain there.

Even these buildings lost their initial purpose though. The war in Abkhazia in the 1990s forced a significant part of the population to move and settle across the country as Internally Displaced Persons (IDPs). Soon, the once student halls were populated by these IDPs, and the buildings’ function as student hall ended. The uncertain future of the buildings since then left them in a worse condition than they were 30 years ago - more worn down, with worsening living conditions, and with little prospect of development. The situation was further exacerbated by the fires that broke out in 2018, burning around 70 square meters of residential area.

The council granted the residents the ownership of the properties but plans for redeveloping the area by erecting of high rising towers were disapproved in 2021. The living conditions remain poor and affect all the residents there; in the meantime, the buildings remain as one of the most underdeveloped in the district. Today the IDP populated student halls remain as a sad reminder of the past wars, reflect the current challenges and symbolize the struggles of IDPs across Georgia.
