= Borjomi–Bakuriani railway =

Narrow-gauge railway in Georgia

Borjomi–Bakuriani Railway LCC
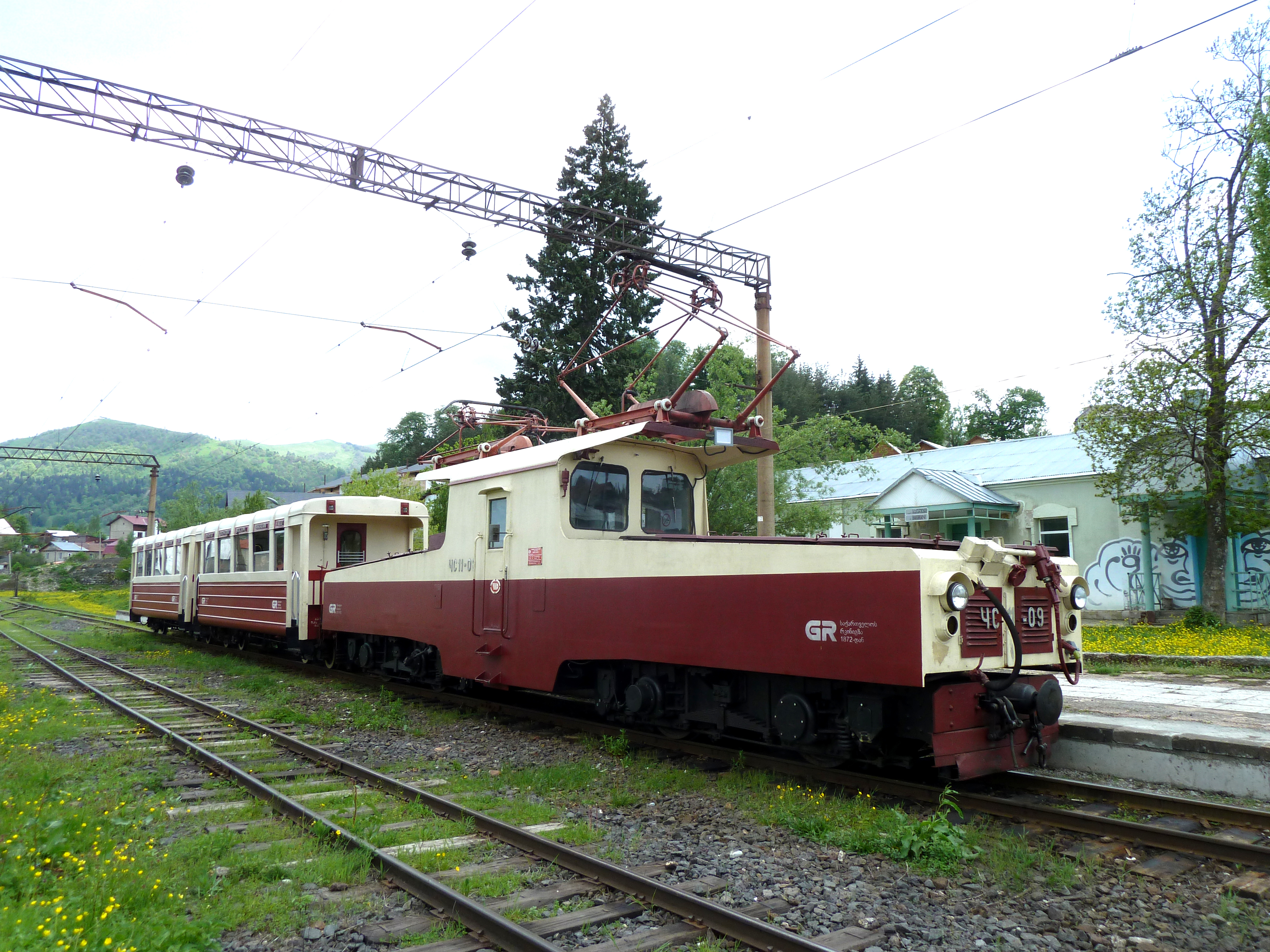

Overview
- Native name: ბაკურიანი-ბორჯომის რკინიგზა (bak'uriani-borj'omis rk'inigza)
- Termini: Borjomi; Bakuriani
- Stations: Tsaghveri, Tsemi, Libani, Sakochavi

Technical
- Line length: 37.2 km (23.1 mi)
- Track gauge: 900 mm (2 ft 11 7/16 in)
- Electrification: 1500 V DC

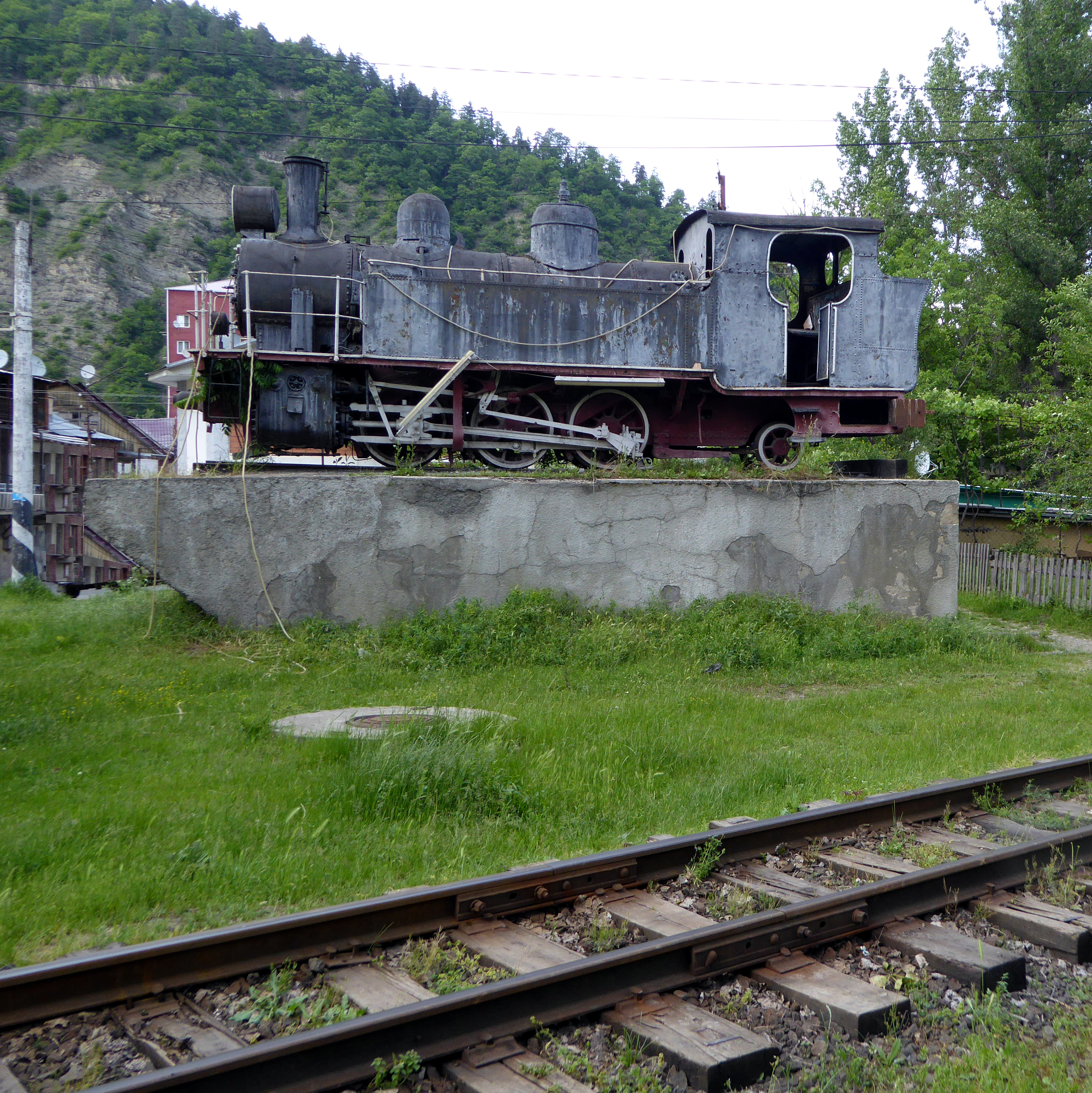
Original steam engine (1902-1966) on a plinth in Borjomi

The Kukushka (Russian for "little cuckoo") is a 37.2 kilometres (23.1 miles) long narrow-gauge railway line linking the town of Borjomi (820 m asl) to the daba and ski resort of Bakuriani (1,700 m asl) in Georgia.

The construction of this 900 mm (2 ft 11 7/16 in) line began in 1897, when Georgia was still part of the Russian Empire. The difficult terrain caused construction to take four years, and the first train ran in January 1902. Gustave Eiffel was commissioned by the Romanovs to design the Eiffel Bridge, Tsagveri over the Tsemistskhali River between the stations of Tsaghveri and Tsemi.

Originally, trains were pulled by a steam engine built by H.K. Porter, imported from the United States, and passengers travelled in open carriages protected by handrails. The line was electrified in 1966, when the small steam engine was replaced by an electric "crocodile" locomotive made by the Škoda works in Czechoslovakia.

The line is currently operated by Borjomi–Bakuriani Railway LLC (BBR), a subsidiary of Georgian Railways.

Although the line was until 1991 also used to transport andesite from a mine near Bakuriani, the Kukushka is now exclusively a passenger service used by tourists and local residents. Travel time is 2.5 hours (average speed 15 km/h), and there are two trains a day in each direction. Connection to Tbilisi is ensured, but not vice versa.

The train service has stopped as of 2022. It is not known if it will be continued, but the Bakuriani Development Agency is actively working to ensure that it does.
