= Kvabiskhevi church =

- ქვაბისხევის ეკლესია
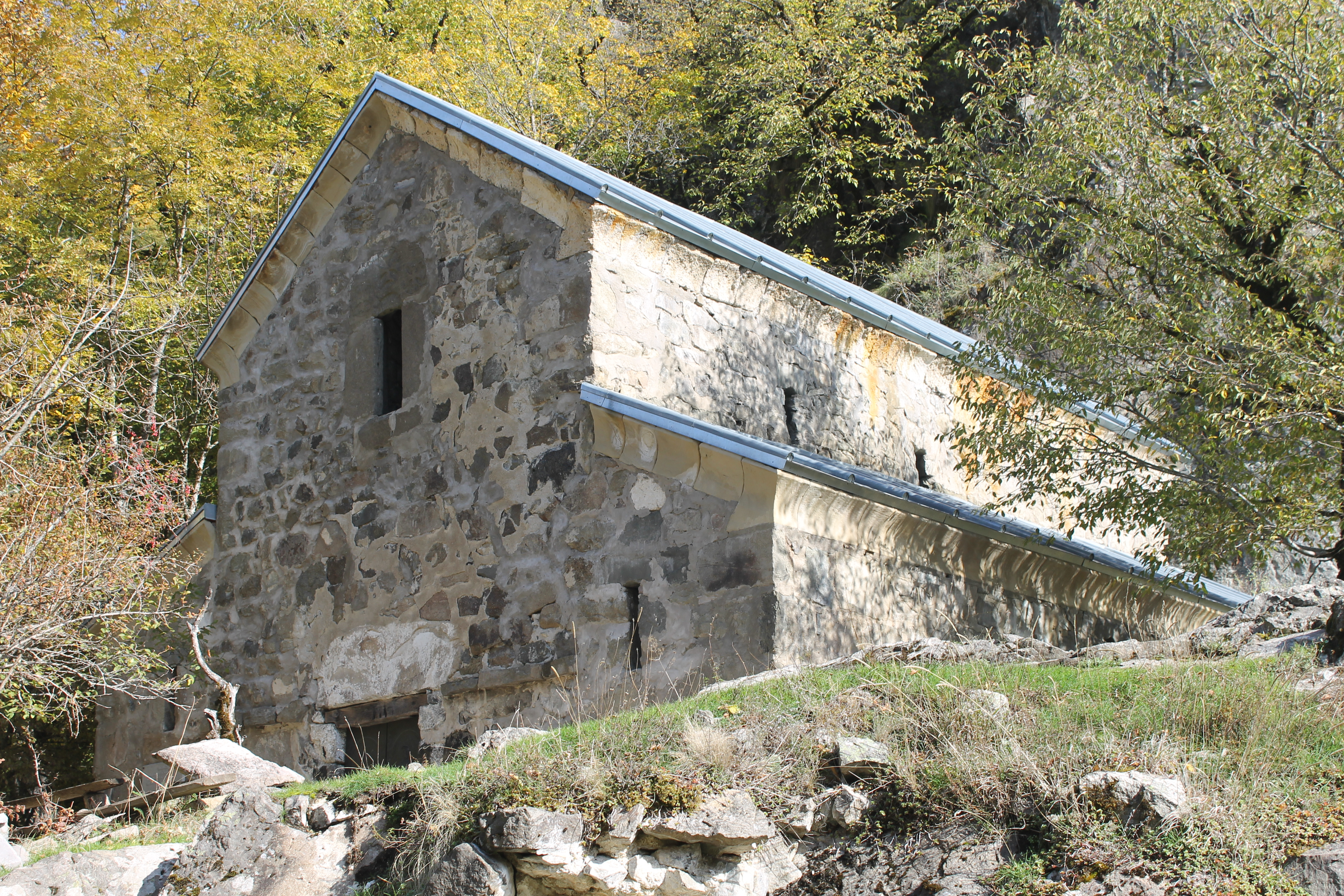
- Kvabiskhevi church
- Interactive map of Kvabiskhevi church
- Location: Kvabiskhevi, Borjomi Municipality, Samtskhe-Javakheti, Georgia
- Coordinates: 41.786839°N 43.239133°E
- Type: Three-nave basilica

The Kvabiskhevi church of the Dormition (Georgian: ქვაბისხევის ღვთისმშობლის მიძინების სახელობის ეკლესია, romanized: kvabiskhevis ghvtismshoblis midzinebis sakhelobis ek'lesia), also known as Mariamtsminda (მარიამწმინდა, mariamts'minda, "St. Mary") is a medieval Georgian Orthodox church, situated 2 km northwest of the village of Kvabiskhevi, Borjomi Municipality, in Georgia's south-central region of Samtskhe-Javakheti. A three-nave basilica, the church was constructed in the 8th or 9th century on a high rocky mountain slope, overlooking the steep descent into the deep river canyon. The church is known for its 12th–13th-century fresco portrait of the young nobleman named Shota, who is popularly believed to be the contemporaneous epic poet Shota Rustaveli. The Kvabiskhevi church is inscribed on the list of the Immovable Cultural Monuments of National Significance of Georgia.

== History ==
Kvabiskhevi is a three-nave basilica built of stone on a small terrace of a high rocky mountain slope, its eastern façade leaning against the rock—the face of which had been purposefully chipped off—and the three other sides overlooking the steep abyss into the Kvabiskhevi canyon. The terrace can only be accessed via a trail from the northeast leading up to the church from the Kvabiskhevi guard station of the Borjomi-Kharagauli National Park.

Difficult to access, the church served in the Middle Ages as a wartime shelter for the locals, whose ruined dwellings and rock-cut shelters are found below the church. The village, at that time known as Kvabi ("a cave"), was completely depopulated shortly after the Ottoman takeover of the area in 1578—a Turkish census of 1595 listing only six permanent residents—and the church was abandoned. The modern-day village of Kvabiskhevi, southeast of the church, is the result of resettlement from the mountainous northwestern Georgian province of Racha in the 1870s.

== Architecture ==
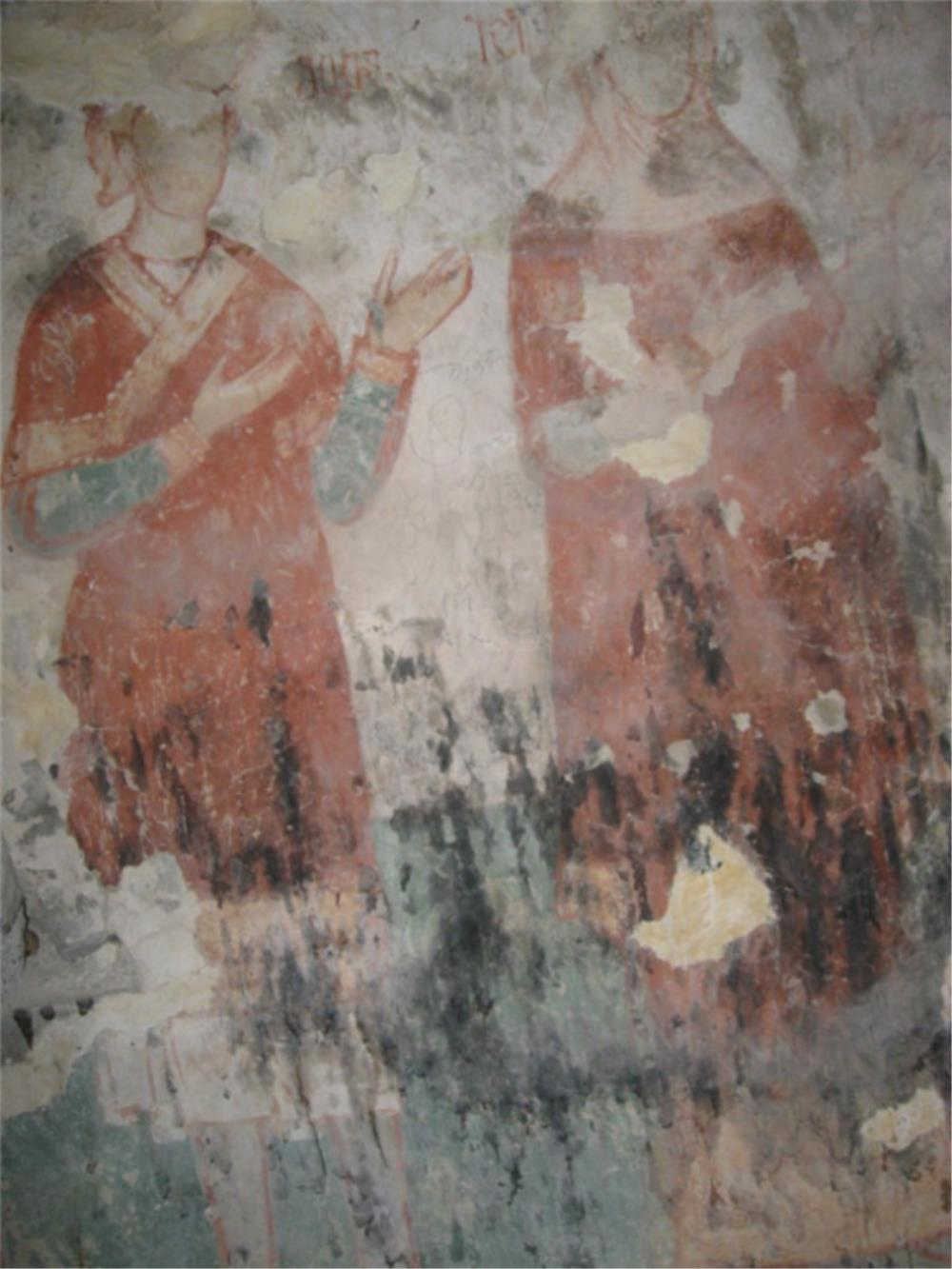
Fresco of Shota and Ia

The church measures 8 x 4 sq. m. The main nave is much larger than the lateral naves, ending in a semi-circular eastern apse with an arched window. The conch is spherical. The upper central portions of the northern and southern walls contain brackets. The lower central portion of the western wall has a doorway, internally architraved and externally arched. The main nave is separated from the other two by two arches on each side, supported by rectangular capitaled pillars. The northern nave terminates with a semi-circular nave with windows. The southern nave is divided into two chambers by a septum pierced by a low rectangular entrance. Most of the external decorations are found on the western façade, including three Bolnisi-type crosses carved in relief above the entrance door, a recurrent motif in early Christian art in Georgia.

The basilica contains remnants of medieval wall painting. Of note is a 12th–13th-century fresco in the northern wall of the southern nave, depicting a young man and a woman, identified by the accompanying medieval Georgian asomtavruli text as Shota and Ia, respectively. The fresco is reproduced in a repoussé work on the iron gate, handmade in 1987. Shota was not an uncommon name among the local aristocracy. One popular hypothesis identifies the man from the Kvabiskhevi fresco with the poet Shota Rustaveli, who penned the epic Knight in the Panther's Skin.
