= Zakaria Paliashvili street =

Street in Tbilisi, Georgia

Zakaria Paliashvili Street
- Native name: ზაქარია ფალიაშვილის ქუჩა (Georgian)
- Former names: Vake street, Vake avenue
- Part of: Vake, Vake District, Tbilisi
- Namesake: Zacharia Paliashvili
- Postal code: 0179

Zakaria Paliashvili Street (Georgian: ზაქარია ფალიაშვილის ქუჩა) is a street of Tbilisi and is named after the Georgian composer Zacharia Paliashvili. The street is located on the right bank of the Kura River in the Vake district of Tbilisi, from Korneli Kekelidze Street to Archil Mishveladze Street. Paliashvili street originated in the 1920s. Formerly it was called Vake Street, according to the 1926 reference of Tbilisi - Vake Avenue. In the 1925-1926 reference book "All of Tiflis", the street is included in the list of new streets in Vake. It was named after Zacharia Paliashvili in the 1930s. Alexander Tvalchrelidze Caucasus Mineral Resources Institute is on the street. There is a monument of Konstantine Gamsakhurdia in the square of the same name (sculptor - Tengiz Kikalishvili, architect - Tamaz Tevzadze).

== Bibliography ==
- ISBN 978-99928-20-35-3 "Tbilisi. Streets, avenues, squares" (ენციკლოპედია «თბილისი. ქუჩები, გამზირები, მოედნები»), pg. 175, Tbilisi, 2008.
