= Imerkhevi (Gagra District) =

Imerkhevi იმერხევი (Georgian)
- Village
- Location in Georgia Imerkhevi (Abkhazia)
- Coordinates: 43°23′49″N 40°08′11″E
- Country: Georgia
- Partially recognized independent country: Abkhazia
- District: Gagra
- Community: Khashupse
- Elevation: 350 m (1,150 ft)

Population (1989)
  - Total: 24
- Time zone: UTC+4 (GET)

Imerkhevi (Georgian: იმერხევი) is a village at an altitude of 350 meters from sea level in the Gagra District of Abkhazia, (Note: The political status of Abkhazia is disputed. Having unilaterally declared independence from Georgia in 1992, Abkhazia is formally recognised as an independent state by 4 UN member states (three other states previously recognised it but then withdrew their recognition), while the remainder of the international community recognizes it as de jure Georgian territory. Georgia continues to claim the area as its own territory, designating it as Russian-occupied territory.) Georgia.

== Literature ==
- Georgian Soviet Encyclopedia, V. 5, p. 116, Tb., 1980.
