= Eiffel Bridge, Tsagveri =

Eiffel Bridge
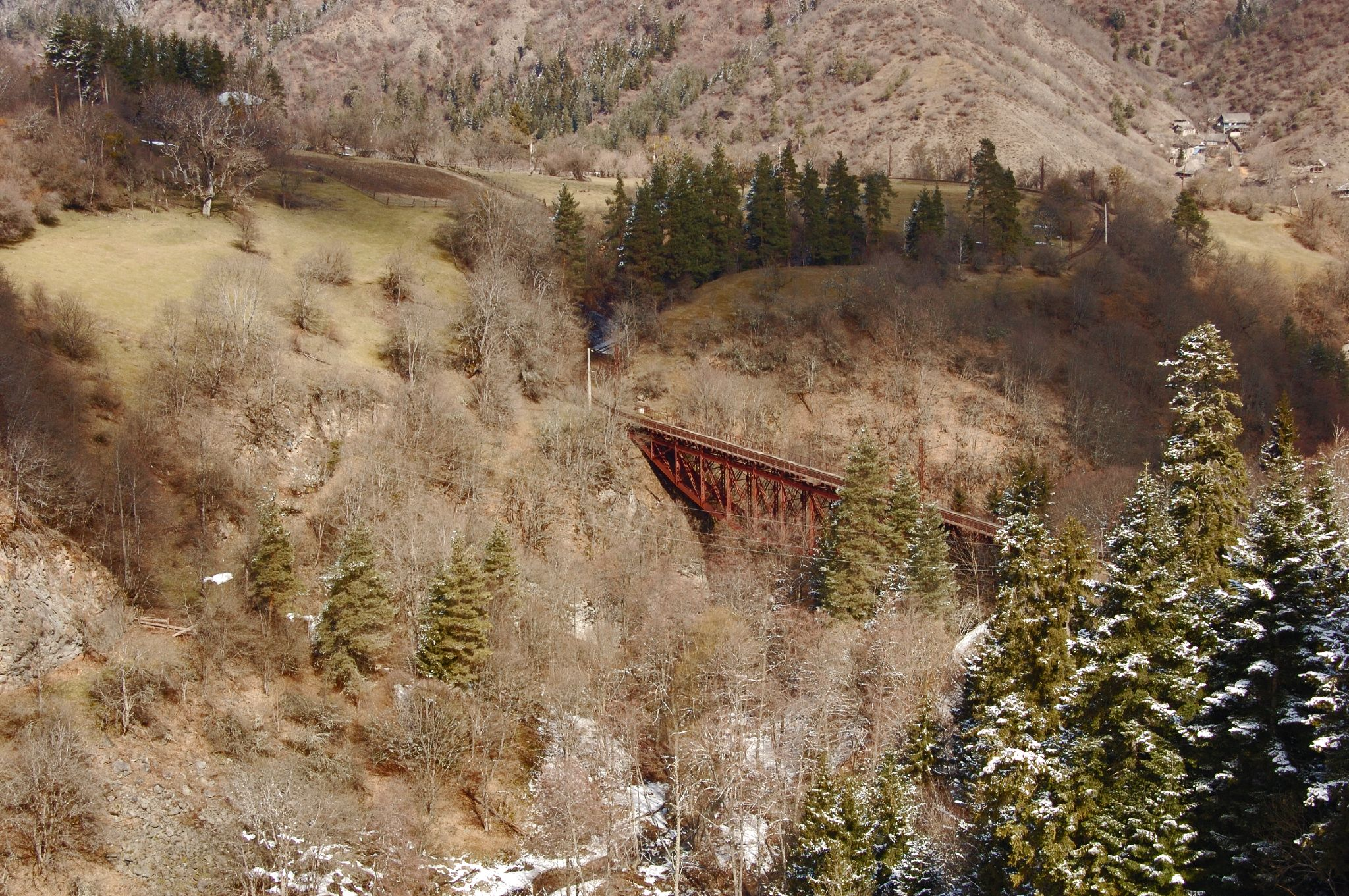
- Coordinates: 41°48′04″N 43°28′13″E
- Carries: Borjomi–Bakuriani railway
- Crosses: Tskhenistskali River
- Locale: Near Tsagveri, Borjomi Municipality, Georgia
- Heritage status: Listed in the Georgian Cultural Heritage Database

Characteristics
- Design: Truss bridge
- Material: Iron/Steel

History
- Architect: Gustave Eiffel
- Constructed by: Besarion Keburia
- Construction start: 1897
- Construction end: 1902
- Opened: 1902

Location
- Interactive map of Eiffel Bridge

The Eiffel Bridge is a bridge over the Tsemistskal river, on the Borjomi–Bakuriani railway near the town of Tsagveri.

== History ==
Grand Duke Michael Nikolaevich of Russia ordered the bridge from the French engineer-constructor and bridge builder Gustave Eiffel.

The construction of the bridge started in 1897 over the Tsemistskal River. The construction of the bridge was carried out by the constructor Besarion Keburia. From January 1902, the first "Kukushka" train passed through the Borjomi-Bakuriani narrow-gauge railway line and over the bridge.
