= Irakli Abashidze Street (Tbilisi) =

Street in Tbilisi, Georgia

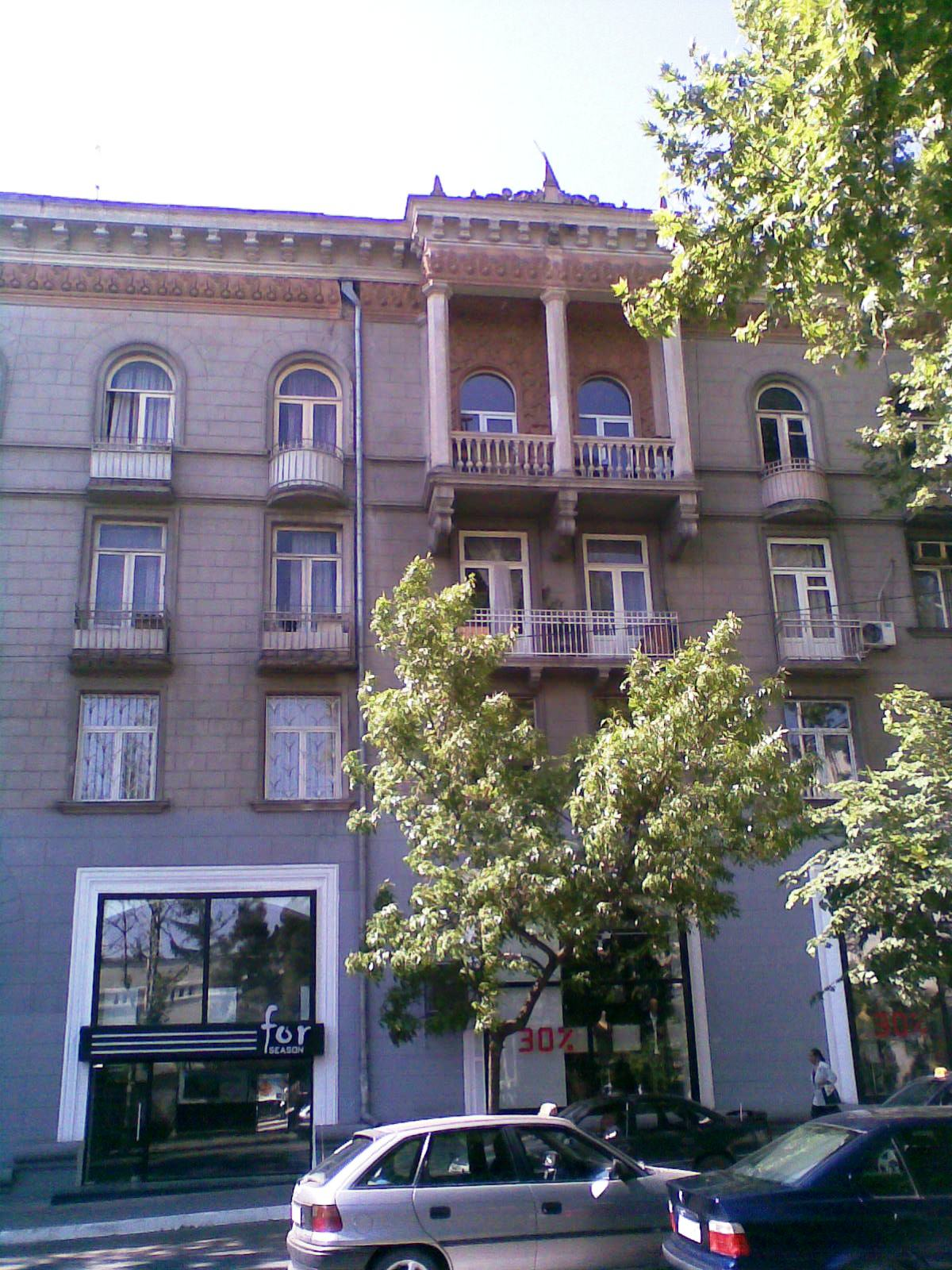
- Interactive map of Irakli Abashidze Street
- Native name: ირაკლი აბაშიძის ქუჩა (Georgian)
- Part of: Vake, Vake District, Tbilisi
- Namesake: Irakli Abashidze
- Postal code: 0179 (#1-53, 2-50); 0162 (#55-87, 52-86)

Irakli Abashidze Street (Georgian: ირაკლი აბაშიძის ქუჩა) is a street of Tbilisi and is named after the Georgian writer Irakli Abashidze. The street is located on the right bank of the Kura River in the Vake district of Tbilisi, from the round garden to Archil Mishveladze Street. The section of Vasil Barnov Street was named after Irakli Abashidze in 1992 (he lived on this street). At the beginning of the street there is a bust of Irakli Abashidze (sculptor K. Arunashvili, architect Giorgi (Giga) Batiashvili).

== Bibliography ==
- ISBN 978-99928-20-35-3 "Tbilisi. Streets, avenues, squares" (ენციკლოპედია «თბილისი. ქუჩები, გამზირები, მოედნები»), pg. 11, Tbilisi, 2008.
