= Buckswood International School – Tbilisi =

Coordinates: 41.679843°N 44.689862°E

Buckswood International School - Tbilisi

Location
- 156 Rustaveli Street, Tskneti; Tbilisi, 0189; Georgia

Information
- Type: Independent
- Motto: Ad Vitam Paramus (To Life Prepared)
- Established: In 2000 as UNAG International School and since 2009 Buckswood International School - Tbilisi
- Headmaster: Sandro Vashakidze
- Staff: 100+
- Gender: Coeducational
- Age: 5 to 18
- Enrolment: 650
- Website: www.buckswood.ge

Buckswood International School (BIST) is an independent school in Tskneti, Tbilisi, Georgia. The school is accredited by the Ministry of Education and Science of Georgia and is a partner school of Buckswood School, Hastings, UK. It was founded in 2009 on the basis of the UNAG International School that has been operating in Georgia since 2000.

As of 2011 the school enrolls 350 students in a day school. Buckswood Tbilisi provides secondary education to students from grades to 1 to 12 (ages:5–18) and also provides an Early Years Foundation Stage (pre-school) Course for children 4 or 5 years old. Instruction is offered in Georgian and English. Academically Buckswood offers GCSE and A Level programs plus full EFL tuition

Sports facilities on campus include a cricket pitch, a specialist football academy, a dance academy, a basketball court, volleyball court, rugby court, table tennis court, tennis court and a performing arts centre. Facilities outside campus include a swimming pool and riding stables.

At Buckswood School students are proportionally assigned by a house system to School Houses - Austin, Bronte, Doyle, Kipling, Milne, Rowling, Schoolhouse and Wells. School Houses compete with each other in academic, cultural and sport activities to earn house points and win prizes. The school house system. Twice a year, up to 30 students are permitted to attend a two-week academic courses at Buckswood School in the UK.
