= Ilia Chavchavadze Avenue =

Avenue in Tbilisi, Georgia

Coordinates: 41.7102°N 44.7643°E

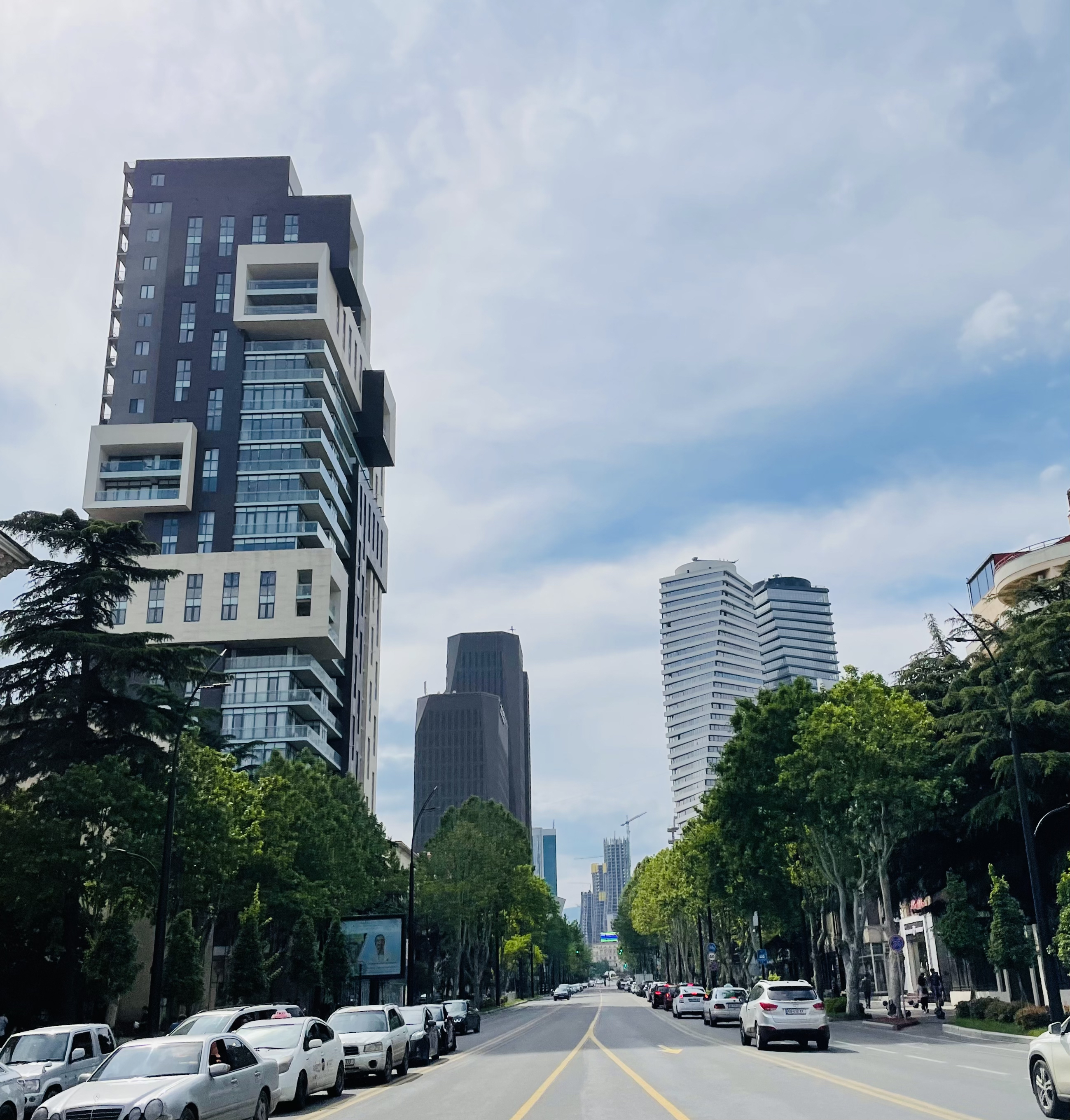
- High-rise residential and office buildings on Ilia Chavchavadze Avenue

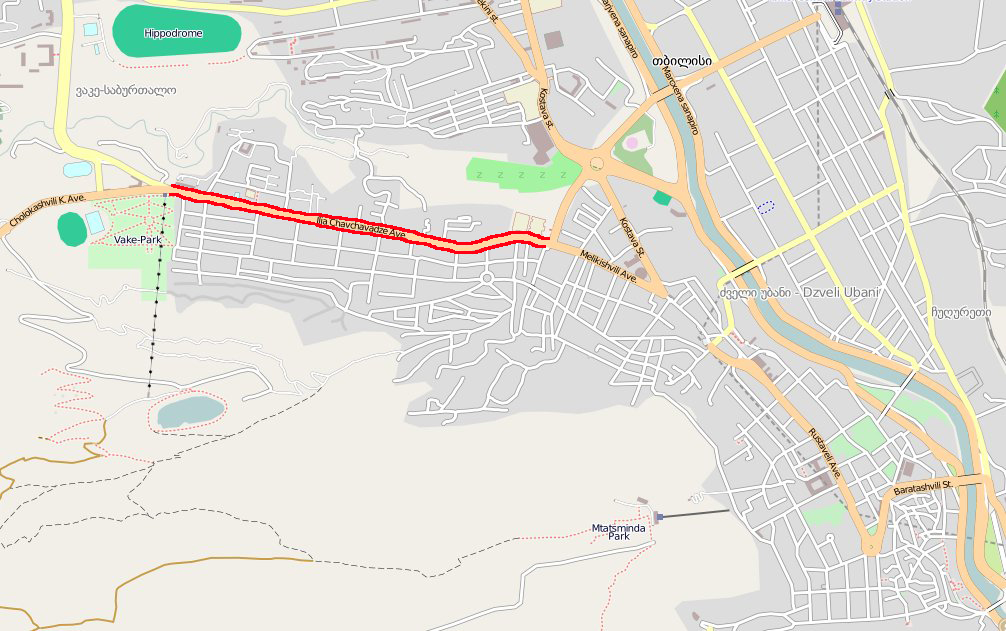
- Native name: ილია ჭავჭავაძის გამზირი (Georgian)
- Former name: Nikolai Marr Street
- Part of: Vake, Vake District, Tbilisi
- Namesake: Ilia Chavchavadze
- Length: 2.5 km (1.6 mi)
- Width: 40 mi

Construction
- Construction start: 1930s

Ilia Chavchavadze Avenue (Georgian: ილია ჭავჭავაძის გამზირი) is one of the main avenues of Tbilisi and is named after the writer Ilia Chavchavadze. The avenue is located on the right bank of the Kura River in the Vake district of Tbilisi and is a continuation of Melikishvili and Rustaveli Avenue. It was originally, from 1935 to 1957, named Niko Marr Street after the orientalist Nicholas Marr.

== Gallery ==
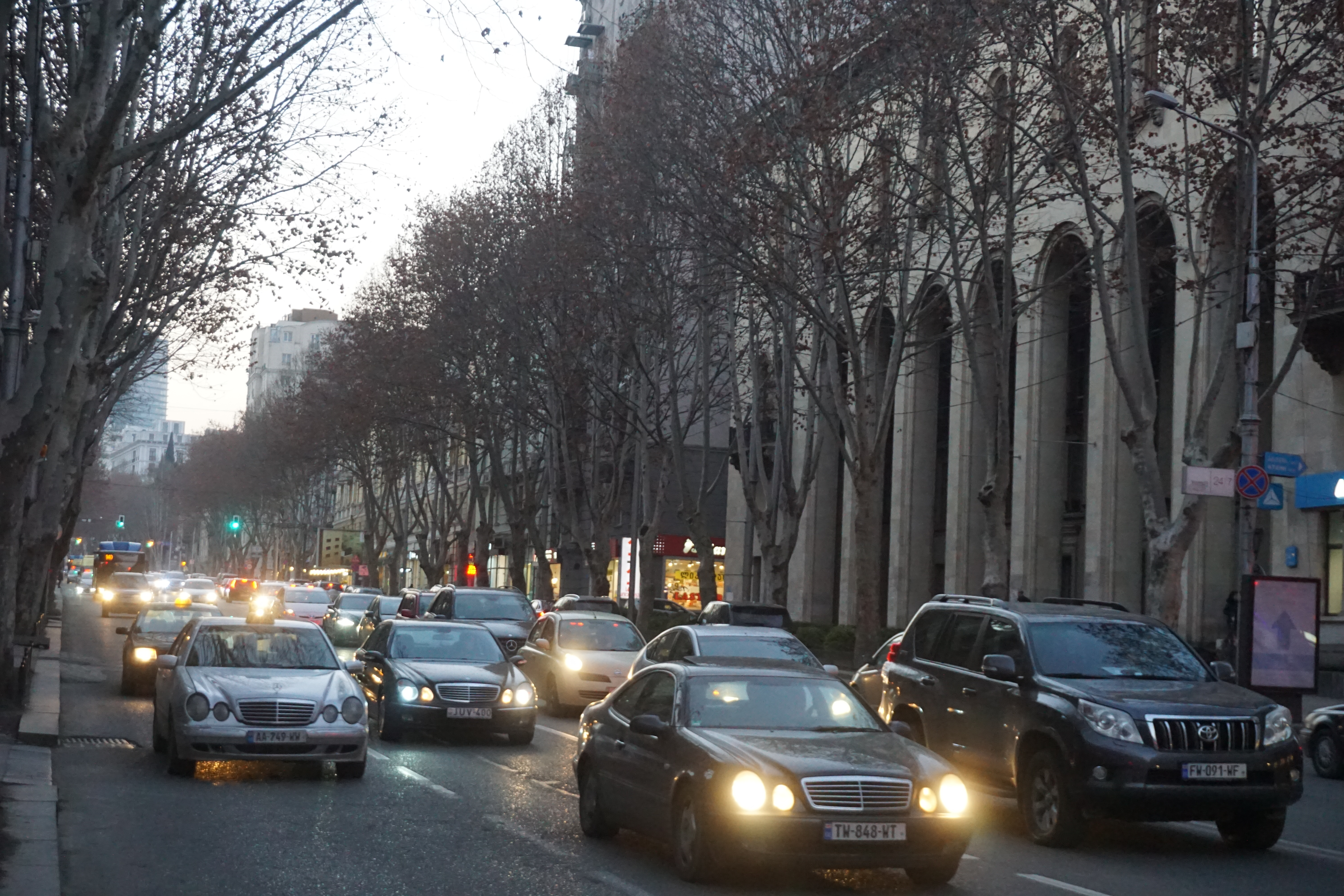

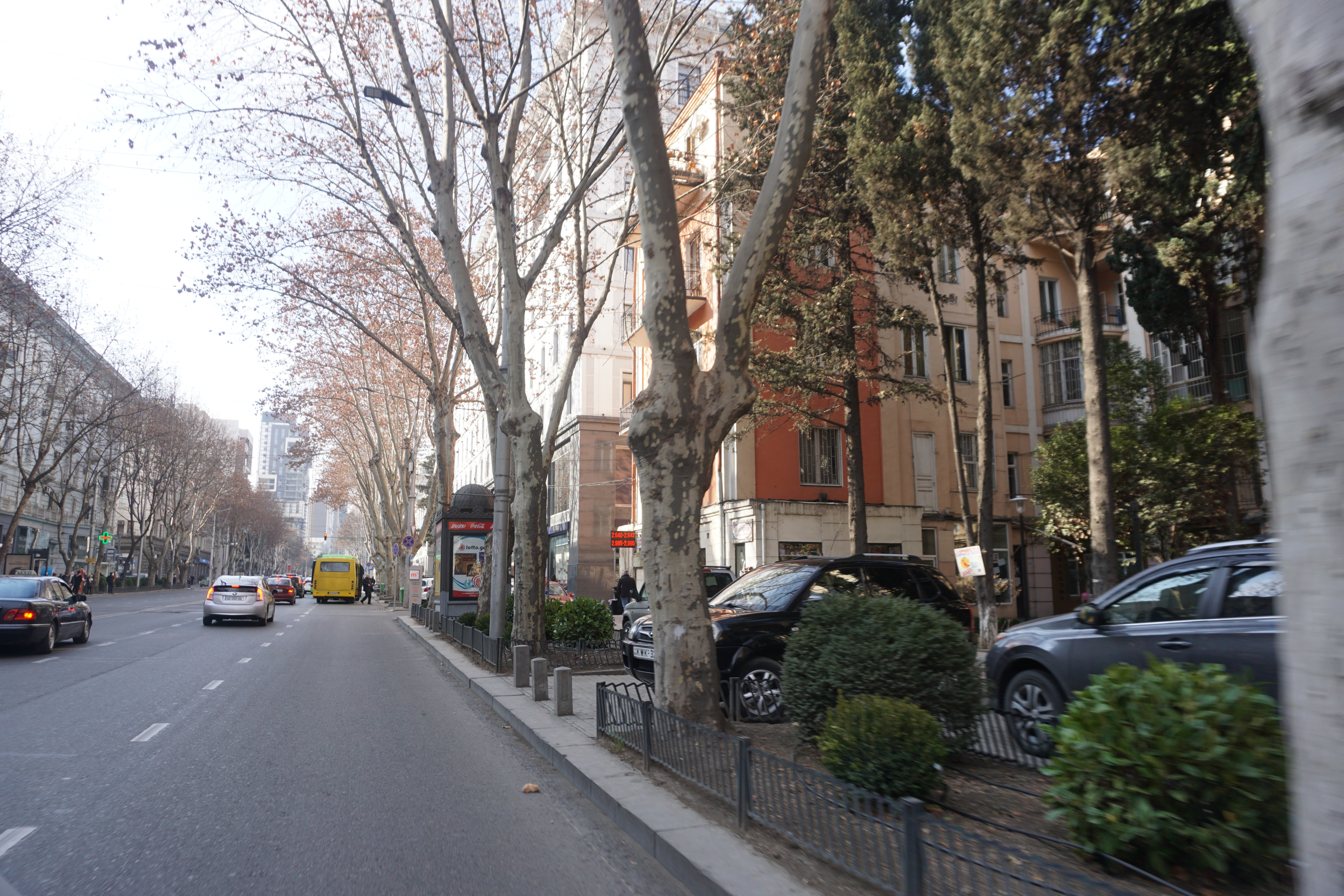

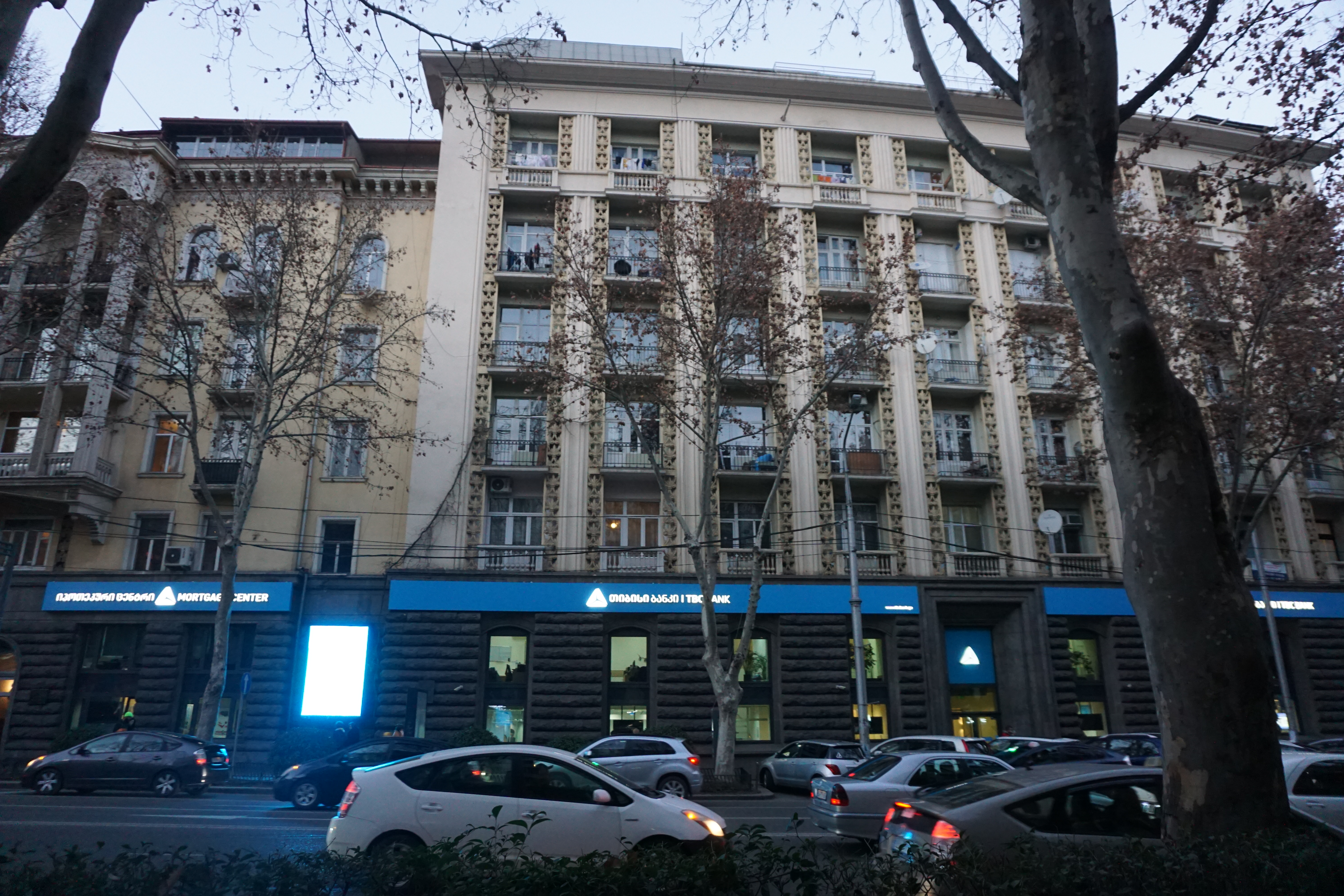
