= Akhaldaba =

Akhaldaba ახალდაბა
- Borough
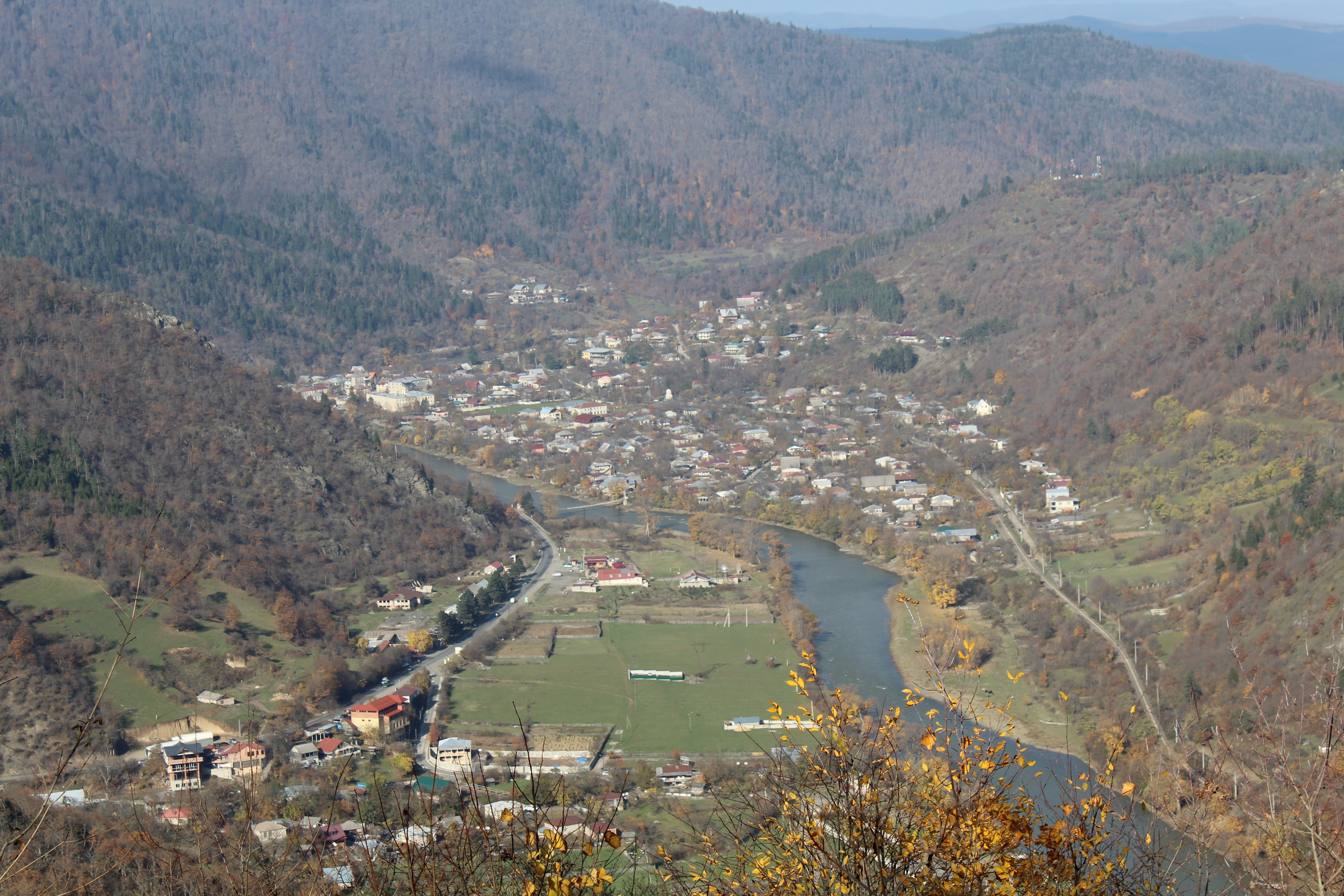
- Akhaldaba in 2021

- Location within Georgia
- Coordinates: 41°55′49″N 43°29′11″E
- Country: Georgia
- Region: Samtskhe–Javakheti
- Municipality: Borjomi

Population
  - Estimate (2020): 1,800
- Time zone: UTC+4 (Georgian Time)

Akhaldaba (Georgian: ახალდაბა) is a daba in Borjomi Municipality in the Samtskhe–Javakheti region of Georgia. The daba has a population of 1,800, as of 2020.

Akhaldaba Tower is located in the village.
