= Kulashi =

Kulashi კულაში
- Town
- Interactive map of Kulashi
- Location of Kulashi in Georgia Location of Kulashi in Imereti
- Coordinates: 42°12′15″N 42°20′44″E
- Country: Georgia
- Mkhare: Imereti
- District: Samtredia District

Population (2014)
  - Total: 1,702
- Time zone: UTC+4 (Georgian Time)
- Climate: Cfa

Kulashi (Georgian: კულაში [kʼuɫäʃi]) is a small town (daba) in Imereti, Georgia with a population of around 1,702 as of 2014. It is located 5 km from the town of Samtredia. It first appears in the 16th century records as a fief of the Mikeladze family. It was granted the status of daba in 1961.

Kulashi had formerly been a home to one of the largest Georgian Jewish communities, whose size has significantly decreased due to several waves of Jewish expatriation to Israel. As such, it had sometimes been referred to as the "Jerusalem of Georgia". Among the prominent Jews who came from Kulashi are Chabad Rabbi Yehuda Butrushvili (known in Yiddish as Yudel Kulasher), Ephraim Gur and businessman Merab Elashvili.

== See also ==
- Imereti
