= Daba (settlement) =

Type of settlement in Georgia

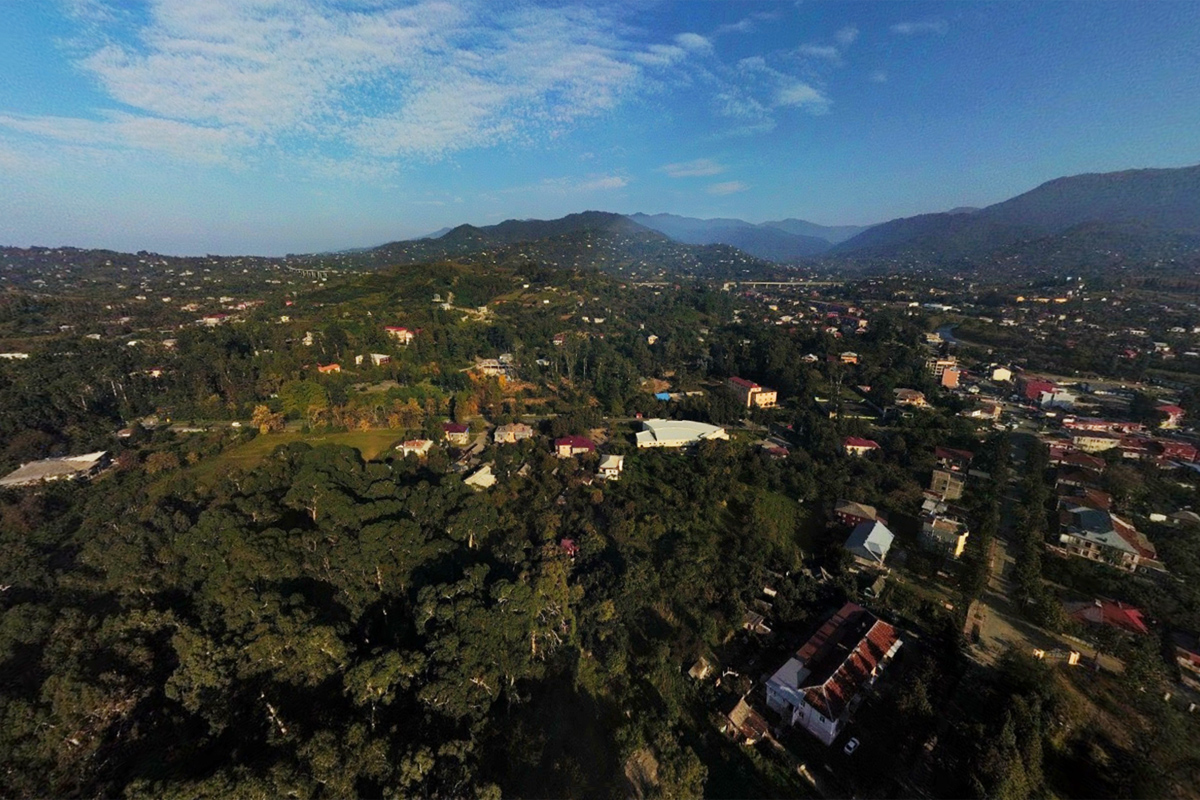
The daba of Chakvi in Adjara

Daba (Georgian: დაბა) is a type of human settlement in Georgia, a "small town". It is equivalent to an urban-type settlement in some other countries of the former Soviet Union.

In present-day Georgia, daba is typically defined as a settlement with a population of no fewer than 3,000 and established social and technical infrastructure, which enables it to function as a local economic and cultural center; it, furthermore, should not possess large agricultural lands. The status of daba can also be granted to a settlement with a population of fewer than 3,000, provided it functions as an administrative center of the district (municipality) or has a prospect of further economic and population growth in the nearest future.

== Etymology ==
Daba is the term well known in Old Georgian, where it had the meaning "cornfield, hamlet". It is derived from a Common Kartvelian root *dab(a), which is also a source of the Svan däb, "cornfield", and, possibly, the Mingrelian dobera (dobira), "arable land". The derivative words are udabno, "desert", and mdabali, "low". The name daba is also a basis for several placenames in Georgia, such as Daba, Akhaldaba ("new daba"), Q'veldaba ("cheese daba"), and Dabadzveli ("old daba").

== List of daba in Georgia ==
As of 2011, 50 settlements are categorized in Georgia as daba. These, listed according to a population size (2002 census), are:

	Daba	Population (2002)	Status granted	District/Municipality	Region or autonomous republic	Note
1.	Surami	9,800	1926	Khashuri	Shida Kartli	
2.	Tskneti	8,200	1967	Vake District, Tbilisi	Tbilisi	
3.	Chakvi	8,100	1954	Kobuleti	Autonomous Republic of Adjara	
4.	Kazreti	7,300	1965	Bolnisi	Kvemo Kartli	
5.	Khelvachauri	6,100	1968	Khelvachauri	Autonomous Republic of Adjara	
6.	Ochkhamuri	5,000	1954	Kobuleti	Autonomous Republic of Adjara	
7.	Chkhorotsqu	5,000	1960	Chkhorotsqu	Samegrelo-Zemo Svaneti	
8.	Laituri	3,600	1953	Ozurgeti	Guria	
9.	Tianeti	3,600	1960	Tianeti	Mtskheta-Mtianeti	
10.	Shaumiani	3,600	1932	Marneuli	Kvemo Kartli	
11.	Agara	3,500	1934	Kareli	Shida Kartli	
12.	Makhinjauri	3,400	1959	Khelvachauri	Autonomous Republic of Adjara	
13.	Aspindza	3,200	1961	Aspindza	Samtskhe-Javakheti	
14.	Manglisi	2,800	1926	Tetritsqaro	Kvemo Kartli	
15.	Kveda Nasakirali	2,600	1976	Ozurgeti	Guria	
16.	Mestia	2,600	1968	Mestia	Samegrelo-Zemo Svaneti	
17.	Akhalgori	2,500	1960	Akhalgori	Mtskheta-Mtianeti	Controlled by the Republic of South Ossetia; Russian-occupied territory under the Law of Georgia on Occupied Territories (431-IIs, October 23, 2008)
18.	Kharagauli	2,400	1944	Kharagauli	Imereti	
19.	Akhaldaba	2,400	1965	Borjomi	Samtskhe-Javakheti	
20.	Didi Lilo	2,400	1974	Tbilisi	Tbilisi	
21.	Chokhatauri	2,100	1947	Chokhatauri	Guria	
22.	Kulashi	2,000	1961	Samtredia	Imereti	
23.	Bakuriani	2,000	1926	Borjomi	Samtskhe-Javakheti	
24.	Zhinvali	1,900	1976	Dusheti	Mtskheta-Mtianeti	
25.	Kojori	1,900	1968	Tbilisi	Tbilisi	
26.	Stepantsminda	1,800	1966	Kazbegi	Mtskheta-Mtianeti	
27.	Lentekhi	1,700	1969	Lentekhi	Racha-Lechkhumi and Kvemo Svaneti	
28.	Shorapani	1,600	1938	Zestaponi	Imereti	
29.	Pasanauri	1,600	1966	Dusheti	Mtskheta-Mtianeti	
30.	Ureki	1,400	1953	Ozurgeti	Guria	
31.	Abastumani	1,400	1926	Adigeni	Samtskhe-Javakheti	
32.	Naruja	1,300	1987	Ozurgeti	Guria	
33.	Keda	1,200	1966	Keda	Autonomous Republic of Adjara	
34.	Khulo	1,100	1964	Khulo	Autonomous Republic of Adjara	
35.	Tsagveri	1,100	1926	Borjomi	Samtskhe-Javakheti	
36.	Adigeni	1,000	1961	Adigeni	Samtskhe-Javakheti	
37.	Shuakhevi	0,900	1974	Shuakhevi	Autonomous Republic of Adjara	
38.	Bakurianis Andeziti	0,500	1956	Borjomi	Samtskhe-Javakheti	
39.	Sioni	0,400	1960	Tianeti	Mtskheta-Mtianeti	
40.	Tamarisi	0,400	1982	Marneuli	Kvemo Kartli	
41.	Bediani	0,300	1963	Tsalka	Samtskhe-Javakheti	
42.	Trialeti	0,300	1944	Tsalka	Kvemo Kartli	
43.	Kharistvala	0,000	1956	Ambrolauri	Racha-Lechkhumi and Kvemo Svaneti	Depopulated as a result of the 1991 earthquake and a series of avalanches
44.	Bichvinta	-	1963	Gagra	Autonomous Republic of Abkhazia	Controlled by the Republic of Abkhazia; Russian-occupied territory under the Law of Georgia on Occupied Territories (431-IIs, October 23, 2008)
45.	Gantiadi	-	1966	Gagra	Autonomous Republic of Abkhazia	Controlled by the Republic of Abkhazia; Russian-occupied territory under the Law of Georgia on Occupied Territories (431-IIs, October 23, 2008)
46.	Miusera	-	1990	Gudauta	Autonomous Republic of Abkhazia	Controlled by the Republic of Abkhazia; Russian-occupied territory under the Law of Georgia on Occupied Territories (431-IIs, October 23, 2008)
47.	Gulripshi	-	1975	Gulripshi	Autonomous Republic of Abkhazia	Controlled by the Republic of Abkhazia; Russian-occupied territory under the Law of Georgia on Occupied Territories (431-IIs, October 23, 2008)
48.	Kornisi	-	-	Kareli	Shida Kartli	Controlled by the Republic of South Ossetia; Russian-occupied territory under the Law of Georgia on Occupied Territories (431-IIs, October 23, 2008)
49.	Kvaisa	-	-	Oni	Racha-Lechkhumi and Kvemo Svaneti	Controlled by the Republic of South Ossetia; Russian-occupied territory under the Law of Georgia on Occupied Territories (431-IIs, October 23, 2008)
50.	Java	-	-	Java	Shida Kartli	Controlled by the Republic of South Ossetia; Russian-occupied territory under the Law of Georgia on Occupied Territories (431-IIs, October 23, 2008)

== See also ==
- List of cities and towns in Georgia
