= Borjomi Municipality =

Coordinates: 41°50′N 43°23′E

Borjomi Municipality ბორჯომის მუნიციპალიტეტი
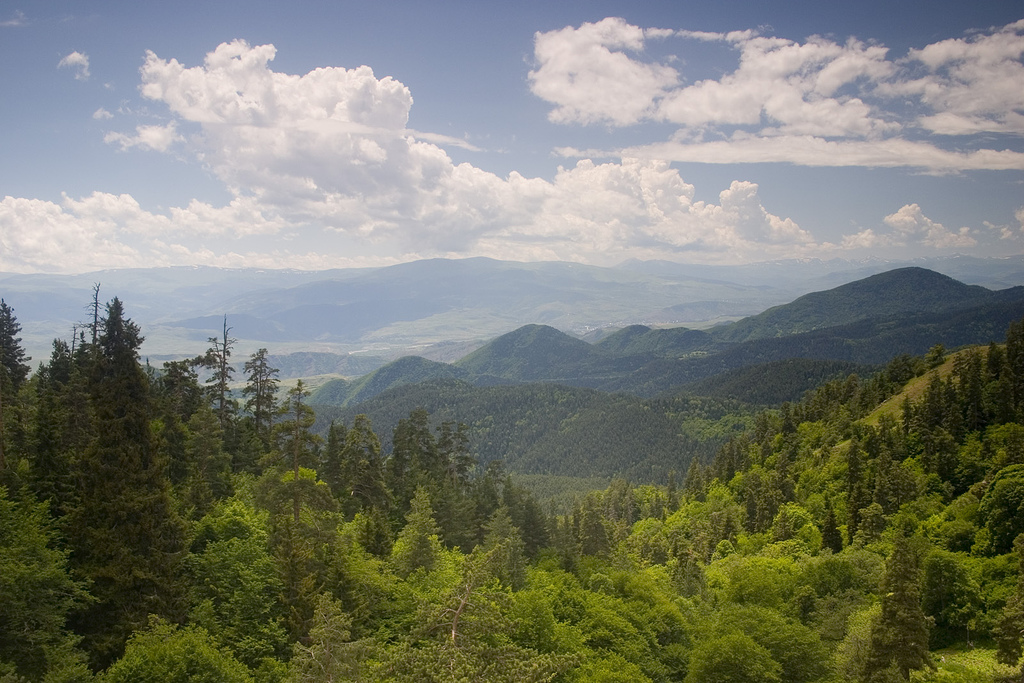
- Borjomi mountains

- Flag Seal

- Country: Georgia
- Mkhare: Samtskhe-Javakheti
- Capital: Borjomi

Government
  - Type: Mayor–Council
  - Body: Borjomi Municipal Assembly
  - Mayor: Otar Arbolishvili (GD)

Area
  - Total: 1,189 km^{2} (459 sq mi)

Population (2021)
  - Total: 24,998
  - Density: 21.02/km^{2} (54.45/sq mi)

Population by ethnicity
  - Georgians: 87.2 %
  - Armenians: 8.6 %
  - Ossetians: 1.3 %
  - Greeks: 1.2 %
  - Russians: 1.1 %
- Time zone: UTC+4 (Georgian Time)
- Website: https://borjomi.gov.ge/

Borjomi (Georgian: ბორჯომის მუნიციპალიტეტი, Borjomis munitsip'alit'et'i) is a municipality in southern Georgia, in the region of Samtskhe-Javakheti with a population of 24,998 (2021). Its main town and administrative center is Borjomi and it has an area of 1,189 km^{2} (459 sq mi). Borjomi municipality is located on the territory of the historical Tori.

== Geography and climate ==
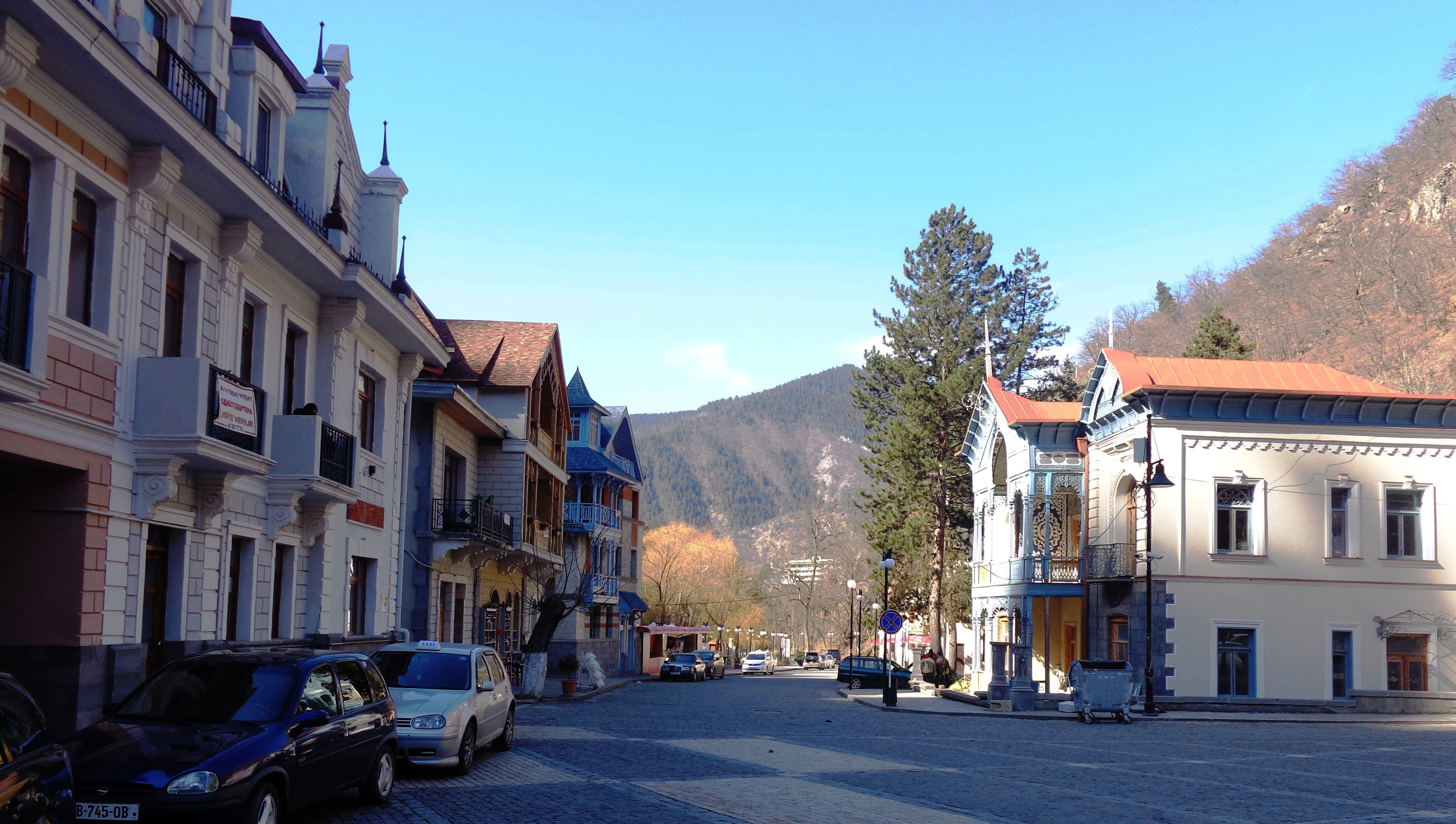
street in Borjomi

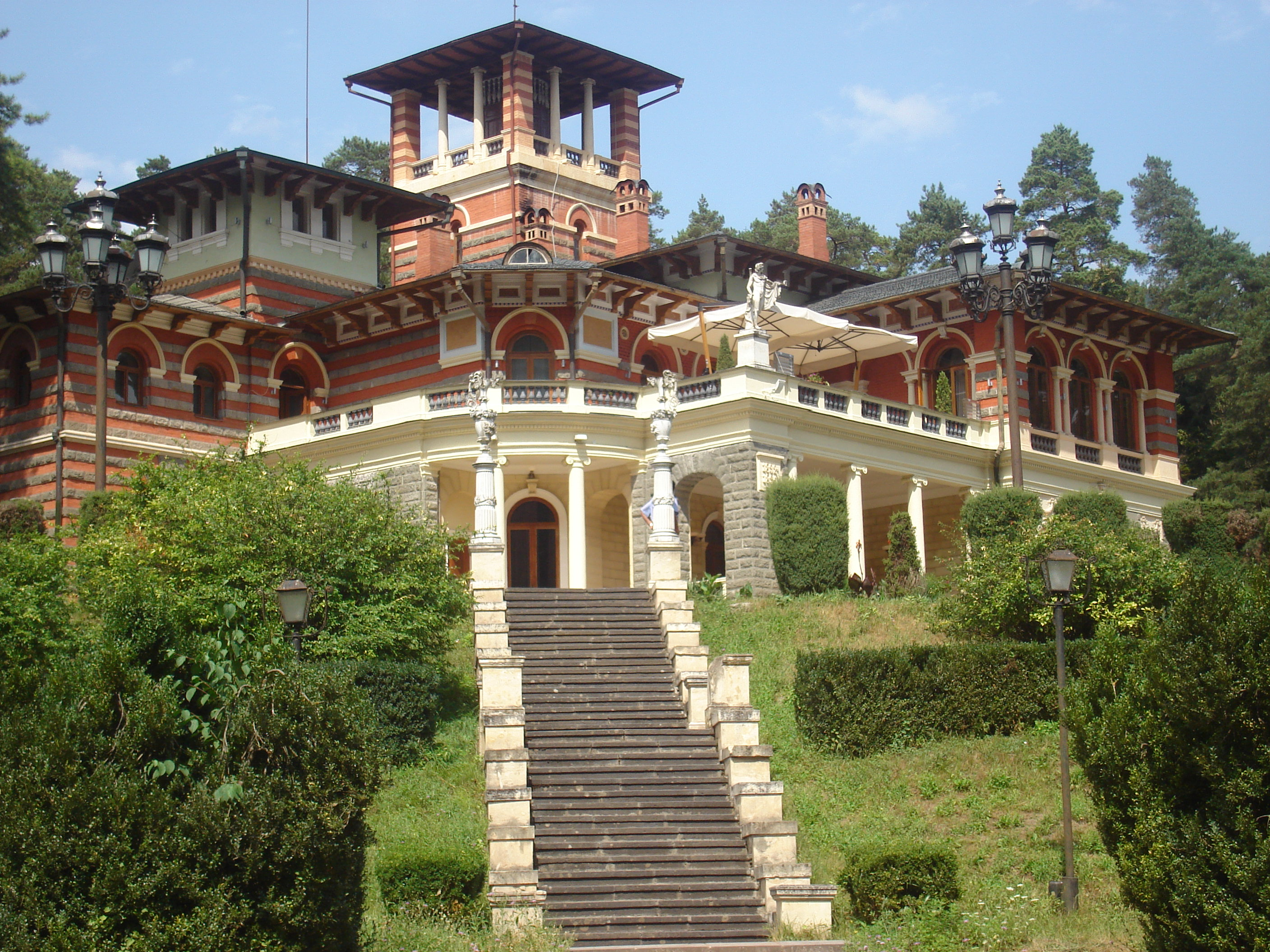
Likani Palace

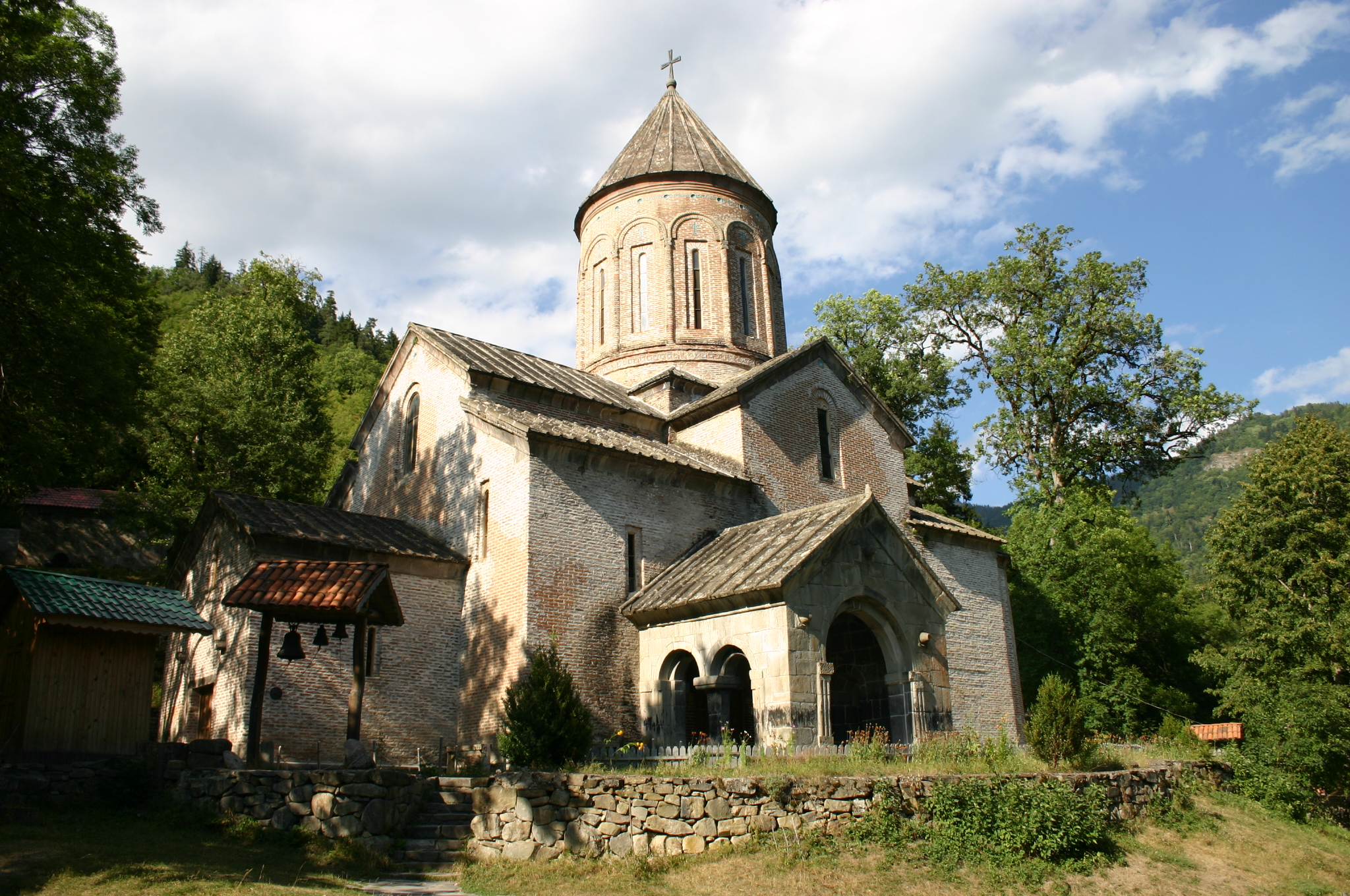
Timotesubani Monastery

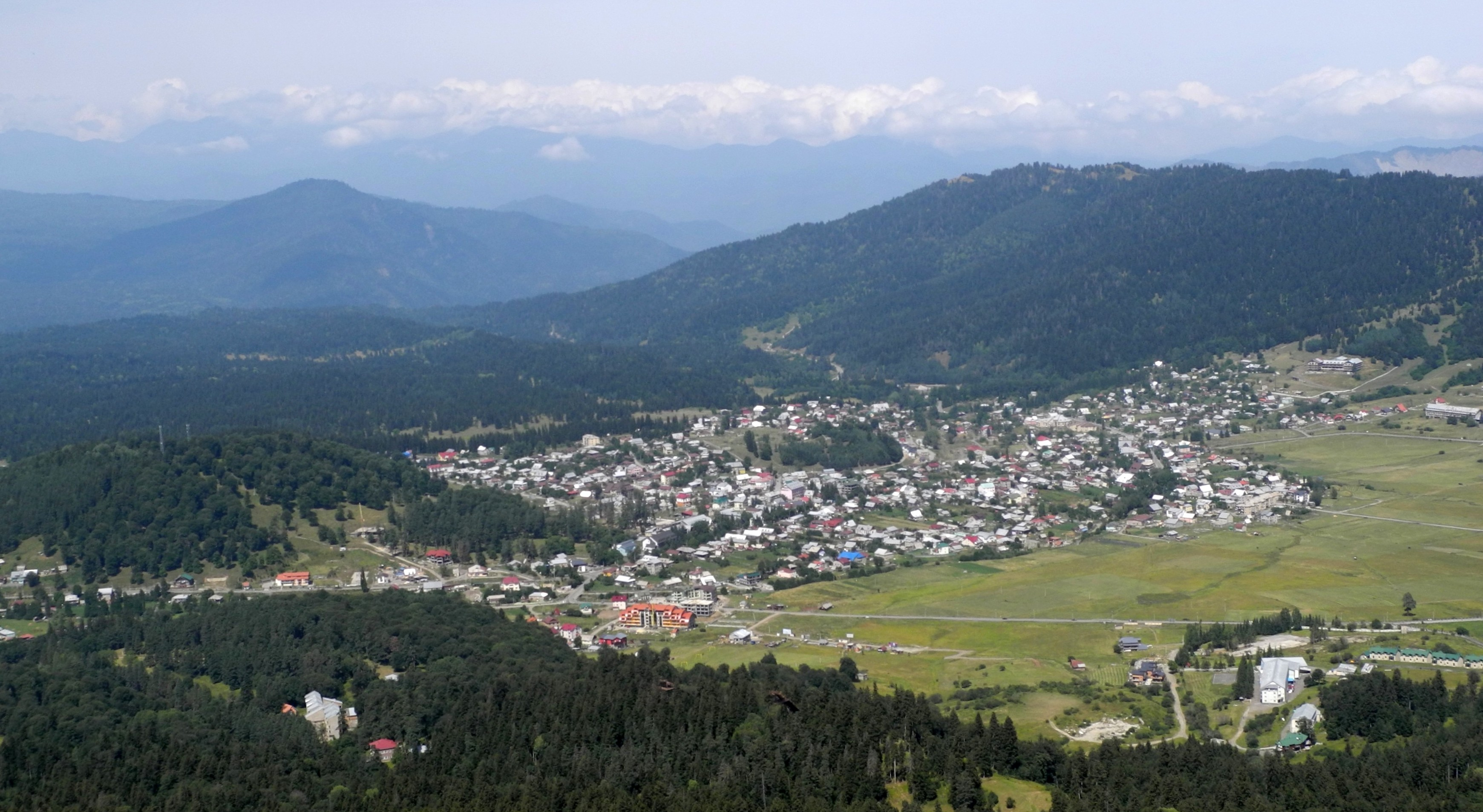
Bakuriani

Borjomi municipality borders Akhaltsikhe in the southwest, Aspindza and Akhalkalaki in the south, Tsalka in the east, Kharagauli, Khashuri, Kareli Municipality and Gori Municipality in the north. The municipality consists in large part of subranges of the Lesser Caucasus mountains, the western end of the Trialeti Range and the eastern end of the Meskheti Range which are separated by the Borjomi Gorge through which the Mtkvari river flows.

Within the municipality, there are branches of the Trialeti Range - the Gvirgvini range and Tsikhisdzhvari, the peaks of which reach 2000–2850 meters above sea level. Between the main ridge of the Trialeti Range and the Gvirgvini subrange the Tori basin is located. The municipality is lying on both sides of the Mtkvari River. From the right side merges the Borjomula and Gujaretistskali. Rivers are used for both irrigation and energy purposes. There are many lakes in Borjomi. Among them, Tabatskuri and Kahisi, in addition to beauty, are also rich in precious fish. The region has many mineral springs, which are its main fossil wealth. The municipality of Borjomi is located at the transition place between continental subtropics and marine subtropics with a transitional climate with cold winters and long summers. The average annual temperature in January is −3 to −6 °C; and in August, 14 to 18 °C.

== Administrative divisions ==
Borjomi municipality is administratively divided into 11 administrative units (communities, თემი, temi), these include Akhaldaba, Bakuriani, Balanta, Borjomi, Dviri, Tabatskuri, Tadzrisi, Tba, Kvibisi, Tsikhisdzhvari, Tsagveri. The municipality has one city (the municipal centre Borjomi), three daba (Akhaldaba, Bakuriani, Tsagveri) and 40 villages (სოფელი, sopeli). In 2018 the borough (daba) Bakurianis Andeziti wad downgraded to village.

- City: Borjomi
- Boroughs: Akhaldaba, Bakuriani, Tsagveri
- Villages: Bakurianis Andeziti, Didi Mitarbi, Patara Mitarbi, Sakochavi, Tsemi, Patara Tsemi, Daba, Timotesubani, Mzetamze, Balanta, Chirakhula, Gverdisubani, Vardevani, Machartsqali, Ghvtismshobeli, Tsinubani, Gujareti, Odeti, Ghinturi, Tsitelsopeli, Dviri, Kvabiskhevi, Chitakhevi, Chobiskhevi, Tabatskhuri, Moliti, Tadzrisi, Dgvari, Sakire, Tba, Libani, Sadgeri, Qvibisi, Vardgineti, Zanavi, Kortaneti, Rveli, Tsikhisjvari

== Politics ==
Borjomi Municipal Assembly (Georgian: ბორჯომის საკრებულო, Borjomi Sakrebulo) is the representative body in Borjomi Municipality, consisting of 33 members which are elected every four years. The last election was held in October 2021. Otar Arbolishvili of Georgian Dream was elected mayor.

Party	2017	2021	Current Municipal Assembly
Georgian Dream	13	22	
United National Movement	2	7	
People's Power		2 (Note: Split from Georgian Dream.)	
Alliance of Patriots	11	1	
For Georgia		1	
European Georgia	1		
Labour Party	1		
Total	28	33	

== Population ==
By the start of 2021 the population was determined at 24,998 people, a minor decrease compared to the 2014 census. The population density of the municipality is 21 inhabitants per square kilometre (54/sq mi). 60.1% of the population lives in urbanized settlements (cities or daba).

The vast majority (87%) of the population of Borjomi is Georgian. The largest ethnic minority by far are the Armenians (8.6%). Other minorities include Ossetians (1.3%), Greeks (1.2%), Russians (1.1%), Ukrainians (0.3%) and minimal numbers of Azerbaijanis, Jews, Assyrians and Abkhazians. In terms of religion, more than 94% of the population consists of followers of the Georgian Orthodox Church and 3.9% are followers of the Armenian Apostolic Church, followed by Jehovah's Witnesses (0.5%), and a few dozen Catholics and Muslims.

Population Borjomi Municipality
	1886	1922	1926	1939	1959	1970	1979	1989	2002	2014	2021
Borjomi Municipality	-	-	-	37,437	▲37,010	▲39,661	▲40,796	▲41,266	▼32,422	▼25,214	▼24,998
Borjomi city	-	▲3,913	▲5,372	▲14,317	▲15,332	▲16,316	▲18,059	▲19,007	▼14,445	▼10,546	▲11,122
Akhaldaba (daba)	-	-	-	-	-	▼2,583	▼2,504	▲2,440	▼2,377	▼1,586	▲1,786
Bakuriani (daba)	-	-	823	▲1,773	▲4,650	▼4,361	▲4,395	▲4,588	▼1,985	▼1,879	▼1,665
Bakurianis Andeziti (Note: Degraded in 2018 from daba to village.)	-	-	-	-	-	403	▼387	▲488	▲514	▼352	(Note: Last published number of 2018.) ▲457
Tsagveri (daba)	-	-	596	▲1,225	▲3,187	▼1,275	▼1,192	▼1,144	▼1,051	▼799	▼701
Data: Population statistics Georgia 1897 to present. Note: (Note: The 2014 census found an inexplicable gap with the data from the national statistical office Geostat. UN-assisted research has found the 2002 census was inflated by about 8-9 percent. See, "1. Introduction", Page 1.)

== Tourism and Historical sites ==
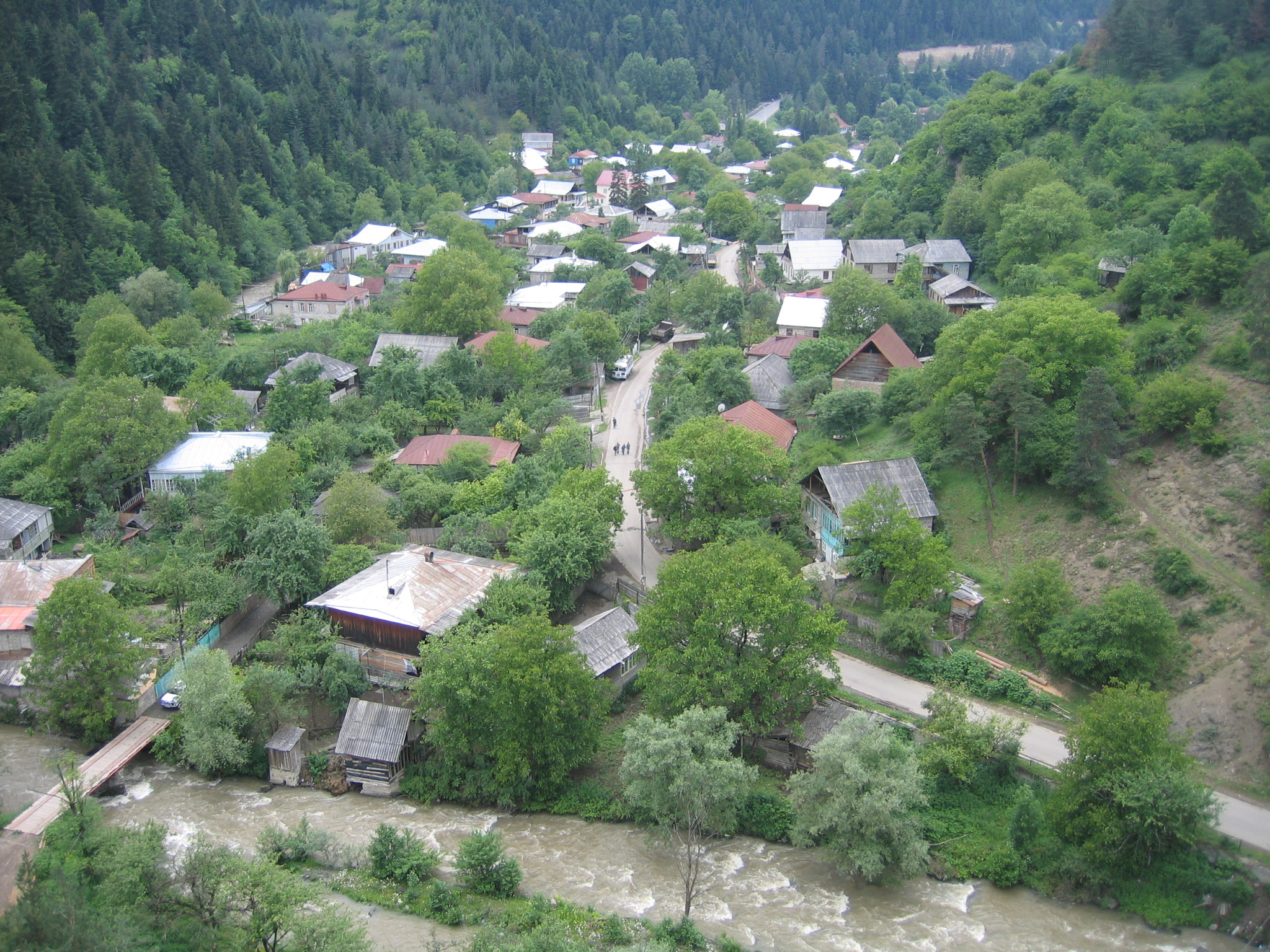
Tsagveri

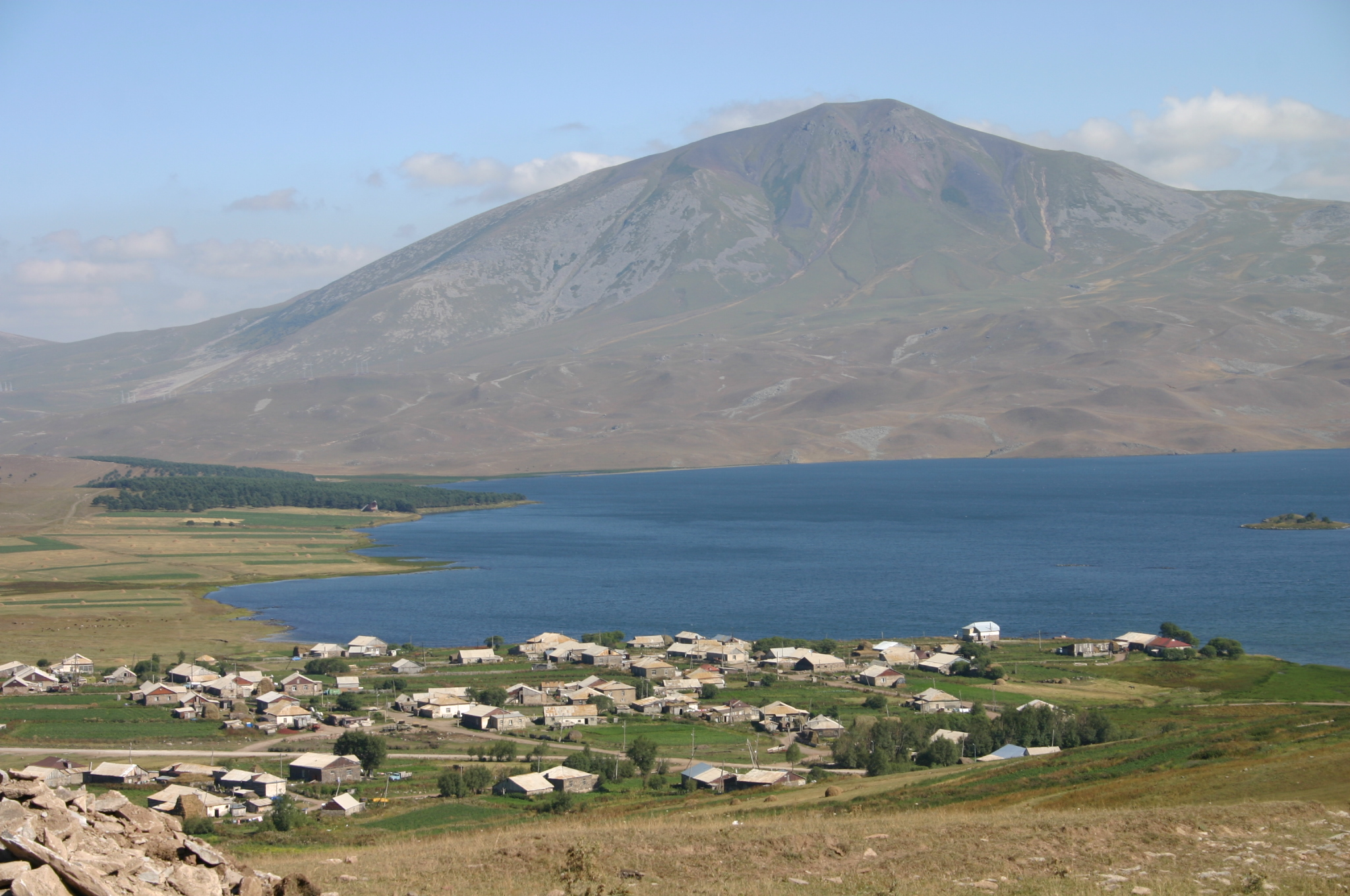
Tabatskuri

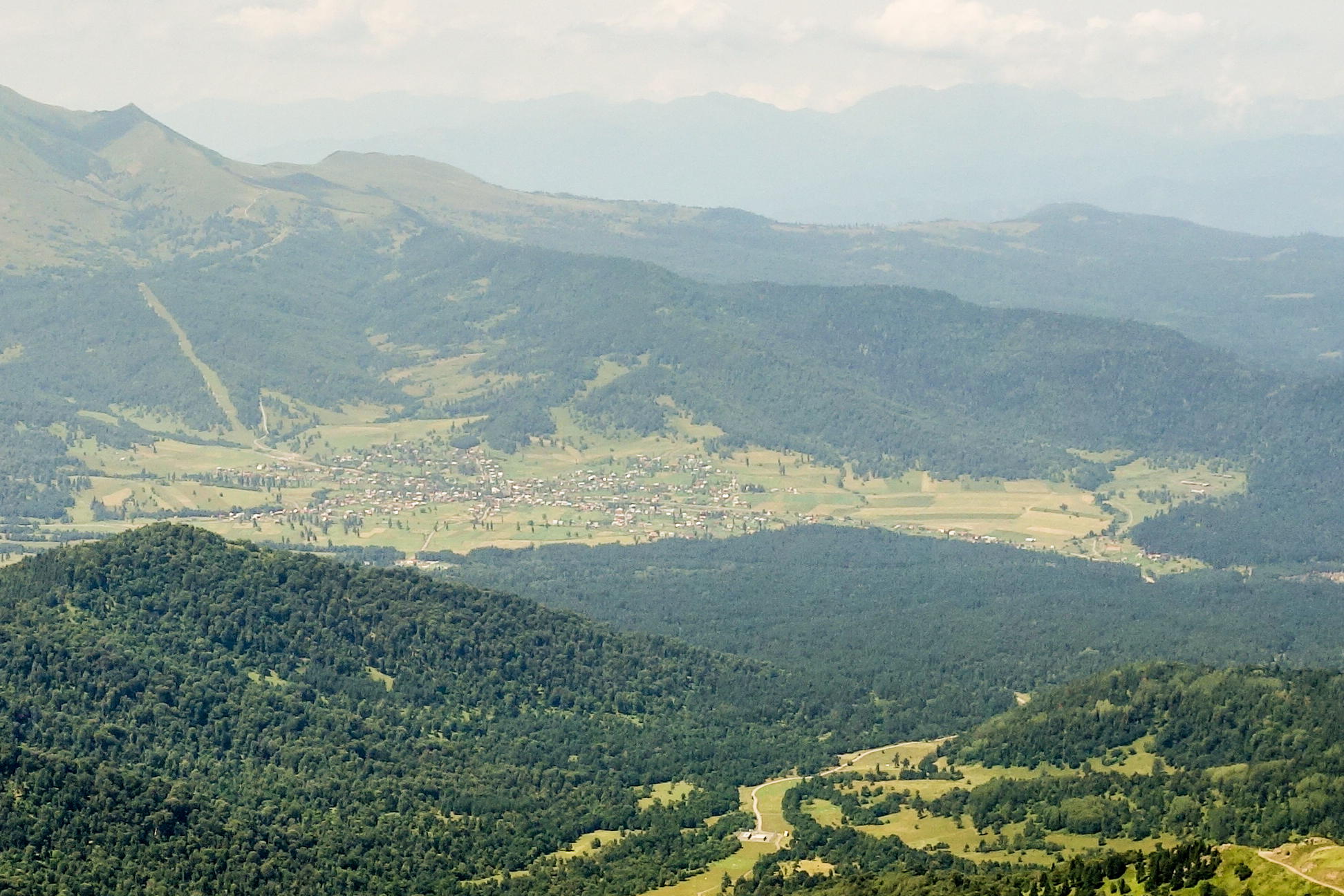
Tsikhisjvari

=== Cultural monuments ===
- Green Monastery
- Timotesubani Monastery
- Potoleti Church
- Daba St. George's Church
- Peter's Castle
- Dviri Fortress

=== Nature ===
- Borjomi-Kharagauli National Park
- Nedzvi National Park
- Lomis mta
- Kakhisi Lake
- Tsero Lake
- Meghruki Gorge

=== Resorts ===
- Borjomi
- Bakuriani
- Likani
- Mitarbi
- Kokhta
- Tsikhisdzhvari
- Tsemi
- Tsagveri

== See also ==
- List of municipalities in Georgia (country)
