= Bakurianis Andeziti =

Bakurianis Andeziti ბაკურიანის ანდეზიტი
- Borough
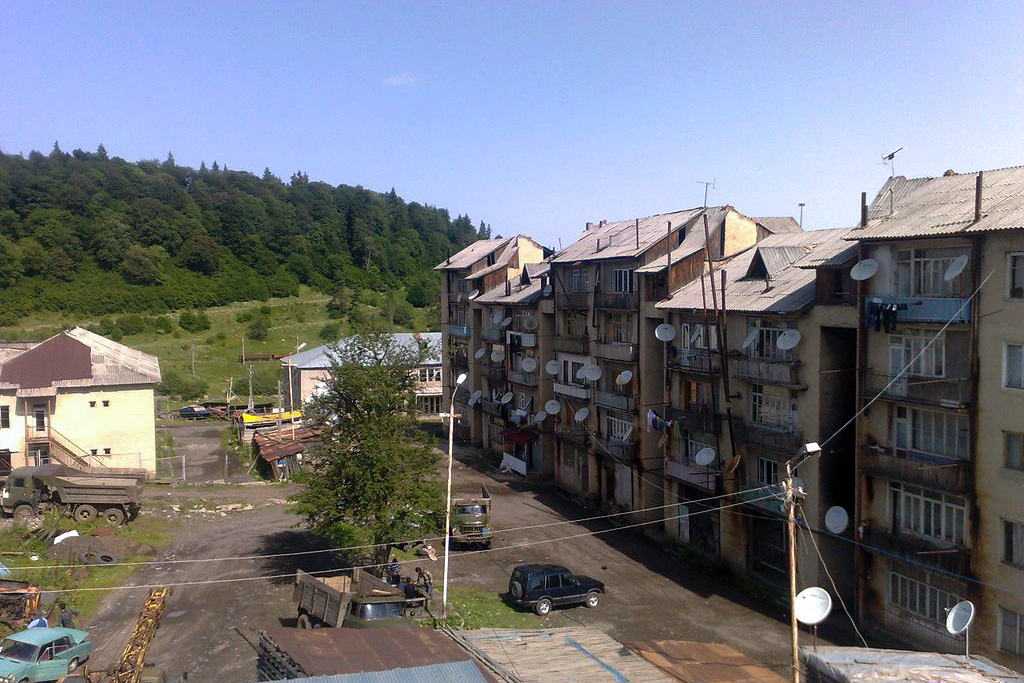

- Location within Georgia
- Coordinates: 41°44′07″N 43°28′25″E
- Country: Georgia
- Region: Samtskhe–Javakheti
- Municipality: Borjomi

Population
  - Estimate (2014): 352
- Time zone: UTC+4 (Georgian Time)

Bakurianis Andeziti (Georgian: ბაკურიანის ანდეზიტი) is a village in Borjomi Municipality in the Samtskhe–Javakheti region of Georgia. The village has a population of 352, as of 2014.

Bakurianis Andeziti was granted daba status in 1956 but was downgraded to a village in 2018.
