= Efraim Gur =

Israeli politician (born 1955)

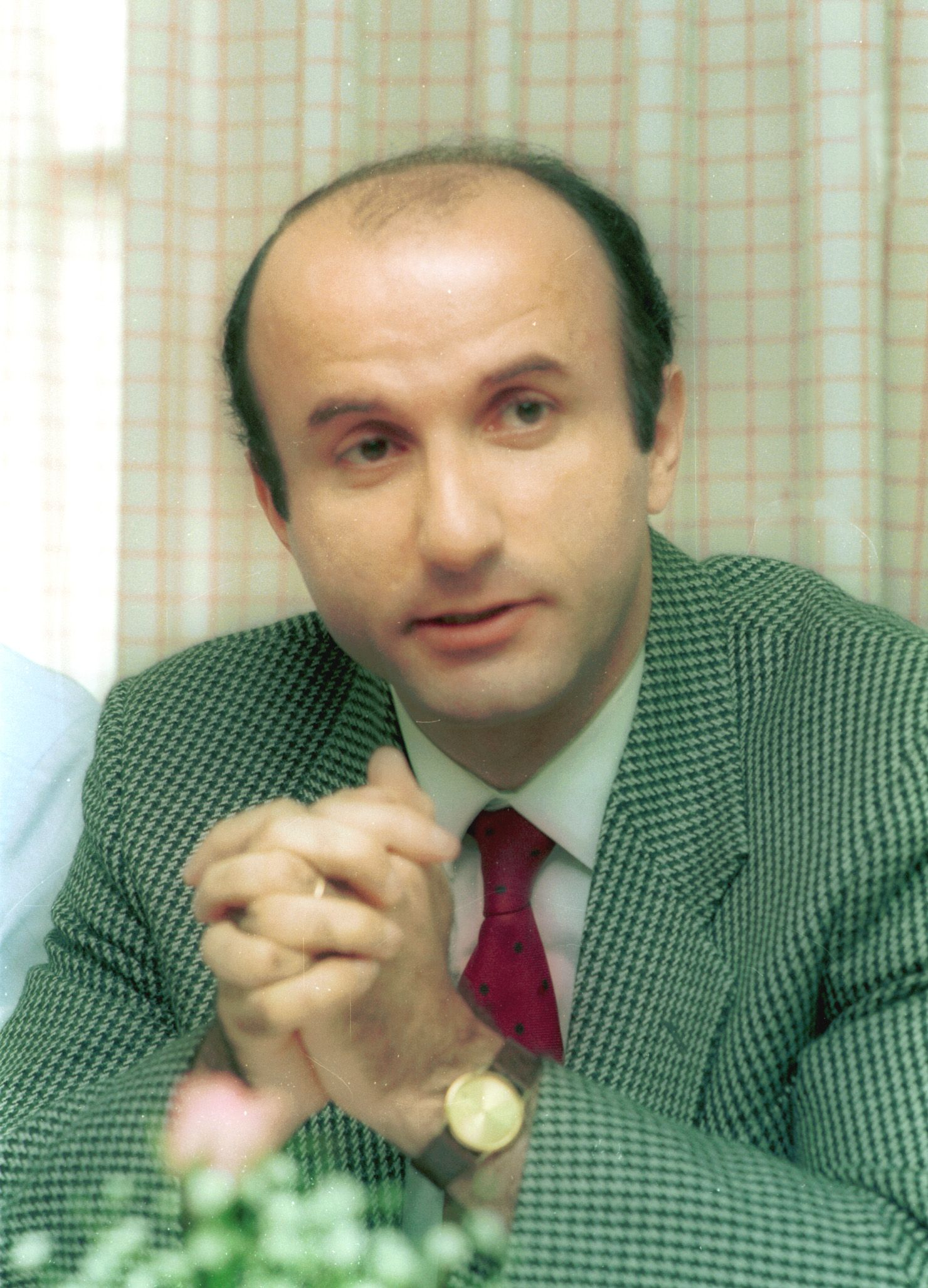
- Gur in 1990

Faction represented in the Knesset
- 1988–1992: Alignment
- 1990–1992: Unity for Peace and Immigration
- 1992–1996: Likud

Personal details
- Born: 1 September 1955 (age 71) Kulashi, Soviet Union

Efraim Gur (Hebrew: אפרים גור; born 1 September 1955) is an Israeli former politician who served as a member of the Knesset between 1988 and 1996, and as Deputy Minister of Communications and Deputy Minister of Transportation in the early 1990s.

== Biography ==
Born Eprem Gorelishvili in Kulashi in the Georgian SSR of the Soviet Union in 1955, Gur emigrated to Israel in 1972, and worked as an insurance agent. He joined the Labor Party, becoming secretary of its Ashdod branch. He also served as deputy mayor of the city and as chair of the Ashdod Zionist Council.

In 1988 he was elected to the Knesset on the Alignment list (of which the Labor Party was the major component). However, following the dirty trick incident in 1990, he left the party to establish Unity for Peace and Immigration, and joined Yitzhak Shamir's Likud-led government. He was rewarded by being appointed Deputy Minister of Communications on 2 July, before becoming Deputy Minister of Transportation on 20 November.

Shortly before the 1992 elections Gur merged his faction into Likud, and was re-elected. On 7 March 1996 he left Likud and sat out the remainder of the term as an independent. He re-established his party to run in the May elections, renaming it Unity for the Defence of New Immigrants. However, it failed to cross the electoral threshold and he lost his seat.

He has served as chairman of the Union of Immigrants from the Former Soviet Union.

== See also ==
- 1970s Soviet Union aliyah
