= Tskneti =

Coordinates: 41°41′42″N 44°41′49″E

Tskneti წყნეთი
- Urban-type settlement (Daba) of Vake District
- Country: Georgia
- City: Tbilisi
- District (Raioni): Vake District
- Elevation: 950 m (3,120 ft)

Population (2014)
  - Total: 7 166
- Time zone: UTC+4 (Georgian Time)

Tskneti (Georgian: წყნეთი) is an urban-type settlement (Daba) in southwestern part of Vake District, Tbilisi, Georgia, on the right bank of the river Mtkvari.

== Geography ==
Tskneti is located on the eastern slopes of the Trialeti Range, in the gorge of the Vere River (right tributary of the Mtkvari), 8 km from the center of Tbilisi and 950 m above sea level.

== Climate ==
The daba of Tskneti has a warm humid continental climate, with mild winters and long warm summers. The average temperature is 13 °C. The warmest month is August, at 24 °C, and the coldest January, at −2 °C. The average rainfall is 738 millimeters per year. The wettest month is May, with 122 millimeters of rain, and the driest December, with 31 millimeters.

== History ==
Late Bronze Age pottery and tombs have been found in the vicinity of Tskneti. It has been known as a summer place since ancient times. Intensive summer development in lower Tskneti started in the second half of the 19th-century, in upper Tskneti – in the 20th-century. Three small churches of 17th–19th centuries are preserved. It received the status of a Daba in 1967. In 2008, it was incorporated into the city of Tbilisi.

== Bibliography ==
- Georgian Soviet Encyclopedia, V. 11, p. 372, Tbilisi, 1987
