= Vake Park =

Public park in Tbilisi, Georgia

- ვაკის პარკი
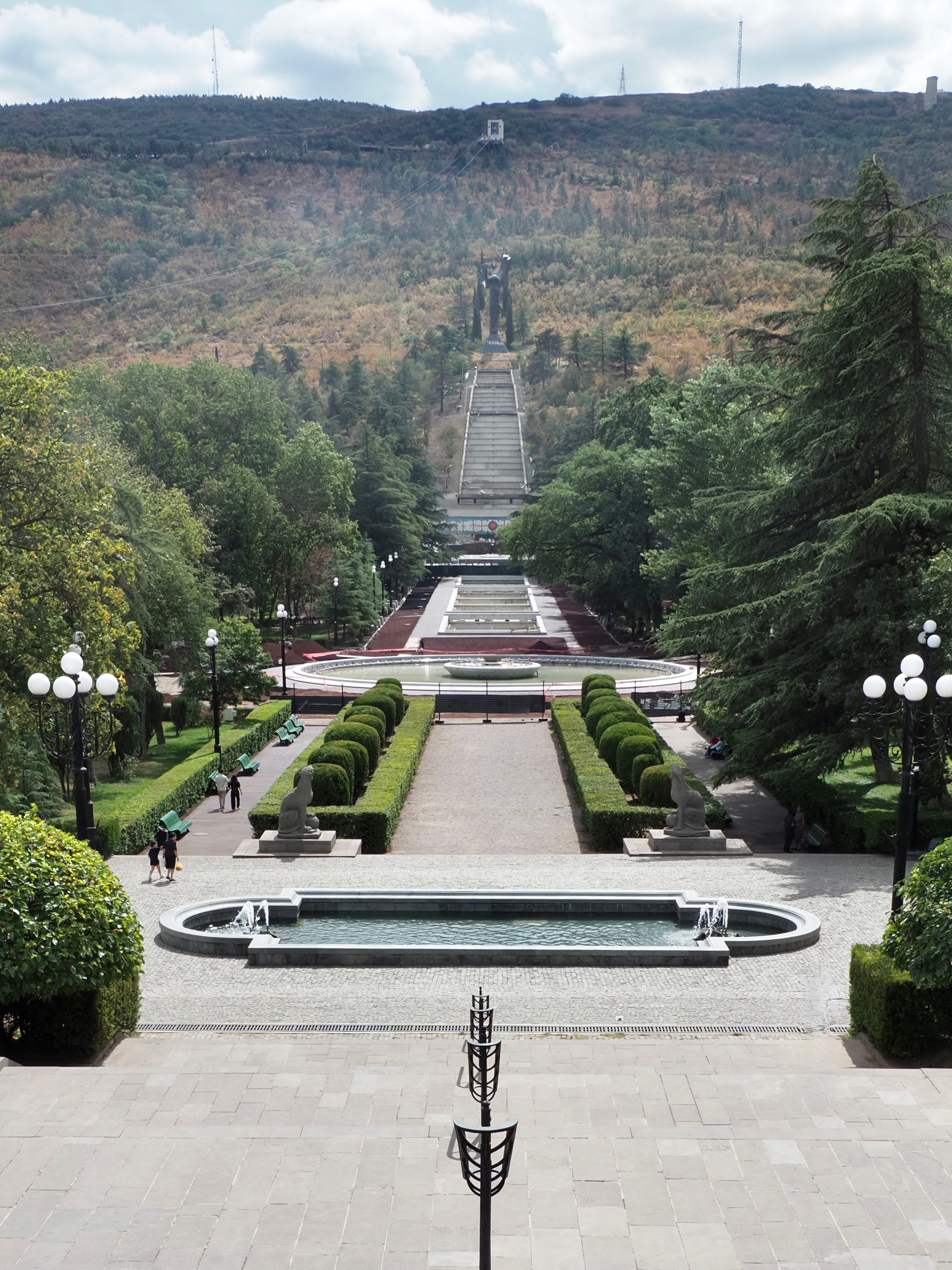
- Interactive map of Vake Park
- Type: Public park
- Location: Tbilisi, Georgia
- Coordinates: 41.708889°N 44.751389°E
- Area: 200 hectares (490 acres)
- Opened: 1946
- Status: Partially closed for restoration

Vake Park (Georgian: ვაკის პარკი) is a public park in Tbilisi. The park was opened in 1946 and is located in the Vake district of Tbilisi at the western end of Chavchavadze Avenue. A World War II memorial sits at the top of the hill in the park.

From the north, Vake Park and Chavchavadze Avenue are connected by a wide staircase. The staircase is located on the main axis of the park, which is extended by a whole cascade of fountains. The central axis of the park is completed by the World War II Glory Memorial on the Ridge. The central part of the park is separated by a fountain and a round pool.

The special charm of Vake Park is added by red sand, which is used to cover the roads. Vake Park has a children's town, open-air cinema, cafes and restaurants. In the southwest, the park ends with the Mikheil Meskhi Stadium.

== History ==
=== Incidents ===
On October 13, 2022, one day after the 2nd stage of restoration completed, three teenagers were electrocuted in the Round Fountain of the park trying to retrieve their ball. Two survived but one of them, a 13-year-old girl Marita Reparishvili died after being taken to the hospital. The incident caused outrage with people calling for Mayor Kakha Kaladze to resign and 9 individuals were arrested for suspected negligence resulting in the death of a person. The investigation of the incident is currently ongoing.
