= Vake, Tbilisi =

Neighborhood in Tbilisi, Georgia

Vake ვაკე
- Neighborhood of Vake District
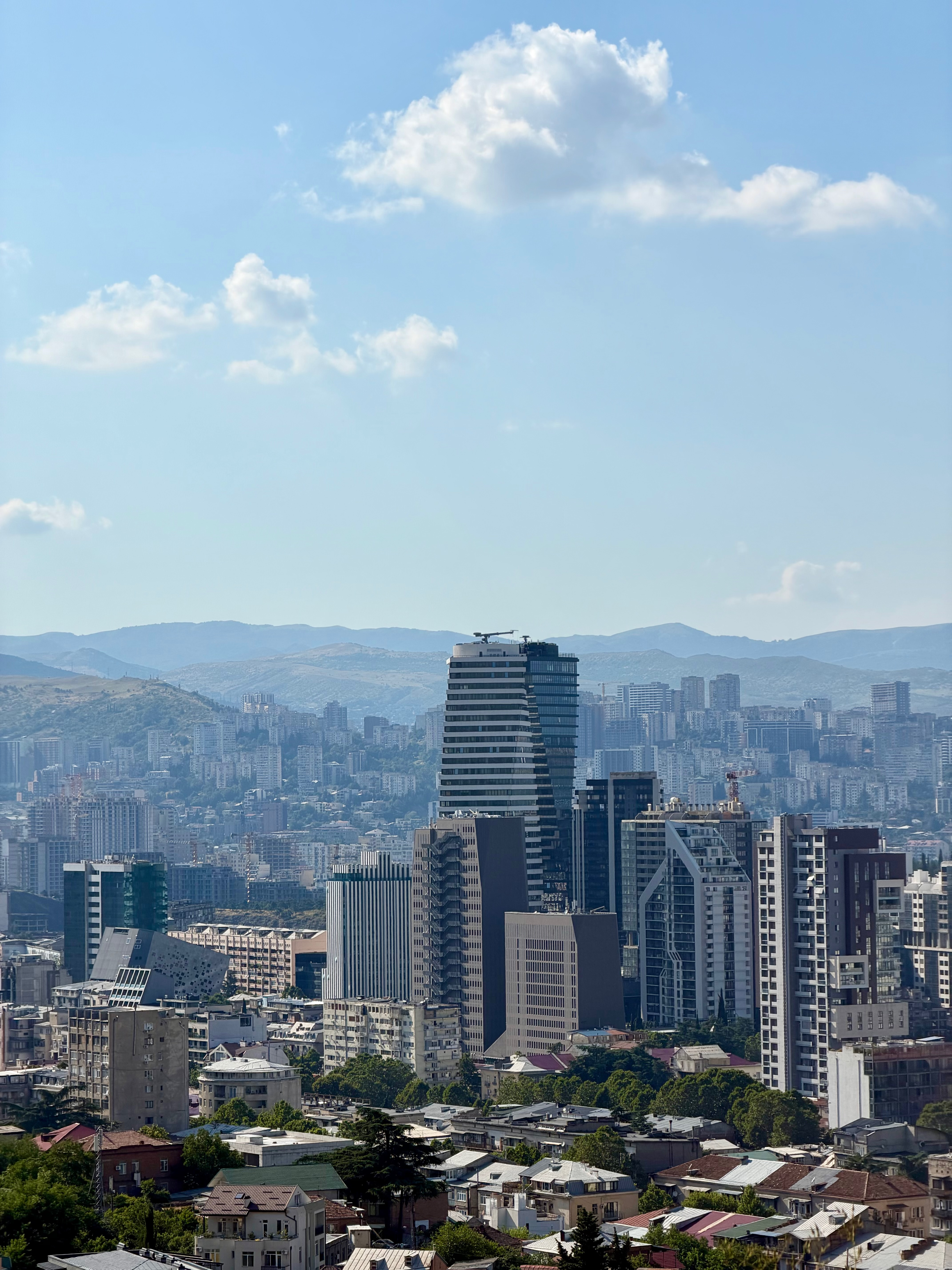
- Vake neighborhood as seen from a nearby hill. High-rise residential and office buildings can be seen along Ilia Chavchavadze Avenue
- Interactive map of Vake
- Country: Georgia
- City: Tbilisi
- District (Raioni): Vake District
- Part of Tbilisi since: 1906
- Demonym: Vakeli (Georgian: ვაკელი)
- Time zone: UTC+4 (Georgian Time)
- Postal code: 0179

Vake (Georgian: ვაკე [vɑkʼɛ]) is a neighborhood in the southwestern part of Tbilisi, Georgia, on the right bank of the river Mtkvari; it is part of Vake District.

The name originated in the 19th century, meaning a plain or flat place. Vake is a settlement that originated on the territory of Old Vera. By the beginning of the 20th century, its borders were: to the east Varaziskhevi, to the north – Vere River, south and southwest – mountain skirts. During this period, the development of Tskneti Street (now Petre Melikishvili Street) reached Varaziskhevi with a small bridge over it. In Tbilisi Development plan of 1906 only the Nobility Gymnasium building is mentioned in this area (currently 1st building of Tbilisi State University). Then Tbilisi Spiritual Seminary was built not far from the gymnasium (later on this building became agricultural institute, now it is one of the clinics of Tbilisi State Medical University [formerly the 9th Hospital]).

Since January 1906, Vake was incorporated into Tbilisi. Intensive construction began in the 1920s. For a long time, this neighborhood was connected to the center of Tbilisi only by Melikishvili Street. In 1957, as a result of reconstruction of the lower part of Varaziskhevi, it became connected to Heroes Square. In 1958, Vake-Saburtalo Connection Highway (currently Mikheil Tamarashvili Street) was also constructed.

The border starts from Heroes Square and goes up the axis of Varaziskhevi Street, crosses Ilia Chavchavadze Avenue, then passes along the axis of Kekelidze Street in Varazi gorge and follows the gorge to the head, where it turns right and goes in the north-west direction, crosswise. In the back (abundant) gorge gorge, on the left it leaves the Kaklebi summer settlement and from the Bagebi to the Kaklebi settlement it connects to the Tbilisi-Tskneti highway, follows this highway to the extreme north-west curve and connects directly to the Tbilisi administrative border, to the left.

Vere to the top of the northern watershed ridge, from where the border joins the Tbilisi-Napetvari road to University Street, then follows University Street to the intersection of Tamarashvili Street, from where the border runs along Tamarashvili Street in a south direction for 450 meters. Then the border turns east and follows the river. Vere watershed at a distance of 1300 meters, from where the border crosses the river. In the Vere riverbed and continues to the Heroes Square.

Currently, Vake is one of the largest residential areas of Tbilisi. There are also high schools, research centers, administrative institutions, etc. In 1946, Vake Park was opened (formerly Victory Park, Architect K. Dgebuadze, Dendrologist N. Tsitsishvili). In 1982, Children's park and recreation park Mziuri was opened.

== See also ==
- Vake Park
- Irakli Abashidze street
- Zakaria Paliashvili street

== Bibliography ==
- Georgian Soviet Encyclopedia V4, p. 274, Tbilisi, 1979.
- Kvirkvelia, T., Old Tbilisi Settlements, pp. 36–37, Tbilisi, 1985.
