= Timotesubani Monastery =

Monastery in Borjomi Gorge, Georgia

Coordinates: 41°48′38″N 43°31′06″E

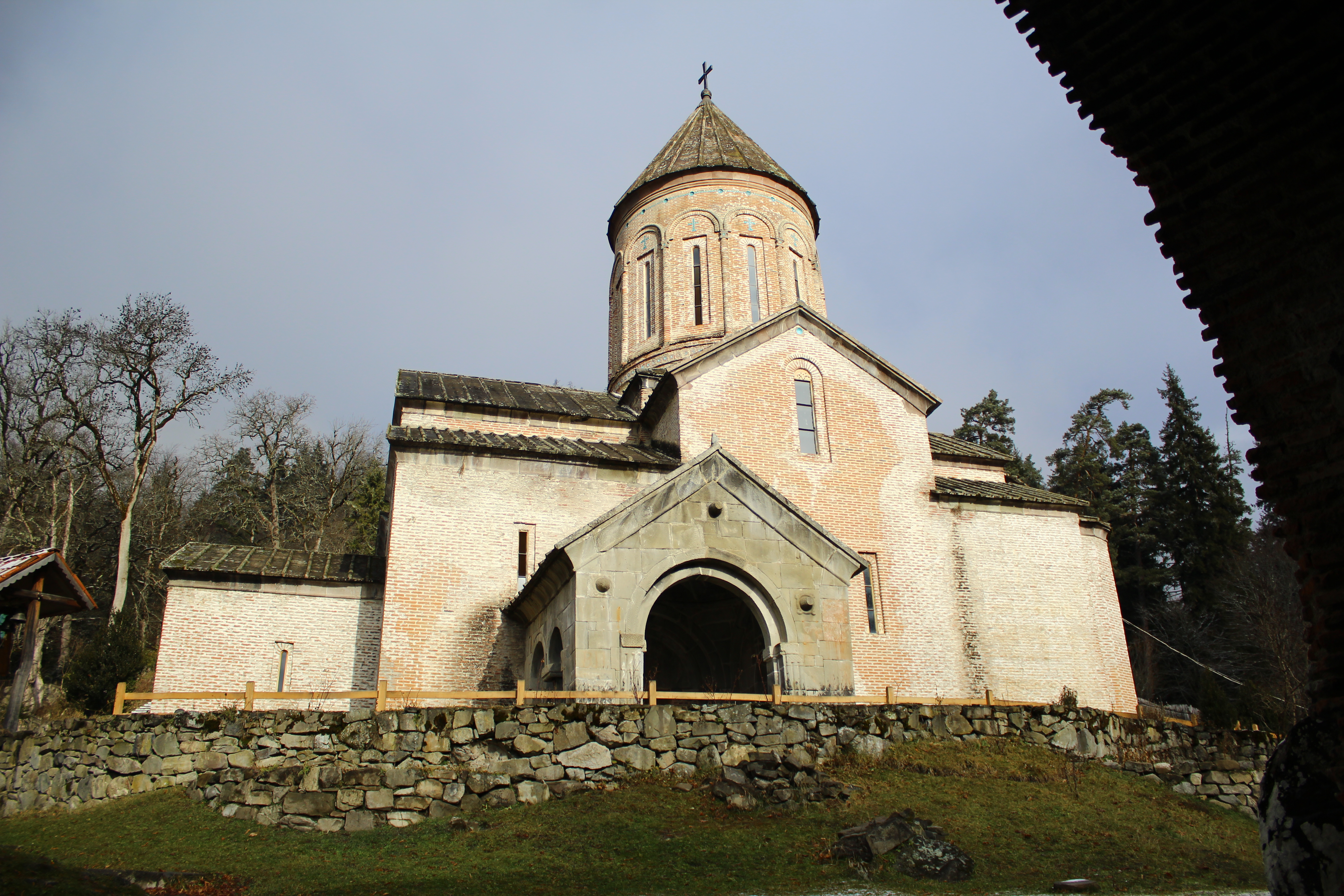
Timotesubani Church

Timotesubani (Georgian: ტიმოთესუბანი) is a medieval Georgian Orthodox Christian monastic complex located at the eponymous village in the Borjomi Gorge, Georgia's Samtskhe-Javakheti region.

The complex consists of a series of structures built between the 11th and 18th centuries, of which the Church of the Dormition is the largest and artistically most exquisite edifice constructed during the "Golden Age" of medieval Georgia under Queen Tamar (r. 1184–1213). A contemporary inscription commemorates the Georgian nobleman Shalva of Akhaltsikhe as a patron of the church.

The church is a domed cross-in-square design built of pink stone, with three apses projecting on the east. Its dome rests upon the two freely standing pillars and ledges of the altar. Later, two portals – the western and southern – were added.

The interior was extensively frescoed no later than the 1220s. The Timotesubani murals are noted for their vivacity and complexity of iconographic program. These frescoes were cleaned and studied by E. Privalova and colleagues in the 1970s and underwent emergency treatment and conservation with aid from the World Monuments Fund and the Samuel H. Kress Foundation in the 2000s.
