= Tsagveri =

Tsagveri წაღვერი
- Borough
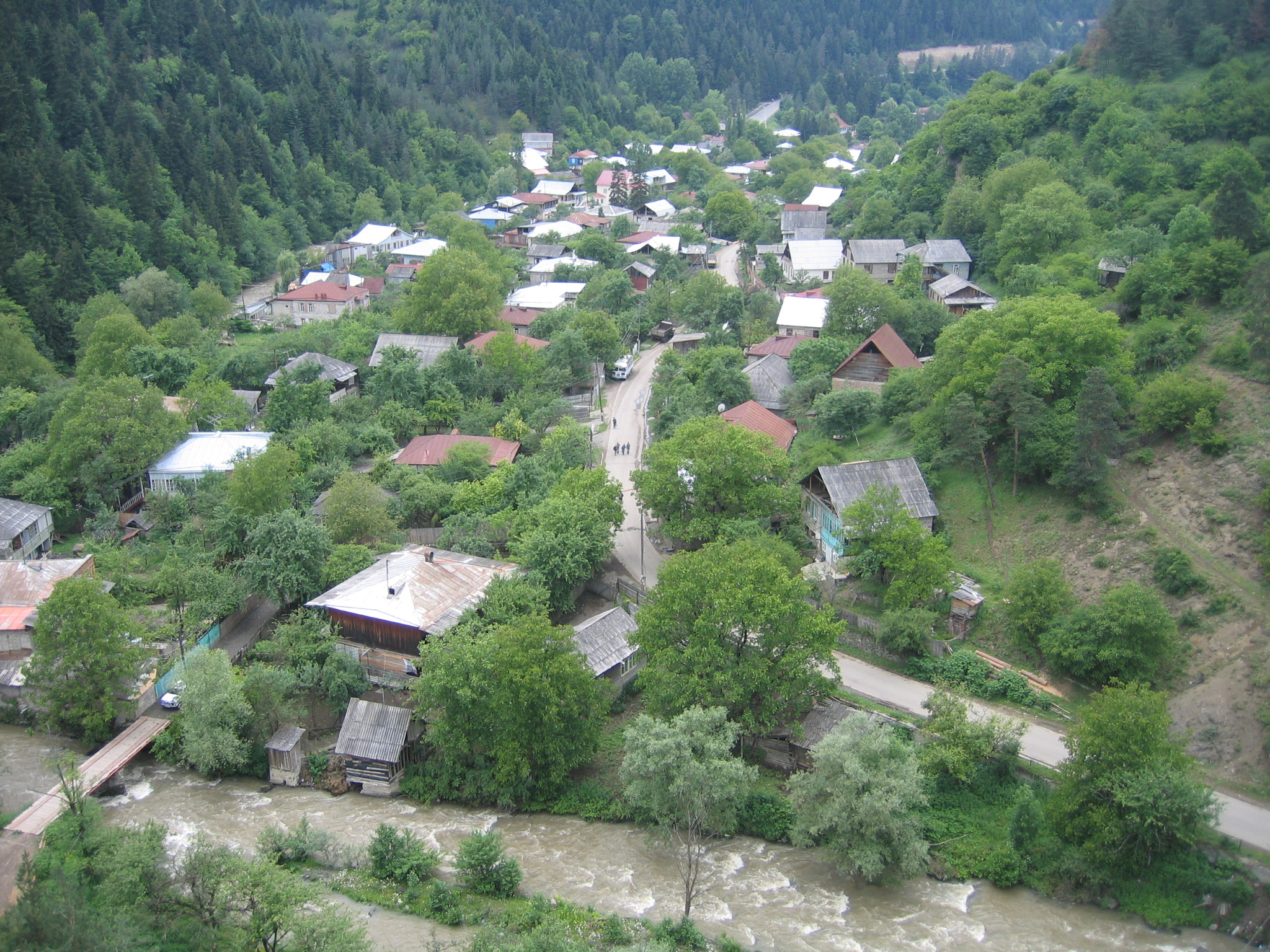

- Location within Georgia
- Coordinates: 41°47′56″N 43°29′03″E
- Country: Georgia
- Region: Samtskhe–Javakheti
- Municipality: Borjomi
- Elevation: 1,030 m (3,380 ft)

Population
  - Estimate (2014): 799
- Time zone: UTC+4 (Georgian Time)

Tsagveri (Georgian: წაღვერი) is a daba in Borjomi Municipality in the Samtskhe–Javakheti region of Georgia. The daba has a population of 799, as of 2014. Tsagveri is located on the northern slopes of the Trialeti Range, at 1020-1130 meters above sea level. It is a Balneological resort. The resort comprises moderately mild, snowy winters and moderately warm summers.
