= Vake District =

District in Tbilisi, Georgia

Vake District ვაკის რაიონი
- Tbilisi District
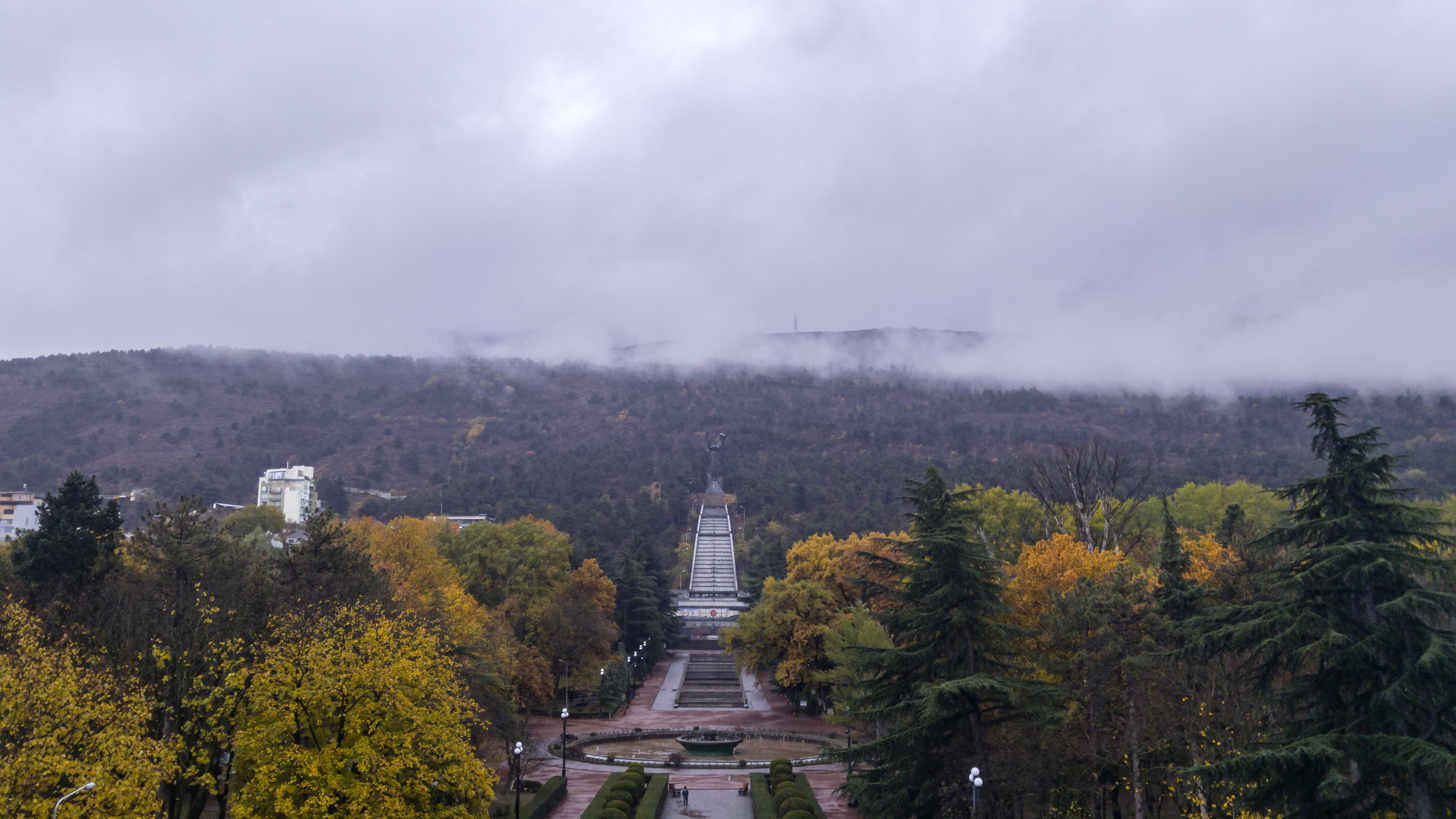
- Vake Park
- Etymology: Georgian: ვაკე (The Plain)
- Interactive map outlining Vake District
- Location within Tbilisi Location within Georgia
- Coordinates: 41°42′52″N 44°45′48″E
- Country: Georgia
- City: Tbilisi
- Administracion HQ: 10a, Tamarashvili Str, Tbilisi

Government
  - Body: Administration of district
  - Head of district: David Kvinikadze

Area
  - Total: 61.7 km^{2} (23.8 sq mi)

Population (2024)
  - Total: 302,826
- Time zone: UTC+4 (Georgian Time)
- Website: www.tbilisi.gov.ge

Vake is an administrative district (raioni) in Tbilisi, capital of Georgia.

Vake District includes neighborhoods: Vake, Bagebi, Upper Saburtalo, Nutsubidze Plateau, Tskneti, Tkhinvala, Agaraki, Akhaldaba, Betania, and Kveseti.
