= 2015 in Europe =

This is a list of 2015 events that occurred in Europe.

== Incumbents ==
=== Albania ===
(Albania)

=== Andorra ===
(Andorra)

=== Azerbaijan ===
(Azerbaijan)

=== Belarus ===
(Belarus)

=== Belgium ===
(Belgium)

=== Bosnia and Herzegovina ===
(Bosnia and Herzegovina)

=== Bulgaria ===
(Bulgaria)

=== Croatia ===
(Croatia)

=== Czech Republic ===
(Czech Republic)

=== Cyprus ===
(Cyprus)

=== Denmark ===
(Denmark)

=== Estonia ===
(Estonia)

=== European Union ===
- President of the European Commission: Jean-Claude Juncker
- President of the Parliament: Martin Schulz
- President of the European Council: Donald Tusk
- Presidency of the Council of the EU:
  - Latvia (January–July)
  - Luxembourg (July–December)

=== Finland ===
(Finland)

=== France ===
(France)

=== Germany ===
(Germany)

=== Georgia ===
(Georgia (country))

=== Greece ===
(Greece)

=== Hungary ===
(Hungary)

=== Iceland ===
(Iceland)

=== Ireland ===
(Republic of Ireland)

=== Italy ===
(Italy)

=== Latvia ===
(Latvia)

=== Liechtenstein ===
(Liechtenstein)

=== Lithuania ===
(Lithuania)

=== Luxembourg ===
(Luxembourg)

=== Malta ===
(Malta)

=== Moldova ===
(Moldova)

=== Monaco ===
(Monaco)

=== Montenegro ===
(Montenegro)

=== Netherlands ===
(Netherlands)

=== North Macedonia ===
(North Macedonia)

=== Norway ===
(Norway)

=== Poland ===
(Poland)

=== Portugal ===
(Portugal)

=== Romania ===
(Romania)

=== Russia ===
(Russia)

=== San Marino ===
(San Marino)

=== Serbia ===
(Serbia)

=== Slovakia ===
(Slovakia)

=== Slovenia ===
(Slovenia)

=== Spain ===
(Spain)

=== Sweden ===
(Sweden)

=== Switzerland ===
(Switzerland)

=== Turkey ===
(Turkey)

=== Ukraine ===
(Ukraine)

=== United Kingdom ===
(United Kingdom)

=== Vatican City ===
(Vatican City)

== Events ==
=== January ===
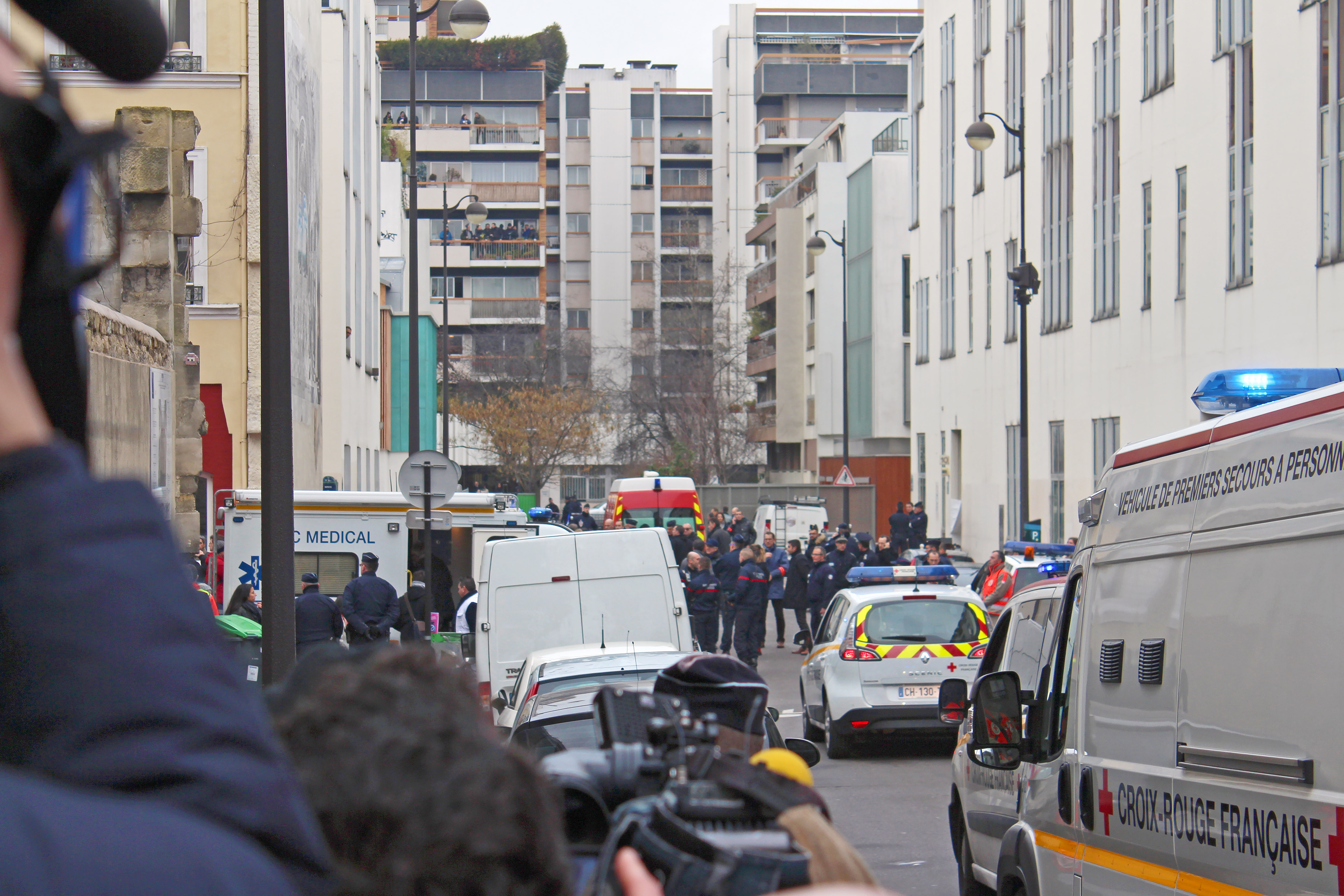
Journalists and law enforcers on Rue Nicolas-Appert, Paris, a few hours after the Charlie Hebdo shooting

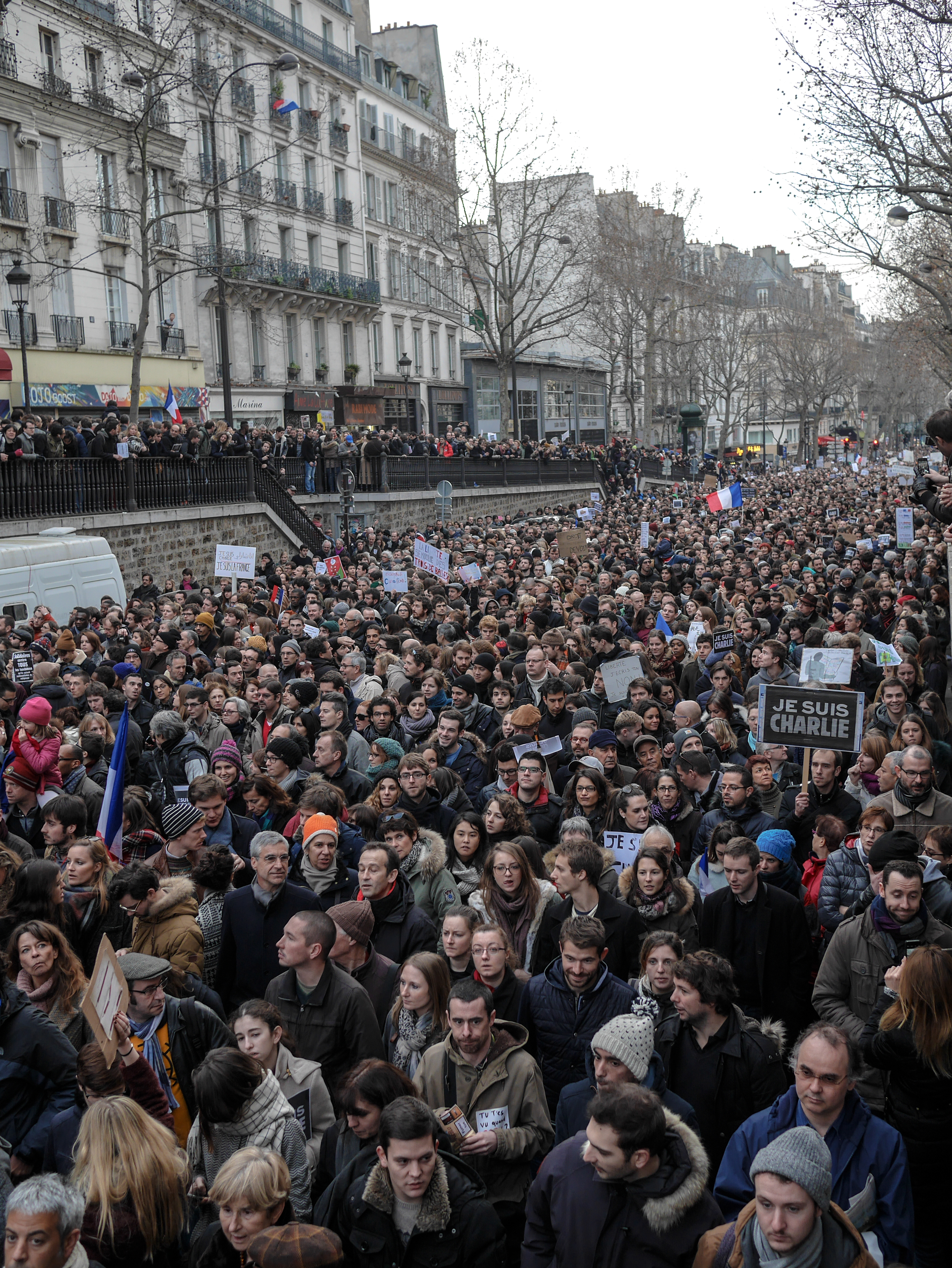
Republican March in Paris, on 11 January

- 1 January
  - Lithuania officially adopts the euro as its currency, replacing the litas, and becomes the 19th Eurozone country.
  - The Eurasian Economic Union between Russia, Kazakhstan, Belarus and Armenia comes into effect.
- 3 January – The Islamic-rooted government of Turkey authorizes the building of the first church in the country since 1923.
- 4 January – Eight people are presumed dead after the Cyprus-flagged cargo ship MV Cemfjord capsizes off the northern coast of Scotland.
- 7 January – Gunmen attack the Paris office of French satirical magazine Charlie Hebdo, killing 12 people and injuring eleven.
- 9 January – A member of the Islamic State attacks a Hypercacher kosher supermarket at Porte de Vincennes, Paris, killing four people and taking several hostages.
- 11 January
  - More than 3.7 million people, among them 60 heads of states and governments, march in France to condemn recent terrorist attacks in Paris.
  - Kolinda Grabar-Kitarović becomes the first female President of Croatia.
- 13 January – A shell hits a bus in eastern Ukraine, killing 12 civilians and wounding 18 more.
- 14 January – Giorgio Napolitano, the longest-serving President of Italy, resigns due to age.
- 15 January – Swiss National Bank abandons the cap on the franc's value relative to euro, causing a turmoil in international financial markets.
- January – The Hungarian town Mayor of Ásotthalom László Toroczkai calls for a Hungarian border barrier in the south of the country, to deal with the growing 2015 migrant crisis.
- 24 January – At least 29 civilians are killed and 102 injured in a mortar attack on Mariupol, Ukraine.
- 25 January – The Coalition of the Radical Left wins a plurality of seats in the Greek legislative election and forms a coalition government with the Independent Greeks.
- 26 January – An F-16 jet belonging to the Hellenic Air Force crashes at Los Llanos Air Base, Spain, during a NATO exercise, killing ten people and injuring 21.
- 27 January – 92 policemen are injured and 180 protesters arrested as anti-government demonstrations in Pristina turn violent.
- 31 January – Italy's parliament elects constitutional court judge Sergio Mattarella as the country's president.

=== February ===
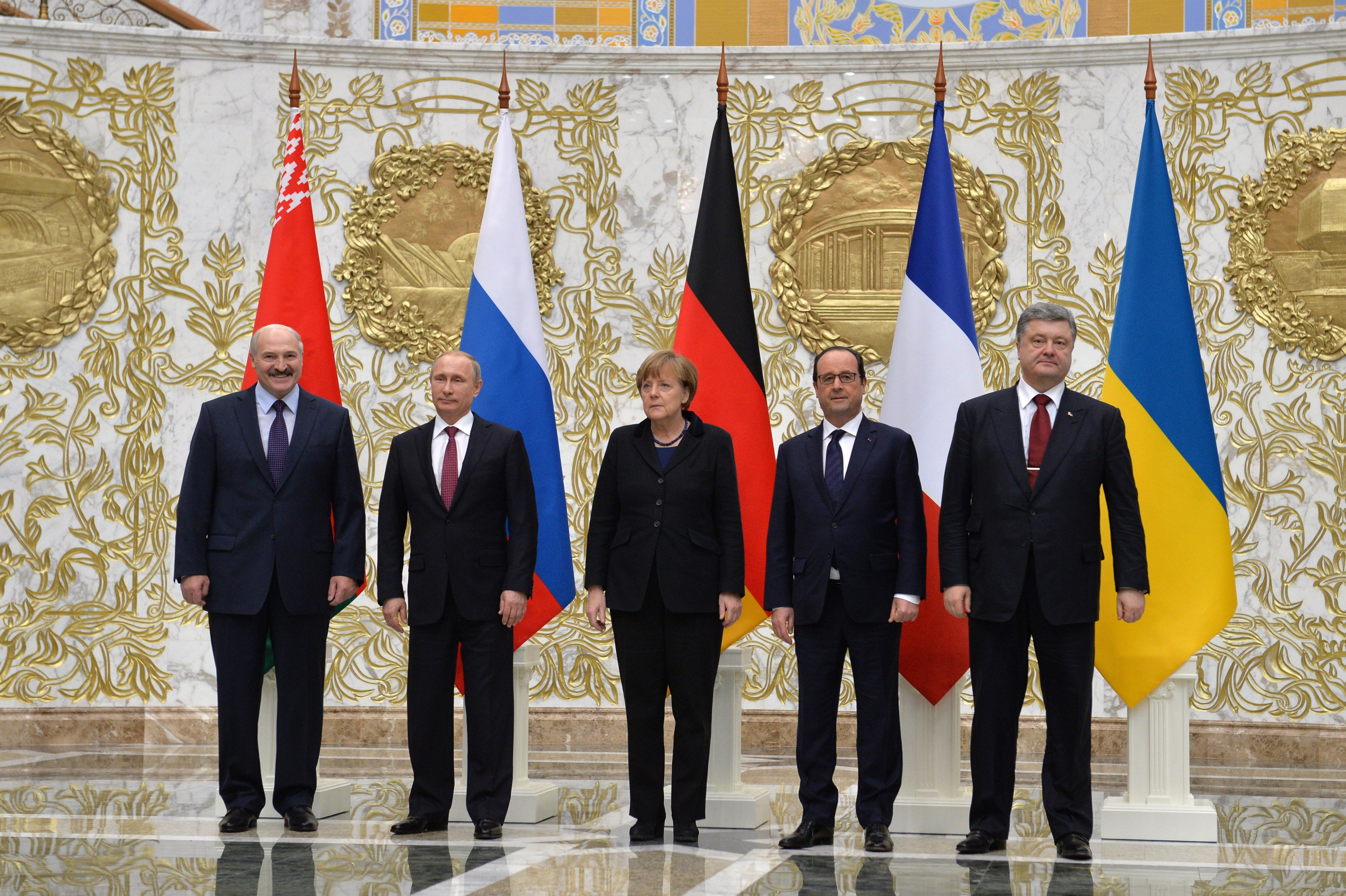
Alexander Lukashenko, Vladimir Putin, Angela Merkel, François Hollande and Petro Poroshenko taking part in the talks on a settlement to the War in Donbas

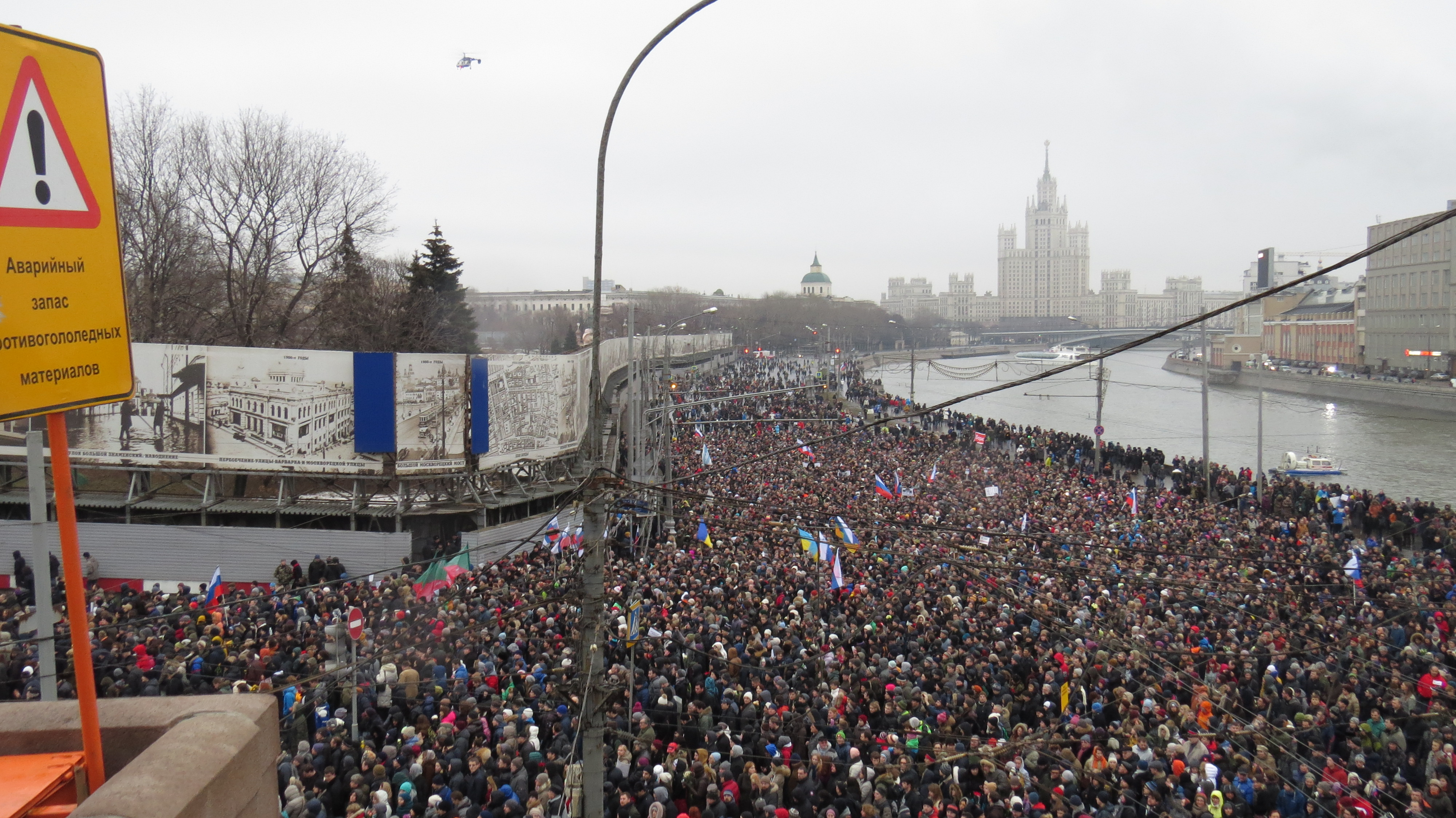
March in memory of Boris Nemtsov in Moscow, 1 March

- 12 February – The leaders of Russia, Ukraine, France and Germany reach a ceasefire deal after 17 hours of talks in Minsk, Belarus, on the War in Donbas.
- 14 February – Two people are killed in shootings at a free-speech seminar and at a synagogue service in Copenhagen.
- 18 February – Conservative Prokopis Pavlopoulos is elected President of Greece.
- 22 February – Two people are killed and 11 injured in an explosion at a peace rally in Kharkiv, Ukraine.
- 24 February – A Czech gunman opens fire at a restaurant in Uherský Brod, killing eight people.
- 27 February – Russian opposition politician Boris Nemtsov is assassinated in Moscow. The murder of former deputy PM is condemned by world leaders and sparks protests in Russia.

=== March ===
- 1 March – The Estonian Reform Party, led by Prime Minister Taavi Rõivas, wins the country's parliamentary election.
- 4 March – 33 people are killed and 14 injured following an explosion at Zasyadko coal mine in Donetsk Oblast, Ukraine.
- 12 March
  - Iceland formally withdraws its candidacy to the European Union, filed in 2009 and frozen since 2013. The move is met with protests from civil society.
  - 30 people are feared dead and 40 more injured after a shopping center in Kazan collapses in a fire.
- 20 March – A solar eclipse is visible across much of Europe, with totality over the Faroe Islands and Svalbard.
- 24 March – Germanwings Flight 9525 crashes in the French Alps, killing all 150 people on board.

=== April ===
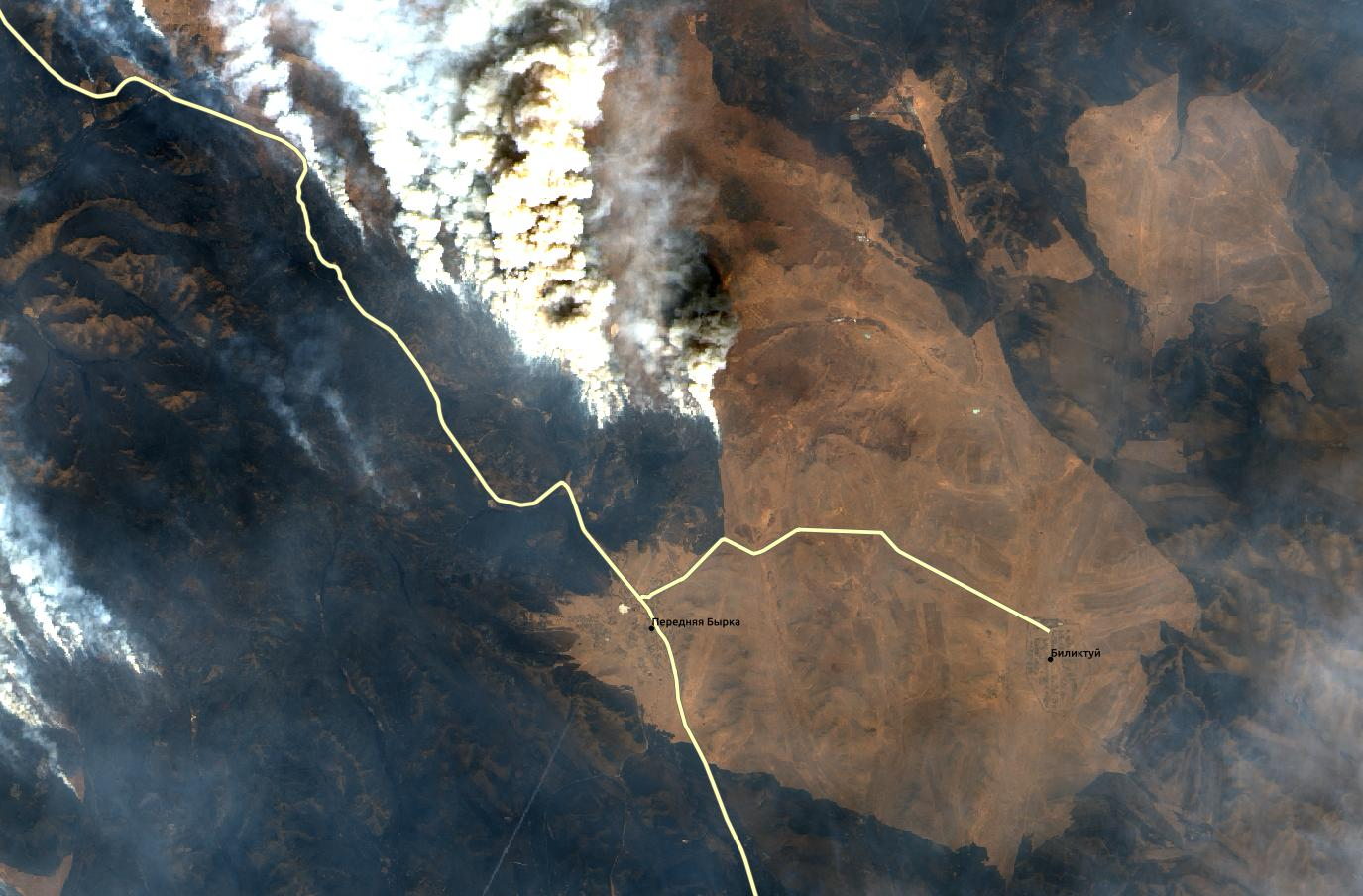
Satellite view of wildfires in Russia's Zabaykalsky Krai

- 1 April – The Russian-flagged fishing trawler Dalniy Vostok sinks off the Kamchatka Peninsula, with 57 confirmed dead and 12 missing.
- 12–14 April – A series of wildfires in Southern Siberia kill 29 people and leave thousands homeless.
- 14 April – Up to 400 illegal migrants from Libya drown after their boat capsizes in the Mediterranean Sea.
- 19 April – As many as 700 people are feared dead after a boat carrying migrants capsizes in the Mediterranean Sea.
- 24 April – 14 migrants believed to be from Afghanistan and Somalia are hit by a train and killed while walking along railway tracks in Macedonia.

=== May ===
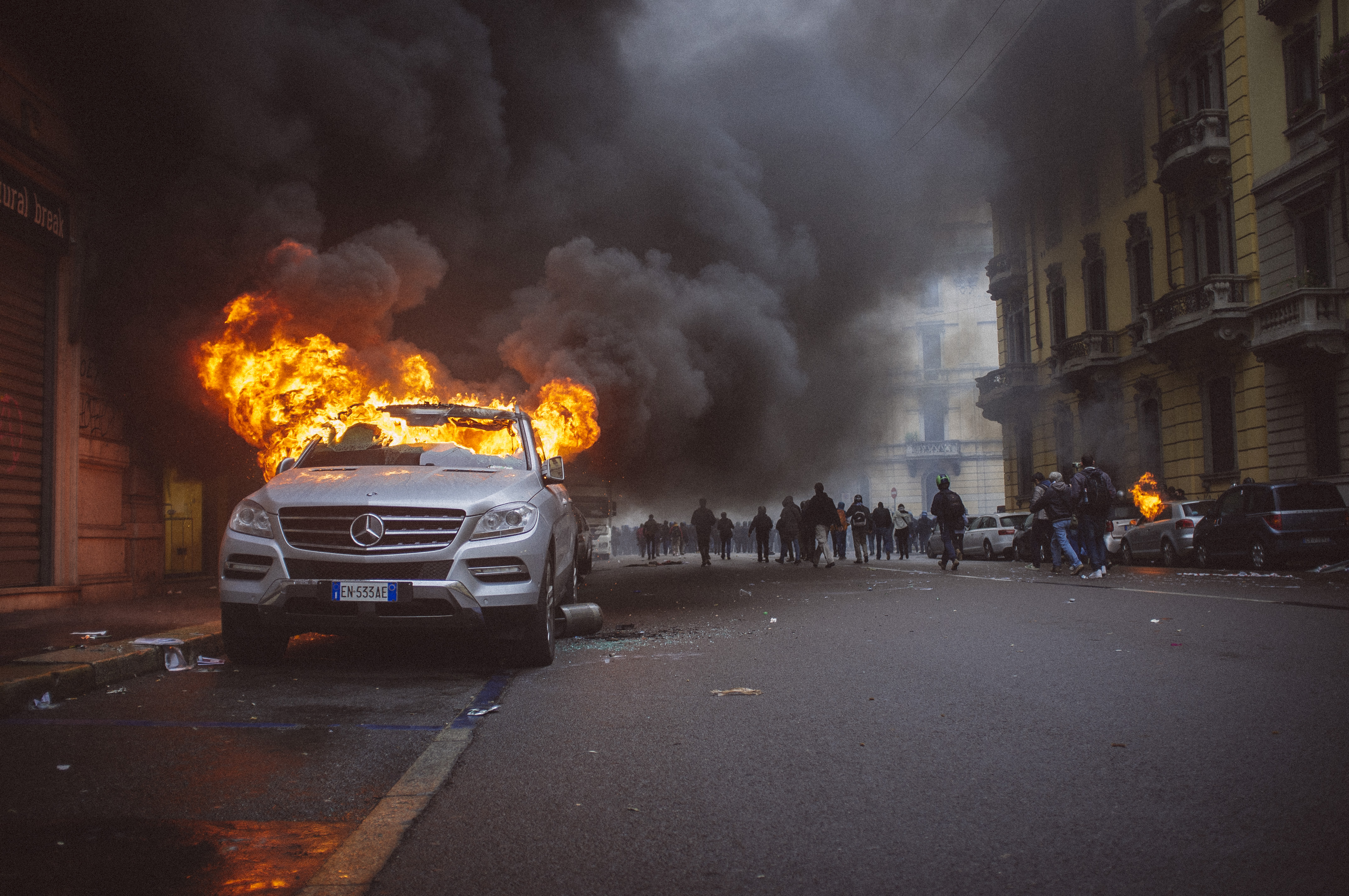
Riots in Milan after Expo 2015 opening ceremony

- 1 May – Expo 2015 opens in Milan, with 145 countries participating. Widespread rioting occurs in Milan as students protesting overspending clash with police.
- 5 May – 38 police officers and one protester are injured in Skopje in opposition-organized protests against conservative Prime Minister Nikola Gruevski's government.
- 7 May – The UK's Conservative Party, led by David Cameron, wins a majority of seats in the House of Commons.
- 10 May – Eight police officers and 14 alleged members of an armed group are killed in fighting in Kumanovo, Macedonia.
- 22 May – Ireland becomes the first country in the world to legalise same-sex marriage by constitutional referendum.
- 23 May – Sweden's Måns Zelmerlöw wins the 60th annual Eurovision Song Contest with electro-pop ballad "Heroes".
- 24 May – Opposition candidate Andrzej Duda is elected President of Poland.
- 27 May – Two separate criminal probes result in the arrest of seven FIFA officials and the raid of its headquarters by Swiss police.

=== June ===
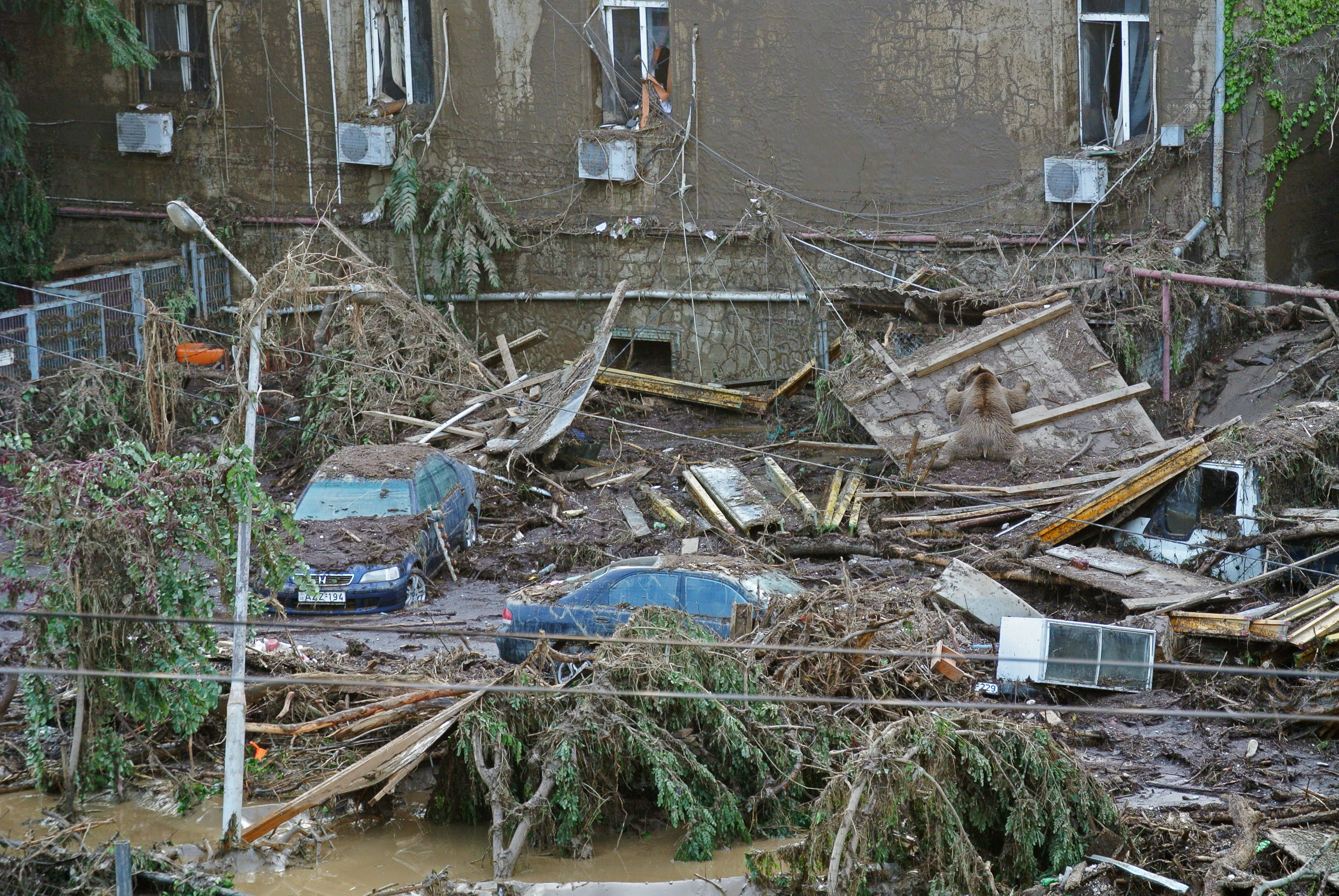
Tbilisi Zoo after the flood

- 5 June – Two people are killed and over 100 wounded in explosions at a rally by the pro-Kurdish People's Democratic Party in Diyarbakır.
- 7–8 June – The 41st G7 summit is held in Schloss Elmau, Bavaria.
- 14 June – Flooding in the Georgian capital, Tbilisi, kills at least 19 people and releases zoo animals into the streets.
- June – the Hungarian cabinet approves construction of a 4 metres (13 ft) high barrier to stop migrants.
- 18 June – The centre-right opposition bloc led by Venstre wins the Danish general election, even though the Social Democratic party remains Denmark's largest.
- 20 June – Three people are killed and 43 injured as a man drives his SUV into a crowd in Graz, Austria.
- 24 June – 25 people are injured and at least 240 arrested in clashes between protesters and law enforcers over proposed electricity price increase in Armenian capital, Yerevan.
- 26 June – A man is decapitated and 12 others injured as a follower of the Islamic State group attacks an Air Products factory in Saint-Quentin-Fallavier.

=== July ===
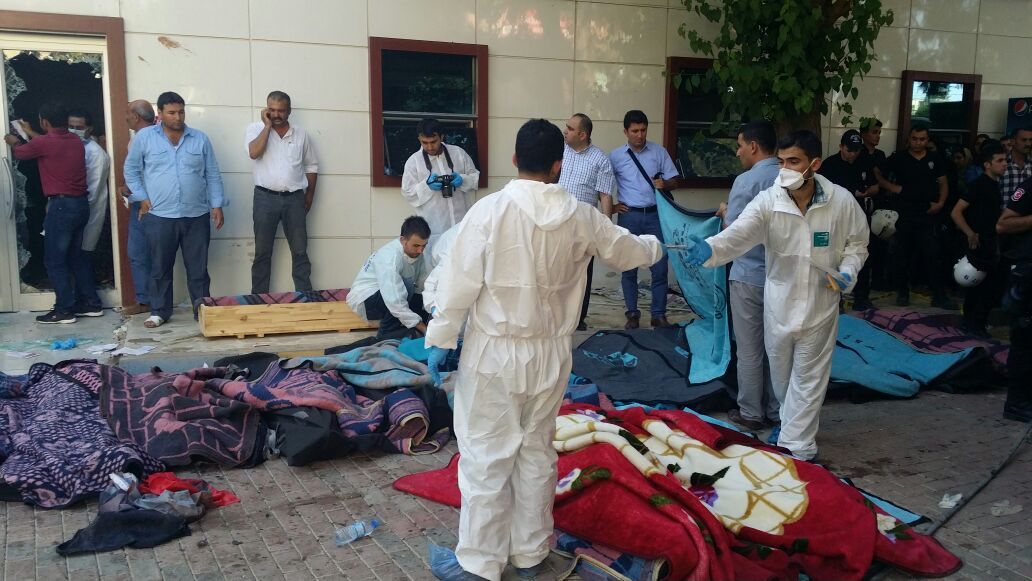
Aftermath of the Suruç bombing

- 1 July – Greece becomes the first advanced economy to miss a payment to the International Monetary Fund.
- 13 July – At least three people die and 13 others are injured in skirmish in the western Ukrainian town of Mukachevo.
- 20 July – A suicide attack targeting activists in the Turkish town of Suruç kills at least 30 people and injures 100 more.
- 22 July – A high-speed train collides with a truck in the eastern Czech Republic, leaving three passengers dead and 17 injured.
- 24 July – An explosion at a fireworks factory in Modugno, Italy, kills at least seven people.

=== August ===
- 5 August – Some 400 migrants are rescued and 25 bodies recovered after a fishing boat carrying an estimated 600 capsizes in the Mediterranean Sea.
- 19 August – EU finance ministers formally approve the first tranche of a new €86 billion bailout for Greece after parliaments in member states back the move.
- 20 August
  - Two planes carrying dozens of parachutists collide mid-air over western Slovakia, killing seven people. 31 others on board survive by jumping out with their parachutes.
  - Greek Prime Minister Alexis Tsipras submits his resignation and calls for early elections.
  - Macedonia declares a state of emergency on its southern and northern borders over a surge in migrants and refugees.
- 22 August – Eleven people are killed when a Hawker Hunter crashes onto a busy road during an airshow in Shoreham-by-Sea, United Kingdom.
- 27 August – Up to 71 refugees are found dead in the back of a freezer truck in eastern Austria.
- August 31 - German Chancellor Angela Merkel makes her we can do this statement during the 2015 European migrant crisis.

=== September ===
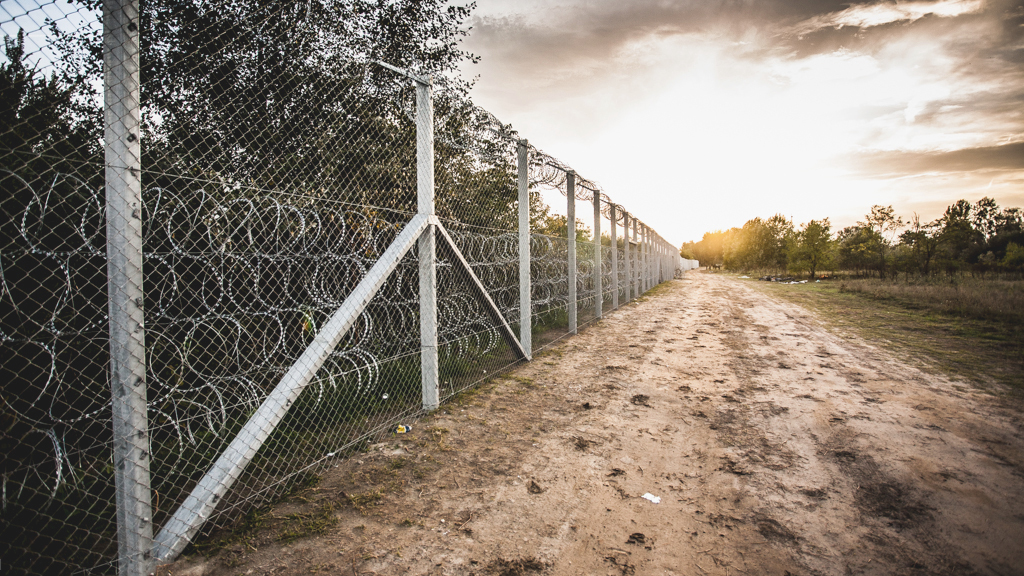
Hungary Serbia border barrier

National governments' position on 22 September 2015 European Union Justice and Home Affairs Council majority vote to relocate 120,000 refugees from Greece and Italy to other EU countries according to proportional quotas: Yes Opt-out Abstention No Non-EU state *Malta not seen/marked on map

- September – Hungary builds the Hungarian border barrier fence on its border with Serbia and Croatia.
- 9 September – Queen Elizabeth II becomes the longest-reigning British head of state, surpassing the reign of her great-great-grandmother, Queen Victoria.
- 13 September – At least 34 migrants drown in the Aegean Sea off the coasts of Farmakonissi trying to reach Europe.
- 15 September – The Hungarian government declares a state of emergency to cope with the influx of refugees, as almost 10,000 people are detained for illegally crossing the border from Serbia.
- 23 September – Volkswagen CEO Martin Winterkorn resigns after company officials admit widespread rigging of diesel emissions test results.

=== October ===
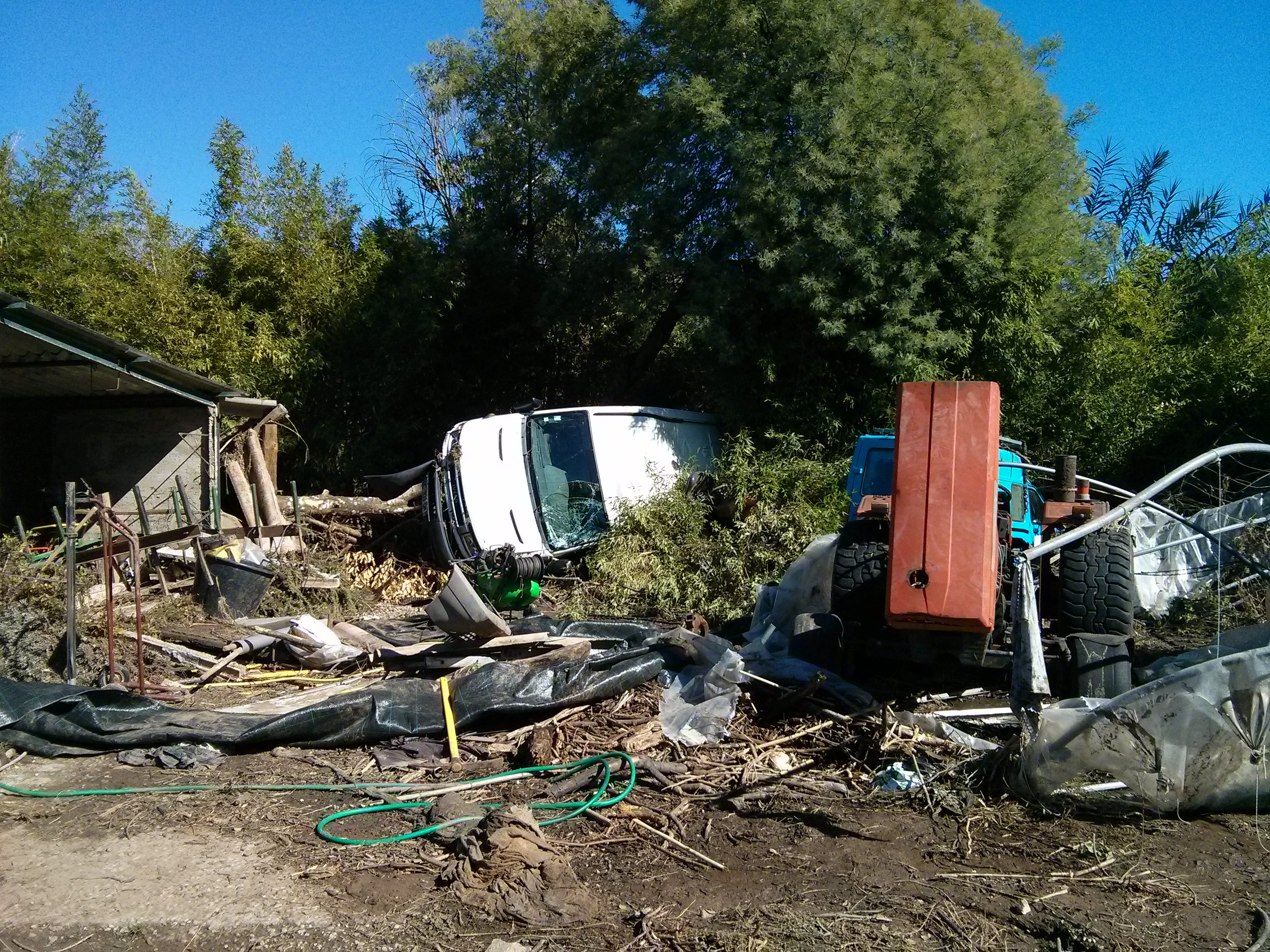
Aftermath of Alpes-Maritimes flash floods

- 4 October
  - Violent storms and flooding hit south-eastern France, killing at least 20 people with two more missing.
  - Portugal's governing centre-right coalition wins the country's general election, which has been widely seen as a referendum on four years of austerity.
- 10 October
  - At least 97 people are killed and more than 400 others injured in twin bombings at a peace rally in Ankara, Turkey.
  - 250,000 people protest in Berlin against the Transatlantic Trade and Investment Partnership accord between the European Union and the United States.
- 11 October – Alexander Lukashenko is re-elected President of Belarus for a fifth term.
- 22 October – A masked man armed with a sword kills a teacher and a student in an attack at a school in Trollhättan, Sweden, before police fatally shoot him.
- 23 October – At least 43 people are killed in a head-on collision between a bus and a truck near the French town of Puisseguin.
- 30 October – A fire at a nightclub in downtown Bucharest kills 59 people and injures 152 more.

=== November ===
- 4 November – Romanian Prime Minister Victor Ponta and his government resign after mass protests over Colectiv nightclub fire.
- 13 November – Following a World Anti-Doping Agency investigation, the IAAF suspends Russia from all international competition in the sport of athletics.
- 13/14 November – At least 130 people are killed in a series of coordinated terrorist attacks in Paris.
- 21 November – Nearly 2 million people on the Crimean Peninsula are without electricity after two transmission towers in Ukraine were damaged by explosions.
- 24 November – Tensions rise between Russia and Turkey, after a Russian Su-24 warplane is shot down by a Turkish Air Force F-16 near the border between Turkey and Syria.

=== December ===
- 30 December-Poland's new conservative government by the Law and Justice Party (PiS) proposed a media bill that would allow it to control public service broadcasters TVP and Polish Radio via a national media council close to the government. This was condemned by the European Federation of Journalists (EFJ), European Broadcasting Union (EBU) and Reporters Without Borders (RSF).

== Births ==
- 2 May – Princess Charlotte

== Deaths ==
=== January ===
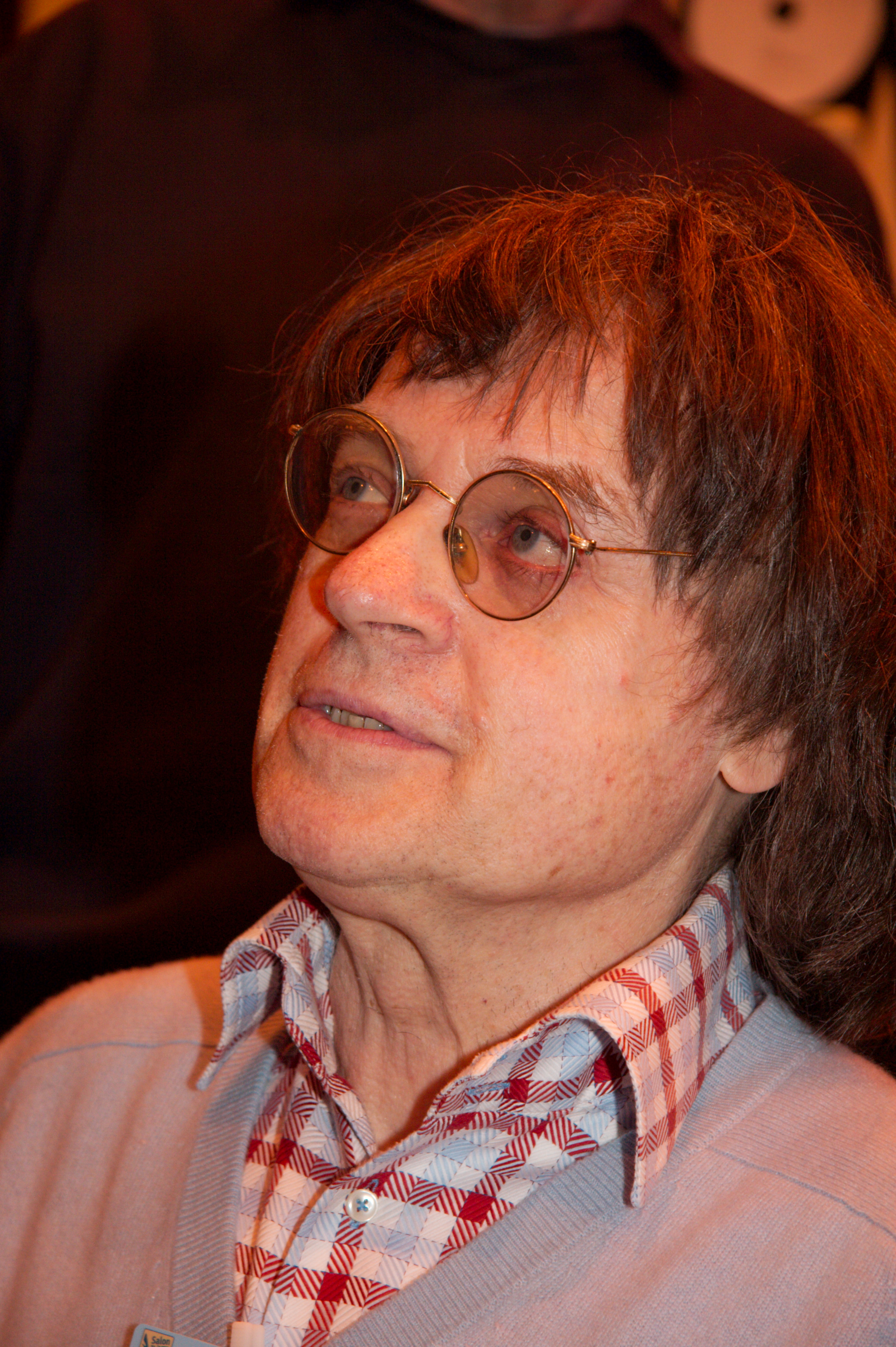
Cabu

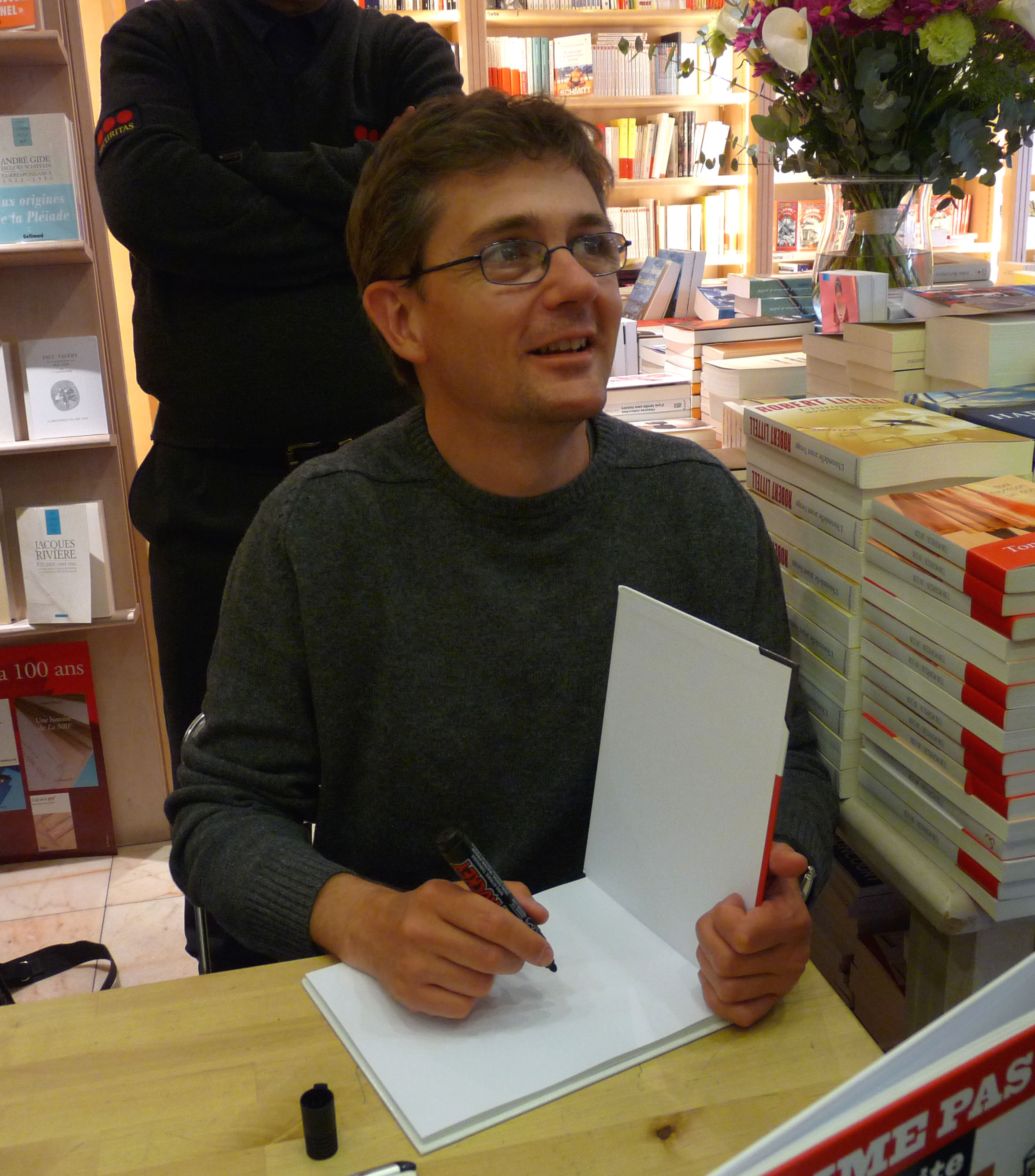
Charb

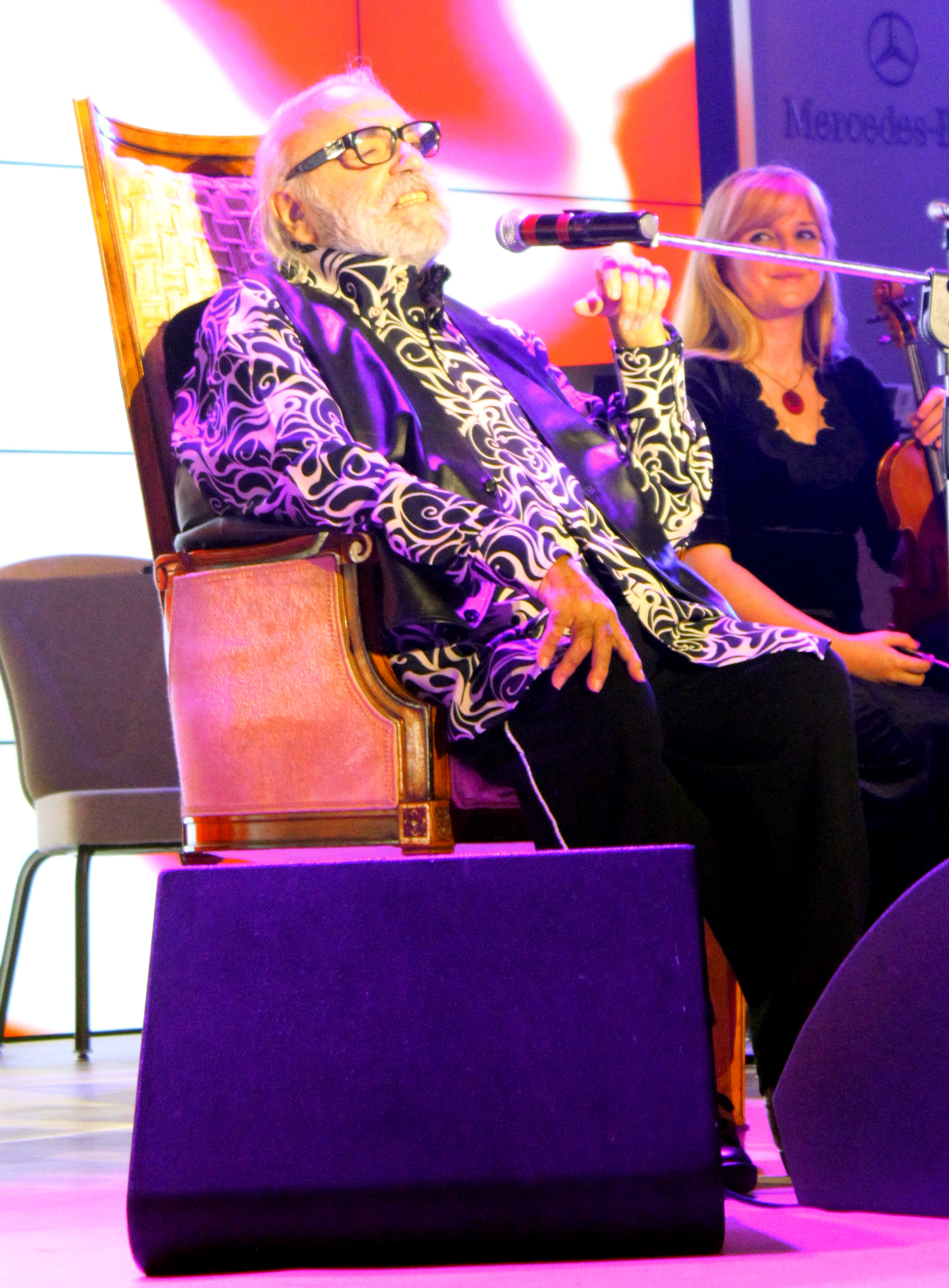
Demis Roussos

- 1 January
  - Ulrich Beck, German sociologist (b. 1944)
  - Boris Morukov, Russian astronaut (b. 1950)
- 4 January – Pino Daniele, Italian singer-songwriter and guitarist (b. 1955)
- 5 January – Jean-Pierre Beltoise, French racing driver (b. 1937)
- 6 January – Vlastimil Bubník, Czech ice hockey player and footballer (b. 1931)
- 7 January
  - Tadeusz Konwicki, Polish writer and film director (b. 1926)
  - Cabu, French comic strip artist and caricaturist (b. 1938)
  - Charb, French satirical caricaturist and journalist (b. 1967)
  - Tignous, French cartoonist (b. 1957)
  - Georges Wolinski, French Jewish cartoonist and comics writer (b. 1934)
- 9 January – Józef Oleksy, 7th Prime Minister of Poland (b. 1946)
- 10 January – Francesco Rosi, Italian film director (b. 1922)
- 11 January
  - Anita Ekberg, Swedish actress and model (b. 1931)
  - Jenő Buzánszky, Hungarian football player and coach (b. 1925)
- 12 January – Elena Obraztsova, Russian opera singer (b. 1939)
- 20 January – Edgar Froese, German musician (b. 1944)
- 21 January – Leon Brittan, British politician and barrister (b. 1939)
- 24 January – Otto Carius, German WWII tank commander (b. 1922)
- 25 January – Demis Roussos, Greek singer (b. 1946)
- 28 January – Yves Chauvin, French Nobel chemist (b. 1930)
- 30 January
  - Geraldine McEwan, English actress (b. 1932)
  - Zhelyu Zhelev, 2nd President of Bulgaria (b. 1935)
- 31 January – Richard von Weizsäcker, President of Germany (1984–94) (b. 1920)

=== February ===
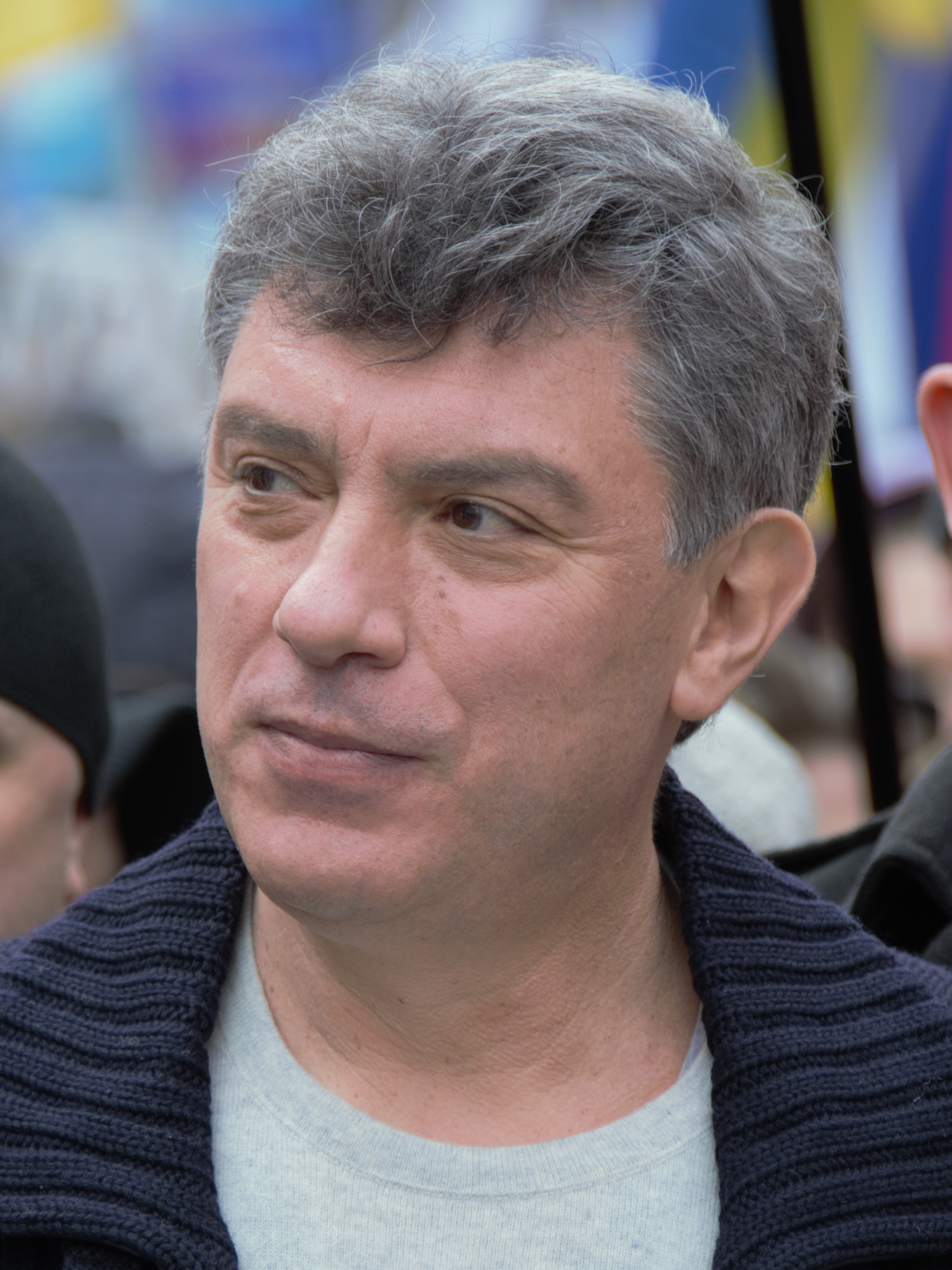
Boris Nemtsov

- 1 February
  - Aldo Ciccolini, Italian-French pianist (b. 1925)
  - Udo Lattek, German football player, coach and TV pundit (b. 1935)
- 3 February – Martin Gilbert, English historian (b. 1936)
- 5 February – Henri Coppens, Belgian footballer (b. 1930)
- 10 February – Karl Josef Becker, German cardinal (b. 1928)
- 14 February
  - Michele Ferrero, Italian entrepreneur (b. 1925)
  - Louis Jourdan, French film and television actor (b. 1921)
  - Franjo Mihalić, Croatian-Serbian runner and coach (b. 1920)
  - Wim Ruska, Dutch wrestler and martial artist (b. 1940)
- 18 February – Claude Criquielion, Belgian road bicycle racer (b. 1958)
- 21 February – Aleksei Gubarev, Russian cosmonaut (b. 1931)
- 27 February – Boris Nemtsov, Russian politician (b. 1959)

=== March ===
- 1 March – Wolfram Wuttke, German footballer (b. 1961)
- 2 March – Dave Mackay, Scottish football player and manager (b. 1934)
- 9 March
  - Camille Muffat, French swimmer (b. 1989)
  - Alexis Vastine, French boxer (b. 1986)
  - Frei Otto, German architect (b. 1925)
- 11 March – Walter Burkert, German academician and author (b. 1931)
- 12 March – Terry Pratchett, English author (b. 1948)
- 15 March – Valentin Rasputin, Russian writer (b. 1937)
- 16 March – Andy Fraser, English songwriter and bass guitarist (b. 1952)
- 19 March – Gerda van der Kade-Koudijs, Dutch athlete (b. 1923)
- 21 March
  - Hans Erni, Swiss graphic designer, painter, illustrator, engraver and sculptor (b. 1909)
  - Jørgen Ingmann, Danish jazz and pop guitarist (b. 1925)
- 26 March – Tomas Tranströmer, Swedish Nobel poet, psychologist and translator (b. 1931)
- 29 March – Miroslav Ondříček, Czech cinematographer (b. 1934)
- 30 March – Ingrid van Houten-Groeneveld, Dutch astronomer (b. 1921)

=== April ===
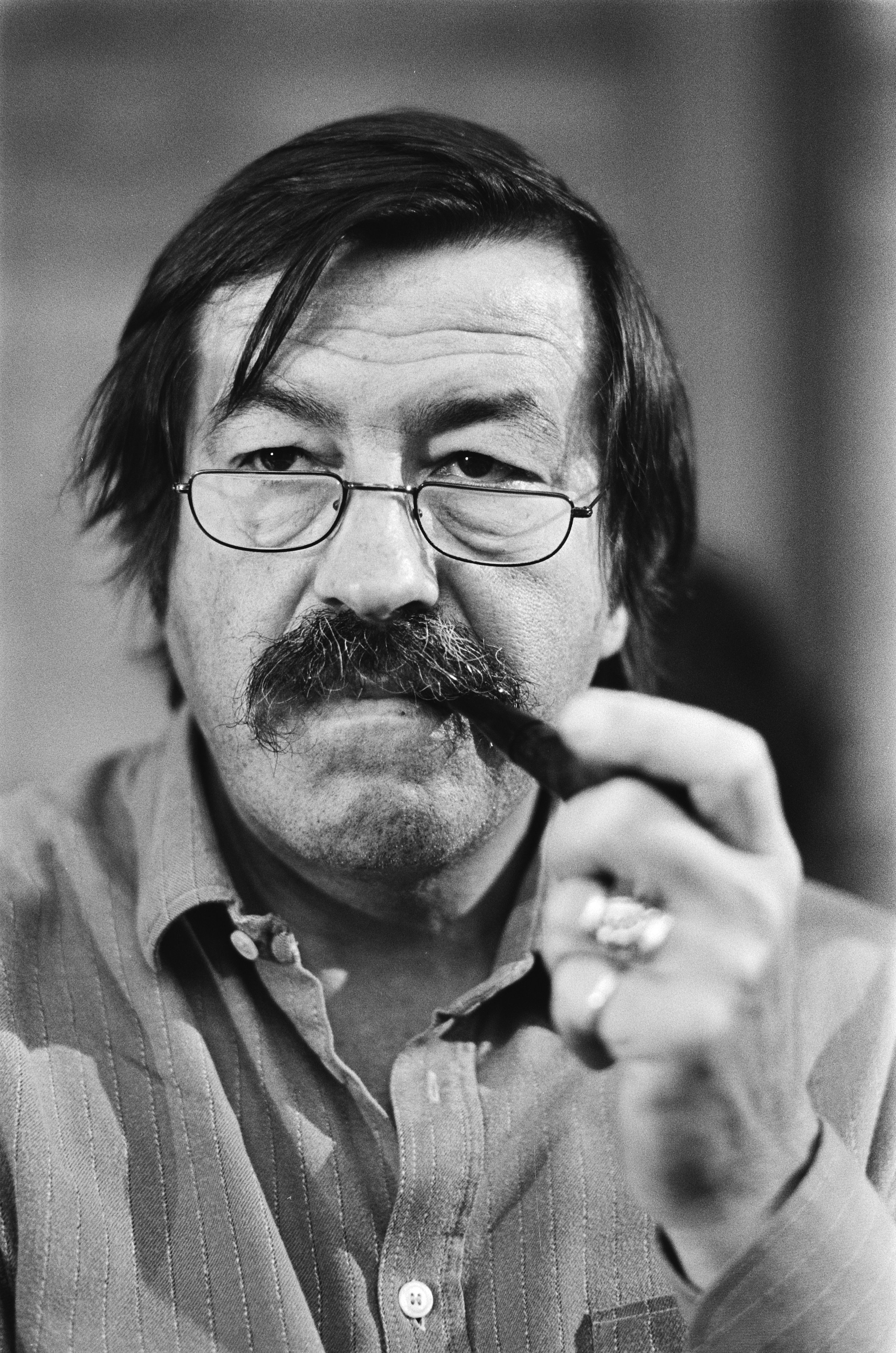
Günter Grass

- 1 April – Cynthia Lennon, former wife of John Lennon (b. 1939)
- 2 April – Manoel de Oliveira, Portuguese film director and screenwriter (b. 1908)
- 4 April – Klaus Rifbjerg, Danish writer (b. 1931)
- 13 April – Günter Grass, German Nobel writer (b. 1927)
- 14 April – Roberto Tucci, Roman Catholic cardinal and theologian (b. 1921)
- 16 April – Stanislav Gross, 5th Prime Minister of the Czech Republic (b. 1969)
- 24 April – Władysław Bartoszewski, Polish politician and resistance fighter (b. 1922)
- 29 April – Giovanni Canestri, Italian Catholic cardinal (b. 1918)
- 30 April – Patachou, French singer and actress (b. 1918)

=== May ===
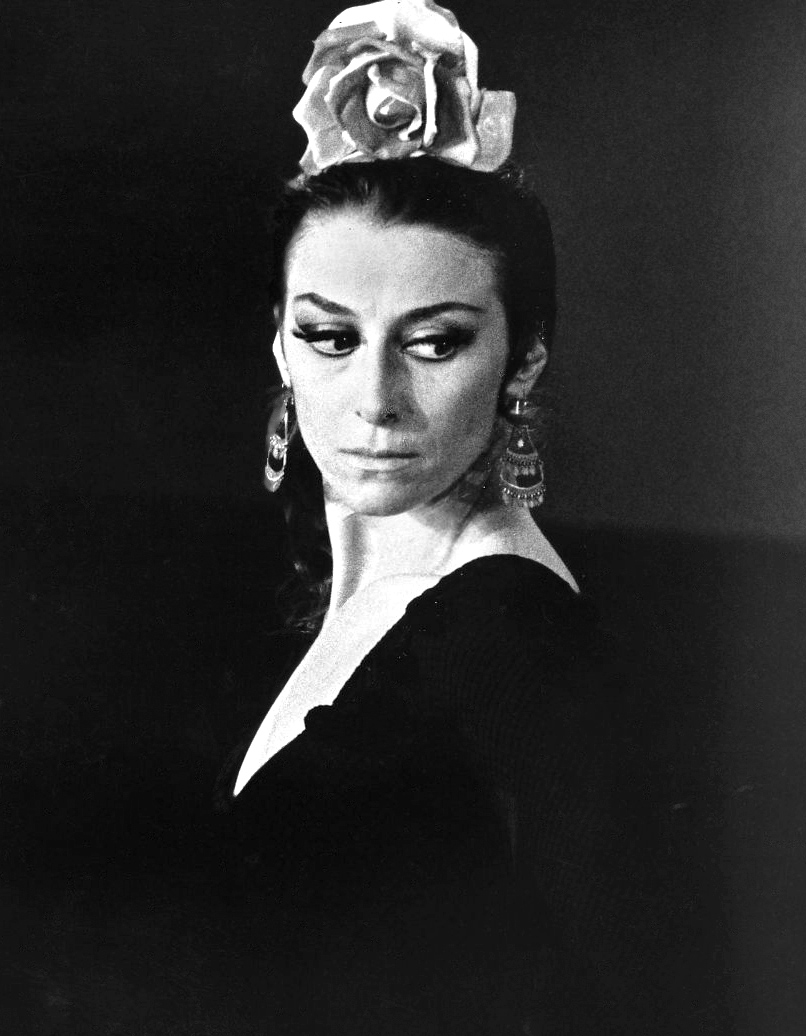
Maya Plisetskaya

- 1 May – Geoff Duke, British motorcycle racer (b. 1923)
- 2 May
  - Ruth Rendell, English author (b. 1930)
  - Maya Plisetskaya, Russian ballerina, choreographer and actress (b. 1925)
- 9 May – Kenan Evren, 7th President of Turkey (b. 1917)
- 15 May – Renzo Zorzi, Italian racing driver (b. 1946)
- 18 May
  - Halldór Ásgrímsson, Prime Minister of Iceland (b. 1947)
  - Raymond Gosling, British scientist (b. 1926)
- 21 May – Annarita Sidoti, Italian race walker (b. 1970)
- 24 May – Tanith Lee, British writer (b. 1947)
- 26 May – Vicente Aranda, Spanish film director, screenwriter and producer (b. 1926)
- 27 May – Nils Christie, Norwegian sociologist and criminologist (b. 1928)

=== June ===
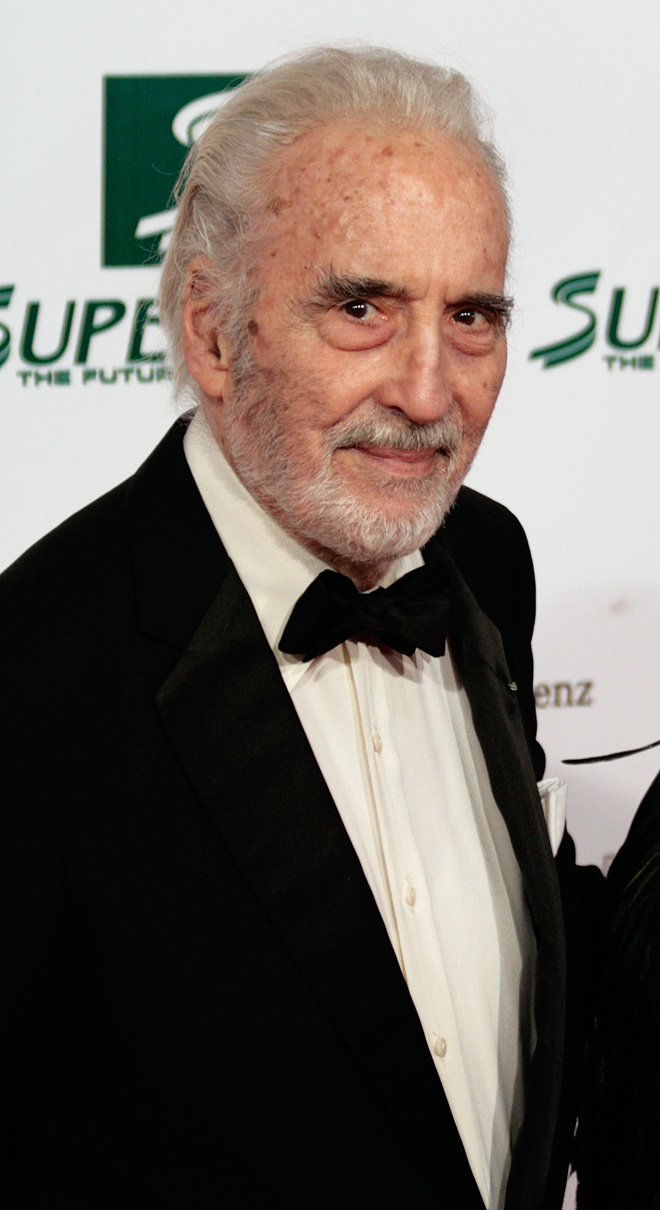
Christopher Lee

- 1 June – Charles Kennedy, British politician (b. 1959)
- 4 June – Hermann Zapf, German typeface designer and calligrapher (b. 1918)
- 6 June – Pierre Brice, French actor (b. 1929)
- 7 June – Christopher Lee, English actor, singer and author (b. 1922)
- 9 June – James Last, German composer and big band leader (b. 1929)
- 11 June – Ron Moody, British actor (b. 1924)
- 15 June – Jeanna Friske, Russian actress, singer, model and socialite (b. 1974)
- 17 June – Süleyman Demirel, 9th President of Turkey (b. 1924)
- 23 June – Magali Noël, French actress and singer (b. 1931)
- 25 June
  - Nerses Bedros XIX Tarmouni, patriarch of the Armenian Catholic Church (b. 1940)
  - Patrick Macnee, English actor (b. 1922)
- 26 June – Yevgeny Primakov, Prime Minister of Russia (1998–99) (b. 1929)
- 28 June – Chris Squire, English musician, singer and songwriter (b. 1948)
- 29 June
  - Josef Masopust, Czech football player and coach (b. 1931)
  - Charles Pasqua, French businessman and Gaullist politician (b. 1927)

=== July ===
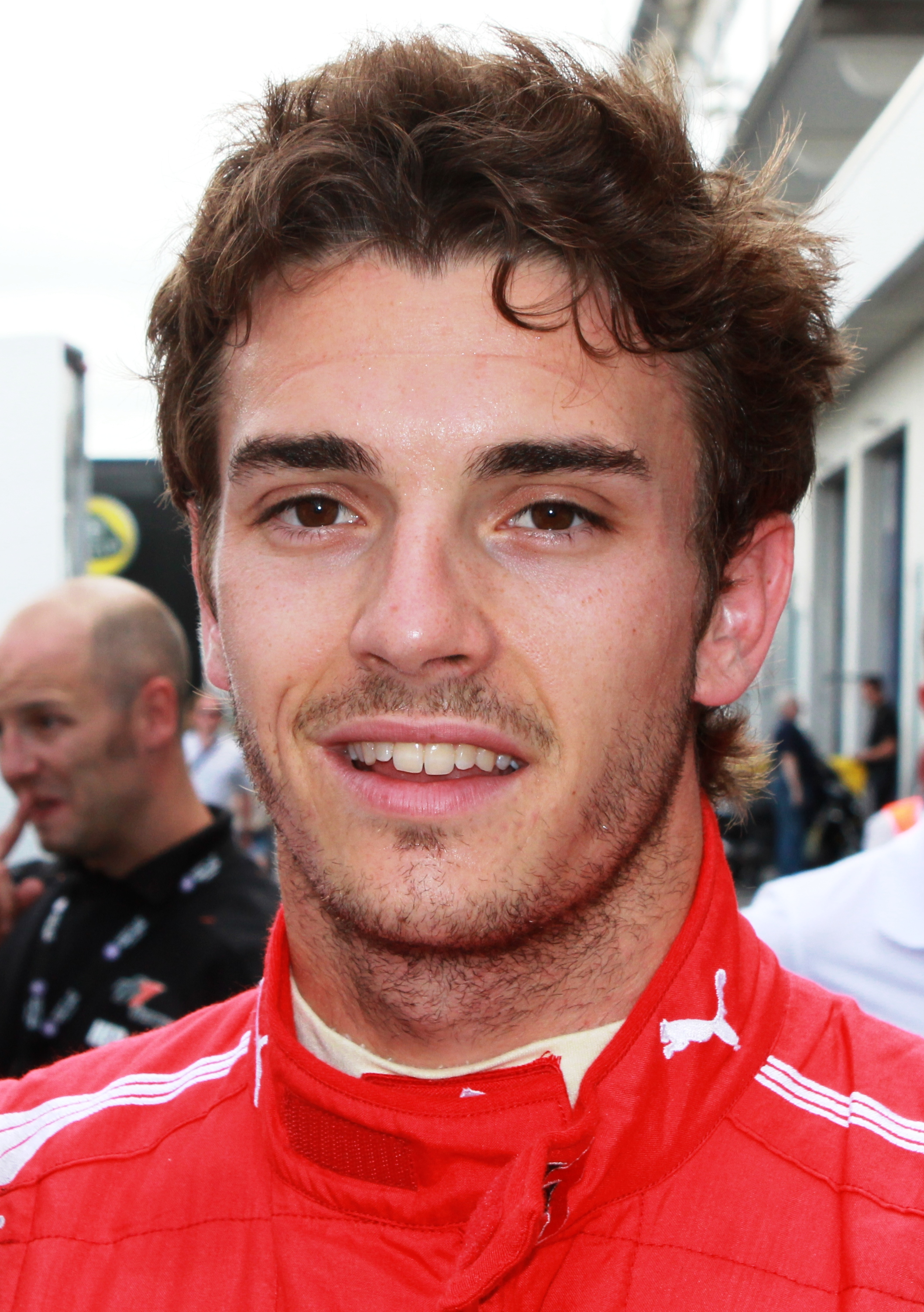
Jules Bianchi

- 1 July
  - Sergio Sollima, Italian film director and screenwriter (b. 1921)
  - Nicholas Winton, British-born Jewish humanitarian (b. 1909)
- 10 July – Roger Rees, Welsh actor and director (b. 1944)
- 13 July – Martin Litchfield West, British classical scholar (b. 1937)
- 14 July – Ildikó Schwarczenberger, Hungarian fencer (b. 1951)
- 17 July − Jules Bianchi, French motor racing driver (b. 1989)
- 21 July
  - Galina Prozumenshchikova, Soviet swimmer (b. 1948)
  - Theodore Bikel, Austrian-American Jewish actor, folk singer, musician, composer and activist (b. 1924)
- 30 July – Alena Vrzáňová, Czech figure skater (b. 1931)

=== August ===
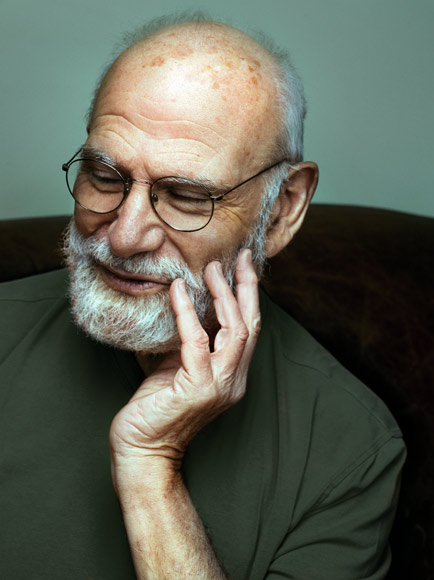
Oliver Sacks

- 1 August – Cilla Black, English singer, television presenter and actress (b. 1943)
- 3 August – Robert Conquest, British-American historian and poet (b. 1917)
- 11 August – Harald Nielsen, Danish footballer (b. 1941)
- 12 August – Jaakko Hintikka, Finnish philosopher and logician (b. 1929)
- 16 August – Mile Mrkšić, Serbian military officer (b. 1947)
- 17 August
  - Arsen Dedić, Croatian singer-songwriter (b. 1938)
  - László Paskai, Hungarian cardinal of the Roman Catholic Church (b. 1927)
- 20 August – Egon Bahr, German politician (b. 1922)
- 23 August – Guy Ligier, French rugby player and racing driver (b. 1930)
- 24 August – Justin Wilson, British racing driver (b. 1978)
- 30 August – Oliver Sacks, British neurologist and author (b. 1933)

=== September ===
- 12 September
  - Adrian Frutiger, Swiss typeface designer (b. 1928)
  - Ron Springett, British football goalkeeper (b. 1935)
- 14 September – Corneliu Vadim Tudor, Romanian poet, politician and journalist (b. 1949)
- 17 September – Dettmar Cramer, German football player and coach (b. 1925)
- 19 September – Jackie Collins, English romance novelist (b. 1937)
- 23 September – Dragan Holcer, Croatian football defender (b. 1945)
- 27 September
  - John Guillermin, British film director, writer and producer (b. 1925)
  - Pietro Ingrao, Italian politician, journalist and former partisan (b. 1915)
- 28 September – Ignacio Zoco, Spanish footballer (b. 1939)

=== October ===
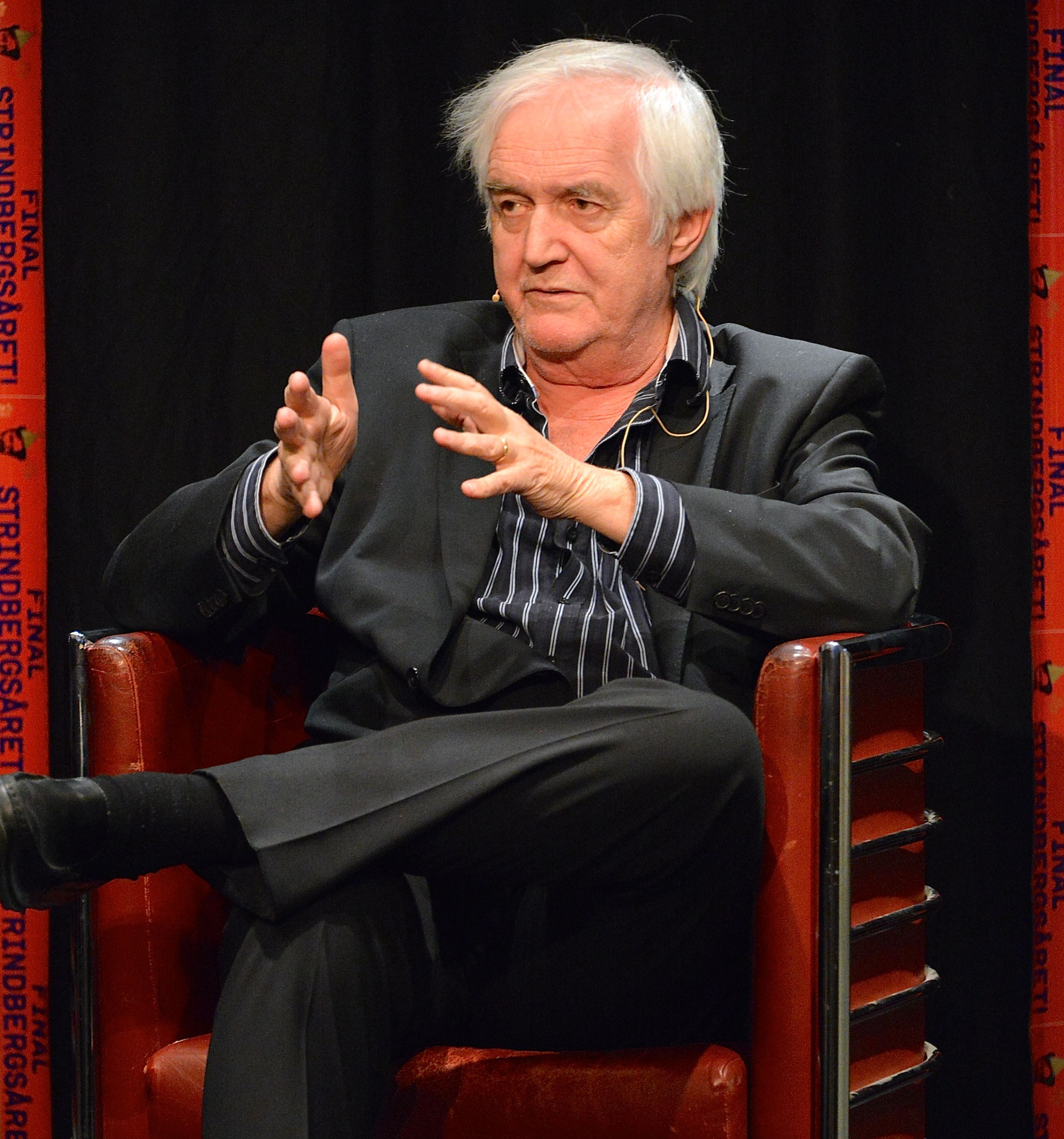
Henning Mankell

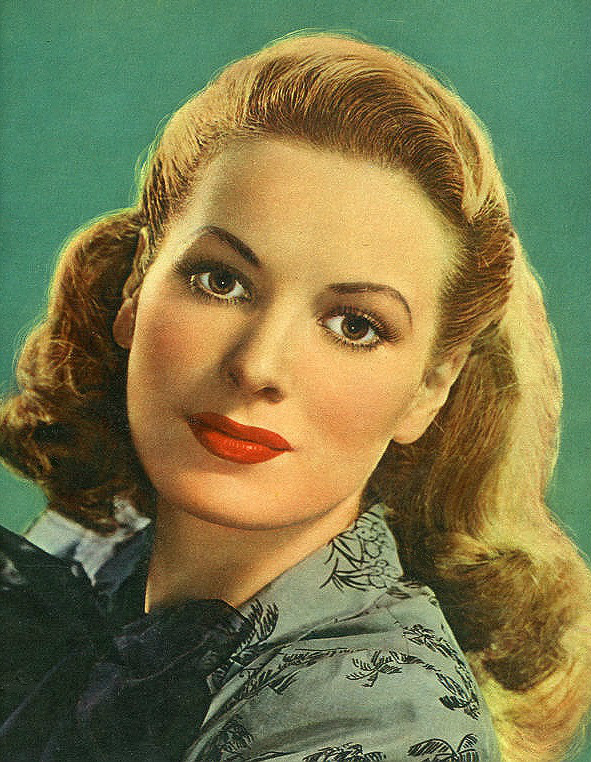
Maureen O'Hara

- 2 October – Brian Friel, Irish playwright and short story writer (b. 1929)
- 3 October – Denis Healey, British politician (b. 1917)
- 5 October
  - Chantal Akerman, Belgian film director, artist and professor of film (b. 1950)
  - Infante Carlos, Duke of Calabria (b. 1938)
  - Henning Mankell, Swedish crime writer, children's author and dramatist (b. 1948)
- 6 October – Árpád Göncz, former President of Hungary (b. 1922)
- 7 October – Dominique Dropsy, French footballer (b. 1951)
- 9 October – Geoffrey Howe, British politician (b. 1926)
- 17 October
  - Danièle Delorme, French actress and film producer (b. 1926)
  - Howard Kendall, English footballer and manager (b. 1946)
- 23 October – Paride Tumburus, Italian footballer (b. 1939)
- 24 October
  - Ján Chryzostom Korec, Slovak Jesuit priest and Cardinal of the Roman Catholic Church (b. 1924)
  - Maureen O'Hara, Irish-American actress and singer (b. 1920)
- 30 October – Sinan Şamil Sam, Turkish professional boxer (b. 1974)
- 31 October – Ants Antson, Estonian speed skater (b. 1938)

=== November ===
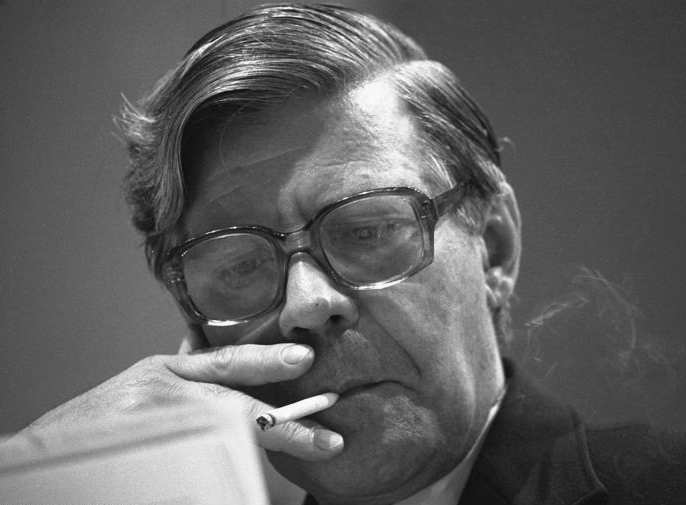
Helmut Schmidt

- 1 November – Günter Schabowski, German politician (b. 1929)
- 4 November – René Girard, French historian, literary critic and philosopher (b. 1923)
- 5 November
  - Nora Brockstedt, Norwegian singer (b. 1923)
  - Czesław Kiszczak, Polish soldier and politician (b. 1925)
- 7 November – Gunnar Hansen, Icelandic-born American actor and author (b. 1947)
- 8 November – Andrei Eshpai, Mari composer (b. 1925)
- 9 November
  - Ernst Fuchs, Austrian artist (b. 1930)
  - Andy White, Scottish drummer (b. 1930)
- 10 November
  - André Glucksmann, French philosopher, activist and writer (b. 1937)
  - Klaus Roth, German-born British mathematician (b. 1925)
  - Helmut Schmidt, Chancellor of West Germany (1974–1982) (b. 1918)
- 11 November – Phil Taylor, English rock drummer (b. 1954)
- 12 November – Márton Fülöp, Hungarian professional footballer (b. 1983)
- 21 November – Linda Haglund, Swedish Olympic sprinter (b. 1956)
- 28 November
  - Gerry Byrne, English footballer (b. 1938)
  - Barbro Hiort af Ornäs, Swedish actress (b. 1921)

== See also ==
- 2015 in the European Union
- List of state leaders in 2015 § Europe
