= Vere (river) =

River in eastern Georgia

- Native name: ვერე (Georgian)

Location
- Country: Georgia

Physical characteristics
- Source
  - location: Trialeti Range
- Mouth: Mtkvari
  - location: Tbilisi
  - coordinates: 41.7116°N 44.7893°E
- Length: 45 km (28 mi)
- Basin size: 194 km^{2} (75 sq mi)
- Discharge
  - average: 0.97 m^{3}/s (34 cu ft/s)

Basin features
- Progression: Kura→ Caspian Sea

The Vere (Georgian: ვერე) is a river in eastern Georgia, originating in the eastern slopes of the Trialeti Range, near Mount Didgori, and flowing into the Mtkvari (Kura) as its right tributary in Tbilisi, the capital of Georgia. The Vere river valley from Tbilisi to the townlet of Manglisi is populated by a continuous chain of settlements such as Bagebi, Akhaldaba, Tskneti, Betania and Tsveri. A portion of the Vere river in Tbilisi flows in a set of corrugated steel tunnels under the Varaziskhevi–Tamarashvili Street motorway constructed from 2009 to 2010.

The 45 km (28 mi) long Vera has a basin area of 194 km^{2} (75 mi^{2}). The river is fed by snow melt, rain, and underground springs. It is characterized by periodic flash floods such as one in June 2015 which inflicted severe damage on the city's infrastructure, including its zoo, and resulted in at least 20 fatalities.

The Vere, as explained by the early 18th-century Georgian scholar Prince Vakhushti of Kartli, was formerly known as the Skvireti or Skoreti (სკვირეთი, სკორეთი). This hydronym appears in the medieval Georgian Chronicles. The Vere river valley is home to several cultural landmarks; the 12th-century Betania Monastery is located near the sources of the river, while the Lurji Monastery, Tbilisi Zoo, and the children's recreational park Mziuri, are close to the mouth, in Tbilisi.
