= Lurji Monastery =

Georgian Orthodox monastery in Tbilisi, Georgia

Lurji Monastery ლურჯი მონასტერი
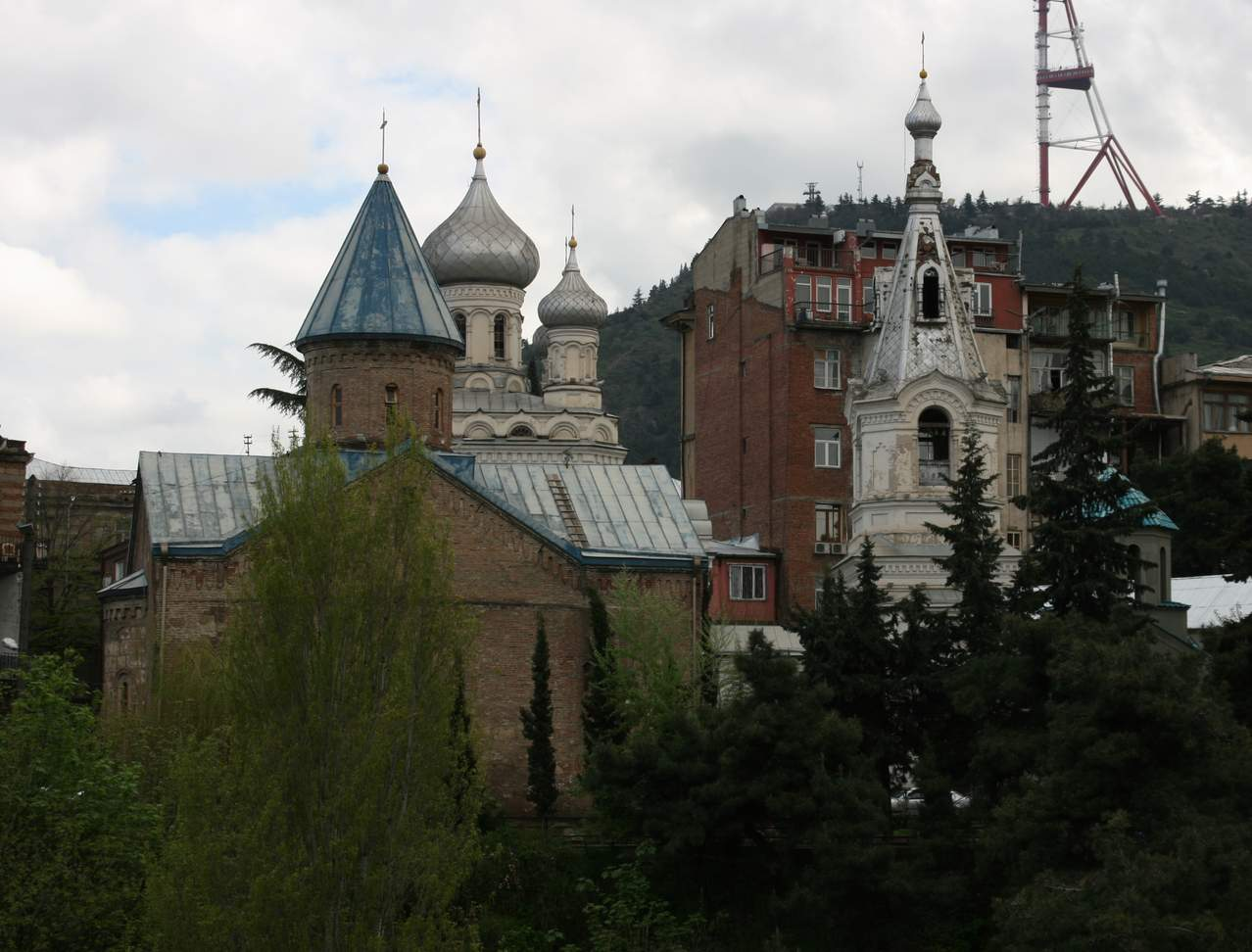
- The Lurji Monastery and the Church of St. John the Theologian in Tbilisi

Religion
- Affiliation: Georgian Orthodox

Location
- Location: Tbilisi, Georgia
- Interactive map of Lurji Monastery ლურჯი მონასტერი

Architecture
- Type: Church
- Completed: 12th-19th century

The Lurji Monastery (Georgian: ლურჯი მონასტერი), that is the "Blue Monastery", is a 12th-century Georgian Orthodox church built in the name of Saint Andrew in the Vere neighborhood of Tbilisi, Georgia. The popular historical name lurji ("blue") is derived from its roof, adorned with glazed blue tile.

== History ==
The church stands in the central part of Tbilisi, at the Vere Park, on the right bank of the Mtkvari, not far from the mouth of the Vere River. The original edifice of the Lurji Monastery was built in the 1180s, in the reign of Queen Tamar. It was a domed cross-in-square design, with a pair of dome-bearing columns and an extended apse. A lengthy inscription in the southern tympanum, in the medieval Georgian asomtavruli script, identifies a sponsor, Basil, the former archbishop of Kartli. The heavily damaged church was restored as a three-nave brick basilica, without a dome, in the 17th century. In the 18th century, the church was in possession of the Gabashvili noble family. In 1873, under the Russian rule, the church was reconstructed, according to Aleksandr Chizhov's project, with new brick walls attached and a new round dome, alien to the Georgian architectural forms, was added. A new church, that of St. John the Theologian, a typical Russian design, was built south to the Lurji Monastery, under the viceroy Grigory Galitzine from 1898 to 1901.

During the Soviet era, the Lurji Monastery building was used as a factory, a warehouse, and finally, as the Museum of Georgian Medicine. In 1990, the Lurji Monastery was restored to the Georgian Orthodox Church and Christian services were resumed. In 1995, the old dome was replaced with a new conical one which was more in line with traditional Georgian design. Of the original 12th-century structure, only an apse with large windows adorned with fretwork framing, lower half of southern wall, and a couple of stone rows of western and northern façades survive.
