= 2015 Tbilisi flood =

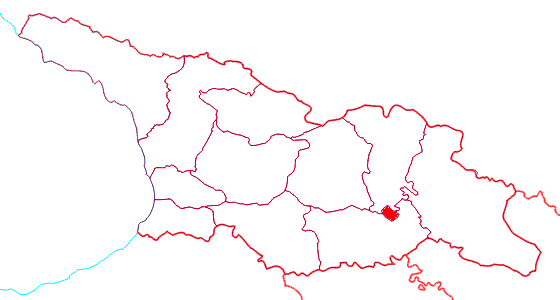
- Location of Tbilisi in Georgia
- Date: 13-14 June 2015
- Location: Vere River valley, Tbilisi, Georgia
- Deaths: 20 (confirmed)

A significant flood occurred in the Vere River valley in Tbilisi, the capital of Georgia, on the night of 13 to 14 June 2015. It resulted in at least 20 human deaths and struck the Tbilisi Zoo, leaving half of its animal inhabitants either dead or on the loose.

== Background ==
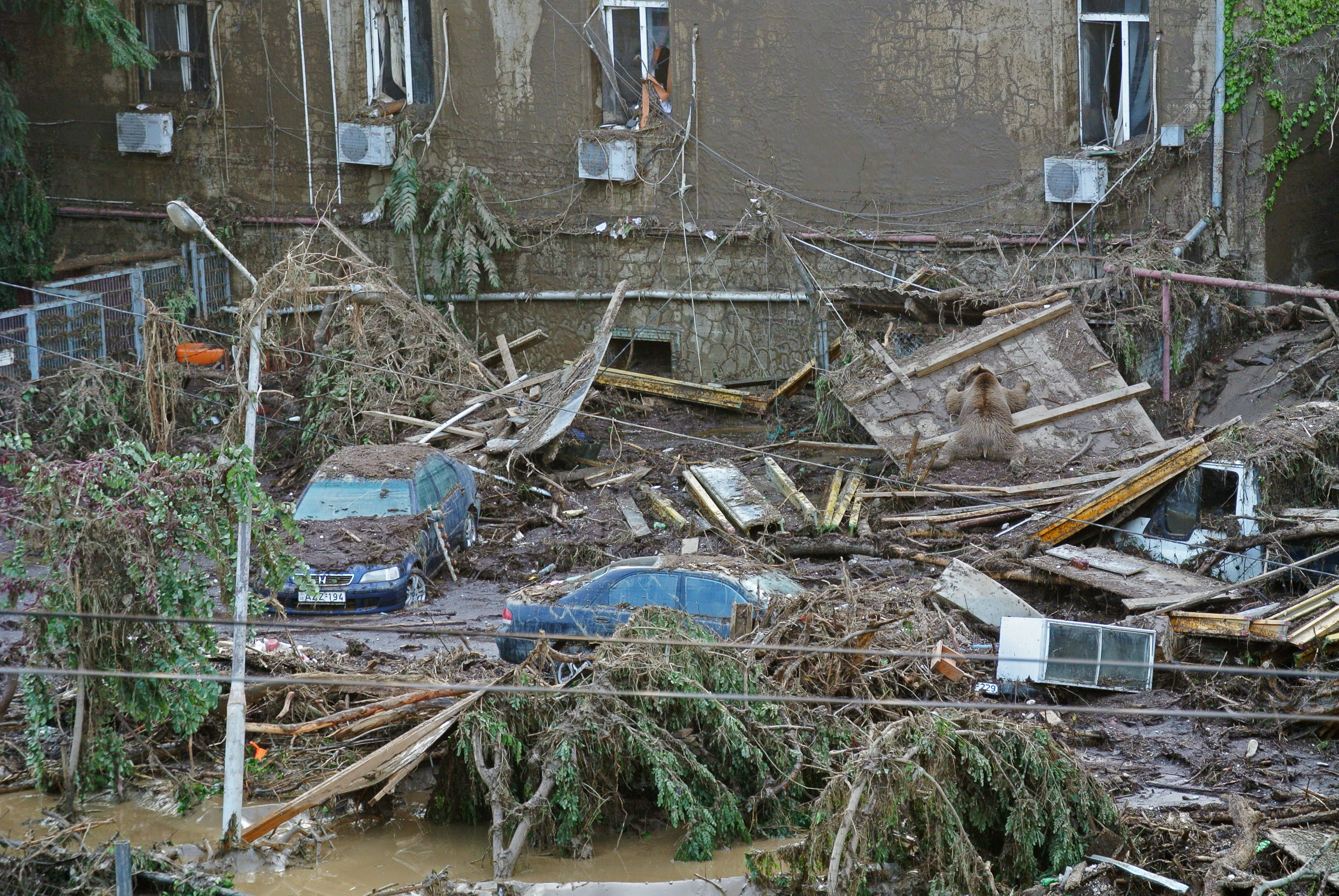
Tbilisi Zoo after the flood

The Vere, a right tributary of the Mtkvari, runs through Tbilisi's Vake and Saburtalo neighborhoods. It is characterized by periodic flash floods, which had turned this normally small stream into a surging river, causing significant flooding in 1960, 1963, 1972, and 1995. In 1972, the flood resulted in several fatalities and completely inundated the Tbilisi Zoo.

== Damage and casualties ==
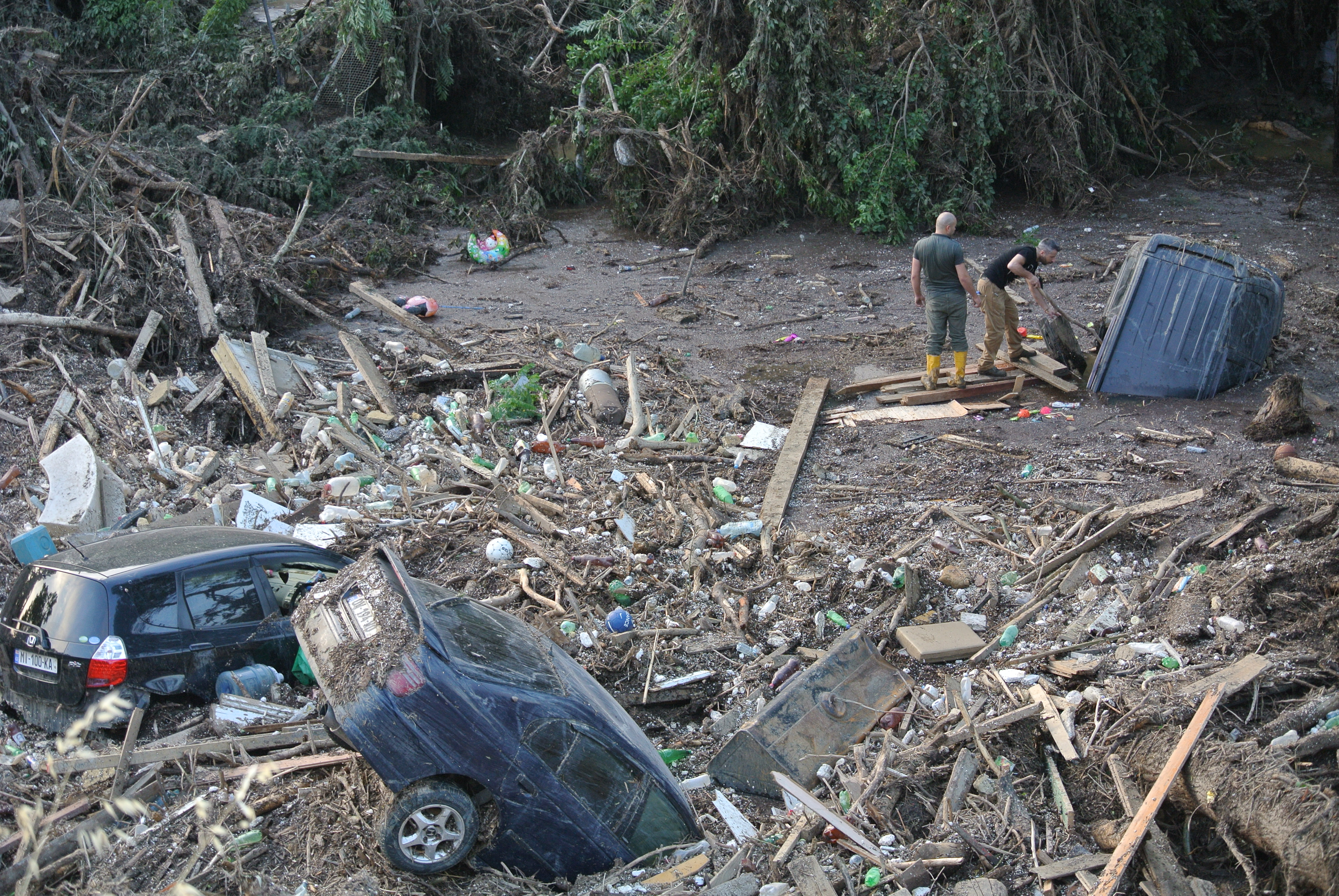
Vere River after the flood

After several hours of intense rain on June 13, 2015, a landslide occurred above the village of Akhaldaba, which is located about 20 km southwest of Tbilisi. A million m3 of land, mud, and trees were carried by the landslide as it moved into Tbilisi and dammed up the Vere River twice, first at a 10 m wide channel at Tamarashvili Street and then at a channel beneath Heroes' Square, a significant traffic intersection that was connected to Tamarashvili Street by the Vere Valley Highway.

The resulting flood inflicted severe damage on the Tbilisi Zoo, Heroes' Square, Mziuri Park, and nearby streets and houses, resulting in at least 20 deaths, including three zoo workers. One of them, a 56-year-old woman, had recently returned to work after having had an arm amputated two weeks earlier after a tiger mauled it. A young rescue officer, Zurab Muzashvili, who died after having rescued seven people, was posthumously awarded the Medal for Civic Devotion.

About 36 people were hospitalized for mild-to-moderate injuries; most of them were discharged from hospitals on the same day. Of the 24 people reported as missing as of late 14 June, 6 remained unaccountable for on 16 June. More than 40 families were left homeless and 22,000 people were left without electricity. The Georgian government reported a preliminary estimated flood damage cost from GEL 40 million to 100 million.

== Animals in streets ==
The Tbilisi Zoo lost more than 300 animals, nearly half of its inhabitants: the majority were killed by flooding. Several surviving inhabitants of the zoo—a hippopotamus, big cats, wolves, bears, and hyenas—escaped from destroyed pens and cages to the streets of Tbilisi and a police unit was employed to round them up. Some were killed, whilst others were recaptured and brought back to the zoo. The media ran footage showing the hippopotamus making its way to a flooded Heroes' Square, one of Tbilisi's major roadway hubs, where it was subdued with a tranquilizer dart. On 17 June a white tiger remaining on the loose attacked and mortally wounded a man in a storehouse near the zoo. The animal was eventually shot dead by the police. An African penguin was found at the Red Bridge border crossing with Azerbaijan, having swum some 60 km south from Tbilisi.

== Response ==
=== Local ===
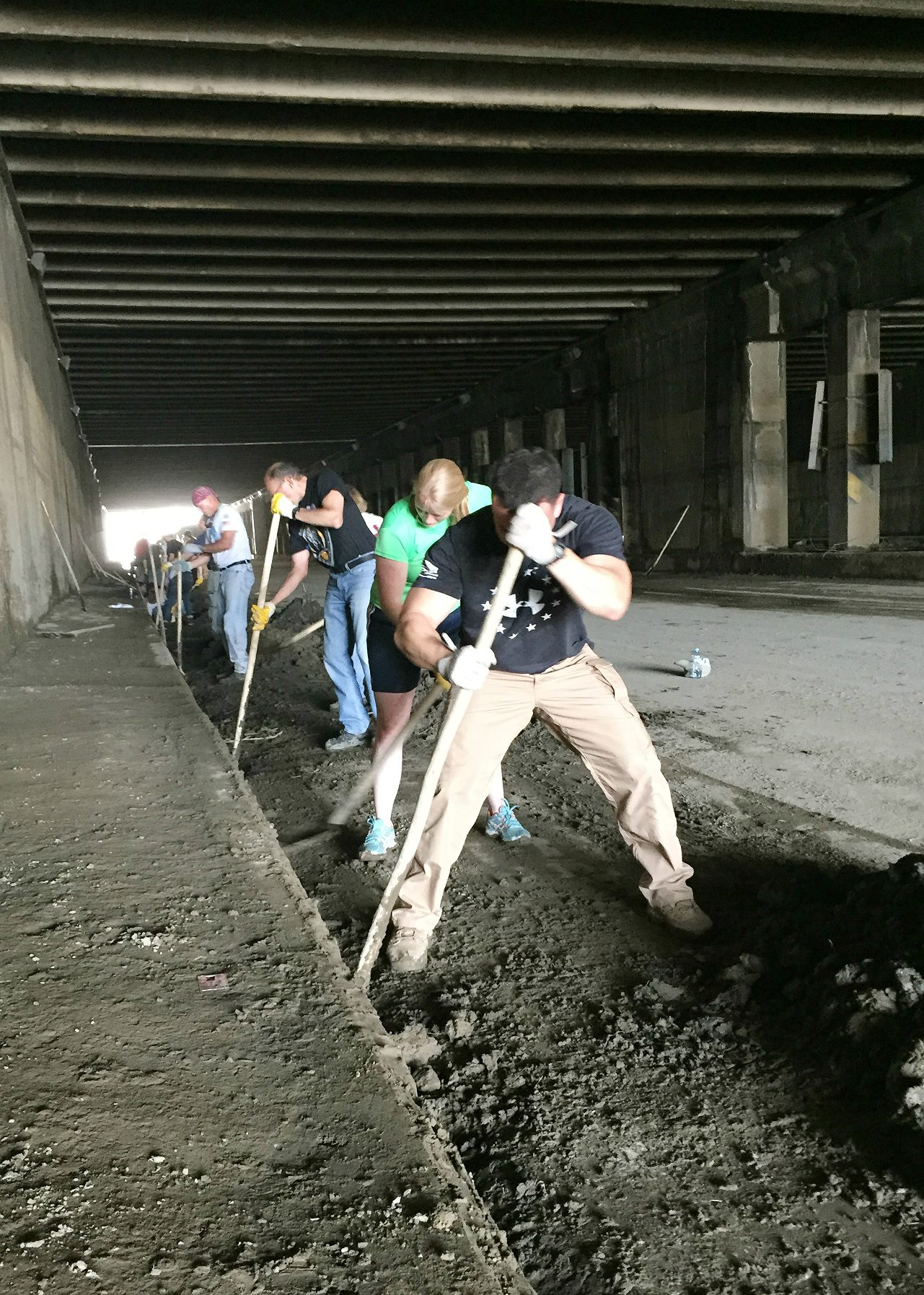
The U.S. Embassy employees join volunteers in the clean-up works.

Police force, emergency services, and army units were deployed for rescue efforts. They were helped by hundreds of local volunteers. Scores of peoples trapped by the floods were airlifted by rescuers.

15 June was declared a national day of mourning in Georgia. President Giorgi Margvelashvili said he would allocate funds from President's Discretionary Fund to assist the affected families. Catholicos Patriarch Ilia II, an influential head of the Georgian Orthodox Church, in his Sunday sermon, blamed the floods on the "sin" of the former Communist regime which, he said, built the zoo in its current location using money raised from destroying churches and melting down their bells.

=== International ===
The United Nations refugee agency, UNHCR, mobilized its Tbilisi office to organize an emergency response. Many governments of the world, such Latvia, Armenia, Azerbaijan, Turkey, Ukraine, Lithuania, the United States, and Russia offered their help. The European Union stated its Emergency Response Coordination Centre was ready to deploy assistance. Poland's Foreign Ministry allocated €100,000 to assist Georgia.

The Prague Zoo, along with other Czech zoos, dispatched a team of specialists with experience in dealing with floods. The Israel Ministry of Foreign Affairs also sent an emergency team to assist, led by veterinarians from the Jerusalem Biblical Zoo and the Ramat Gan Safari in Israel. The city of Šiauliai, Lithuania, decided to organize a charity concert to help the families affected by the flood. The Polish businessman Mariusz Artur Napora offered to hold a charity auction in Poland.

== Gallery ==
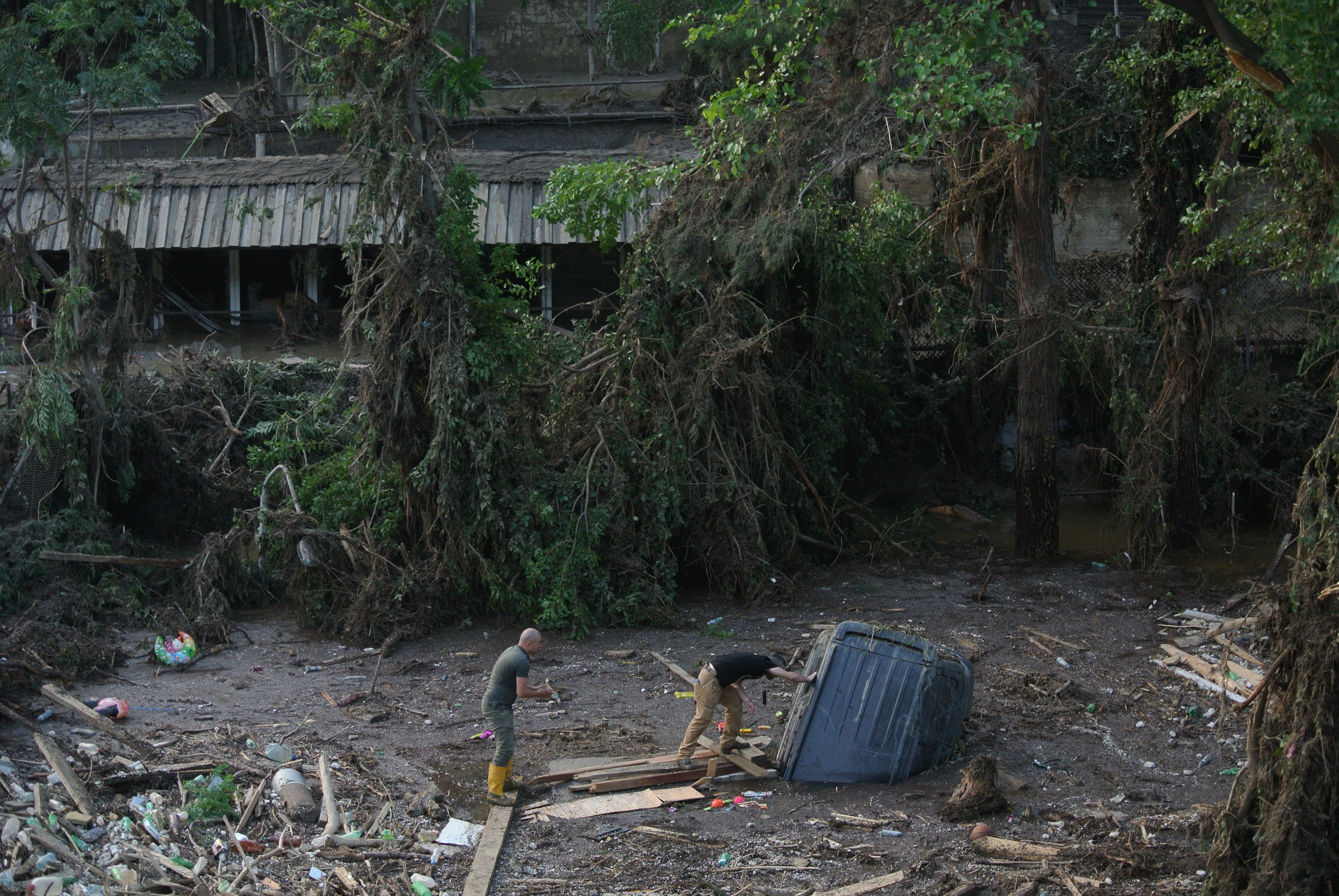
Tbilisi Zoo after the flood

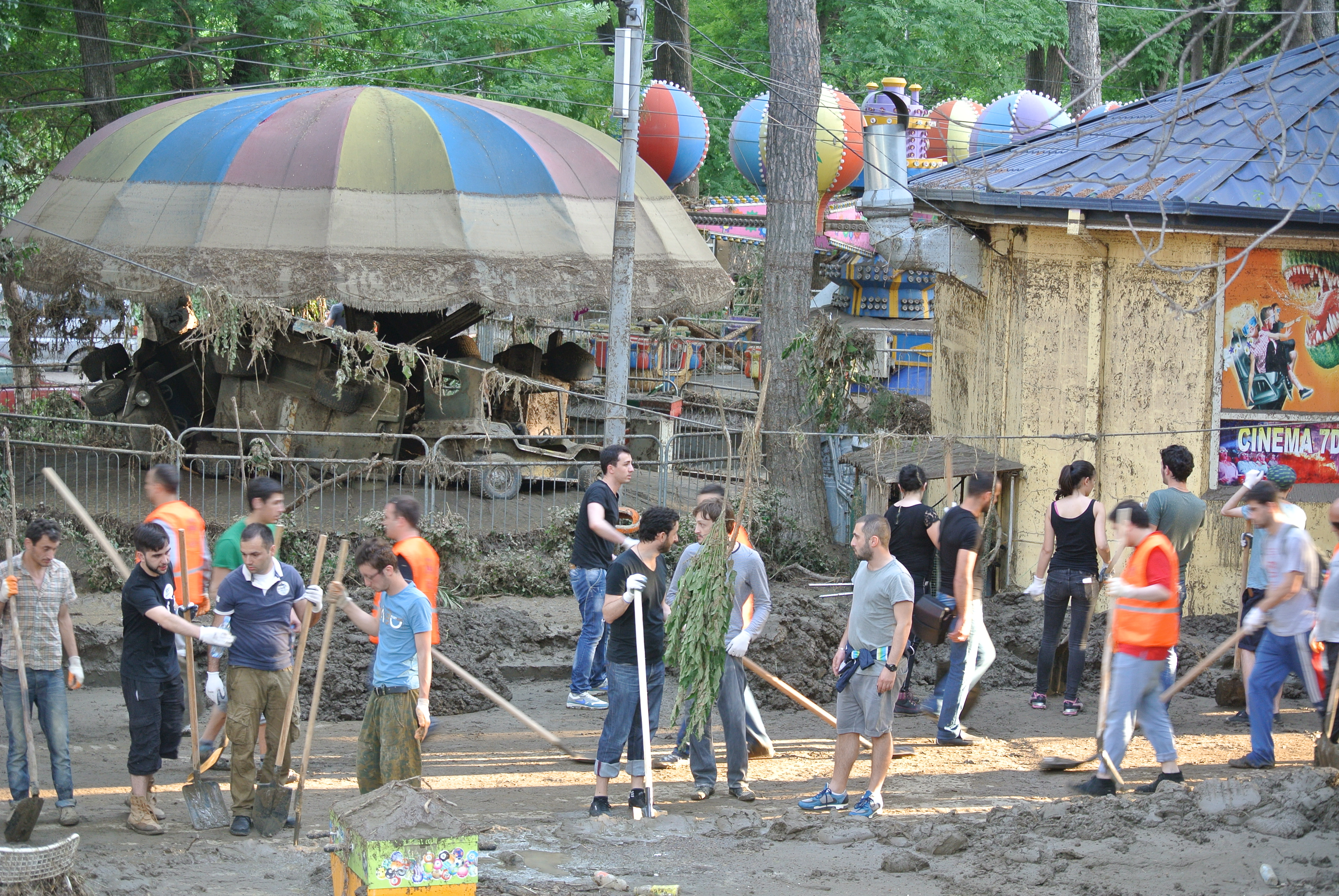
Tbilisi Zoo after the flood

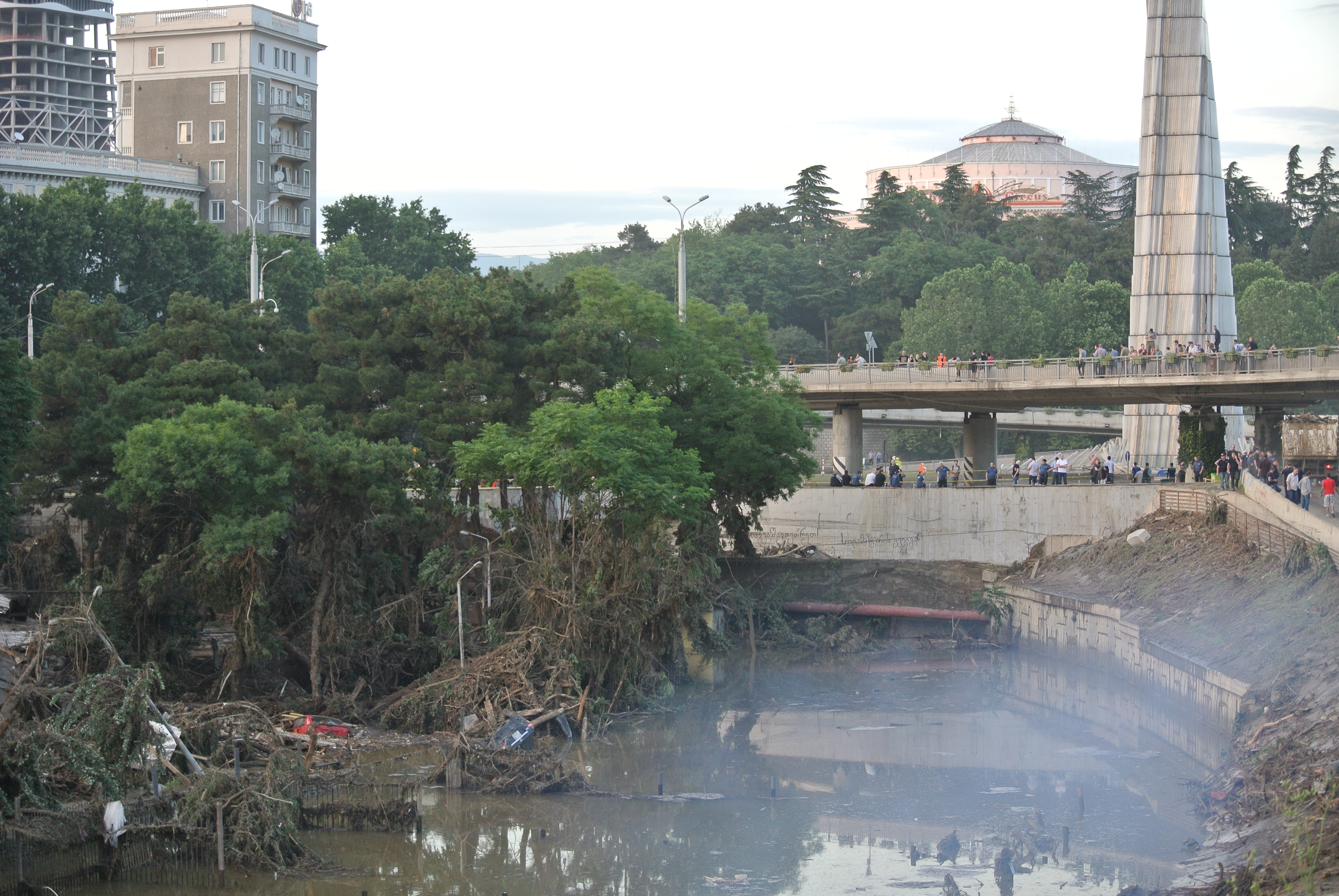
After the flood

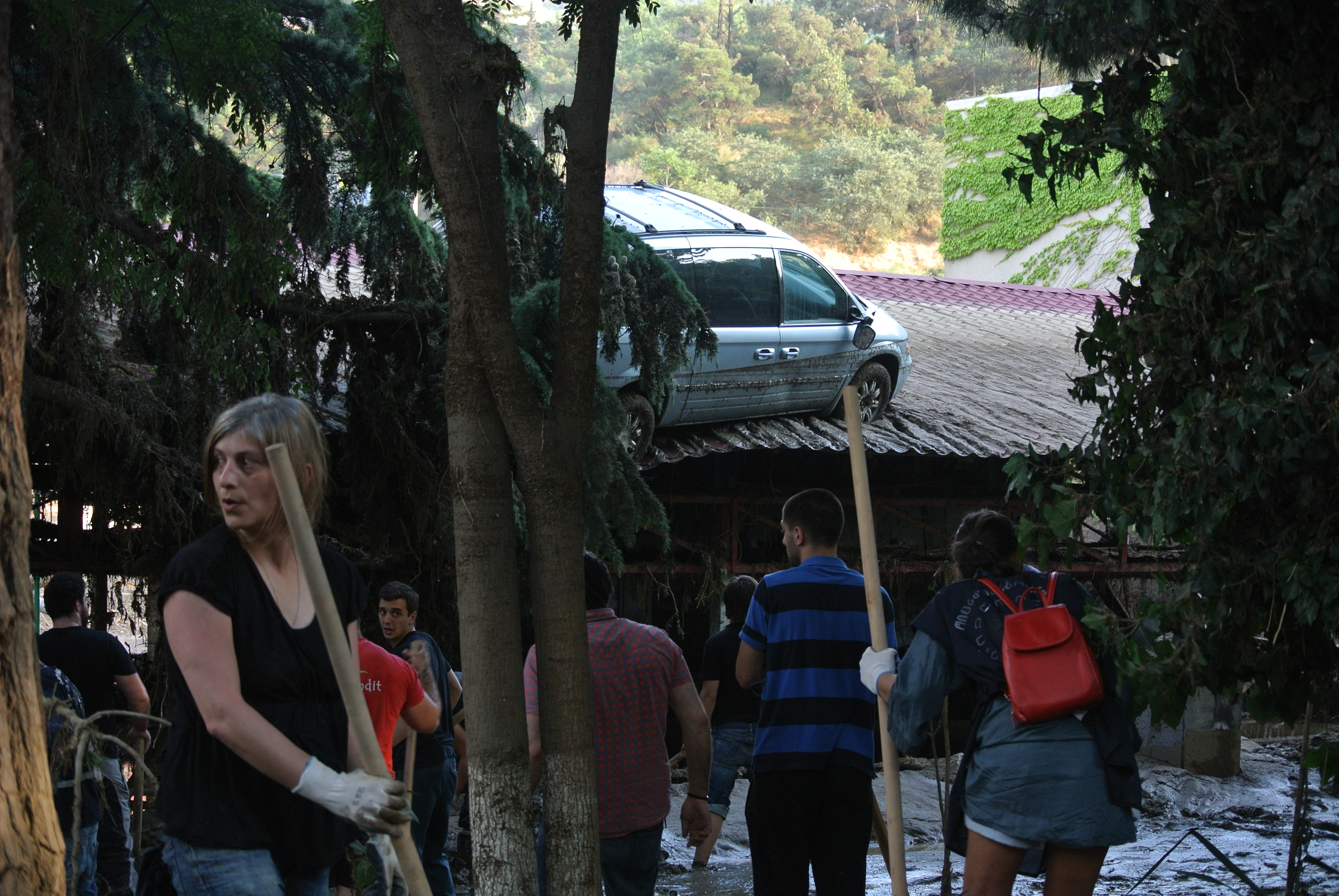
Inside of Tbilisi Zoo after the flood

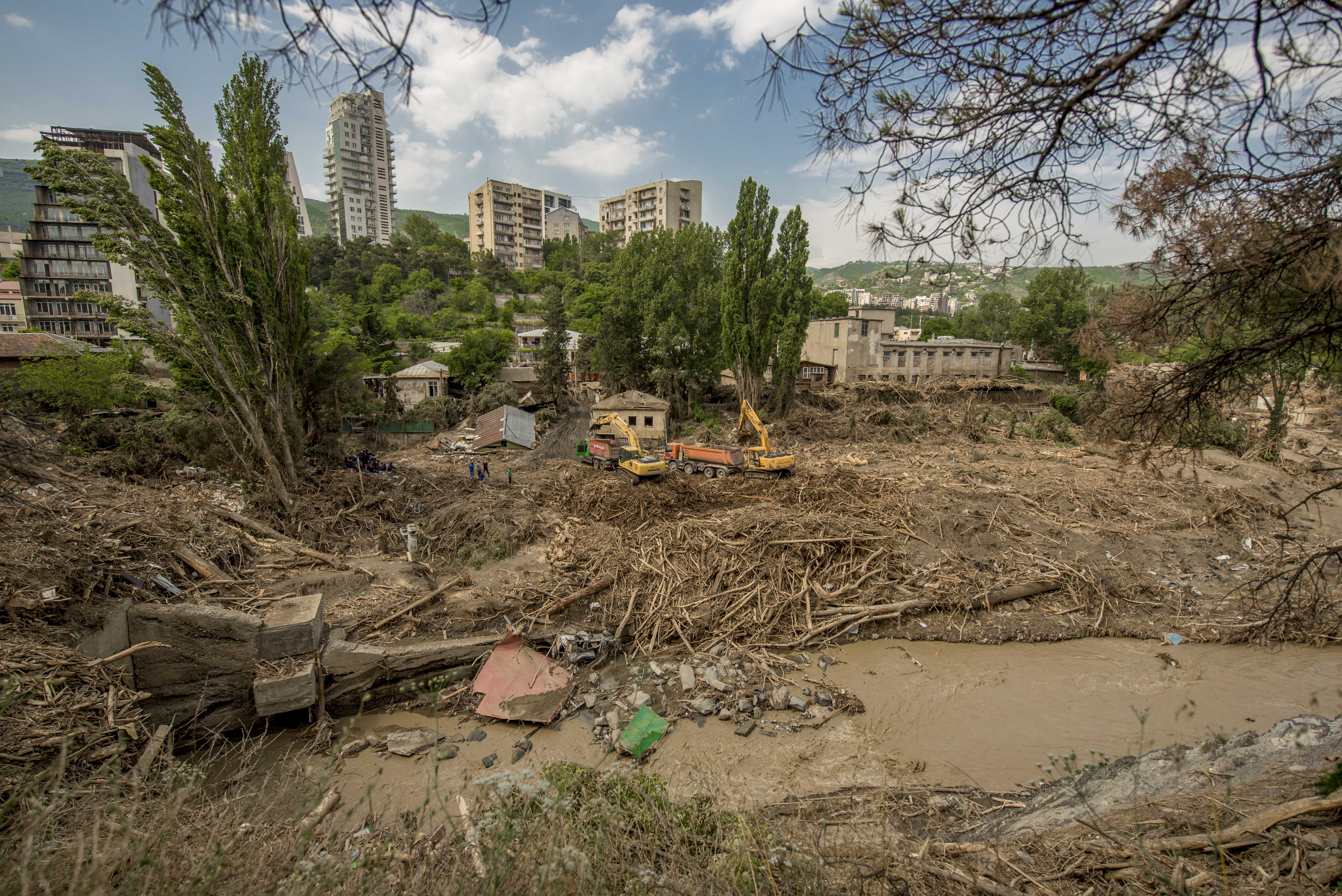
Flood area just west of Tamarashvili Street

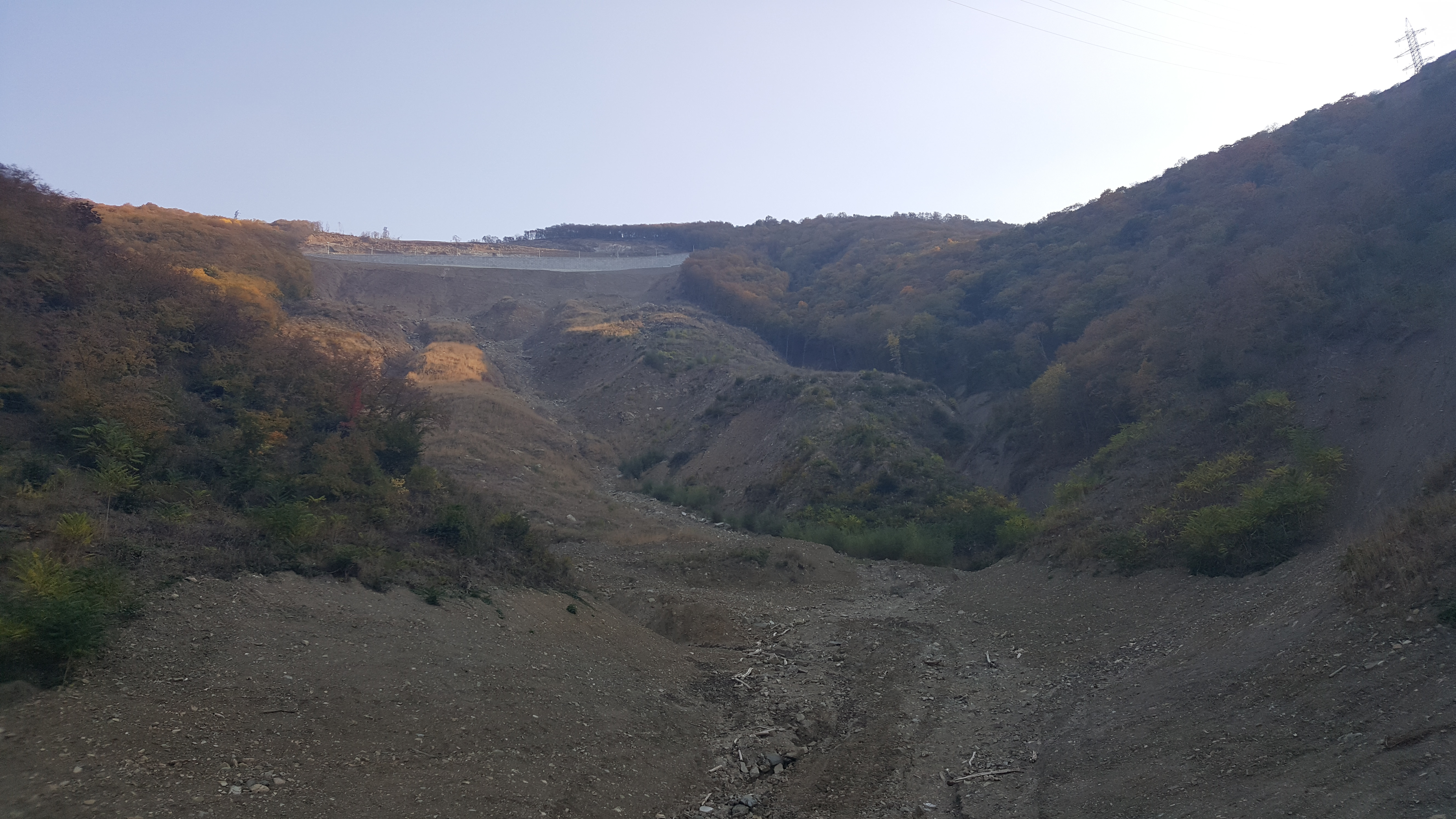
The Trad forest devastated, three years later (picture taken in 2018).
