= Borjomi (brand) =

Carbonated mineral water brand from country of Georgia

Borjomi ბორჯომი
- English Version Logo

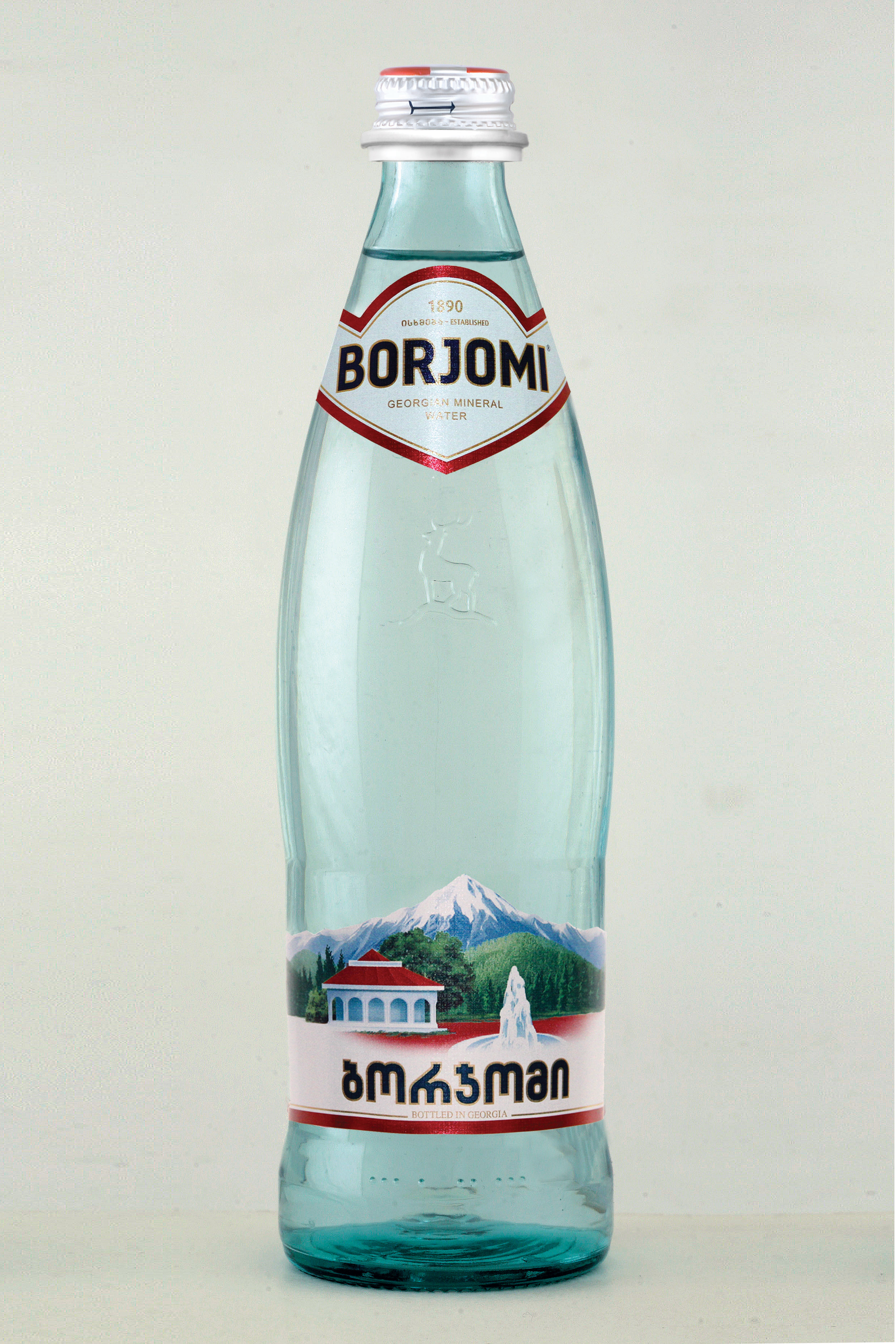
- Glass bottle with Georgian label
- Country: Georgia
- Produced by: IDS Borjomi
- Introduced: 1890; 136 years ago
- Calcium (Ca): 20–150 mg/dm^{3}
- Chloride (Cl): 250–500 mg/dm^{3}
- Bicarbonate (HCO_{3}): 3500–5000 mg/dm^{3}
- Magnesium (Mg): 20–150 mg/dm^{3}
- Potassium (K): 15–45 mg/dm^{3}
- Sodium (Na): 1000–2000 mg/dm^{3}
- TDS: 5000–7500 mg/dm^{3}
- Website: borjomi.com
- All concentrations in milligrams per liter (mg/L); pH without units

Borjomi (Georgian: ბორჯომი) is a brand of naturally carbonated mineral water from springs in the Borjomi Gorge of central Georgia. The artesian springs in the valley are fed by water that filters from glaciers covering the peaks of the Bakuriani mountains at altitudes of up to 2,300 m (7,500 ft). The water rises to the surface without pumping and is transported by pipes to two bottling plants in the town of Borjomi.

The mineral springs of the Borjomi valley were known to locals for over a thousand years but did not reach wider recognition until the early 1800s, after the Russian Imperial Army stationed in the area became aware of the water's salubrious effects. By the 1890s, Borjomi had become famous throughout the Russian Empire, had earned the favor of the Russian imperial dynasty of Romanov and was being bottled in the Georgian estates of Grand Duke Mikhail of Russia. After the Russian Revolution of 1917 and subsequent Soviet takeover of Georgia, the Borjomi enterprise was nationalized and the water was made into a top Soviet export.

Currently, Borjomi is produced by IDS Borjomi Georgia, which is part of IDS Borjomi International. In June 2022, the controlling company of IDS Borjomi International had to relinquish some of its shares to the Government of Georgia as part of a deal to comply with international sanctions. As a result, the Chairman of the Board of Directors of IDS Borjomi International became the representative of the Georgian government.

In 2005, the production of Borjomi reached 200 million bottles. In 2007, the international certification company Bureau Veritas granted Borjomi the international certificate of production safety and quality ISO 22000. Today, Borjomi is exported to 40 countries of the world.

The use of Borjomi water has been suggested by the Georgian and Russian researchers for complex treatment of several digestive diseases and diabetes mellitus.

== History ==
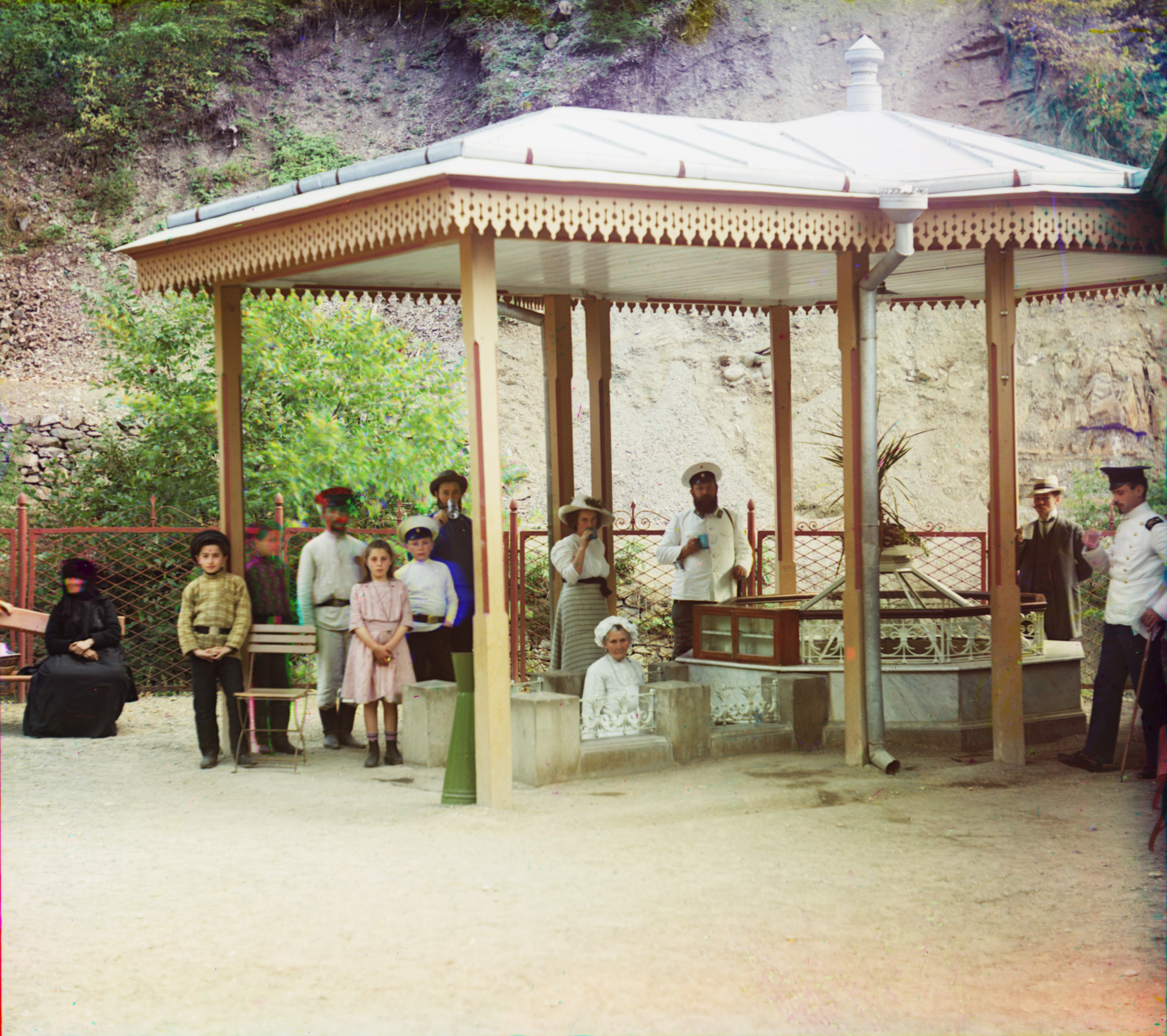
The Yevgeniyevsky spring in Borjomi. Photo by Sergey Prokudin-Gorsky, 1912

The mineral springs of the Borjomi valley were discovered over one thousand years ago. Seven large rock tubs discovered by archeologists dating back to the beginning of the 7th century attest to the availability and use of the spring waters, most likely for bathing purposes. The springs were abandoned before being rediscovered in the early 19th century. By that time, as a result of the incessant warfare, Borjomi and its environs had been depopulated and covered with impassable forests.

In 1829, when the Imperial Russian Army Kherson Grenadier Regiment was deployed in Borjomi for operations against the Ottoman Empire, Russian soldiers found mineral springs on the right bank of Borjomi river. Intrigued by the find, Colonel Pavel Popov, the commander of the regiment, ordered that the springs be cleaned and that the water be bottled and transported to the military base. Popov, who suffered from stomach disease tried the water first. Seeing positive results, he ordered the construction of rock walls around the spring and he had a bath house built nearby, along with a small cottage house for himself. In 1837, when the Kherson regiment was replaced by the Georgian grenadiers regiment, its medical doctor Amirov examined the water components and their effects, sending the first results of analysis to Saint Petersburg and Moscow. By 1841, the healing effects of Borjomi water were so famous that the viceroy of the Russian Tsar in the Caucasus Yevgeni Golovin brought his sick daughter to the springs for treatment. In light of the quick results of the treatment, he called the first spring Yekaterinsky (Russian: Екатерининский) after his daughter Yekaterina and the second Yevgeniyevsky (Евгеньевский) after himself.

Golovin also expedited the official transfer of the waters from the military to civil authorities. In 1850, a mineral water park was opened in Borjomi and in 1854, the authorities commissioned construction of the first bottling plant. Borjomi water gained popularity for its curing effects all over the Russian Empire and the government began building palaces, parks, public gardens and hotels to accommodate incoming tourists and patients. The commute from Tiflis to Borjomi usually took 8–9 hours by phaetons, however the new Mikhaylovo-Borjomi railroad built in 1894 significantly reduced the length of the journey. Renowned figures such as Anton Chekhov, Pyotr Tchaikovsky as well as members of the royal Russian family were among the common visitors of the springs. By that time, Borjomi was a rival of similar European spas, such as Vichy, frequented by Russian tourists, the fact that earned for Borjomi the reputation of "the Russian Vichy" and "the pearl of the Caucasus".

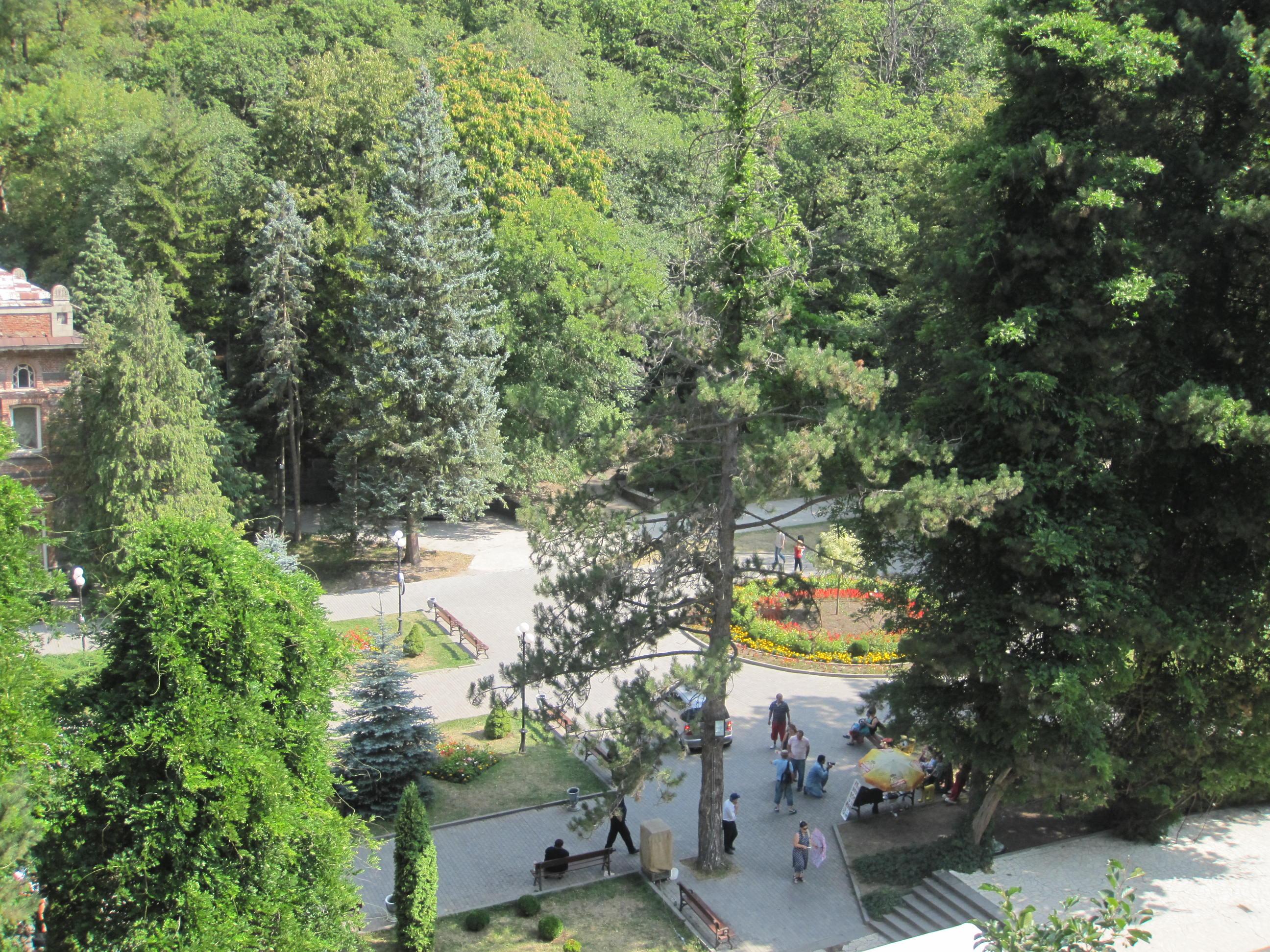
The Borjomi-Kharagauli National Park near the source of the Borjomi mineral water.

In 1894, Grand Duke Mikhail Romanov built a bottling plant in the Borjomi park which continued to operate until the 1950s. A glass factory followed in 1896. The income from the Borjomi waters enterprise contributed to the wealth of Mikhail's son and successor Nikolay, who was the richest of all Russian grand dukes by 1914. In 1854, 1,350 bottles of water were produced, by 1905 the number had reached 320,000 and by 1913 over 9 million bottles were sold. After the establishment of Soviet rule in Georgia, Borjomi was widely sold around the Soviet Union and was favored by Soviet leaders such as Joseph Stalin. Exploration of the Borjomi Gorge was conducted in 1927. Between then and 1982, 57 exploration wells (depths ranging from 18.4 m (60 ft) to 1,502 m (4,928 ft)) were drilled. In 1961, 423,000 bottles of Borjomi was exported to 15 countries including the United States, France and Austria. During the existence of the Soviet Union, Borjomi was recognized as the third best known brand of the USSR after the Volga car and Aeroflot airlines. In the 1980s, annual production of Borjomi water reached 400 million bottles. Production slowed with the collapse of the Soviet Union and economic stagnation in the independent Republic of Georgia. In 1995, bottling of Borjomi was restarted by the Georgian Glass and Mineral Waters Company (GG&MW), which increased the production forty-fold. According to the company, 80% of Borjomi produced that year was exported abroad—more than half of this amount to Russia. Despite counterfeit drinks being produced under the Borjomi label as a result of rising piracy during the 1990s, Borjomi water was able to reclaim its reputation by 2000 in a distinctive packaging campaign. The piracy also slowed due to the 1998 Russian financial crisis.

In May 2006, Russia banned imports of Georgian mineral waters, declaring them unsafe. The ban was lifted after 7 years in 2013. Georgia viewed this as an attempt to restrict access to the Russian market and making Borjomi a pawn in post-Soviet political power play. As a result of the ban, GG&MW lost GEL 25 million in 2006, but the company declared the crisis to have been overcome by 2008, with sales volumes reaching pre-2006 level. The sales and export of Borjomi mineral water dropped again by 30-40% starting from October 2008 due to the Great Recession. But already in 2010 the company declared that sales figures of Borjomi were the same as the company had before the ban. In 2011 sales company sold 15% more Borjomi than they were selling before the ban. Today Borjomi is sold in 40 countries worldwide. Today, Borjomi in post-soviet countries is a number one brand in imported mineral water brand segment.

Borjomi is currently produced by the IDS Borjomi Georgia, which is a part of the International company - IDS Borjomi International, registered in Curaçao. As of June 13, 2022, the controlling company of IDS BORJOMI International transferred 7.73% of the company's share to the Government of Georgia free of charge. As a result, the Chairman of the Board of Directors of IDS BORJOMI International became the representative of the Government of Georgia.

Today, the company produces 3 products in the Borjom-Bakuriani valley:

- Borjomi
- Likani
- Bakuriani

== Features ==
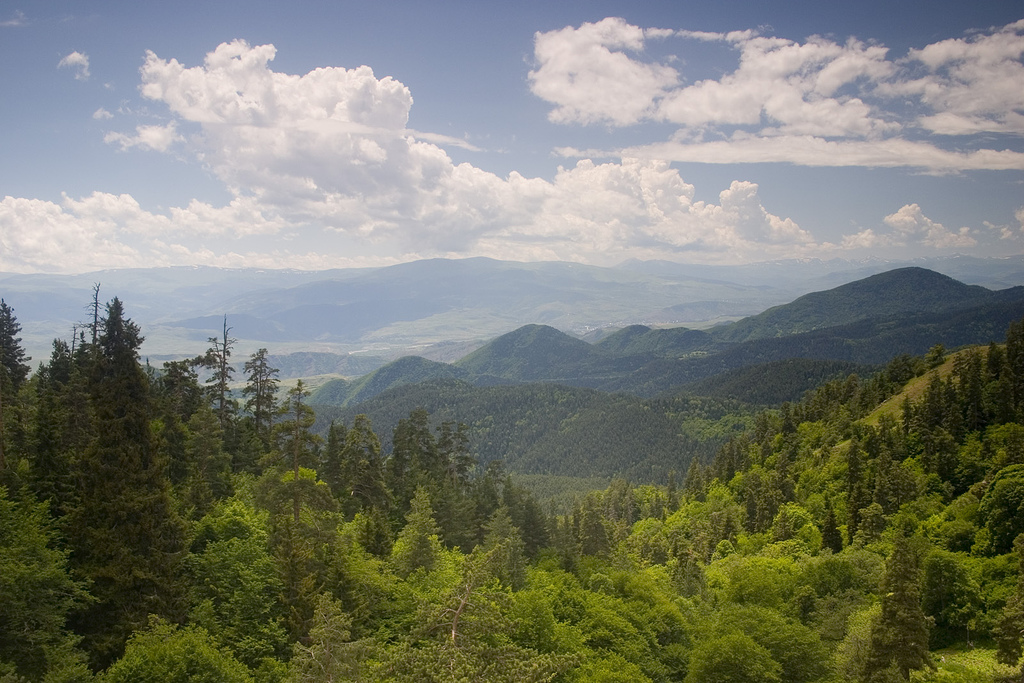
Borjomi Gorge

Borjomi is a water of volcanic origin which is over 1,500 years old. It is pushed up to the surface from 1500m below ground by natural carbon dioxide pressure. Borjomi does not cool down before it reaches the surface and comes out at a temperature of 38–41 °C (100–106 °F). The Borjomi springs are located in the central part of the Adjara-Imereti mountain range of Greater Caucasus at an altitude of 760–920 m (2,490–3,020 ft) above sea level. The average depth of each of the nine spring wells is 1,200–1,500 m (3,900–4,900 ft).

In order to preserve the mineral composition of the springs, in 2006 the Georgian Ministry of Environment Protection and Natural Resources approved a production plan for 2006–2031 estimating 561,000 litres per day which allows bottling of over 1 million bottles a day using 10 wells in Borjomi Gorge. The wells are located in 3 exploitation lots: Central (in the vicinity of Borjomi town), Likani (in Likani village) and Vashlovani-Kvibisi (in villages Vashlovani and Kvibisi). The water received from the wells travels by a 25 km (16 mi) stainless steel pipeline to two bottling plants where it is cooled and bottled. The first plant specializes in glass bottling, the second in PET bottling.

The production of mineral water and the associated tourist economy in Borjomi and the nearby Borjomi-Kharagauli National Park make up 10 percent of Georgia's export trade. Construction of the Baku-Tbilisi-Ceyhan oil pipeline near the Borjomi has been controversial because of potential negative environmental and economic impacts on the region.

== Packaging ==
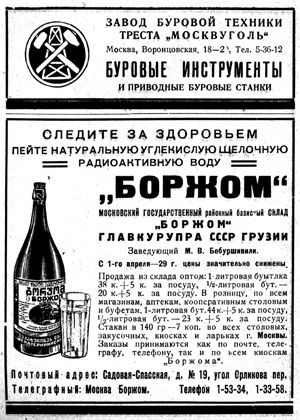
A Borjomi mineral water ad from 1929, showing the bottle and advertising the water as "radioactive". This property is no longer emphasized.

Borjomi comes in glass bottle sizes of 0.33 and 0.5 litres, plastic bottle sizes of 0.5 litre, 0,75 litres,1 litre and 1.25 litres and in 0.33 litre aluminum can. Glass bottles and PET bottles are screw-capped. The signature greenish color of the glass bottles (so-called Georgian Green) is based on a proprietary formula. As with other single-use plastic products, used water bottles make up a significant portion of Georgia's plastic pollution problem.

In February 2011, new packaging of Borjomi water presenting a new "modern look" was introduced, accentuating relief of the deer image and sign of the manufacturer on the label. In the end of 2019 Borjomi adopted a new design, following key design trends - simplicity and minimalism. The new bottles are more modern, feature the phrase "Georgian mineral water," and include silver stripes.

The current packaging design was introduced in 2024. This saw a return to the brand's classic look, introducing an oval which contains the logotype, deer and a scene of the local area. It was designed by British design agency Osborne Pike.

== Awards ==
- 1907 SPA Grand Prix
- 1909 Kazan Grand Golden Medal
- 1911 Dresden Diploma of Honour
- 1940 Tallinn Golden Medal
- 1975 Budapest Diploma of Honour, World Exhibition
- 1998 Novosibirsk Golden Medal
- 1996, 1997, 1998 St. Petersburg Golden Medal

== See also ==
- Nabeghlavi
- Lagidze water
