= Borjomi =

Borjomi ბორჯომი
- Town
- Borjomi
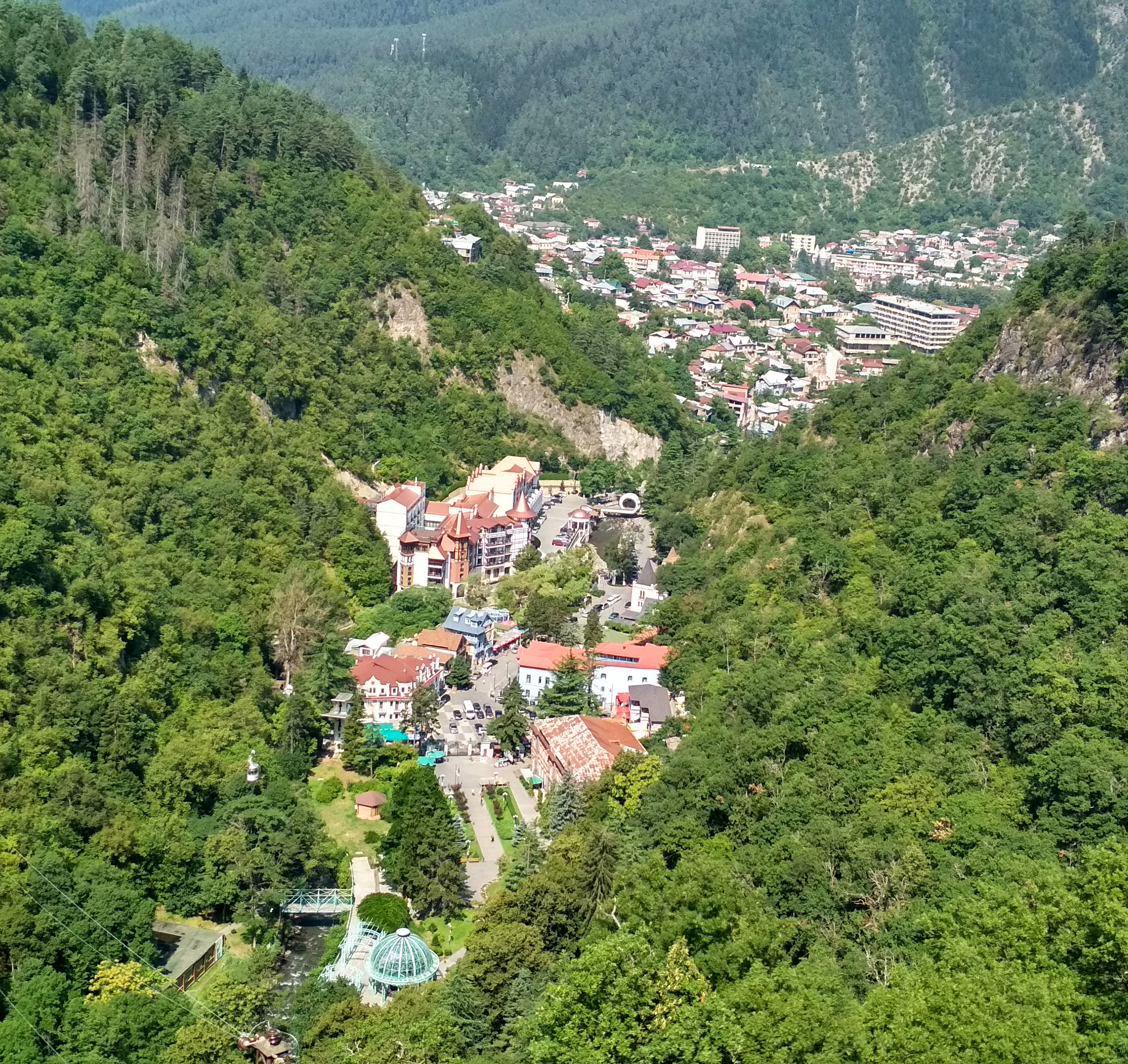
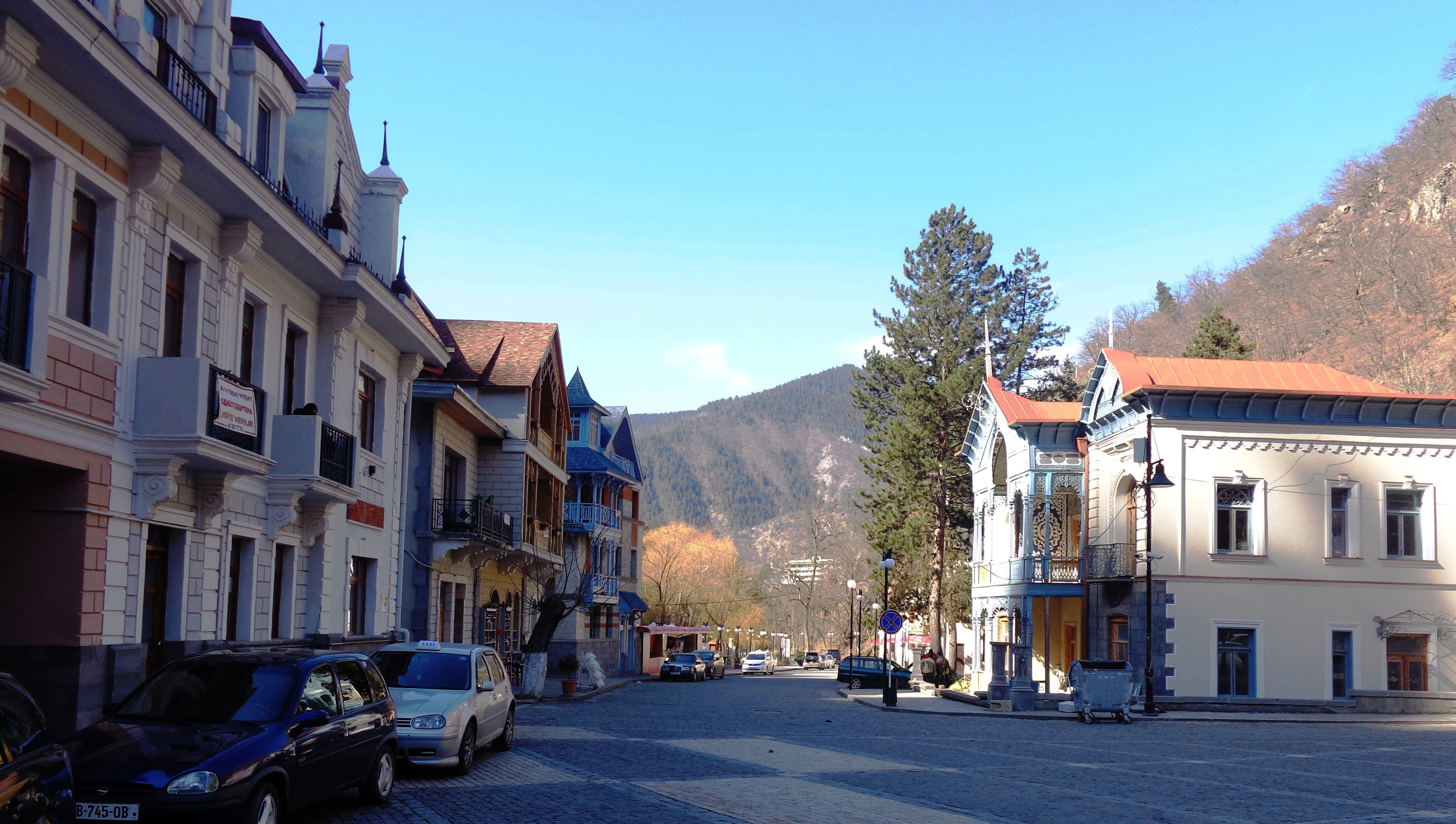
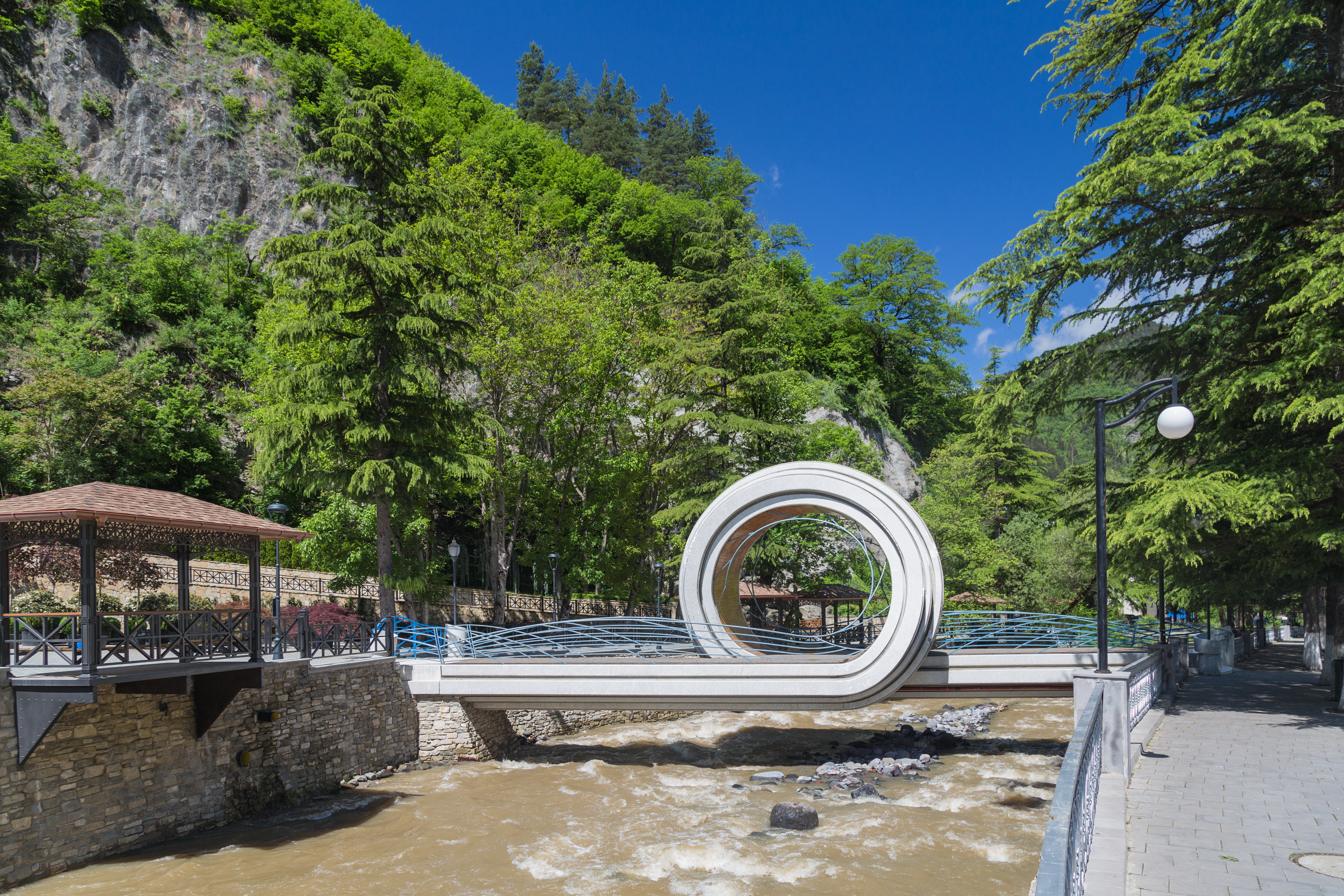
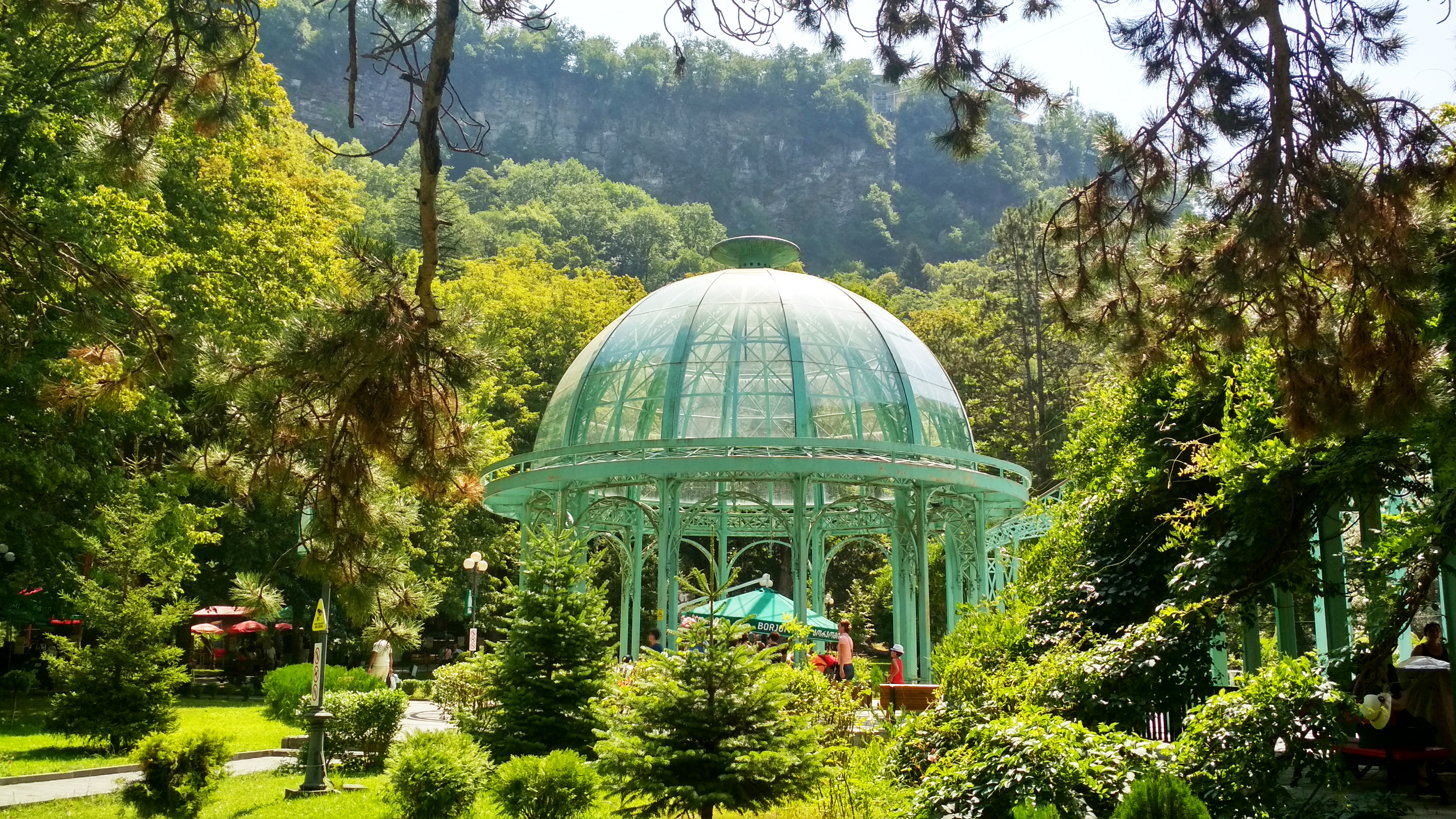
- Panorama of Borjomi Street near park Mobius Loop Bridge Borjomi Central Park

- Flag Coat of arms

- Location within Georgia Location within Samtskhe-Javakheti
- Coordinates: 41°50′20″N 43°22′45″E
- Country: Georgia
- Mkhare: Samtskhe-Javakheti
- Municipality: Borjomi

Area
  - Total: 63 km^{2} (24 sq mi)
  - Land: 43 km^{2} (17 sq mi)

Population (2024)
  - Total: 11,173
  - Density: 120/km^{2} (310/sq mi)
- Time zone: UTC+4 (Georgian Time)
- Website: https://www.borjomi.gov.ge/ka

Borjomi (Georgian: ბორჯომი [ˈbo̞ɾd͡ʒo̞mi]) is a resort town in south-central Georgia with a population of 11,173 (as of 2024). Located 165 km from Tbilisi, it is one of the six municipalities of the Samtskhe–Javakheti region and is situated in the northwestern part of the region in the picturesque Borjomi Gorge on the eastern edge of Borjomi-Kharagauli National Park.

The town is noted for its mineral water industry, the Romanov summer palace in Likani and the Borjomi-Kharagauli National Park. Borjomi mineral water is particularly well-known in Georgia as well as other countries that were part of the former Soviet Union; the bottling of mineral water is a major source of income for the area. Because of the supposed curative powers of the area's mineral springs, it is a frequent destination for people with health problems. Borjomi is also home to the most extensive ecologically-themed amusement park in the Caucasus.

== History ==
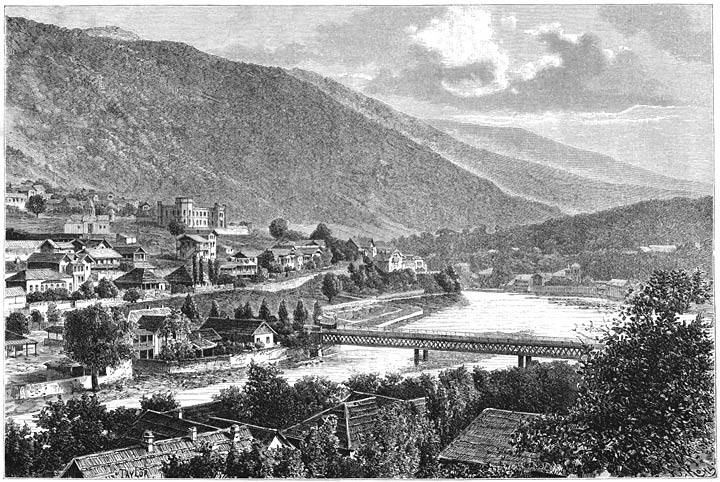
Borjomi in 1887

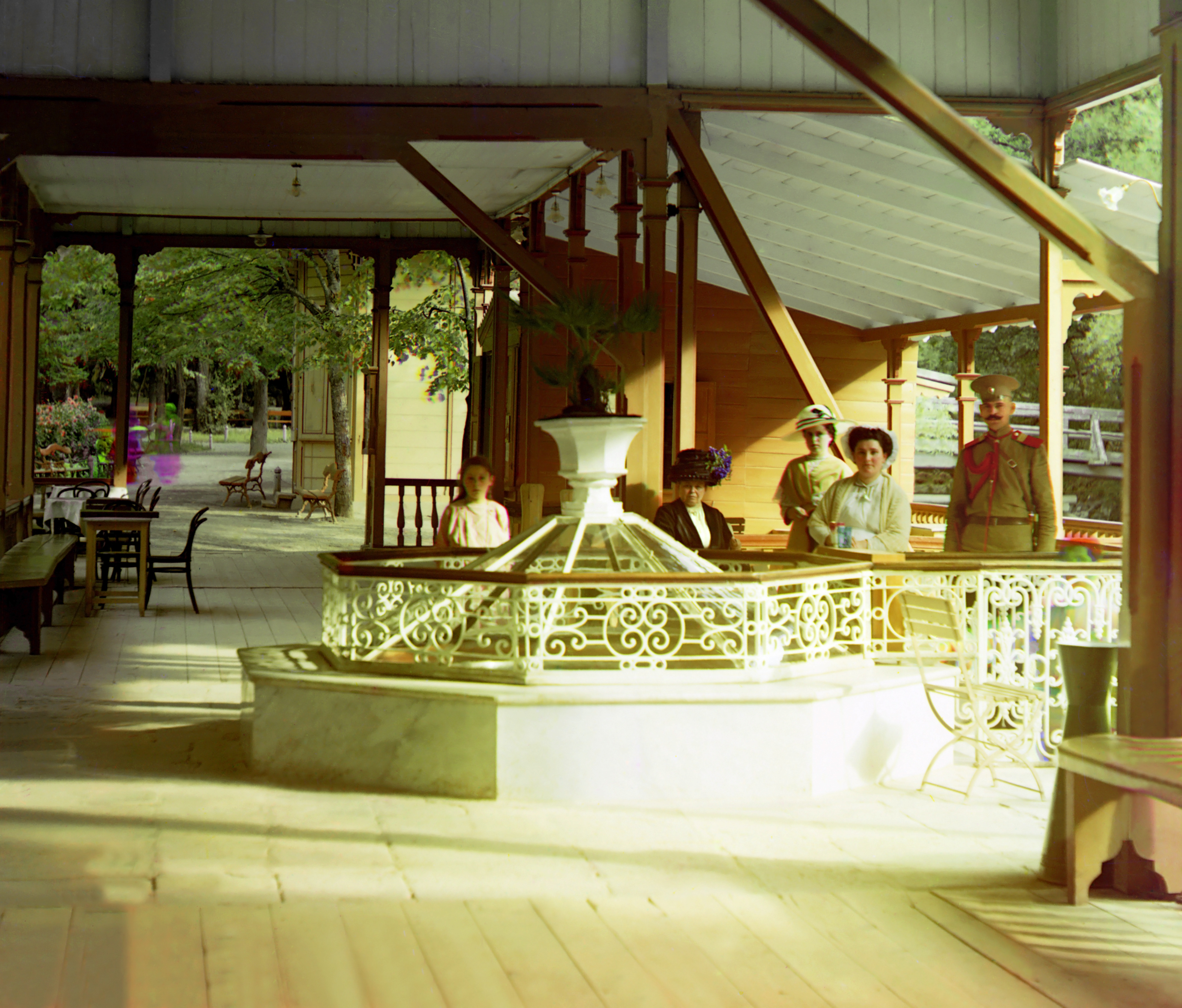
"Catherine's Spring" in Borjomi so named after General Golovin's daughter. Photo by Prokudin-Gorsky, 1905–15

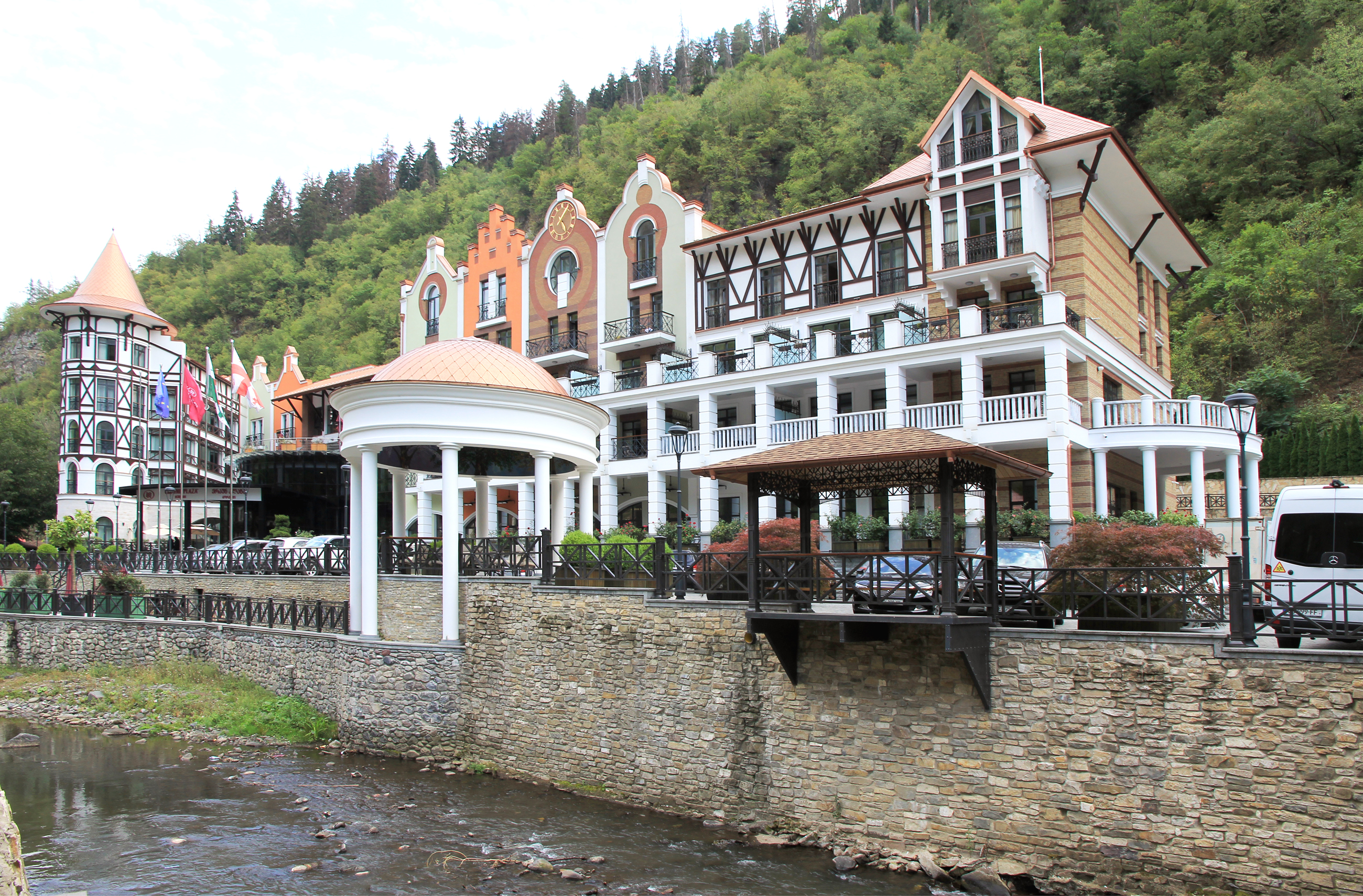
Spa Hotel in Borjomi near the Borjomi Central Park

In the Middle Ages, the area of what is now Borjomi was part of the Tori province. It was populated by a series of forts guarding the strategic crossroad of routes leading to the western, eastern, and southern provinces of Georgia. Three important forts – those of “Gogia”, “Petra”, and “Sali” – still overlook the town from nearby hills. From the 16th century into the 19th, the area belonged to the noble family of Avalishvili, but was largely depopulated as a result of Ottoman inroads.

After the Russian annexation of Georgia, the Borjomi area began to revitalize. The toponym Borjomi is first recorded in the 1810s. The town and its surroundings were placed under the Russian military authorities. Borjomi began receiving soldiers in the 1820s. Buildings and baths began going up in the 1830s. Early in the 1840s, when the Russian Viceroy of the Caucasus Yevgeny Golovin brought his daughter down to partake of the cure, he expedited the official transfer of the waters from the military to civil authorities. The viceroy Mikhail Vorontsov, fascinated by local landscape and mineral waters, made Borjomi his summer residence and refurnished it with new parks. Its warm climate, mineral water springs, and forests made Borjomi a favorite summer resort for the aristocracy, and gave it its popular name of "the pearl of Caucasus". In the 1860s, new hotels were built, and an administration for mineral waters was established. In 1871, Borjomi was bestowed upon the royal family member, Grand Duke Mikhail Nikolayvich, then the viceroy of the Caucasus. In the 1890s, Mikhail’s son, Nikolay, built a park and a chateau at Likani, at the western end of Borjomi. The bottled mineral waters began to be extensively exported. The town grew significantly at the expanse of Russian migrants and, in 1901, the number of ethnic Russian inhabitants (2,031) outstripped the native Georgians (1,424) for the first time.

Following the Red Army invasion of Georgia in 1921, the Soviet regime confiscated all aristocratic mansions and turned them into sanatoria, frequented by the Communist party elite. Despite significant damage caused by a flood on April 18, 1968, Borjomi continued to grow throughout the Soviet era. The post-Soviet years of political and economic crisis hindered development of the area, but it remained a popular destination for internal tourism. In the 2000s, a growing government and private investment into tourism and municipal infrastructure helped Borjomi recover from a decade of decay.

Borjomi, together with Bakuriani, was named by Georgia as an applicant city for the 2014 Winter Olympics on June 22, 2005, but it was eliminated as a candidate by the International Olympic Committee on June 22, 2006.

== Resort ==
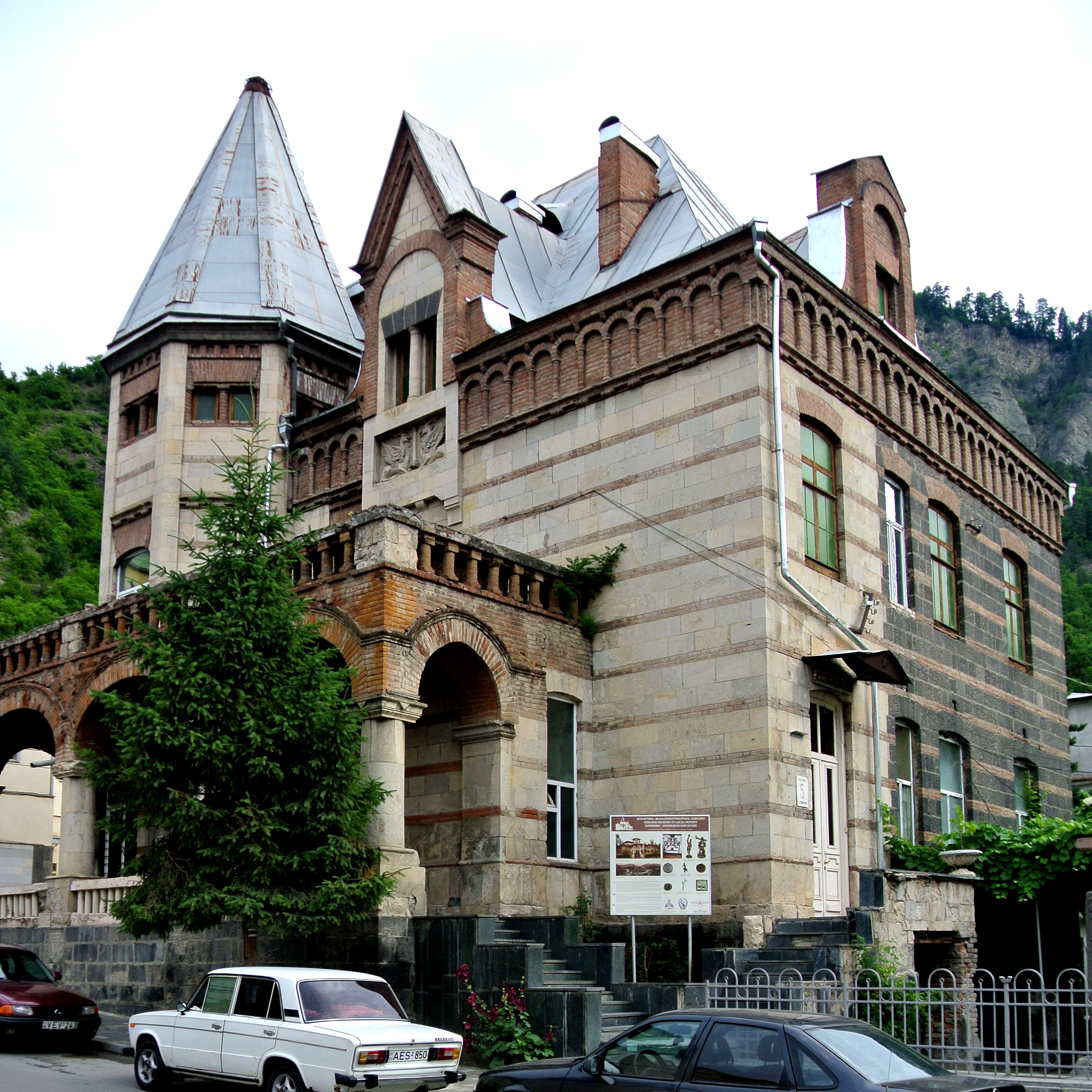
Borjomi Regional Museum

Borjomi is a balneological and climatic resort. During the Soviet times it had the status of a union resort. According to the relief and microclimate peculiarities Borjomi has several districts, of which Likani, Papa and Plateau are particularly favorable for treatment. The main treatment of the resort is mineral water used for drinking and balneological procedures.

Other treatment factors in Borjomi are climatotherapy, mud treatment and more. The best time for climatotherapy is June–October. Medical indications: chronic diseases of the gastrointestinal tract, liver and biliary tract, alteration of substances, some diseases of the cardiovascular system. The season lasts all year.

== Borjomi-Kharagauli National Park ==
The Borjomi-Kharagauli National Park administration, with offices, small hotel and visitors communication center are located at 23 Meskheti st, in Borjomi. The total area occupies 85,083 ha, which is more than 1% of the territory of Georgia. Borjomi-Kharagauli Protected Areas includes 6 districts – Borjomi, Kharagauli, Akhaltsikhe, Adigeni, Khashuri and Baghdati. There are administrative and visitors centers of the national park in Borjomi and Kharagauli. Borjomi Strict Nature Reserve, Borjomi-Kharagauli National Park, Nedzvi Managed Reserve and Goderdzi Petrified Forest Natural Monument are the protected areas and managed by the park administration.

Hiking, horse riding, biking, snow shoes, cultural and educational tours are also available in Borjomi-Kharagauli National Park tourist route network. The network amounts to 400–2,642 meters. The routes are provided with tourist shelters, picnic spots and camping sites.

== Railway services ==
Borjomi is home to a station on the Georgian Railway, as well as one terminal of its subsidiary, the Borjomi–Bakuriani railway. The Borjomi - Vale line has been defunct for decades, though the railway still remains in place. Borjomi Park serves as the last stop on the Khashuri - Vale spur and trains don't go further.

Preceding station	Georgian Railway	Following station
Borjomi Parki towards Vale	Khashuri – Vale	Kvibisi towards Khashuri
Currently Inactive, No Planned Reconstruction as of Yet Due to Lack of Funding
Terminus	Kukushka	Daba towards Bakuriani

== Geography ==
Borjomi is situated in the Borjomi Gorge at the eastern edge of the National Park.

=== Climate ===
Climate data for Borjomi (elev. 794m ASL) (1991–2020)
Month	Jan	Feb	Mar	Apr	May	Jun	Jul	Aug	Sep	Oct	Nov	Dec	Year
Record high °C (°F)	15.0 (59.0)	20.4 (68.7)	26.5 (79.7)	34.0 (93.2)	32.5 (90.5)	35.5 (95.9)	39.2 (102.6)	39.5 (103.1)	37.0 (98.6)	28.7 (83.7)	27.5 (81.5)	20.0 (68.0)	39.5 (103.1)
Mean daily maximum °C (°F)	4.9 (40.8)	7.0 (44.6)	12.2 (54.0)	17.3 (63.1)	21.6 (70.9)	25.8 (78.4)	28.4 (83.1)	29.5 (85.1)	24.5 (76.1)	19.0 (66.2)	11.3 (52.3)	6.2 (43.2)	17.3 (63.1)
Mean daily minimum °C (°F)	−4.1 (24.6)	−3.6 (25.5)	−0.1 (31.8)	4.0 (39.2)	8.9 (48.0)	12.8 (55.0)	15.8 (60.4)	15.4 (59.7)	11.2 (52.2)	6.4 (43.5)	0.8 (33.4)	−2.9 (26.8)	5.4 (41.7)
Record low °C (°F)	−17.6 (0.3)	−17.6 (0.3)	−13.0 (8.6)	−11.1 (12.0)	0.1 (32.2)	4.1 (39.4)	6.7 (44.1)	7.5 (45.5)	1.1 (34.0)	−4.1 (24.6)	−9.1 (15.6)	−16.8 (1.8)	−17.6 (0.3)
Average precipitation mm (inches)	37.2 (1.46)	35.0 (1.38)	49.3 (1.94)	54.4 (2.14)	91.7 (3.61)	66.1 (2.60)	46.0 (1.81)	39.5 (1.56)	51.0 (2.01)	61.9 (2.44)	57.5 (2.26)	37.9 (1.49)	627.5 (24.70)
Average precipitation days (≥ 1.0 mm)	7.9	7.1	9.8	9.8	13.3	10.1	6.8	6.5	7.1	8.5	8.4	7.3	102.6
Source: NOAA

== Notable people ==
- Nikolay Abramashvili (1918–1942), Soviet Air Forces fighter ace
- Nodar Kumaritashvili (1988–2010), one-man luger
- Otto Smik, DFC (1922–1944), Royal Air Force fighter ace

== See also ==
- Samtskhe-Javakheti
