= 2008 Borjomi wildfire =

Wildfire in Georgia

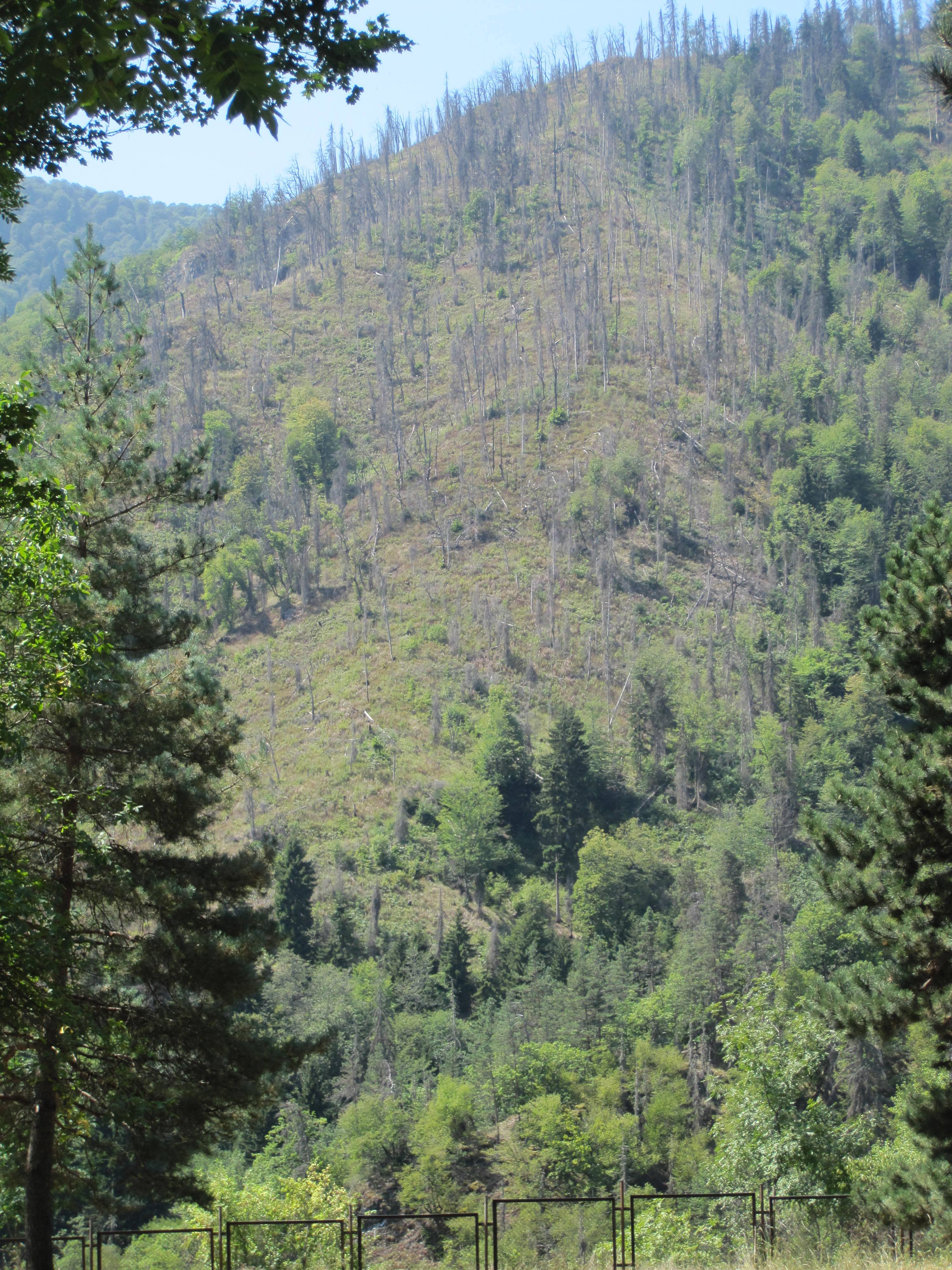
Consequences of the 2008 Borjomi wildfire still visible in August 2014.

The 2008 Borjomi wildfires started in the Borjomi Gorge, Georgia on August 15, 2008 and lasted for several days to come, destroying 250 hectares (620 acres) of the 75,000 hectares (190,000 acres) Borjomi-Kharagauli National Park, one of the largest national parks in Europe.

The fire started in the concluding days of the hostilities during the 2008 Russo-Georgian War, some 80 km far from the conflict area. Eyewitnesses reported camouflage-painted helicopters in the sky just before the fire erupted. Georgia accused Russia of bombing the area and deliberating starting a fire using incendiary devices, describing it as an ecocide. Russia's Defence Ministry denied bombing the forests and said that they would help the Georgians extinguish the fires if requested. Despite Turkish and Ukrainian aid, the firefighting efforts were complicated by the ongoing conflict and airspace restrictions.

According to the government of Georgia,

"the fire spread to over 950 hectares of forest land. An area of 250 hectares was totally destroyed, and 150 000 m³ of standing trees were lost. As a result, the forest's ecosystem lost its ecological function, as well as commercial value. In the affected area, endemic and other species were almost completely destroyed, including Himalayan yew, spruce, abies, pine, beech, oak, hornbeam and many varieties of forest wildlife.... The fauna of the region experienced significant damage as well."

The Borjomi wildfire alarmed international environmental organizations. The World Wide Fund for Nature (WWF) called on "all parties capable of helping put out forest fires in central Georgia to work together to extinguish them." The PAN Parks network, of which the Borjomi-Kharagauli National Park is a member, sent a latter to the Russian Minister of Natural Resources, expressing its concerns that the "recent bombing in Borjomi district resulted in a forest fire, which threatens Borjomi Kharagauli National Park." The World Bank expressed its "grave concern the reports of forest fires in the Borjomi area of Georgia" and sent an assessment team in the area. The Organization for Security and Co-operation in Europe-UNEP mission will also assess the damage caused by fire, including in the Borjomi-Kharagauli National Park and adjacent forested areas.
