= Borjomi Gorge =

Canyon in Georgia

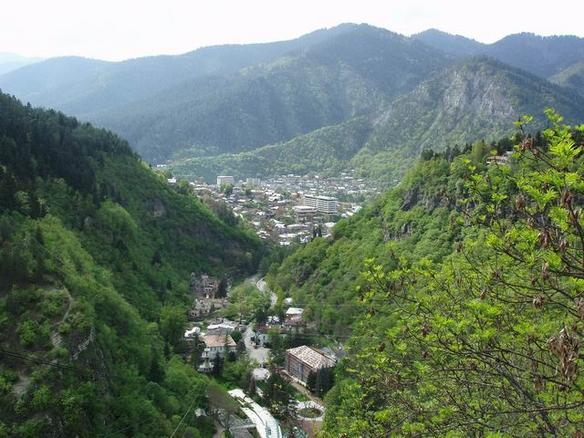

- Location within Samtskhe-Javakheti Location within Georgia

Naming
- Native name: ბორჯომის ხეობა (Georgian)

Geography
- Country: Georgia Georgia
- State/Province: Samtskhe-Javakheti
- Population center: Likani and Borjomi
- Coordinates: 41°50′53″N 43°24′36″E
- River: Kura River
- Interactive map of Borjomi Gorge

Borjomi Gorge (Georgian: ბორჯომის ხეობა) is a picturesque canyon of the Kura River in central Georgia. The gorge was formed as a result of the Kura River cutting its path through the Lesser Caucasus Mountains where the Trialeti and Meskheti Ranges meet. A significant portion of the Borjomi Gorge is covered by mixed and coniferous forests made up of oak, maple, beech, spruce, fir, and pine. A large portion of the Borjomi-Kharagauli National Park lies within the gorge, as well as the towns of Likani and Borjomi itself. The Baku–Tbilisi–Ceyhan pipeline cuts through a portion of the gorge.

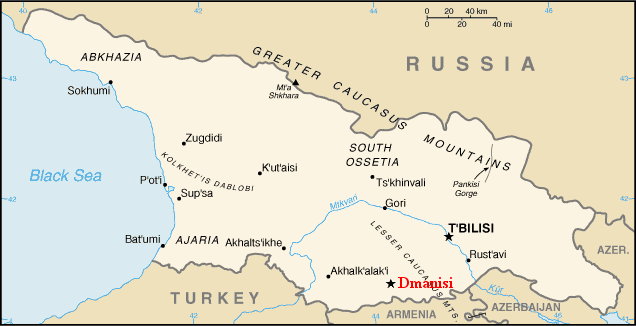
Map showing the Kura River flowing from Akhaltsikhe through Gori and Tbilisi

== History ==
Older books call it the Borzhom or Borjom Defile. Around the time of the Russo-Turkish War (1828–29) it was militarily important since it was the natural route southwest through the mountains from Russian-controlled Georgia to the Turkish Pashalik of Akhaltsikhe. It was guarded by a fort or castle called Atskhur.
