= Likani Villa =

Coordinates: 41.8280°N 43.3644°E

Romanov Palace
- Дворец Романовых; Georgian: რომანოვების სასახლე
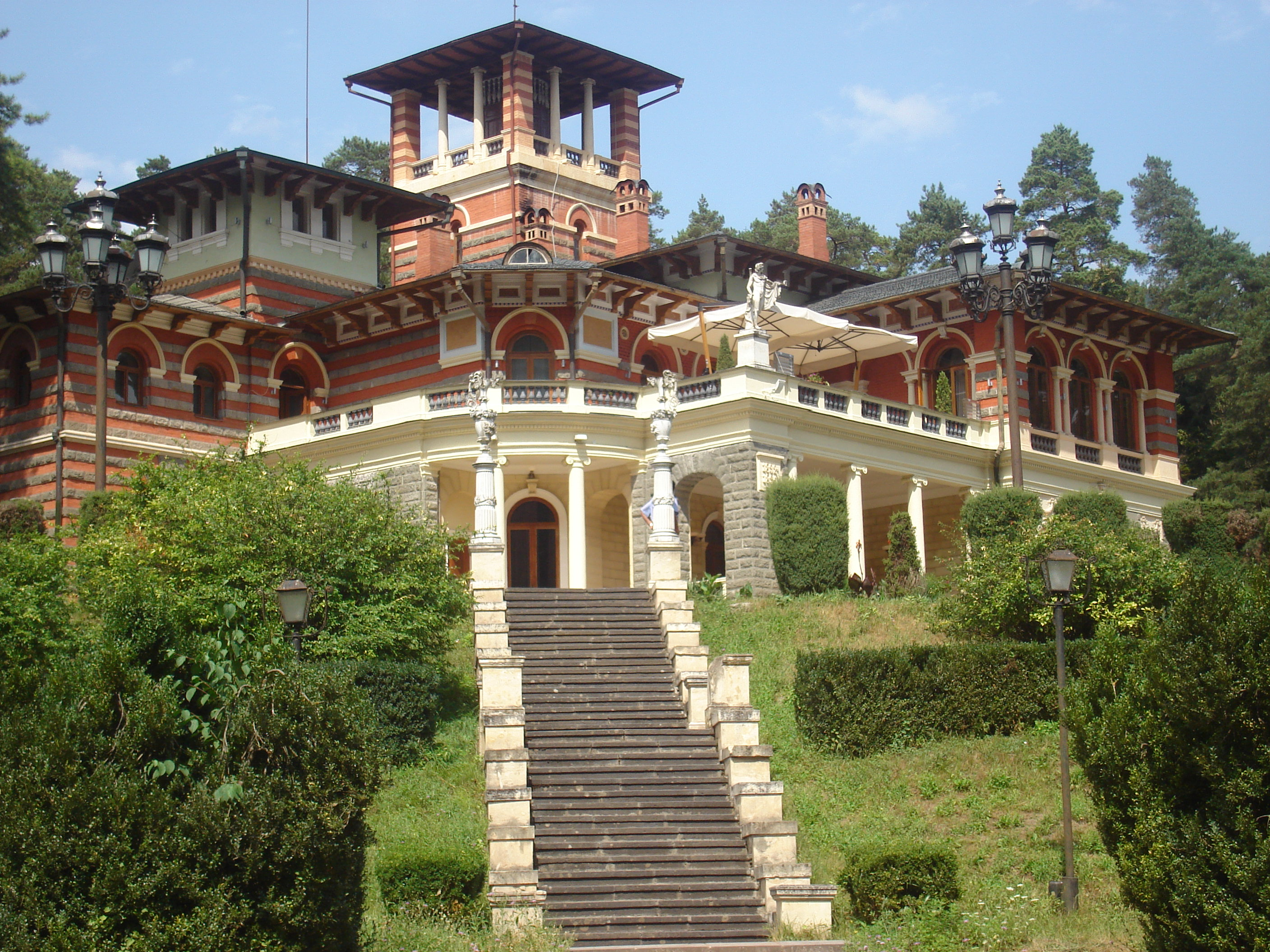
- Likani Palace
- Interactive map of the Romanov Palace area
- Alternative names: Likani Palace (Georgian: ლიკანის სასახლე)

General information
- Status: Museum and official residence
- Type: Palace
- Location: Likani, Georgia
- Current tenants: Summer residence of the President of Georgia
- Construction started: 1890s
- Completed: 1895–1898
- Owner: Government of Georgia

Technical details
- Floor area: 690 m²

Design and construction
- Architect: Leon Benois

Romanov Palace (Russian: Дворец Романовых; Georgian: რომანოვების სასახლე) also known as Likani Palace (Georgian: ლიკანის სასახლე), is a palace located in Likani, Georgia. The palace was designed by Leon Benois for Grand Duke Nicholas Mikhailovich of Russia.

The total area of Likani Palace is 690 square meters. The first hydroelectric power plant in the Russian Empire was built in 1898 in Likani to illuminate the palace. Next to Grand Duke Nicholas Mikhailovich of Russia lived the Grand Duke Georgy Nikolayevich, who suffered from tuberculosis. Images of the villa in the Romanov era are preserved in the photography of Sergei Prokudin-Gorsky. Part of the furniture of the private house is exhibited in the Georgian Museum of Simon Janashia.

During the USSR, the private house became the property of the state. The leaders of the Communist Party, including Joseph Stalin, rested here. Currently, the private house is the summer residence of the President of Georgia. A museum was opened here in 2016.
