= Borjomi Strict Nature Reserve =

Protected nature area in Georgia (country)

Borjomi Strict Nature Reserve Georgian: ბორჯომის ნაკრძალი
- IUCN category Ia (strict nature reserve)
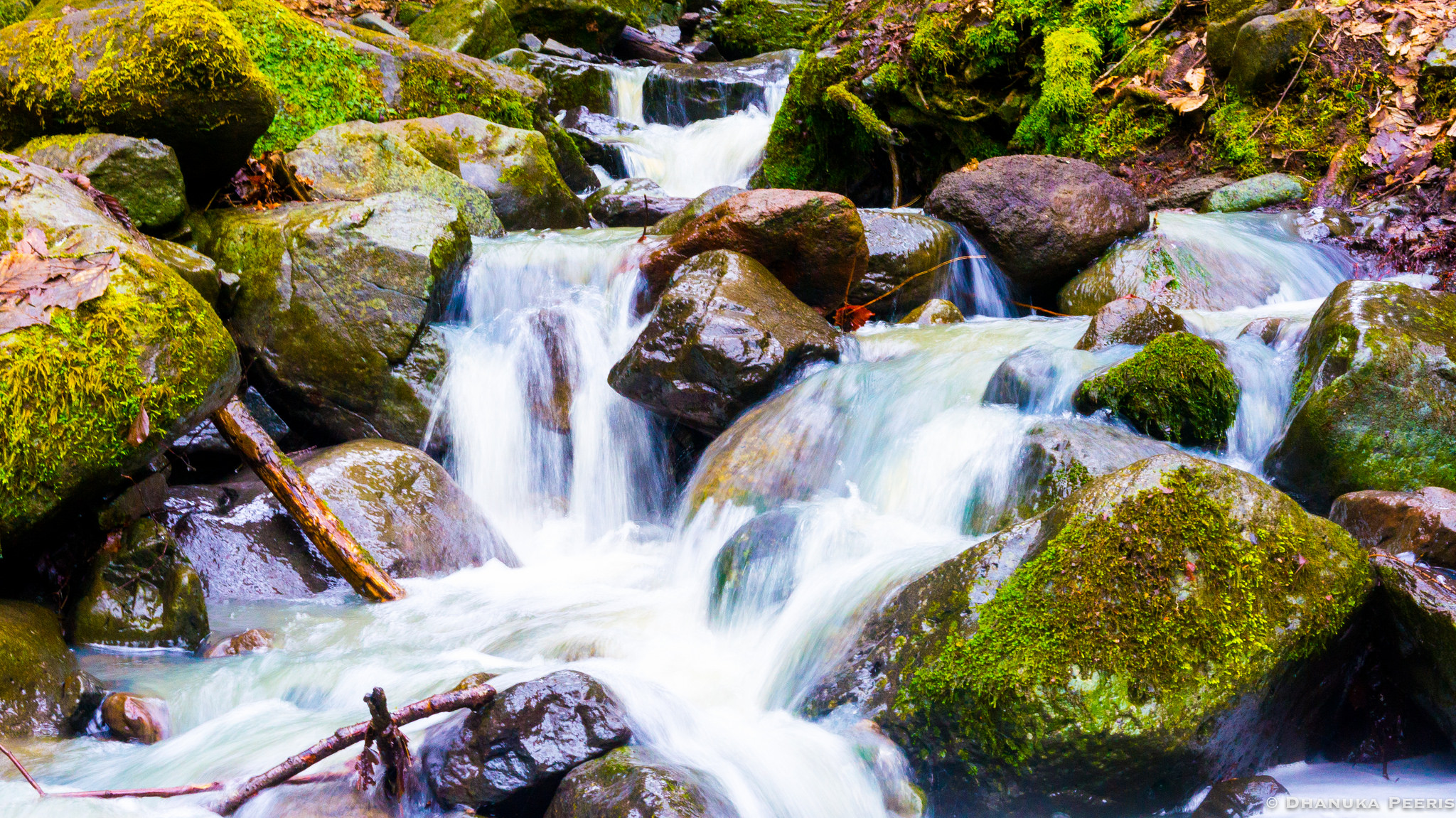
- Waterfall in Borjomi Nature Reserve

- Location within Georgia Location within Samtskhe-Javakheti
- Location: Georgia
- Nearest city: Borjomi
- Coordinates: 41°50′25″N 43°16′00″E
- Area: 237.5 km^{2} (91.7 sq mi)
- Established: 1929
- Governing body: Agency of Protected Areas
- Website: Borjomi-Kharagauli National Park Administration

Borjomi Strict Nature Reserve (Georgian: ბორჯომის ნაკრძალი) is a protected area in Borjomi Municipality, Samtskhe-Javakheti region of Georgia.

== Flora ==
The tallest tree of the region — Caucasian fir (Abies nordmanniana) grows in protected area and can be more than 50 m in height. It can be still higher in other locations with more moisture in western Caucasus and Abkhazia. Sessile oak (Quercus petraea), oriental hornbeam (Carpinus orientalis) and Scots pine (Pinus sylvestris) predominantly grow on dry southern slopes. The uppermost forest zone mainly occupied by Caucasian downy birch (Betula pubescens) and European rowan (Sorbus aucuparia). The forest floor is fairly clear.

== Fauna ==
Rare Caucasian Salamander (Mertensiella caucasica) habitat is protected at Borjomi Strict Nature Reserve.

== See also ==
- Borjomi-Kharagauli National Park
- Nedzvi Managed Reserve
- Goderdzi Petrified Forest Natural Monument
