= Nikolai Abramashvili =

Soviet fighter pilot (1918–1942)

Nikolai Georgievich Abramashvili
- Born: 28 December 1918; Akhaldaba, Georgia
- Died: 30 November 1942 (aged 23); Pitomnik Airfield, Stalingrad Oblast
- Military career
- Allegiance: Soviet Union
- Branch: Soviet Air Force
- Service years: 1937 – 1942
- Rank: Captain
- Unit: 13th Fighter Aviation Regiment
- Conflicts: World War II; Eastern Front; Battle of Stalingrad †
- Awards: Hero of the Russian Federation

Nikolai Georgievich Abramashvili (Georgian: ნიკოლოზ აბრამიშვილი Nikoloz Abramishvili, Russian: Николай Георгиевич Абрамашвили; 28 December 1918 – 30 November 1942) was a Soviet fighter ace who fought in World War II.

== Early life ==
Abramishvili was born on 30 December 1918 in the town of Borjomi, Georgia. He graduated after the 7th grade and was sent to studies on the Puskin gliding school near Moscow in Russia. When finishing his studies in 1937, he moved back to Borjomi as an instructor in the School of Gliding allied to the city's mineral bottling plant. In 1938 Amramishvili entered an aviation club in Gori and also enlisted to the Red Army which sent him to the Kachin Flight School. After graduating in 1940 he served in fighter regiments on the western Soviet border.

== War service ==
From the earliest days of the Great Patriotic War, Lieutenant Abramishvili fought on the North-Western Front as a member of the 440th and 3rd Guard Fighter Aviation Regiments and by the end of 1941 had flown more than 100 flight missions and claimed a total of 8 enemy aircraft shot down.

In the summer of 1942 he participated in the Battle of Stalingrad as part of the 273rd Fighter Regiment, flying the LaGG-3. In an air battle over the city Kalach, Abramishvili shot down two Messerschmitt Bf 109, but was hit himself, managing to bail out by parachute. Thereafter he managed to down another six enemy aircraft, becoming an ace with a total of 16 personal victories and 81 pair victories. Abramishvili is also credited with downing 11 enemy aircraft during a single air mission.

On 30 November 1942, during a fierce battle over Pitomnik Airfield, Captain Abramashvili's aircraft was hit by German fighter ace Oblt.Karl Kennel, Staffelkapitän of 5./Sch.G 1. Seriously wounded, but still in control of his damaged aircraft, his fellow wingmen reported he took deliberate aim on a group of German military equipment and after firing several bursts, he directly collided into a fuel dump. A series of explosions killed and injured a number of German personnel and several vehicles were destroyed or damaged nearby.

Different sources state that Abramashvili flew into a bridge which the enemy was about to cross with troops and tanks, causing serious damage.

== Honours and awards ==
For outstanding courage and heroism in the fight against fascism, Captain Nikolay Georgiyevich Abramashvili was posthumously awarded Hero of the Russian Federation in 1995. He was also awarded with the Red Banner earlier in 1942.

== See also ==
- List of Heroes of the Russian Federation
