= Goderdzi Petrified Forest Natural Monument =

Natural monument of petrified trees in Georgia

- IUCN category III (natural monument or feature)
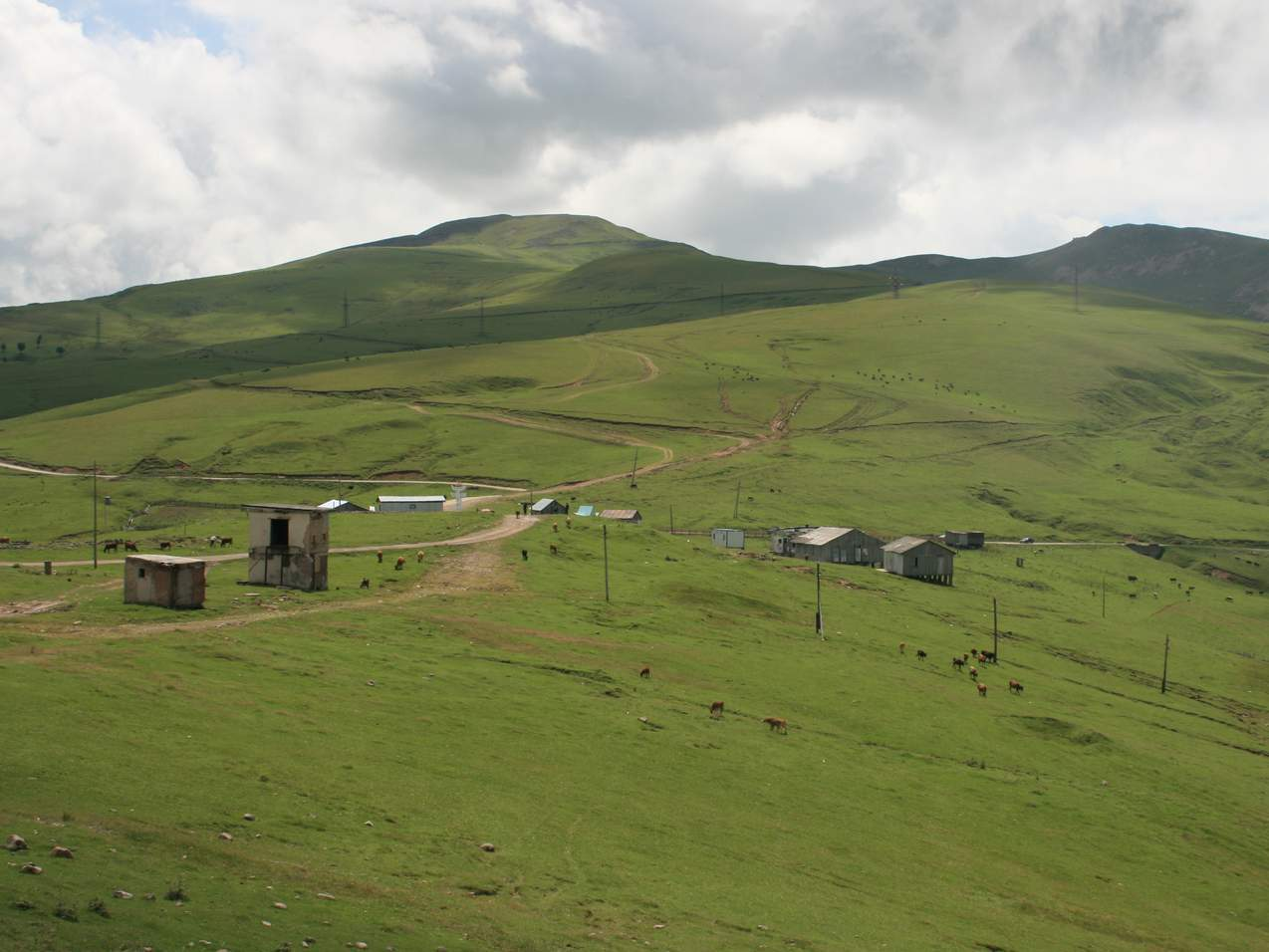
- Goderdzi Pass, Georgia

- Location within Georgia Location within Adjara
- Nearest city: village of Zarzma
- Coordinates: 41°38′39″N 42°30′22″E
- Area: 0.36 km^{2} (0.14 sq mi)
- Website: Godzerdzi Petrified Forest Natural Monument

The Goderdzi Petrified Forest Natural Monument (Georgian: გოდერძის ნამარხი ტყე) is a natural monument in Georgia.

== Status ==
This area is listed as a Natural Monument in the List of Protected Areas of Georgia. Together with the Borjomi Strict Nature Reserve, Borjomi-Kharagauli National Park and Nedzvi Managed Reserve it is one of four protected areas under same management authority.

== Geology and palaeontology ==
In the Tertiary period, volcanic eruptions and lahars caused a warm‐temperate, deciduous and subtropical forest to be preserved as fossils. Plant fossils from the Late Miocene - Early Pliocene forest are preserved as prints of semi-fossilized leaves in volcanic tuffs. Goderdzi fossil flora represents a varied paleo-botanical assemblages in the area, including more than 200 identified fossil plant species from 120 genera and 60 families. Logs are preserved by charcoal, opal-a, opal-ct, quartz and chalcedony in lahar flows and as standing trees that were inundated by volcaniclastic sediments during a lahar event. Fossil flora consists of three ecological groups: (1) subtropical flora, (2) warm‐temperate flora, and (3) temperate flora. Examples of the "Goderdzi Flora" are known from two localities, in the Adigeni and in the Khulo municipalities in the historical region of Meskheti. Petrified fossils are found in the valley of Dzindzistskali river, the right tributary of Kvabliani, on the eastern slope of Goderdzi Pass at an altitude of 1,600-2,100 m above sea level. This is one of the richest and well studied fossil floras.
