= Borjomi-Kharagauli National Park =

National park in Georgia

Borjomi-Kharagauli National Park Georgian: ბორჯომ-ხარაგაულის ეროვნული პარკი
- IUCN category II (national park)
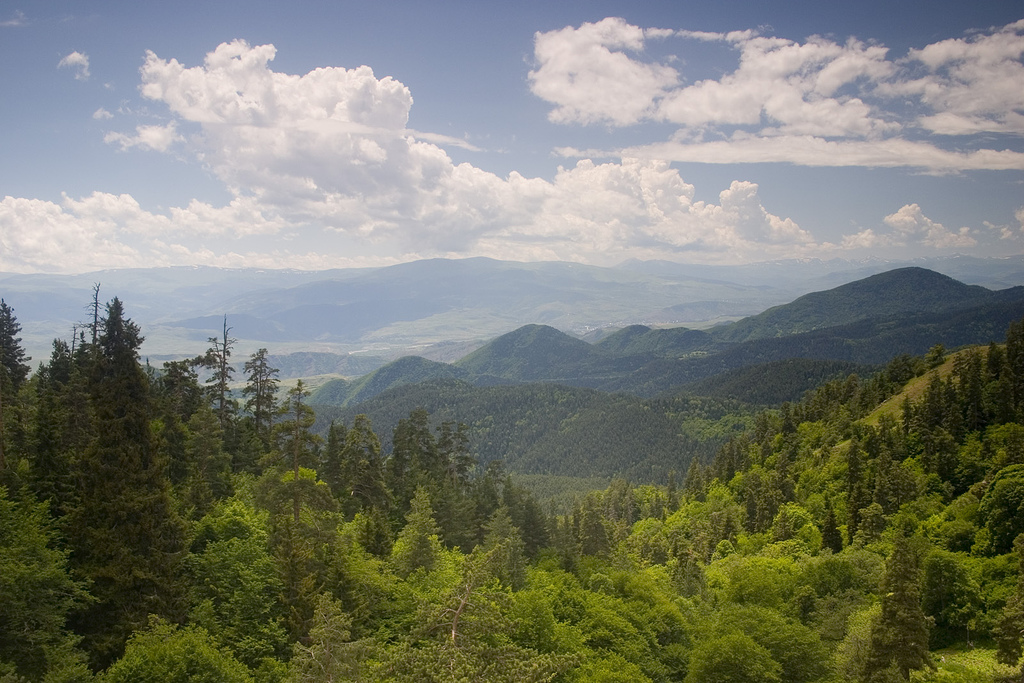
- Borjomi mountains.

- Location within Georgia Location within Samtskhe-Javakheti
- Location: Georgia
- Nearest city: Borjomi
- Coordinates: 41°51′N 43°10′E
- Area: 1,093.0 km^{2} (422.0 sq mi)
- Established: 1995
- Governing body: Agency of Protected Areas
- Website: www.borjomi-kharagauli-np.ge

The Borjomi-Kharagauli National Park (BKNP) (Georgian: ბორჯომ-ხარაგაულის ეროვნული პარკი, borjom-kharagaulis erovnuli parki) is a protected area in central Georgia, in Samtskhe-Javakheti, parts of Imereti and Shida Kartli situated in the Lesser Caucasus, southwest to the nation's capital of Tbilisi. Its ecoregion is that of the Caucasus mixed forests.

One of the largest national parks in Georgia, Borjomi-Kharagauli National Park includes six municipalities - Borjomi, Kharagauli, Akhaltsikhe, Adigeni, Khashuri and Baghdati - stretching from the resort of Borjomi to the town of Kharagauli. Together with adjacent Borjomi Nature Reserve, the total area is 851 square kilometres, i.e. more than 1% of the total territory of Georgia. The park was founded in 1995 and officially inaugurated in 2001.

Its particular uniqueness is diversity of geographical and ecological zones, landscapes, historical monuments and rich flora and fauna. The park has rapidly developing tourist infrastructure.

== History ==
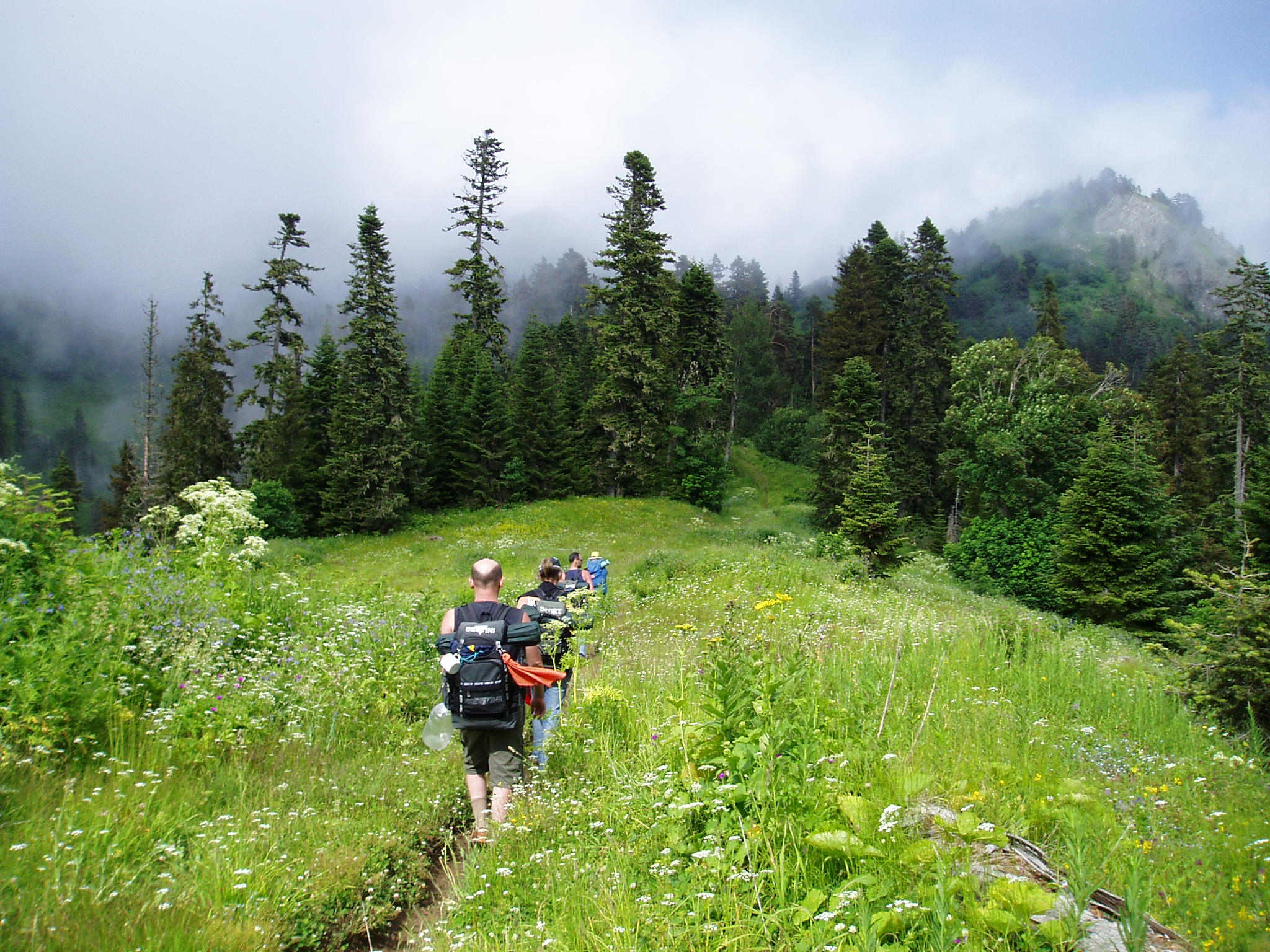
Borjomi-Kharagauli National Park

The history of the park dates back to Medieval times when it was used primarily by the local aristocracy for hunting.

When Georgia lost its independence and became part of the Russian Empire, the Grand Duke Michael Nicolaievich was given the post of Governor General of Transcaucasia. He found the local beauty of the Borjomi park so impressive he decided to build his personal summer residence there.

Noticeable changes to the park came when the Grand Duke Michael restricted any lumbering or hunting without permission, thus laying the foundation for the park's future.

In 1995, the Borjomi-Kharagauli National Park was endorsed and created with the support of the World Wildlife Fund and the German government, and was officially inaugurated in 2001.

== Environmental Concerns ==
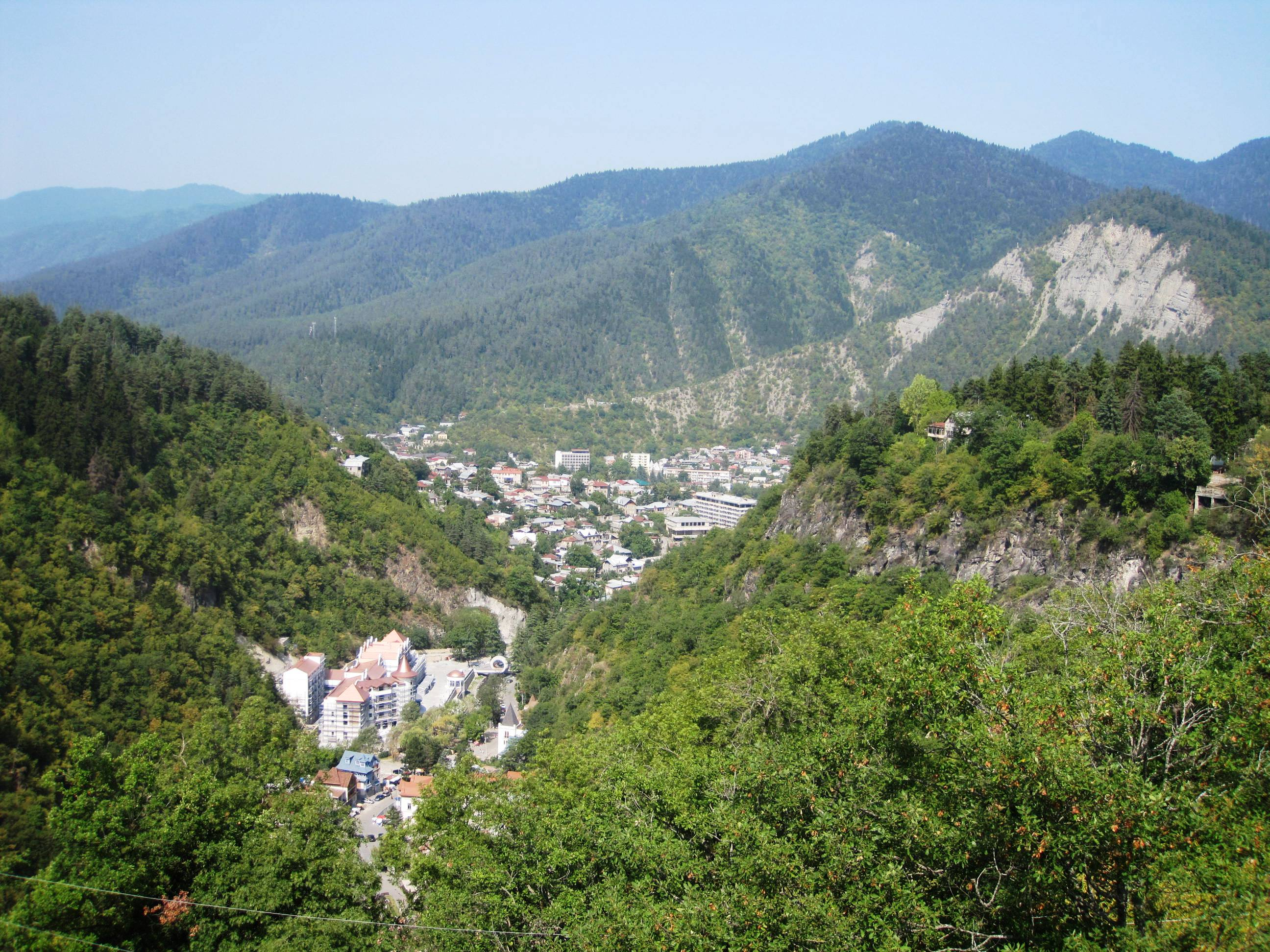
Borjomi-Kharagauli National Park near resort Borjomi.

The Baku–Tbilisi–Ceyhan pipeline skirts the edge of this National Park and crosses its watershed. The decision to run the BTC Pipeline near this pristine region drew considerable ire from environmental groups who allege that a leak could disrupt the Borjomi ecosystem. These groups also point out that the area is a source of frequent landslides that could increase the chance of a breach of the pipeline. They also allege that simply building a pipeline in this region will have a negative effect on sales of Borjomi mineral water. Mineral water makes up a significant portion of Georgia exports. In August 2008, more than three square kilometres of forest in the park were burnt in what Georgia claimed was an ecocide by Russia.

== See also ==
- Tusheti National Park
- Borjomi Strict Nature Reserve
- Nedzvi Managed Reserve
- Goderdzi Petrified Forest Natural Monument
