= Nedzvi Managed Reserve =

Protected nature area in Georgia

- Georgian: ნეძვის აღკვეთილი
- IUCN category IV (habitat/species management area)
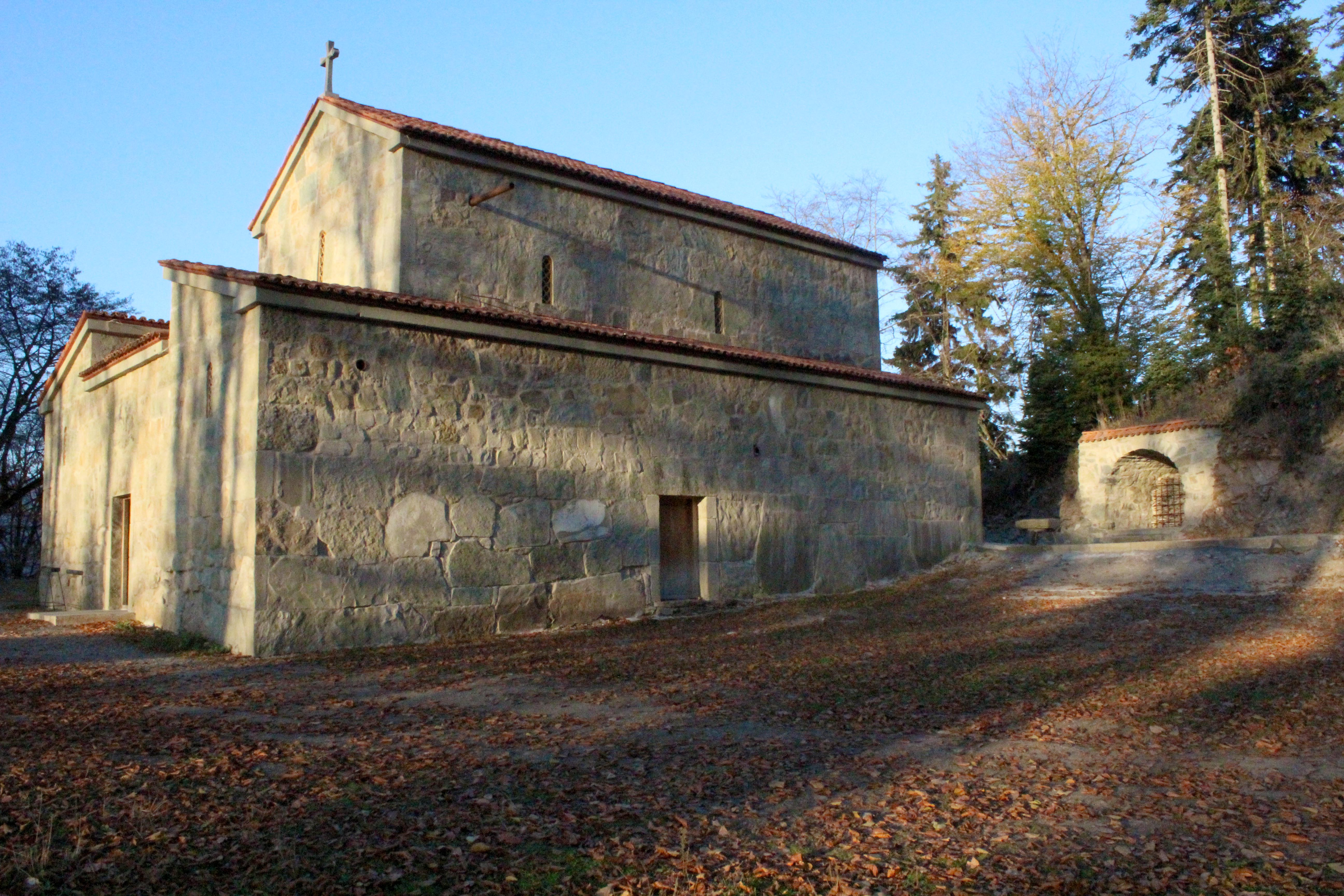
- Photoleti church at Akhaldaba village.

- Location within Georgia Location within Samtskhe-Javakheti
- Coordinates: 41°52′53.3″N 43°30′51.0″E
- Area: 22,219 acres (89.92 km^{2})
- Established: 1995
- Governing body: Agency of Protected Areas
- Website: www.borjomi-kharagauli-np.ge

Nedzvi Managed Reserve (Georgian: ნეძვის აღკვეთილი) is a protected area in central Georgia, in Samtskhe-Javakheti situated in the Lesser Caucasus, southwest to the nation's capital of Tbilisi in Borjomi Municipality. Nedzvi Managed Reserve along with Borjomi Strict Nature Reserve, Borjomi-Kharagauli National Park and Goderdzi Petrified Forest Natural Monument is one of four protected areas under same management authority. The accurate size and borders of the protected areas has yet to be determined. Its ecoregion is that of the Caucasus mixed forests.

== Cultural heritage ==
There are several early Christian churches in Nedzvi area dated back to 9th century. The Georgian Orthodox Church, originally part of the Church of Antioch, gained its autocephaly and developed its doctrinal specificity progressively between the 5th and 10th centuries. Church Nedzvi located in gorge of the river Nedzvishevi is a monument of this period. It is dated to the mid-9th century. It was built by disciples of Gregory of Khandzta and Christopher, the builder of the Dviri Monastery of Saint Cyricus.

After the two restorations of the monument in 20th century in 1948 and in 1962, the original layout of the church was revealed. It was established that Nedzvi is the largest among existing famous three-church basilicas in Georgia.

== See also ==
- Borjomi-Kharagauli National Park
- Borjomi Strict Nature Reserve
- Goderdzi Petrified Forest Natural Monument
