= Likani =

Coordinates: 41°50′N 43°22′E

Likani ლიკანი
- Town
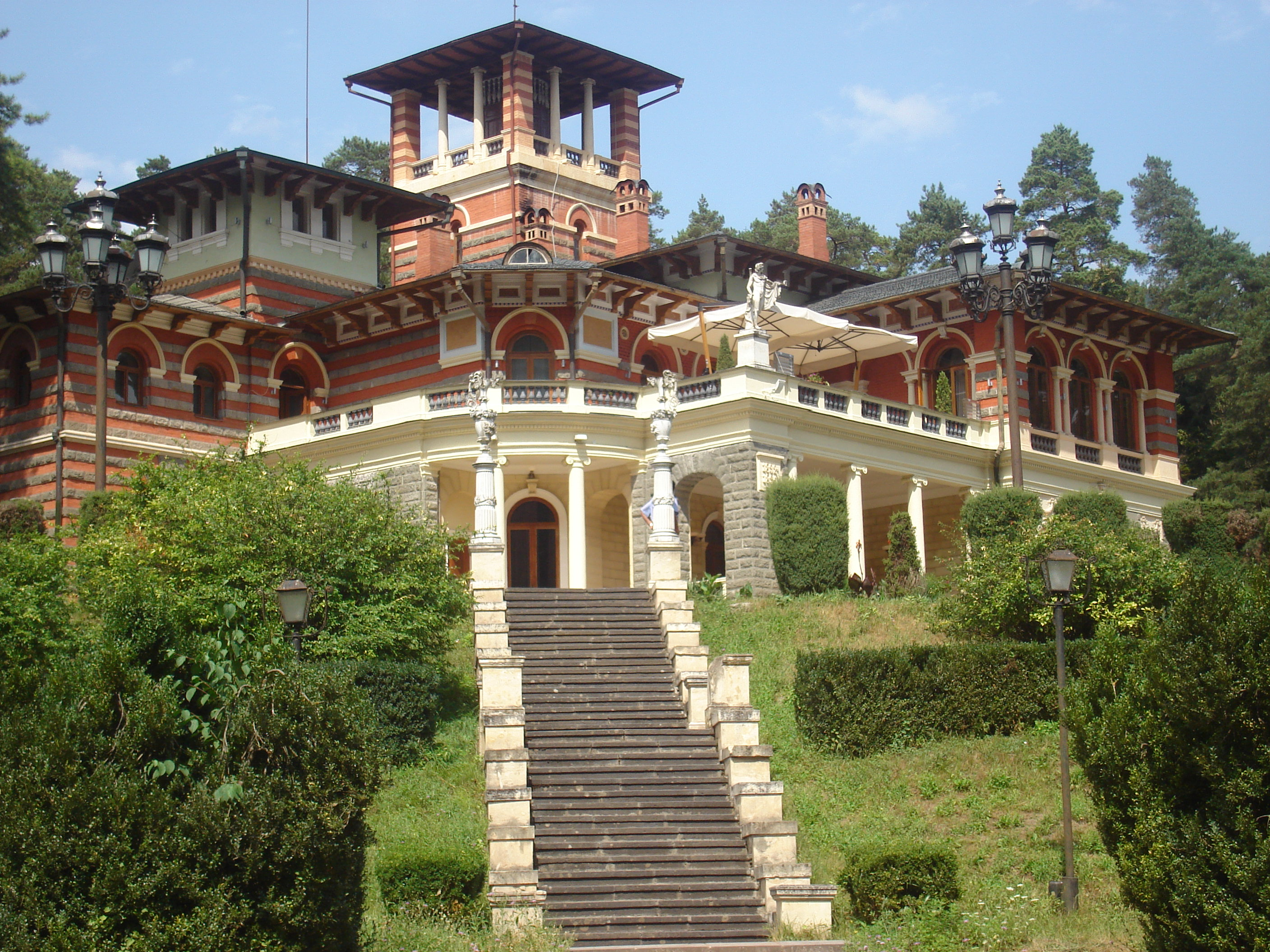
- Likani Palace
- Interactive map of Likani
- Country: Georgia
- Region: Samtskhe-Javakheti
- District: Borjomi
- Time zone: UTC+4 (Georgian Time)

Likani (Georgian: ლიკანი [likʼän̪i]) is a townlet in Georgia’s Samtskhe-Javakheti region, located at the west end of the town of Borjomi in the Borjomi Municipality, some 160 km west of Tbilisi, capital of Georgia. Likani is adjacent to the Borjomi-Kharagauli National Park and is a popular mountain spa.

Winters are mild and not very snowy with an average temperature of -2.0 °C while summers are warm with an average temperature of 20-25 °C. The Likani Park, popularly exploited as a recreational zone, is dominated by oaks and conifer groves and hosts mineral springs similar in composition to "Borjomi".

Important landmarks include a three-nave basilica church (8th-9th centuries) and the Romanov Palace (1892-95). The latter – projected by Leon Benois and designed by Leopold Bilfeldt – was built on the bank of the Kura River as a summer mansion of Grand Duke Nicholas Mikhailovich of Russia. In the Soviet times, the Likani residence passed into the property of the state and was frequented by key Soviet officials, including Joseph Stalin. In a newly independent Georgia, the palace functions as a summer residence of the President of Georgia. The rest of the Likani recreational complex, including a Soviet-era sanatorium, was purchased, in April 2006, by the Kazakh state-owned energy company KazMunayGas which promised to develop the area into an international tourism center.

== See also ==
- Samtskhe-Javakheti
