= KhramGESStroy =

Soviet hydroelectric construction trust in the Georgian SSR

- трест «Храмгэсстрой»
- Successor: GruzGidroStroy
- Formation: 1935 or 1936 (reported); active by 1938
- Defunct: 1951
- Type: Hydroelectric construction trust
- Headquarters: Tbilisi, Georgian Soviet Socialist Republic, Soviet Union
- Region served: Georgian SSR
- Fields: Hydroelectric, hydraulic-engineering and power-transmission construction
- Manager: Vakhtang Chankotadze
- Parent organization: Ministry of Power Stations (post-war period)
- Award: Order of Lenin (1948)

KhramGESStroy (Russian: трест «Храмгэсстрой»; Georgian: ხრამჰესმშენი), also rendered Khram GESStroy, was a Soviet hydroelectric construction trust headquartered in Tbilisi, in the Georgian SSR. A 1953 English-language intelligence report referred to it as the Khram Hydroelectric Power Station Construction Trust. It operated from the second half of the 1930s until 1951. Its initial purpose was to construct the Khrami I hydroelectric power station and the Tsalka Reservoir, and it later worked on other hydroelectric, irrigation and power-transmission projects. Its documented activities included the Sukhumi Hydroelectric Power Station, the Upper Samgori irrigation and energy system, the Sioni Reservoir, the Ortachala Hydroelectric Power Station, transmission lines and substations, as well as the wartime restoration of the Baksan Hydroelectric Power Station.

KhramGESStroy was awarded the Order of Lenin in 1948 for the construction and commissioning of the first stage of Khrami I. In 1951 it was succeeded by GruzGidroEnergoStroy, also known as GruzGidroStroy, which continued work on projects begun by KhramGESStroy.

== History ==
=== Origins and the Khrami project ===
Plans for a hydroelectric power station on the Khrami predated the first known references to the trust. In March 1930, engineer Ya. Melkumov listed Khrami among the power stations then proposed for construction in Transcaucasia. The article concerned the proposed project and does not establish that KhramGESStroy already existed at that date.

The trust's exact date of formation is not known. A declassified 1953 Central Intelligence Agency information report stated that it had been established in 1935 or 1936, while marking its appraisal of the report's contents as tentative. Contemporary Soviet sources establish that the trust was active no later than 1938: a 1939 account reported its performance against the 1938 construction plan, and a later biographical notice stated that engineer Alexander Mikaberidze joined the trust in 1938.

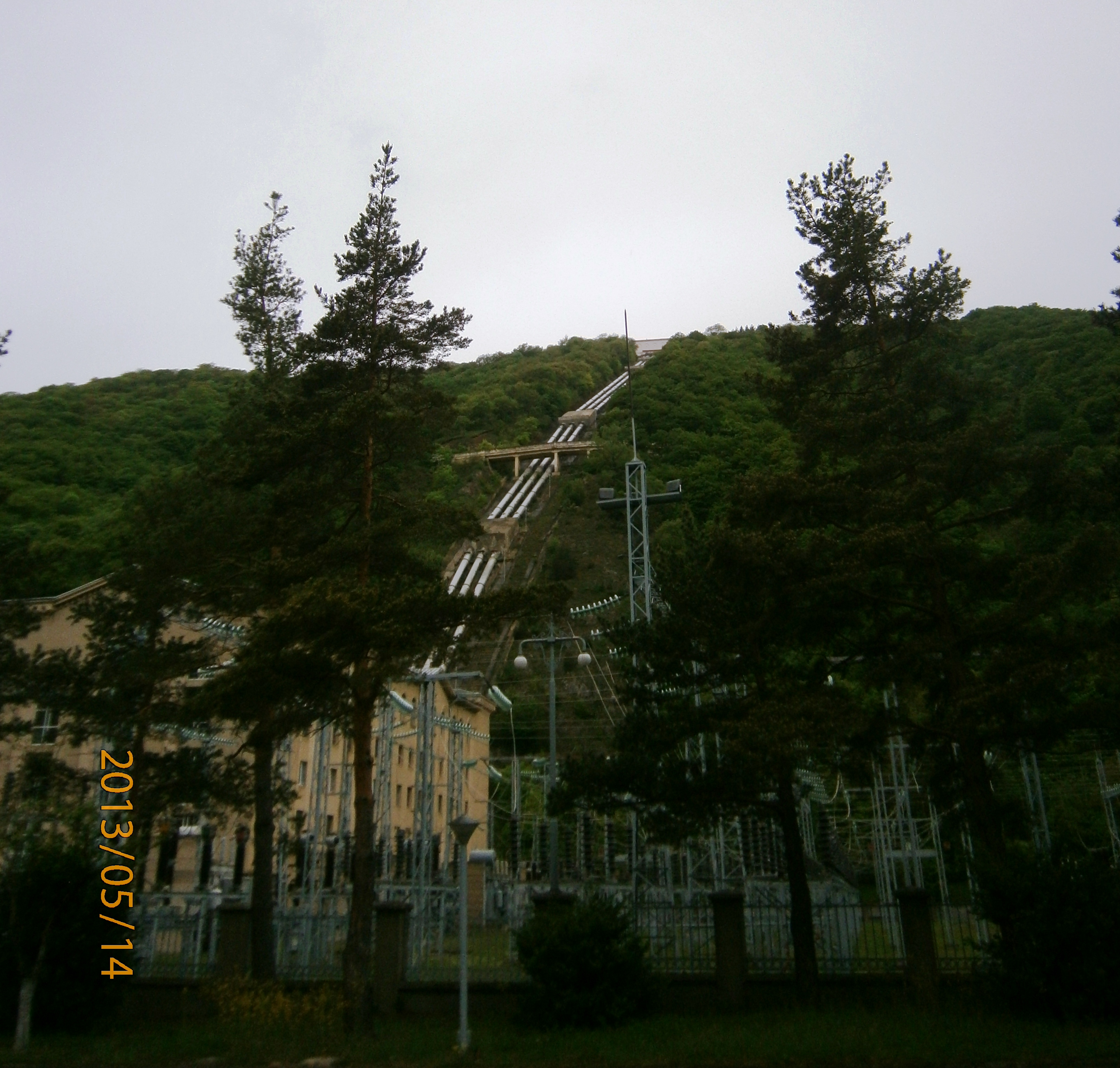
Khramhesi in 2013

The trust's initial principal task was to build a high-head regulating hydroelectric station on the Khrami and a reservoir in the Tsalka basin. The scheme called for a dam in the canyon above the village of Barmaksiz, a reservoir with a planned capacity of up to 500 million cubic metres (about 405,000 acre-feet), a pressure tunnel and penstocks producing a design head of up to 450 metres (1,480 ft). By mid-1939, temporary workers' settlements had been built, dam construction was under way, the tunnel had been driven for its full length, and part of it had received a reinforced-concrete lining.

KhramGESStroy also built roads, production facilities and workers' housing required by the project. Its head office was in Tbilisi; a 1941 recruitment notice gave the address as 18 Korganovskaya Street. The trust also maintained a separate motor-transport depot in Saburtalo.

=== Wartime and post-war work ===
In 1943, KhramGESStroy included an administration responsible for restoring the Baksan Hydroelectric Power Station in the North Caucasus. The catalogue of the State Archive of Stavropol Krai records orders issued by that administration, minutes of technical meetings and a KhramGESStroy report on restoration work at the station.

Construction at Khrami accelerated after the war. By early 1947, the main civil works were approaching completion: grouting and shotcreting were being carried out in the pressure tunnel, the water conduit and powerhouse complex were under construction, and the penstock and generating equipment were being installed. At the same time, the trust built an access road, the double-circuit Khrami–Didube–ZAGES transmission system, and the Bolshoy Didube ("Greater Didube") step-down substation, which was intended to connect the station to the power system and supply Tbilisi.

KhramGESStroy was not the sole contractor for the complex. The specialist organisations Gidromontazh and Spetsgidroenergomontazh installed metal structures and much of the principal hydroelectric equipment, while KhramGESStroy carried out the main civil and hydraulic-engineering works and constructed tunnels, conduits, the powerhouse complex, roads, transmission lines and substations.

The first generating unit of Khrami I was commissioned in late December 1947. The Bolshoy Didube substation entered service at the same time, allowing electricity from the station to reach the Tbilisi network. During 1948, the trust continued work on the second circuit of the transmission line and further development of the Didube substation. By 15 January 1949, two generating units were operating and the third was expected to be commissioned within several months. The second unit increased the supply of electricity to the Gruzenergo system by 20 per cent.

=== Supporting infrastructure and housing ===
The Dashbash Hydroelectric Power Station supplied the construction site's own power requirements; hydraulic engineer A. Shestunov supervised its installation. The settlement of Molotovo served as a base for the builders in the Tsalka district and contained workers' housing, a workers' club and a nursery.

The trust's units in Tbilisi included a construction office, a high-voltage network construction administration and the motor-transport depot in Saburtalo, whose address was given in 1944 as 44 Kombaina Street. An administration for the construction of factories for KhramGESStroy and the Ministry of Power Stations operated at Navtlugi-2 under the abbreviated name Khramzavodstroy.

KhramGESStroy also undertook residential construction. In 1950 it was one of several organisations building five-storey apartment blocks on Maris Street in Vake. A trade-union report published that September stated that, although the trust had substantially exceeded its overall post-war housing target, it had failed to meet its 1950 programme; the report attributed the delay to late preparation of designs and estimates, limited use of machinery and worker downtime.

=== Expansion beyond Khrami ===
The personnel and equipment assembled at Khrami were subsequently deployed to other projects. KhramGESStroy participated in construction of the Sukhumi Hydroelectric Power Station, whose first stage had entered service by October 1948. A 1951 account described the Khrami and Sukhumi stations as the foundation of the trust's accumulated construction experience.

From 1948 onward, a substantial part of the workforce was transferred to the Upper Samgori irrigation and energy system. The trust was assigned the headworks and tunnels of the Upper Main Canal, together with works associated with three planned hydroelectric stations identified as the Martkopi and Satkhenisi stations and a third station called Tatriskhevskaya in the 1949 Russian-language source. The latter is now known as the Tetrikhevi HPP. A new construction administration, SamgoriGESStroy, was formed at a base in Ujarma, with former Khrami builders making up its core workforce.

In late 1950, the Soviet government assigned KhramGESStroy to construct the Sioni Reservoir, which was intended to provide a reliable water supply for the Samgori system. Preparatory work—including an access road, transfer of earth-moving machinery, utility provision and builders' housing—began before the formally scheduled start date of 1 January 1951.

In autumn 1950, the trust also began construction of the Ortachala Hydroelectric Power Station on the Kura in Tbilisi. By January 1951, cofferdams had been erected and concrete placement in the dam had begun.

=== Reorganisation ===
In 1951, KhramGESStroy was succeeded by GruzGidroEnergoStroy, which was also referred to as GruzGidroStroy. On 13 April 1951, Zarya Vostoka described it as "the GruzGidroEnergoStroy trust, formerly KhramGESStroy" and listed the Sioni Reservoir and Ortachala station among its current projects.

The administrative history of a subordinate design office records the transition during the same year. The office remained under KhramGESStroy until 30 April 1951 and, after an interim period, entered the system of the trust საქჰიდროენერგომშენი on 10 July. The declassified American report characterised the change as the abolition of KhramGESStroy and the creation of GruzGidroStroy in its place. Because the sources use differing terminology, the precise legal mechanism of the reorganisation is unclear.

== Organisation and leadership ==
In the post-war period, the trust operated within the system of the Ministry of Power Stations. A separate design and cost-estimating office was established on 18 June 1947 and later reorganised as a design office; its records are held by the National Archives of Georgia.

According to the Georgian Biographical Dictionary of the National Parliamentary Library of Georgia, engineer Giorgi Chogovadze headed construction of Khrami I from 1935, led construction of the Sukhumi station in 1940–1943, and became a deputy manager of KhramGESStroy in 1944. In a 1939 newspaper article, engineer G. Vergeles was described more broadly as "director of the hydraulic complexes under construction in the Khrami River area". The available sources do not explain the relationship between Chogovadze's and Vergeles's responsibilities.

During the second half of the 1940s, Vakhtang Chankotadze headed the Khrami construction project and managed the trust. Aron Gindin was its chief engineer, while Vissarion Eristov headed the construction project's technical department. Alexander Mikaberidze directed construction of the Khrami–Didube–ZAGES transmission line.

== Awards and recognition ==
By a decree of the Presidium of the Supreme Soviet of the Soviet Union dated 27 April 1948, KhramGESStroy was awarded the Order of Lenin for successfully constructing and commissioning the first stage of the high-head regulating Khrami Hydroelectric Power Station. The order was presented to the trust's workforce on 4 July 1948 at Molotovo in the Tsalka district.

The same decree awarded orders and medals to construction personnel; 177 people received decorations at the 4 July ceremony. Recipients of the Order of Lenin included trust manager Vakhtang Chankotadze, chief engineer Aron Gindin, tunnel-section head Nikolai Makarevich, and several foremen and specialists.

Among KhramGESStroy employees decorated for the Sukhumi project under a decree of 26 March 1949, electrical-installation section head P. G. Meskhishvili received the Order of the Red Banner of Labour, while works superintendent A. M. Sharygin received the Order of the Badge of Honour. By April 1951, a group of builders and designers of the Khrami station had also been awarded a Stalin Prize.

== See also ==
- Khramhesi
- Khrami Hydroelectric Power Station
- Baksan Hydroelectric Power Station
- Tetrikhevi HPP
- List of power stations in Georgia (country)
