= Khrami Hydroelectric Power Station =

Hydroelectric power plants on the Khrami River near Tsalka, Georgia

Khrami
- Location within Georgia
- Location: Khrami, Georgia
- Coordinates: 41°37′17″N 44°03′21″E
- Type: reservoir
- Basin countries: Georgia

Khrami Hydro Power Cascades (ხრამის ჰიდროელექტროსადგურების კასკადი) consists of large power plants in Georgia, It serves as the nation's main regulatory power plant, consisting of 2 individual Dams that work independently, and it is located on river Khrami near the town of Tsalka, Construction of the first of two Hydropower plants “Khramhes I” began in 1938 and began exploitation in late 1947, for “KhramhesII” it was finished in 1963 and went in exploitation, the main substation was constructed in valley were old headstart of the river Khrami was. Both plants are located in the municipality of Tsalka, near town of Khramhesi. Power output Cascade is 110 Thousand 110 Kw

== See also ==
- List of power stations in Georgia (country)
- Energy in Georgia (country)
