= Trialeti (town) =

Trialeti თრიალეთი
- Borough
- Interactive map of Trialeti
- Location within Georgia
- Coordinates: 41°32′36″N 44°06′37″E
- Country: Georgia
- Region: Kvemo Kartli
- Municipality: Tsalka

Population
  - Estimate (2023): 656
- Time zone: UTC+4 (Georgian Time)

Trialeti (Georgian: თრიალეთი) is a daba in Tsalka Municipality in the Kvemo Kartli region of Georgia. It is located on the Chochiani Plateau, above the right bank of the Khrami river, 1,500 m (4,900 ft) above sea level and 7 km (4.3 mi) from the municipal center Tsalka. The Tetritskaro-Tsalka regional road passes through Trialeti.

== History ==
Trialeti was founded in 1857 as Alexandergilf when refugee South German Protestants settled here. In 1815, Emperor Alexander I had given permission for the settlement of these religiously persecuted Germans in the Caucasus. In Georgia, they settled mainly in Tbilisi and the Kvemo Kartli region. In 1921, the town was renamed Rosenberg and in 1941, the name was changed to Molotov. This happened after the invasion of Nazi Germany in the Soviet Union and the Caucasus Germans were deported to the east by the Soviets.

In 1944, the town was given the status of a daba, and in 1957, it was given its current name Trialeti. Due to this history, Trialeti has a mix of traditional German and Georgian architecture. The only existing church in the village, which was restored in 2017, is Evangelical Lutheran in origin, and was originally built in 1906.

== Demographics ==
In 2023, Trialeti had 656 inhabitants, a growth of over 16% since the 2014 census. According to this census, the population consisted mainly of Georgians (82%), Armenians (10%) and Pontic Greeks (6%).

Year	1959	1970	1979	1989	2002	2014	2020	2023
Population	7591	1617	1435	1239	322	565	615	656
Accountability data: (Note: The 2014 census found an unexplained gap compared to the data from the national statistical agency Geostat. UN-supervised research has found that the 2002 census was overstated by about 8-9 percent. See, "1. Introduction", Page 1.)
