= Sameba =

Sameba may refer to:

- Holy Trinity Cathedral of Tbilisi
- Sameba, Georgia, a village on Madatapa Lake
