= Vissarion Sardionovich Eristov =

Soviet hydraulic engineer and construction manager

Vissarion Eristov
- Born: February 6, 1905; Tbilisi, Tiflis Governorate, Russian Empire
- Died: November 11, 1975 (aged 70); Moscow, Russian SFSR, Soviet Union
- Education: Leningrad Institute of Railway Engineers (1928)
- Known for: Construction of major Soviet hydroelectric power stations
- Awards: Honored Builder of the RSFSR (1970)
- Scientific career
- Fields: Hydraulic engineering, underground hydraulic structures, construction management
- Workplaces: Dneprostroi; Lengidroproekt; Tbilgidroenergoproekt; KhramGESStroy; Gruzgidroenergostroy; Novosibirskgesstroy; Ministry of Power Stations of the USSR; Moscow State University of Civil Engineering (MISI)

Vissarion Sardionovich Eristov (Russian: Виссарио́н Сардио́нович Эри́стов); 6 February 1905 – 11 November 1975) was a Soviet hydraulic engineer, construction manager, and a leading specialist in the field of hydraulic structures, particularly underground facilities. He held the academic title of Doctor of Technical Sciences (1968) and was a Professor (1963). Eristov was a recipient of the Stalin Prize (second degree, 1951) and was named an Honored Builder of the RSFSR (1970).

== Biography ==
=== Early life and career ===
Vissarion Eristov was born on 6 February 1905 in Tbilisi to a family of medical professionals; his father was a pharmacist, and his mother, Aleksandra Grigoryevna Fyodorova, was a paramedic. During his childhood, he moved with his mother to St. Petersburg, where he graduated from the 1st Gymnasium (later renamed the 9th Labor School).

In 1928, he graduated from the Faculty of Waterways at the Leningrad Institute of Railway Engineers. After graduation, he was conscripted into the Red Army, where he trained as an artillery officer and served in an anti-aircraft unit.

His professional career began in 1929 in the design department of the Dneprostroi construction authority. He later participated in the construction of the Rioni Hydroelectric Power Station. From 1934, he worked as the deputy head of the Middle Volga HPPs department at the Lengidroproekt institute, while also teaching at the M. I. Kalinin Leningrad Polytechnic Institute. In 1936, he was appointed head of the Khrami HPPs department at the Tbilgidroenergoproekt institute, and in 1938, he became the deputy chief engineer and head of the technical department for the construction of the Khrami HPP-1.

=== World War II ===
From the first days of the Great Patriotic War, Eristov served in the active army. He was in the artillery from 1941 to 1944, participating in battles on the Crimean and North Caucasian fronts. In May 1944, after suffering a concussion, he was demobilized with the rank of engineer-colonel (or colonel of artillery, according to other sources) at the request of the People's Commissariat for Power Stations of the USSR. He was assigned to resume the construction of the Khrami HPP, where he worked until its completion in 1947.

=== Post-war career ===
In 1947, Eristov defended his dissertation for the degree of Candidate of Technical Sciences on the topic of underground structures. From 1948 to 1949, while serving as deputy chief engineer of the Gruzgidroenergostroy trust, he was involved in the construction of the Sukhumi and Samgori HPPs.

Due to his extensive knowledge and experience, he was often sent to "problematic" construction sites to solve complex technical challenges. For instance, his proposal to replace the gravity dam design of the Lajanuri HPP with an arch dam resulted in significant economic savings and shortened construction time. He is also credited with resolving a critical situation that arose during the excavation of the pressure tunnel for the Khrami HPP-2.

In 1949, he was transferred to Moscow as head of the technical department of Glavgidroenergostroy at the Ministry of Power Stations. In 1950, he was appointed chief engineer for the construction of the Main Turkmen Canal, and in 1953, he became chief engineer for the construction of the Novosibirsk Hydroelectric Power Station.

In 1955, Eristov was recalled to Moscow, where he held senior positions in the central apparatus of the ministry until 1963, including head of the technical directorate of the Ministry of Construction of Power Stations and chief engineer of the technical directorate of the State Committee for Energy and Electrification. During this time, he was actively involved in solving technical problems for the design and construction of major hydroelectric stations, including the Volga, Bratsk, Krasnoyarsk, as well as the Aswan High Dam in Egypt and the Naghlu Dam in Afghanistan.

=== Scientific and academic career ===
From 1963 until his death, Eristov worked at the V. V. Kuibyshev Moscow Institute of Civil Engineering (MISI), where he chaired the Department of Production and Organization of Hydraulic Works. He was awarded the title of Professor in 1963 and defended his doctoral dissertation in 1968.

Eristov's main research interests focused on the calculation of linings for hydraulic tunnels, the organization of construction work for energy facilities, and the development of technology for erecting enclosing structures on large rivers. He supervised 16 Candidate of Sciences dissertations. He authored about 90 published works, including seven monographs, and was the editor of the first university textbook Production of Hydraulic Works (1970). From 1961 to 1963, he was the editor-in-chief, and from 1963, the deputy editor-in-chief of the journal Hydrotechnical Construction, where he was known as a helpful and kind consultant to aspiring authors.

He died on 11 November 1975 in Moscow and was buried at the Khimkinskoye Cemetery.

== Organizational and public activities ==
V. S. Eristov was active in scientific and organizational work as a member of:

- The Technical Councils of the Ministry of Energy and Electrification of the USSR and the Gidroproekt Institute.
- The hydraulic construction sections of the scientific and technical councils of Gosstroy and the Ministry of Higher Education of the USSR.
- The Expert Committee of the Higher Attestation Commission.
- The hydropower section of the Scientific and Technical Council of the GKNT USSR.
- The Soviet National Committee on Large Dams.

He frequently traveled abroad and led Soviet delegations at international congresses and conferences on hydraulic construction.

In addition to his scientific work, he was involved in political activities:

- Delegate to the 19th Congress of the Communist Party of the Soviet Union (1952).
- Candidate member of the Central Committee of the Communist Party of Uzbekistan (1950–1954).
- Deputy and member of the Presidium of the Supreme Soviet of the Karakalpak ASSR (1950–1954).
- Member of the Berdsk City Committee of the CPSU in the Novosibirsk Oblast.
- Member of the Presidium of the Georgian Republican Trade Union of Power Station Workers (1948–1949).

== Family ==
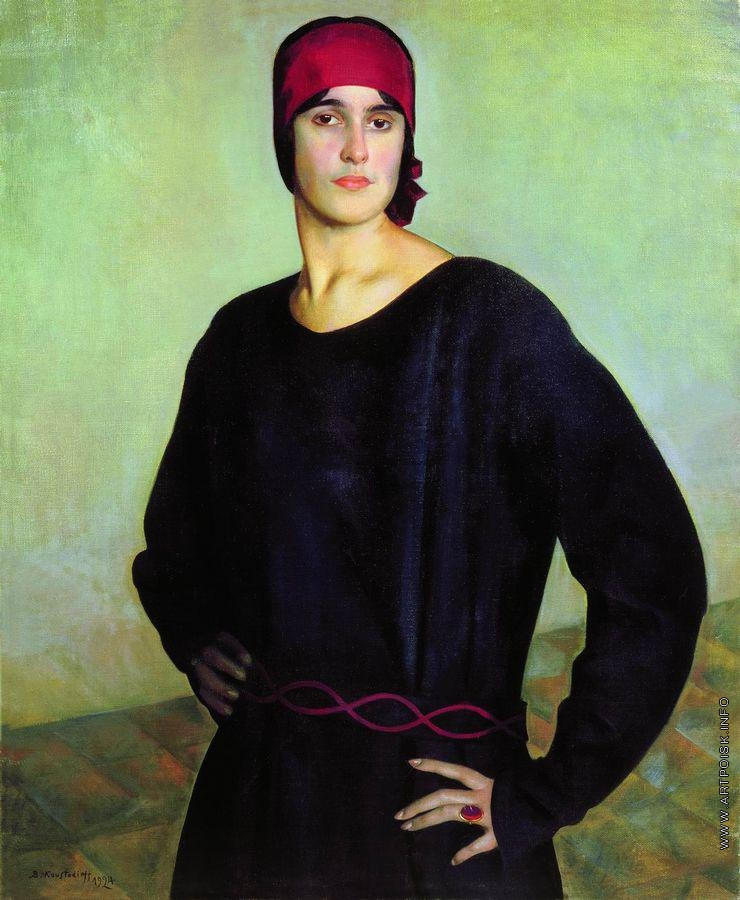
Portrait of Tatiana Chizhova by Boris Kustodiev

- Father: Sardion Eristov, a pharmacist.
- Mother: Aleksandra Grigoryevna Fyodorova, a paramedic.
- Wife: Tatiana Nikolaevna Chizhova (1905–1985), daughter of engineer Nikolai Klavdievich Chizhov (1865–1935) and granddaughter of architect Dorimedont D. Sokolov.

== Awards and honors ==
- Stalin Prize, second degree (1951) – for creative efforts in the design and construction of the Khrami HPP-1.
- Honored Builder of the RSFSR (1970).
- Order of Lenin.
- Order of the Red Banner of Labour.
- Two Orders of the Badge of Honour.
- Seven medals, including the Medal "For the Defence of the Caucasus" and the Medal "For the Victory over Germany in the Great Patriotic War 1941–1945".
- Corresponding Member of the USSR Academy of Construction and Architecture (1957).

== Bibliography ==
- Chogovadze, G. I. (1982). Выдающийся ученый — гидротехник В. С. Эристов [Outstanding Scientist — Hydraulic Engineer V. S. Eristov] (in Russian). Tbilisi: Metsniereba. p. 64.
