= Trialeti petroglyphs =

Prehistoric rock art in Trialeti, Georgia

Trialeti Petroglyphs
- თრიალეთის პეტროგლიფები (Georgian)
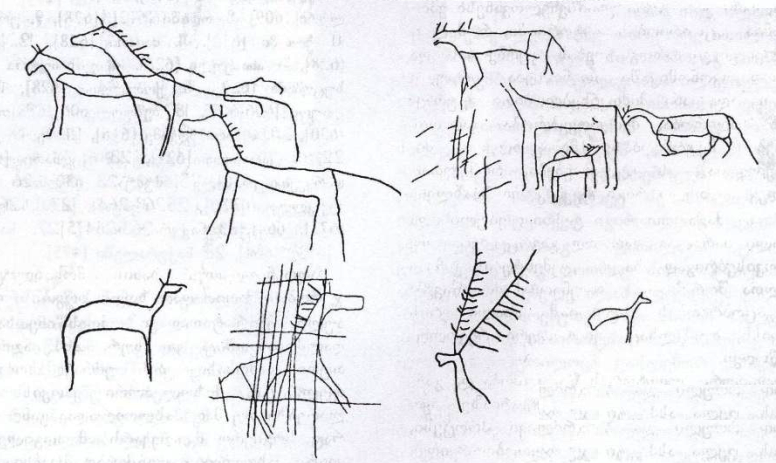
- Schematic sketches of the Trialeti petroglyphs

- Location of Trialeti Petroglyphs in Georgia
- 41.586227°N 43.977232°E
- Type: Rock art
- Periods: Mesolithic–Middle Bronze Age
- Location: Gantiadi, Tsalka Municipality, Kvemo Kartli, Georgia

Trialeti petroglyphs (Georgian: თრიალეთის პეტროგლიფები, romanized: trialetis p'et'roglipebi) is prehistoric rock art in the Trialeti area, in the Tsalka Municipality, engraved over a number of periods from the Mesolithic to the Middle Bronze Age. The depictions include geometric, zoomorphic and anthropomorphic images. It is recognized as a monument of the Cultural Heritage of Georgia and is part of the Prehistoric Rock Art Trails, a cultural route designated by the Council of Europe.

The Trialeti petroglyphs are located some 12 km east of the town of Tsalka, in the narrow gorge of the Avdris-Tsqali or Patara Khrami river—a right tributary of the Ktsia River—on the outskirt of the village of Gantiadi (former Tikilisa) in the Kvemo Kartli region, in an area which was historically known as Trialeti. This rock art site was discovered in the 1880s and rediscovered, after a series of futile attempts, in 1976. It is the only example of prehistoric rock art of this type found on the territory of Georgia; carvings at Mghvimevi cave in Imereti and Agtsa in Abkhazia are limited to simple geometric motifs. The site is at a risk of deterioration.

The Trialeti petroglyphs include about 100 images, clustered into six panels, carved across 50 m of a flat basalt surface. Animals are the most common depictions and include local fauna, such as deer, horses, mountain goats, birds, and fish, as well as fantastic and hybrid creatures. The images are schematic and represented side-on, with emphasis on certain elements, such as antlers. One scene shows a female deer feeding its fawn. Elsewhere, animals are depicted entangled in a hunter's net. Human figures are hunters, equipped with bows and arrows, and diminutive in comparison to the animals, measuring between 2.5 cm and 18–20 cm, mostly of 1–2 mm in width and depth. The hunters are shown front-on and more schematically than the animals. The figures are static, holding their hunting weapons in the left hand. Geometric figures include crosses, checkerboards, and sunbursts.

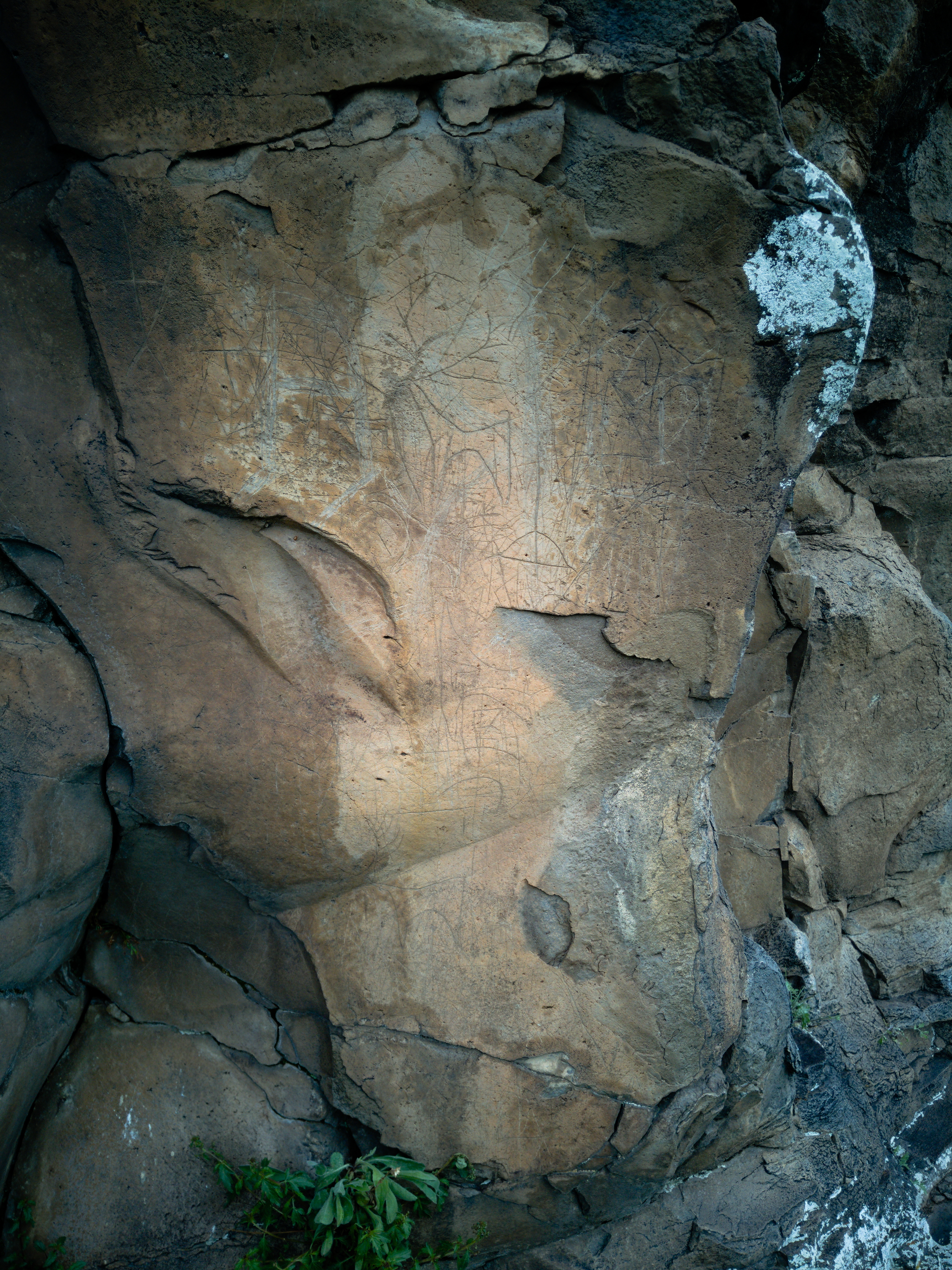
Petroglyphs destroyed with contemporary drawings
