= Sameba, Georgia =

Village in Tsalka Municipality, Georgia

Sameba Georgian: მარანი
- Village
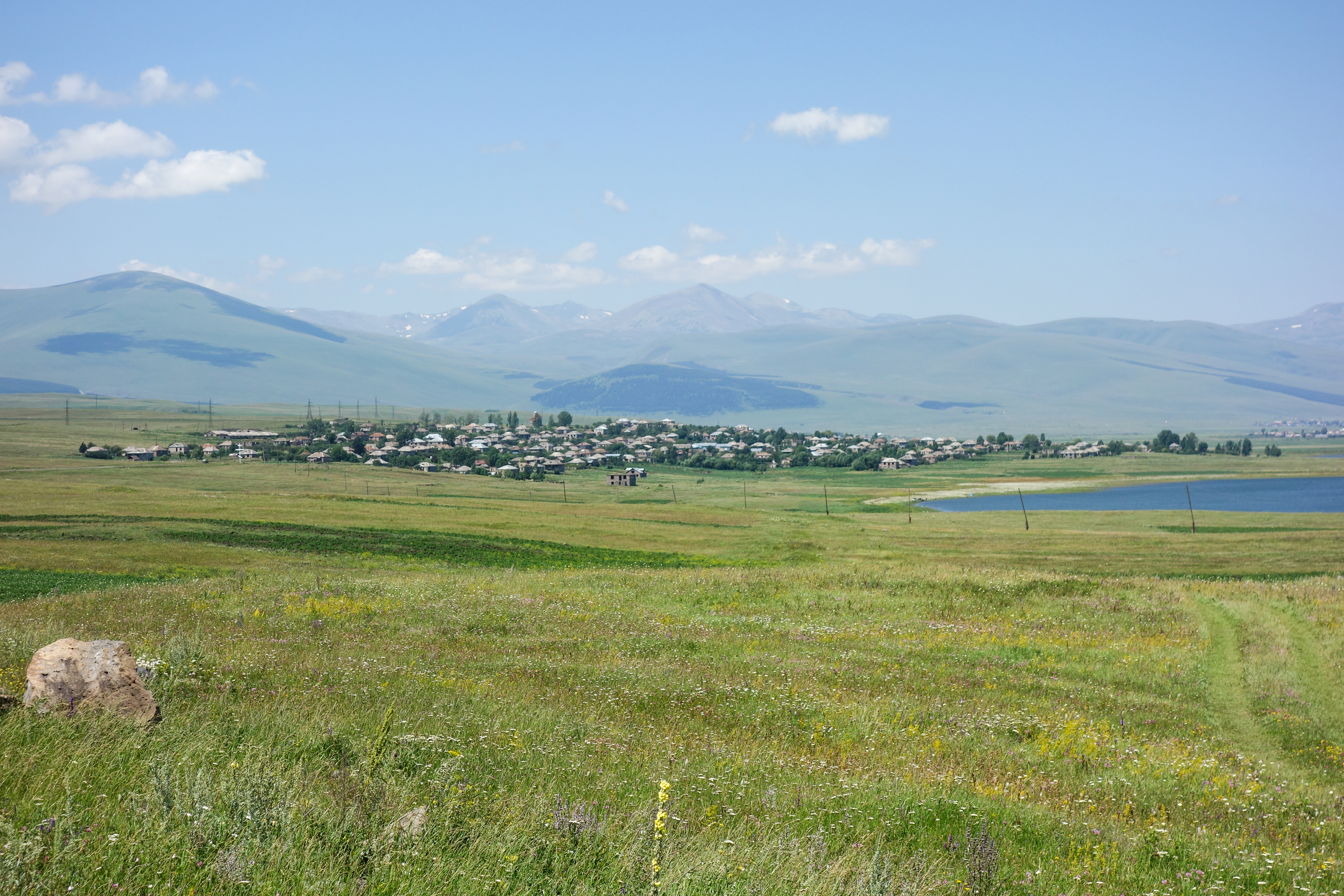
- View of the Landscape of Sameba Village, Kvemo Kartli, Georgia

- Location in Georgia Sameba (Georgia)
- Coordinates: 41°35′59″N 44°0′21″E
- Country: (Georgia (country)) Georgia
- Region: Kvemo Kartli
- Municipality: Tsalka Municipality

Population (2014)
  - Total: 693
- Time zone: UTC+4 (Georgian Time)

Sameba (Georgian: სამება [sameba]; formerly Gunia-Kala, Kastron; Greek: Γκουνιά-Καλά, Κάστρον; Georgian: გუნიაკალა [ɡuniɑkʼɑlɑ]) is a predominantly Greek village in Tsalka Municipality, Georgia.

== History ==
The village was founded in 1830 by Pontic Greeks from a village of the same name in the Trebizond Vilayet in the Ottoman Empire.

Sameba is located 5 kilometers to the west of the city of Tsalka, which is the district's main city. In the 1930s one could still find older residents speaking the Pontic dialect of Greek. After the Second World War some people in the village retained the language, but the rest switched to speaking Turkish and Russian.

By the time of the collapse of the USSR there were about 700 households in Gunia-Kala, in which there lived more than 2000 people. In 2002 236 residents remained in the village, 72% of which were Greeks and 18% Georgians.

== See also ==
- Kvemo Kartli
