= Bediani =

Bediani ბედიანი Μπεντιάνι
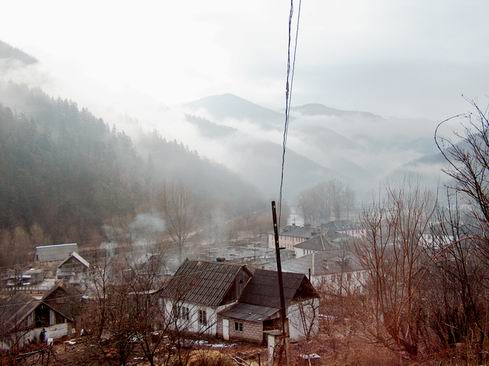
- Interactive map of Bediani
- Location within Georgia Location within Kvemo Kartli
- Coordinates: 41°32′13″N 44°15′12″E
- Country: Georgia
- Mkhare: Kvemo Kartli
- Municipality: Tsalka

Population (2014)
  - Total: 148
- Climate: Cfb

Bediani (Georgian: ბედიანი, Greek: Μπεντιάνι) is a town in Kvemo Kartli region of Georgia, in the south-East part of Tsalka Municipality, on the right bank of the Khrami River, at approx. 850 m above sea level.

== Location and natural conditions ==
Bediani Borough is situated in the narrow gorge of the river Khrami and stretches from Northwest to Southeast. The climate of Bediani has quite cold winters (temperatures sometimes fall to -20 degrees Celsius in January) and relatively hot summers. Bediani and its surroundings are mostly covered with forests of oak, nut, hornbeam, pine and birch. There are a lot of different wild fruits; there is also an evergreen pine in the high zone of the forest. There are also rich fauna in the area, including roe deer, wild boar, hares, foxes, hedgehogs, bears, wolves, and lynx. It is too important the recreational potential of Bediani and its surroundings, which is created by the magnificent natural landscape and many historical monuments. Bediani is app. 30 km. far from municipality centre (Tsalka) and town Tetritskaro.

== History ==
The early occupation of Bediani was solely monastic, with a number of monasteries in the area. However, the Soviet annexation of Georgia in 1922 meant that religious activities ceased. There was no settlement until the 1950s. The current settlement was founded in 1954 as part of the construction of the nearby Khramhesi Dam. The first inhabitants were the workers of this construction. In 1963 the Georgian Republic's psycho-neurological hospital opened, housing 800 patients.

The creation of the borough caused the developing of social infrastructure; a medicine dispensary was opened that served the settlements combined in the borough community, and a school for 220 pupils was founded. There were two Young Pioneer camps on the territory of the borough community: one at Khramhes 2 (Chatakvi); and one on the territory of the village of Pantiani that received hundreds of visitors every year.

The economical and political crises of the country at the end of the 1980s and in the beginning of the 1990s had a pronounced effect on Bediani life, and the number of inhabitants dropped dramatically.

== Inhabitants ==
The majority (90%) of Bediani inhabitants were Greeks until the 1990s. At the end of September 1999, new settlers appeared in the borough who were the children and teachers of the Children's Centre, near the St. George Mtatsmindeli Convent. The new settlers completely changed the structure of the borough. Before they arrived, the Convent was re-established by the blessing of patriarch of Georgia Ilia II, where the nuns moved from Tbilisi Peristsvaleba Convent. The nuns had close relation with children and the first children were sheltered in this Convent. The children moved into Bediani and they were dispersed among the different houses which were bought for them by the help of foreign organizations. One teacher lives with children in a house that gives the ability to create the family surroundings that contribute to the child's normal development. Nowadays there are app. 200 inhabitants in the borough.

== See also ==
- Kvemo Kartli

== Resources ==
- Charity and Education Centre - Bediani
- Summer camp in bediani, 2005 video
