= Beshtasheni =

Village in Kvemo Kartli, Georgia

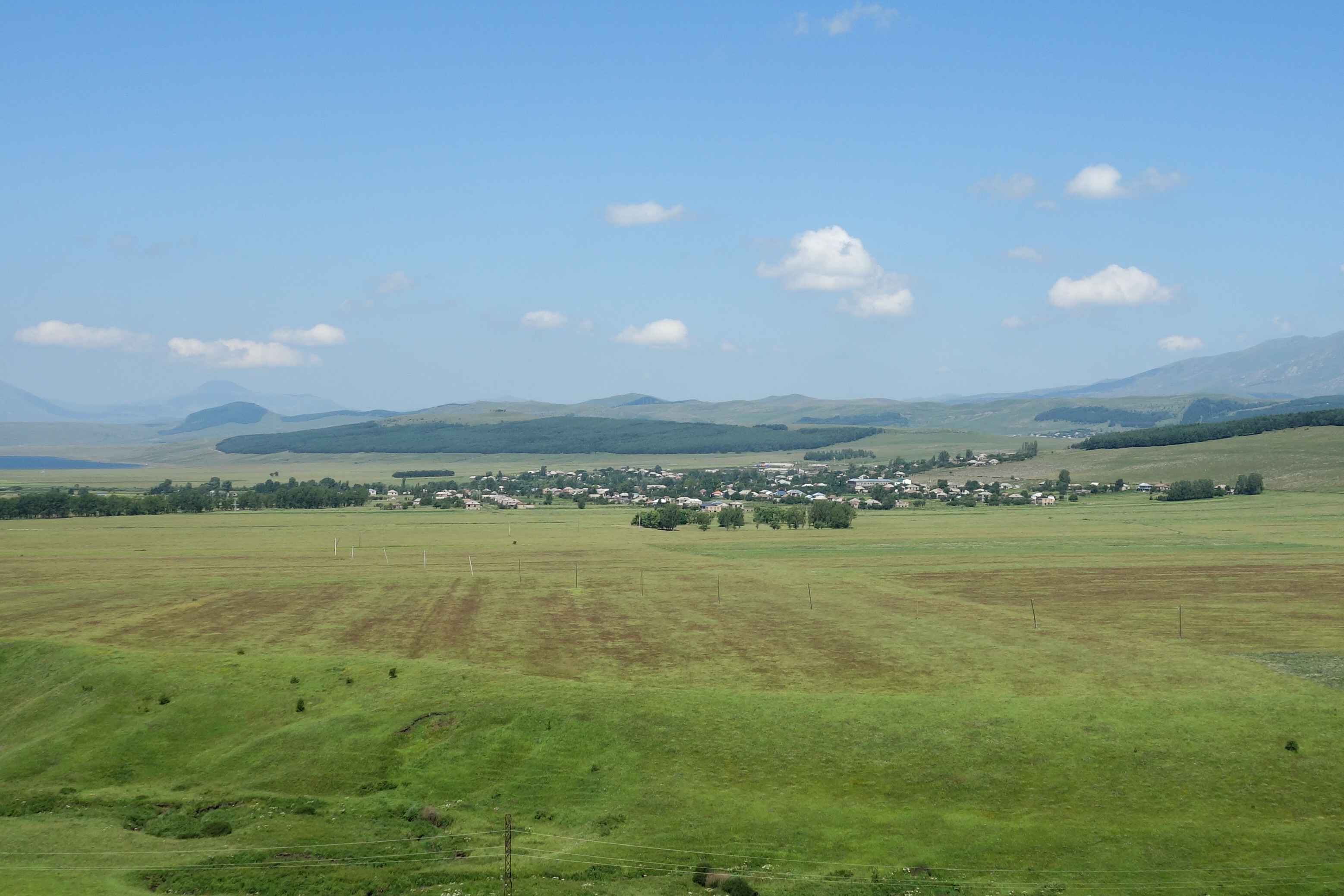
Village Beshtasheni

Beshtasheni (Georgian: ბეშთაშენი, Greek: Μπεστασένι) is a village near Tsalka in southern Georgia's Kvemo Kartli region. Almost all the population are Greeks. These Pontian Greeks are also known as Tsalka Urums. The 2014 census recorded a 335 population; 170 females and 165 males.

== See also ==
- Kvemo Kartli
- Tsalka
- Pontic Greeks
- Urums

== See also ==
- Google Earth community map
- 41.637769°N 44.111824°E Geo-links for Beshtasheni
