= Ladzhanuri Hydro Power Plant =

Hydroelectric dam and power plant in Tsageri, Georgia

Ladzhanuri Dam
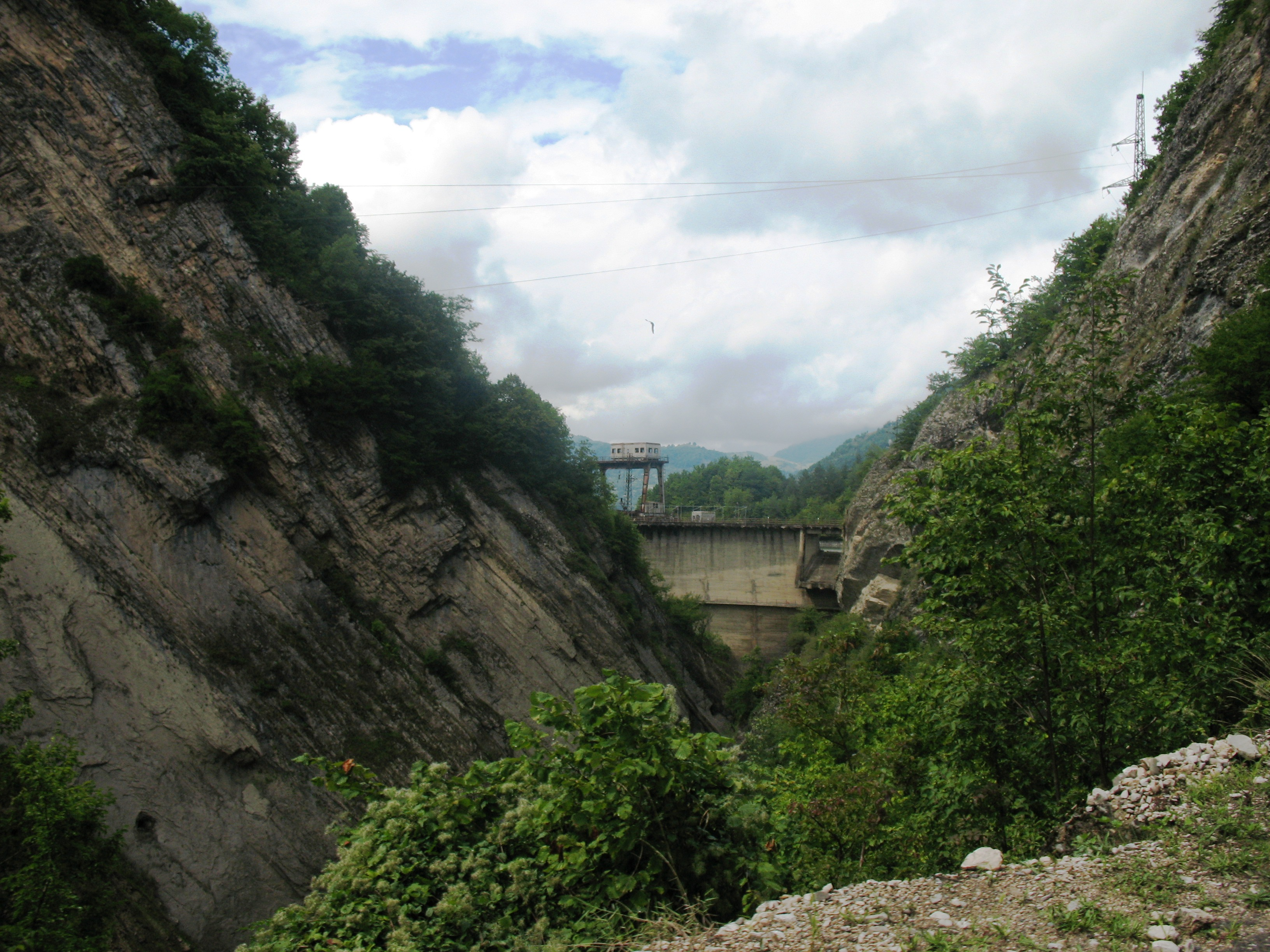

- Location within Georgia
- Official name: ლაჯანურის ჰიდროელექტროსადგური
- Country: Georgia
- Coordinates: 42°35′22″N 42°51′06″E
- Construction began: 1953
- Opening date: 1960

Dam and spillways
- Impounds: Lajanura River; Tskenistskali River
- Height: 69 m (226 ft)
- Length: 127 m (417 ft)
- Width (crest): 3.7 m (12 ft)
- Width (base): 13 m (43 ft)

Reservoir
- Total capacity: 0.25 km^{3} (200,000 acre⋅ft)

Power Station
- Operator: Sakmtavarenergo
- Turbines: 3 × 37.6 MW
- Installed capacity: 113 MW
- Annual generation: 438 GWh

Ladzhanuri Hydro Power Plant or Lajanuri Hydro Power Plant (B. Chichinadze) — is one of the biggest and largest dam in Georgia, one of the nation's first and unique tall dams (Dam Height 69 M). Built in Tsageri municipality, the dam is supplied from the Tskenistskalis tributary Lajanura. Construction began in 1953 and ended in 1960. The station's power output is 112,5 thousand kW, yearly it produces 505 GwH. kWh electricity. Ladzhanuri HPP Dam's successful construction and exploitation boosted the Former USSR to construct more tall dams around the republics.

== Gallery ==
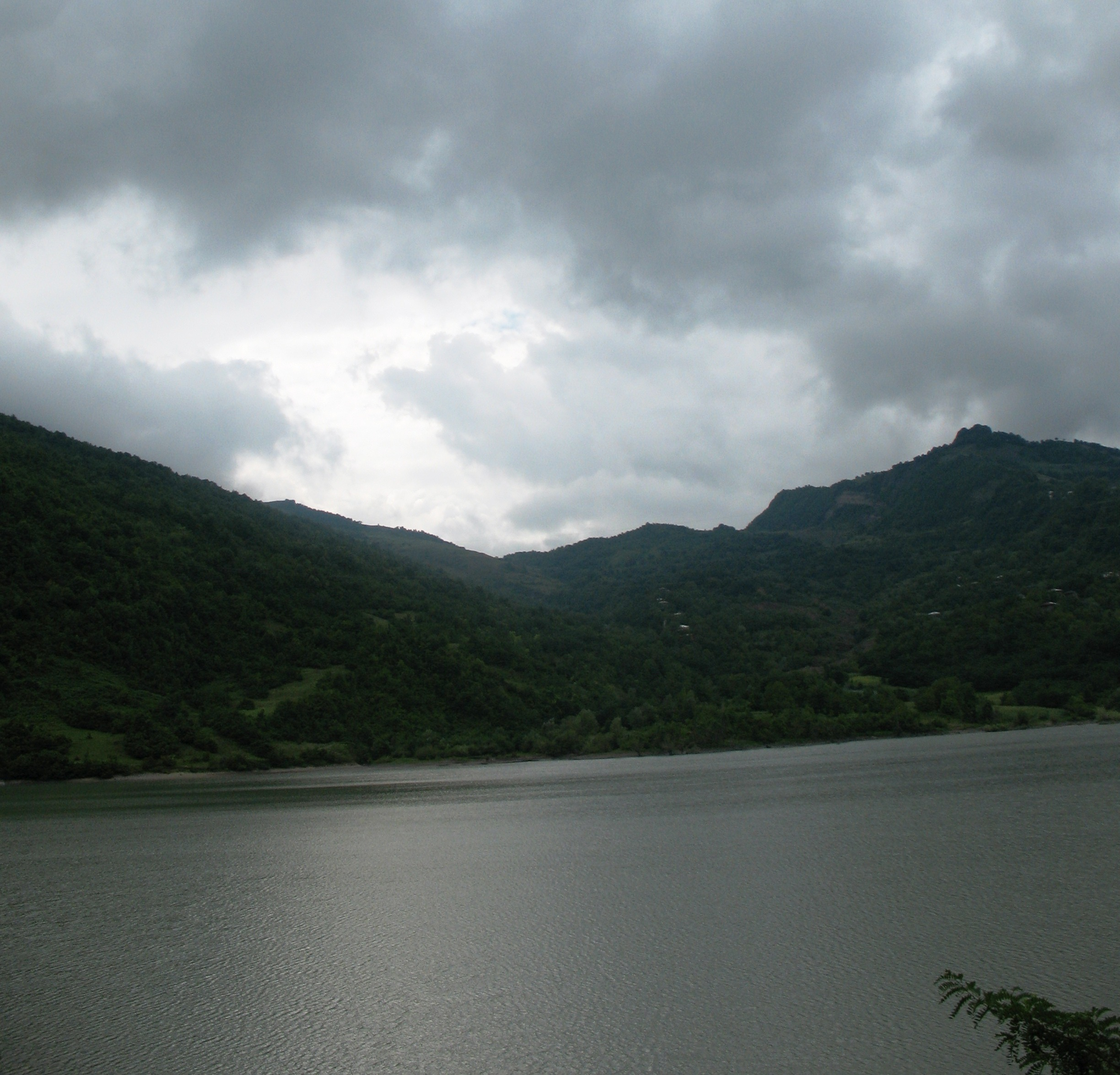
Lajanuri Reservoir

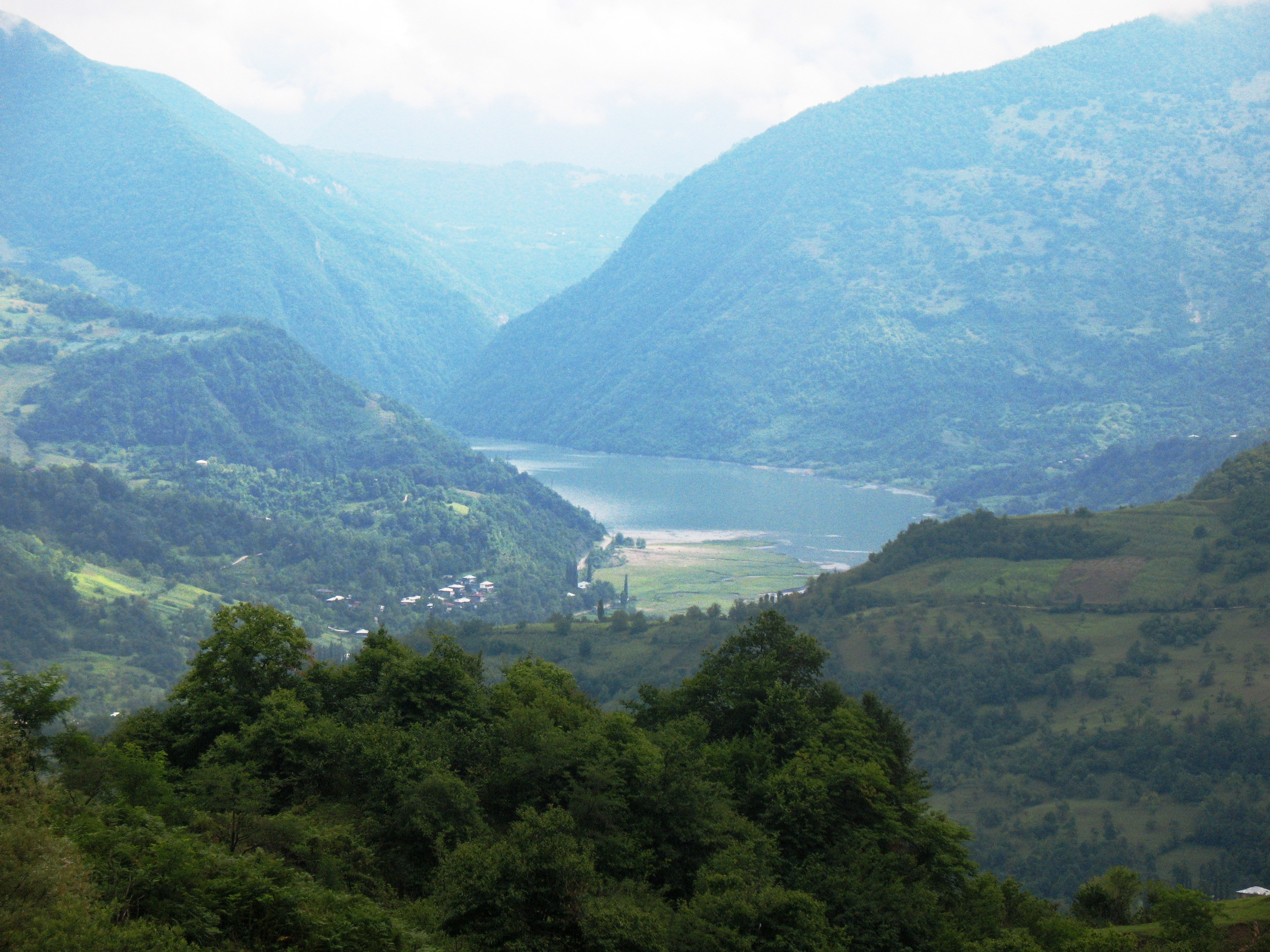
Lajanuri Reservoir

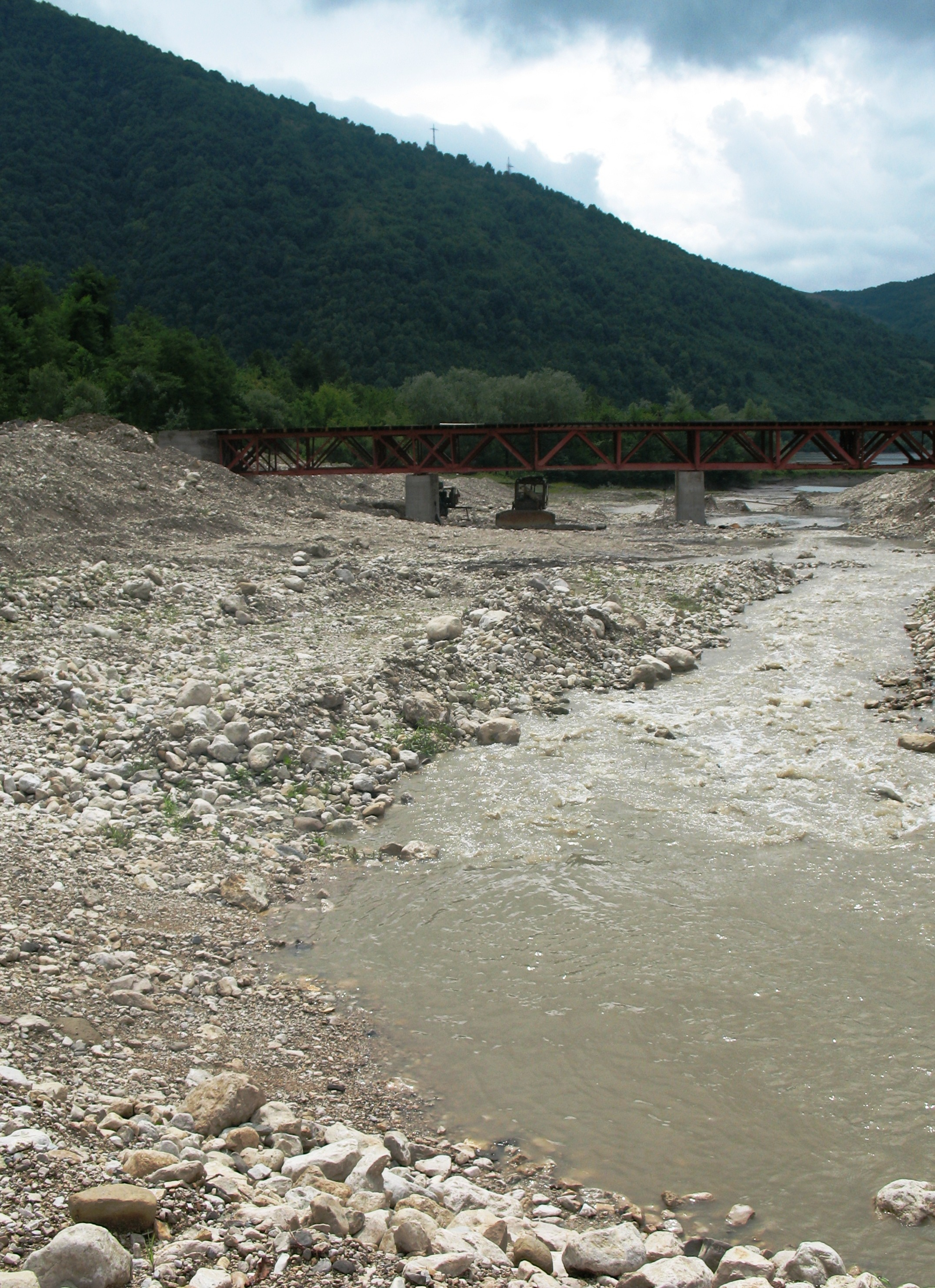
Near Lajanuri Reservoir

== See also ==
- List of power stations in Georgia (country)
- Energy in Georgia (country)
