= Tsalka Municipality =

Tsalka Municipality წალკის მუნიციპალიტეტი
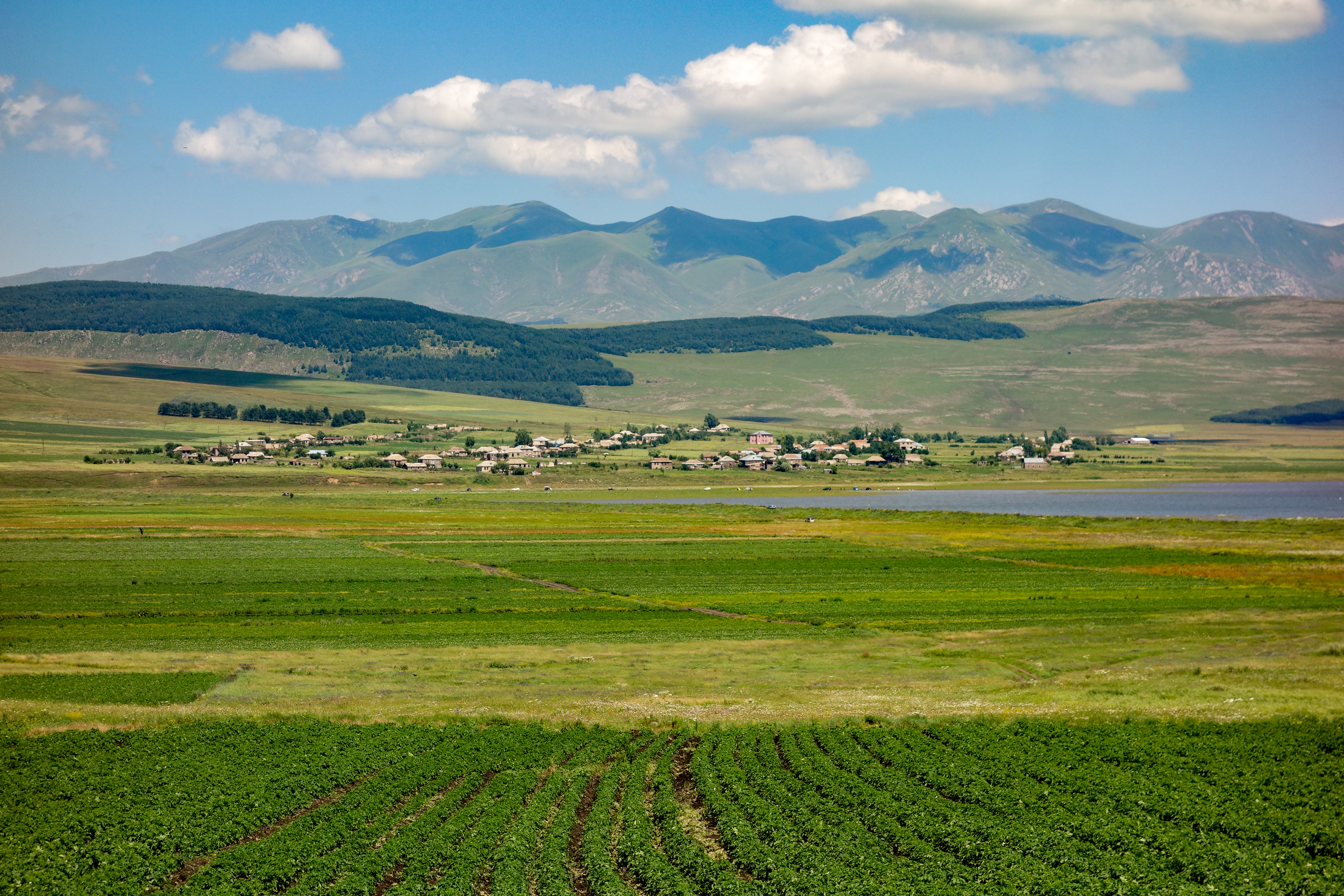
- Tsintskaro

- Flag Seal

- Interactive map of Tsalka Municipality
- Coordinates: 41°35′N 44°05′E
- Country: Georgia
- Mkhare: Kvemo Kartli
- Administrative centre: Tsalka

Government
  - Type: Mayor–Council
  - Body: Tsalka Municipal Assembly
  - Mayor: Ilia Sabadze (GD)

Area
  - Total: 1,050.6 km^{2} (405.6 sq mi)

Population (2021)
  - Total: 19,679
  - Density: 18.731/km^{2} (48.514/sq mi)

Population by ethnicity
  - Georgians: 46.7 %
  - Armenians: 38.8 %
  - Azerbaijanis: 7.0 %
  - Greeks: 6.9 %
- Time zone: UTC+4 (Georgian Time)
- Website: www.tsalka.gov.ge

Tsalka (Georgian: წალკის მუნიციპალიტეტი, romanized: ts'alk'is munitsip'alit'et'i; Greek: Δήμος Τσάλκας; Armenian: Ծալկայի Շրջան, romanized: Tsalkayi Šrǰan) is a municipality in Georgia's southern region of Kvemo Kartli, covering an area of 1,050.6 km^{2} (406 sq mi). As of 2021 it had a population of 19,679 people. The city of Tsalka is its administrative centre. The area of the municipality corresponds to the historical region of Trialeti.

== Administrative divisions ==
Tsalka municipality is administratively divided into 30 communities (თემი, temi) with 40 villages (სოფელი, sopeli), three urban-type settlements (დაბა, daba) and one city (ქალაკი, kalaki).

- city: Tsalka;
- daba: Bediani, Khramhesi and Trialeti.
- villages: for example Beshtasheni and Sameba.

== Population ==
Church of the Virgin Mary in Ayazma

The population of Tsalka is 19,679 according to the 2021 estimate, which is a slight increase from the last census of 2014 (18,849). The ethnic composition is 46.7% Georgian, 38.8% Armenian, 7.0% Azerbaijani and 6.9% Greek. The population density is 18.7 people per square kilometer.

Population Tsalka Municipality
	1897	1923	1939	1959	1970	1979	1989	2002	2014	2021
Tsalka Municipality	-	-	40,286	▲45,600	▲50,471	▼48,580	▼44,187	▼20,888	▼18,849	▲19,679
Tsalka (Note: Until 1932 Tsalka town was called Barmaksizi.)	-	1,650	▲4,875	▲7,065	▲5,819	▲6,245	▲8,043	▼1,741	▼2,326	▲3,136
Bediani (daba)	-	-	-	-	2,435	▼1,584	▼1,263	▼344	▼148	▼136
Khramhesi (daba)	-	-	-	-	-	-	-	118	▼78	▼62
Trialeti (daba)	-	-	-	7,591	1,617	▼1,435	▼707	▼434	▲510	▲627
Data: Population statistics Georgia 1897 to present. Note: (Note: The 2014 census found an inexplicable gap with the data from the national statistical office Geostat. UN-assisted research has found the 2002 census was inflated by about 8-9 percent. See, "1. Introduction", Page 1.)

== Politics ==
Tsalka Municipal Assembly (Georgian: წალკის საკრებულო) is the representative body in Tsalka Municipality, consisting of 30 members which are elected every four years. The last election was held in October 2021. Ilia Sabadze of Georgian Dream was reelected as mayor.

Party	2017	2021	Current Municipal Assembly
Georgian Dream	38	20	
United National Movement	2	6	
Progress and Freedom		1	
For Georgia		1	
Strategy Aghmashenebeli	1	1	
Independent	2	1	
European Georgia	1		
Alliance of Patriots	1		
Total	45	30	

== See also ==
- List of municipalities in Georgia (country)
