= Khramhesi =

Khramhesi ხრამჰესი
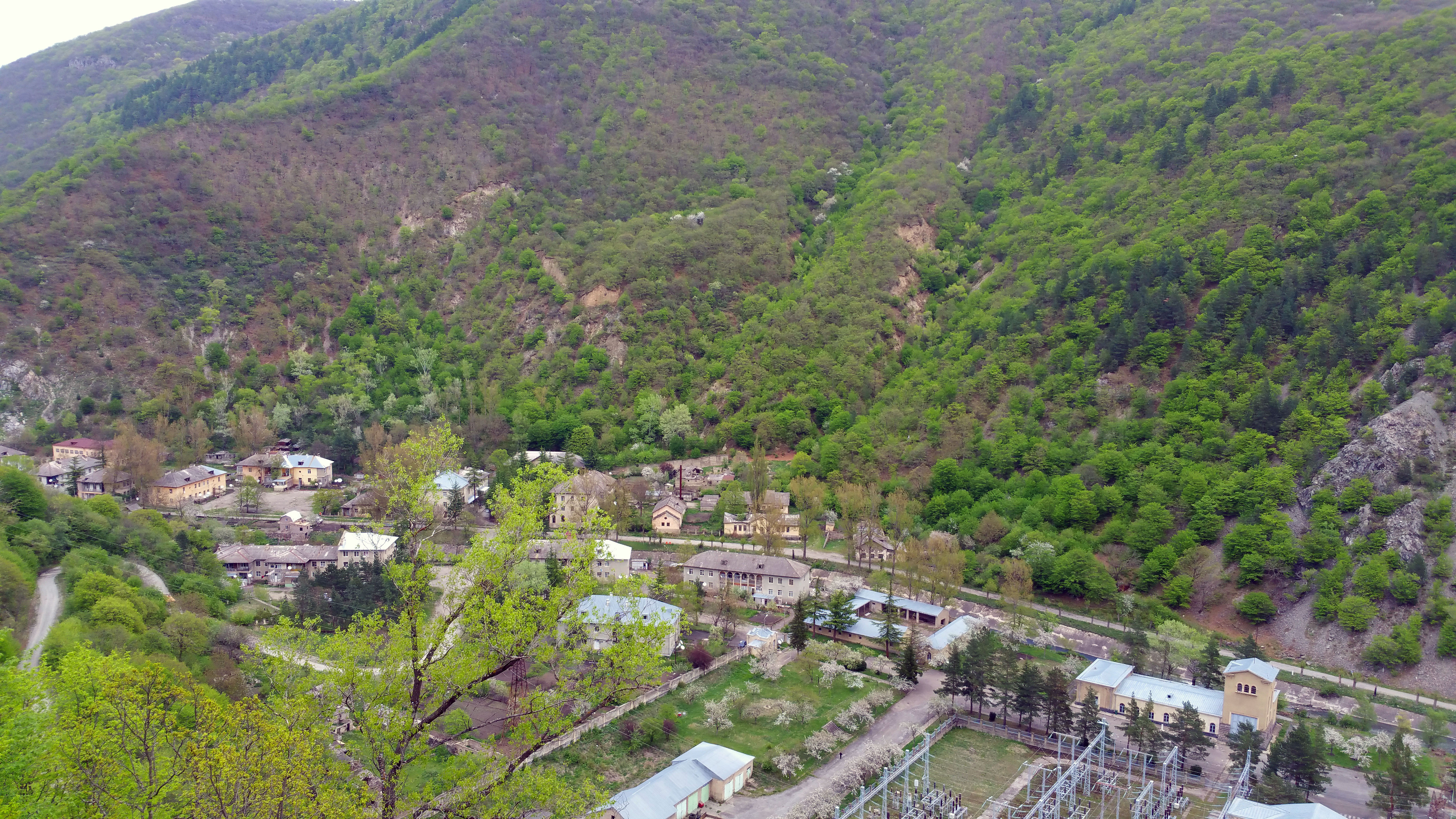
- Interactive map of Khramhesi
- Location in Georgia Khramhesi (Georgia)
- Coordinates: 41°33′05″N 44°07′26″E
- Country: Georgia (country)
- Mkhare: Kvemo Kartli
- Municipality: Tsalka
- Elevation: 1,110 m (3,640 ft)

Population (2023)
  - Total: 58

Khramhesi (Georgian: ხრამჰესი) is a daba in Tsalka Municipality, in the region of Kvemo Kartli, in Georgia. It is located in the forested gorge of the Khrami river, at 1110 meters above sea level. It was founded in the 1930s for the construction and operation of the Khramhesi-I hydroelectric power station on this site, which is also its main reason for existence. In 2019, Khramhesi was granted urban-type settlement (დაბა, daba) status. It is therefore one of the smallest daba in the country.

== History ==
In the early 1930s, a hydroelectric cascade was built around the administrative center of Tsalka Municipality, consisting of a reservoir (the Tsalkar Reservoir) and a hydroelectric power station in the Khrami river gorge, about 6 kilometers southeast of Tsalka. In 1934, construction of the hydroelectric power station began and Khramhesi was founded on this site. The hydroelectric power station is located more than 1,100 meters above sea level in the Khrami Gorge and is supplied via pipelines from the Tsalka Reservoir, which is 1,500 meters above sea level. The Chramhesi-I hydroelectric power station was commissioned in December 1947 and has an installed capacity of 3x37.6 MW. In 2019, 63 people worked at the plant.

A small reservoir was constructed on the discharge side of the power plant. In 1963, the Khramhesi-II hydroelectric power station, located at an altitude of 800 m (2,600 ft), was put into operation about 25 km (16 mi) downstream near the village of Ktsia after a construction period of nine years. This plant has an installed capacity of 2x55 MW, making the Khramhesi cascade one of the largest hydropower energy suppliers in Georgia, responsible for approximately 4% of energy production. Khramhesi-II receives its water mainly from the Khramhesi-I power plant via an almost 13 km (8.1 mi) long and four meter thick pipeline. The power station is located 164 m (538 ft) deep in the top of the gorge. The original plans called for the construction of two more power stations in the cascade, but these were not implemented.

=== Inter RAO ===
In 1996, the hydroelectric power stations were privatized and the operation and management of the power stations was transferred to AES Georgia Holdings B.V., registered in the Netherlands, for a period of 25 years. This company was taken over by the Russian state-affiliated energy company Inter RAO in 2003. The Georgian government entered into an agreement with Inter RAO in 2011 to transfer its entire ownership to the company for which Georgia received approximately US$100 million, with Inter RAO committing to the construction of additional hydroelectric power stations in the Khrami. The Khramesi hydroelectric power stations were transferred to the Dutch offshore holding company Gardabani Holdings BV. In 2021, the Georgian government lost an international arbitration case brought by Inter RAO, and Georgia was ordered to pay US$80 million due to the loss of revenue from the devaluation of the Georgian lari and the associated loss of revenue from a fixed rate.

== Demographics ==
As of 2023, Khramhesi had a population of 58, a decrease from the 2014 census. According to this census, Armenians were the largest population group (41%), followed by Georgians (33%) and Pontic Greeks (21%).

Year	1989	2002	2014	2020	2023
Population	-	118	78	62	58
Data accountability: Cities and dabas (Note: The 2014 census found an unexplained gap compared to the data from the national statistical agency Geostat. UN-supervised research has found that the 2002 census was overstated by about 8-9 percent. See, "1. Introduction", Page 1.)

== See also ==
- Kvemo Kartli
