= Tsalka =

Tsalka წალკა
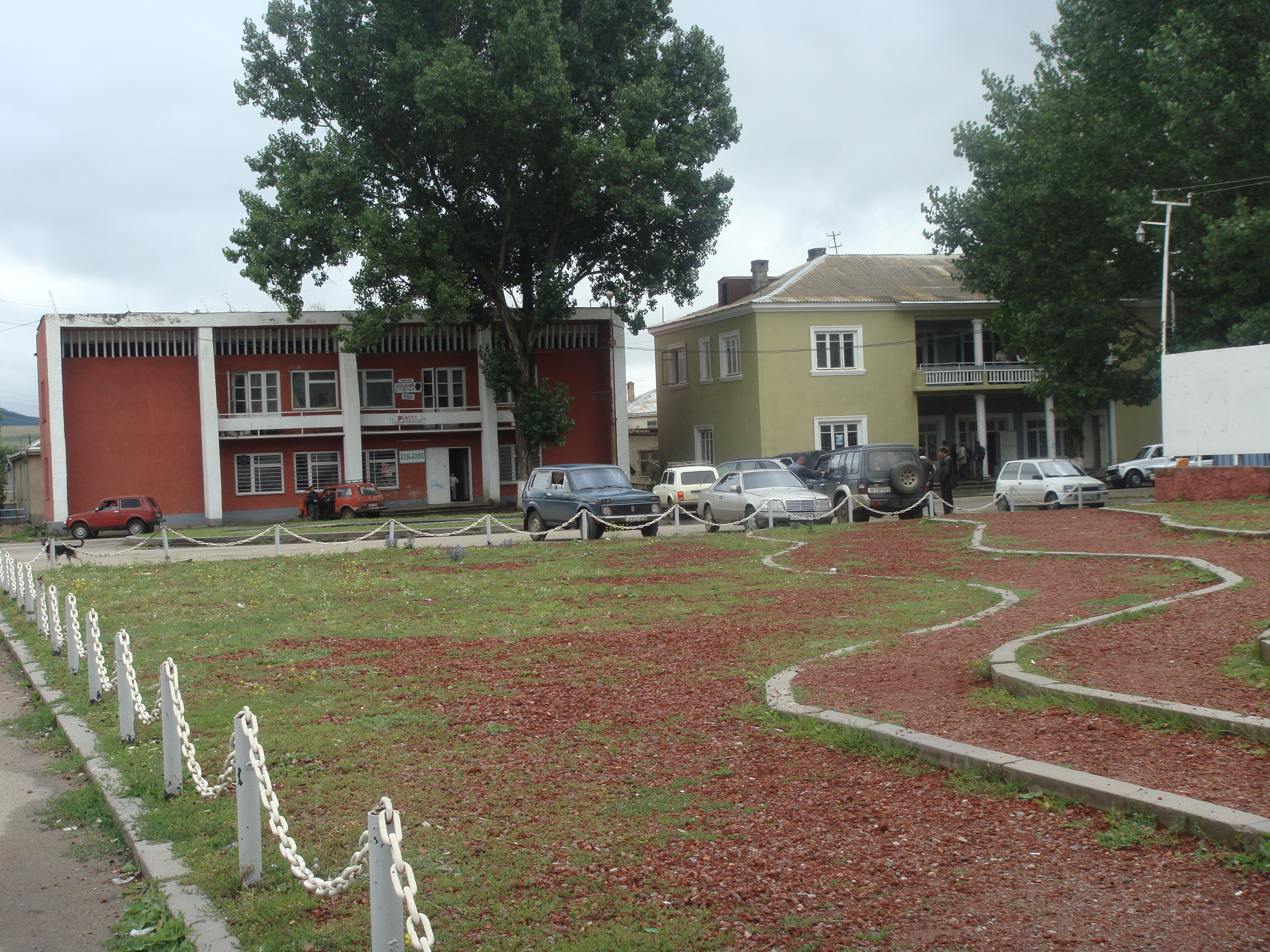

- Flag Seal
- Interactive map of Tsalka
- Location within Georgia Location within Kvemo Kartli
- Coordinates: 41°35′0″N 44°05′0″E
- Country: Georgia
- Mkhare: Kvemo Kartli
- District: Tsalka

Population (2024)
  - Total: 3,708
- Time zone: UTC+4 (Georgian Time)
- Climate: Dfb

Tsalka (Georgian: წალკა, romanized: ts'alk'a [tsʼaɫkʼa], Greek: Τσάλκα, Armenian: Թռեղք, romanized: T’ṙeġk’ or Ծալկա, Azerbaijani: Barmaqsız) is a town and municipality center in southern Georgia's Kvemo Kartli region.

== Population ==
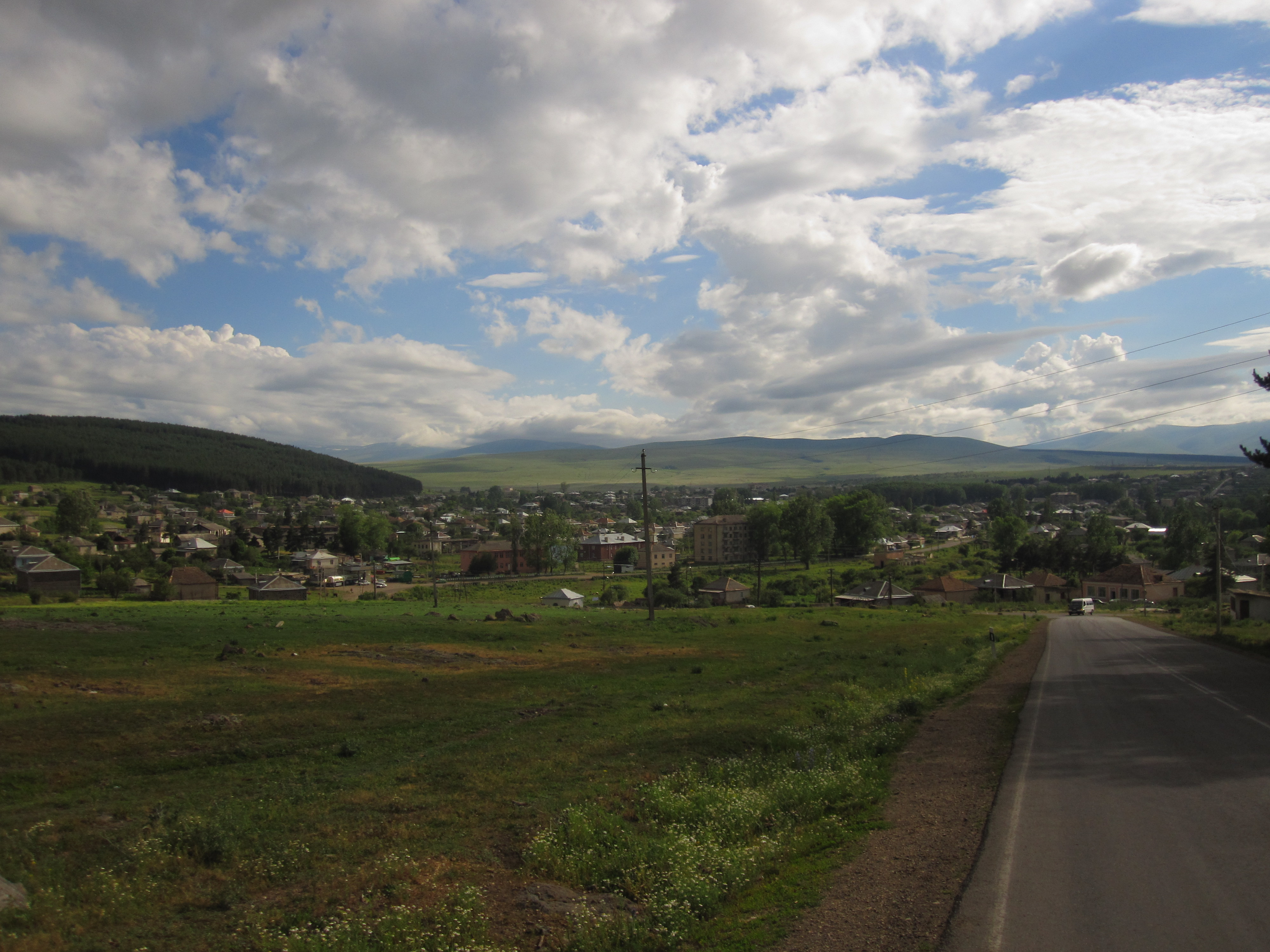
View of Tsalka.

The district had a population of 2,326. According to the 2014 census, 47% of its population is Georgian, 38% Armenian, 7% Caucasus Greeks, and 7% Azerbaijanis. Up until the 1990s, Russian served as the language of inter-ethnic communication and was the language of education in most of the schools in the Tsalka district. It was the only area in the USSR where the Greek language was taught in schools. Many Tsalka Greeks spoke the Tsalka language, a Turkish dialect.

The population in Tsalka district before 1990 was 55,000 people, and more than 90% Greeks (about 50,000). Before 1990, it was the only city in the USSR with such a high Greek population. There were 49 villages in the district, and 44 were Greek villages. In the past, Greeks used to be the majority of Tsalka, but now their numbers have considerably decreased due to emigration to Greece. Several thousand ethnic Georgians who had suffered from landslides in Svaneti and Adjara were settled in Tsalka in 1997–2006.

There are important historical monuments in Tsalka: Kldekari Fortress (ninth century) and the church of St. George in Dashbashi (tenth-eleventh centuries). Tsalka Canyon and its new bridge are also interesting tourist attractions.

== Geography ==
The town and municipality center of Tsalka is located south of the Tsalka Plateau in the Trialeti region, about 60 km southwest of the capital Tbilisi.

=== Climate ===
Climate data for Tsalka (1991–2020)
Month	Jan	Feb	Mar	Apr	May	Jun	Jul	Aug	Sep	Oct	Nov	Dec	Year
Record high °C (°F)	13.5 (56.3)	16.1 (61.0)	23.0 (73.4)	25.9 (78.6)	26.7 (80.1)	29.4 (84.9)	33.6 (92.5)	33.0 (91.4)	29.7 (85.5)	27.0 (80.6)	21.4 (70.5)	16.8 (62.2)	33.6 (92.5)
Mean daily maximum °C (°F)	2.2 (36.0)	3.2 (37.8)	6.9 (44.4)	12.0 (53.6)	16.5 (61.7)	20.4 (68.7)	23.1 (73.6)	23.5 (74.3)	19.3 (66.7)	14.6 (58.3)	8.6 (47.5)	4.1 (39.4)	12.9 (55.2)
Daily mean °C (°F)	−3.2 (26.2)	−2.4 (27.7)	1.5 (34.7)	6.4 (43.5)	10.9 (51.6)	14.6 (58.3)	17.3 (63.1)	17.3 (63.1)	13.4 (56.1)	8.8 (47.8)	2.9 (37.2)	−1.3 (29.7)	7.2 (45.0)
Mean daily minimum °C (°F)	−8.6 (16.5)	−7.9 (17.8)	−3.9 (25.0)	0.7 (33.3)	5.2 (41.4)	8.7 (47.7)	11.4 (52.5)	11.1 (52.0)	7.5 (45.5)	2.9 (37.2)	−2.8 (27.0)	−6.7 (19.9)	1.5 (34.7)
Record low °C (°F)	−31.0 (−23.8)	−33.4 (−28.1)	−21.6 (−6.9)	−12.8 (9.0)	−5.6 (21.9)	−3.0 (26.6)	2.0 (35.6)	3.3 (37.9)	−3.0 (26.6)	−10.3 (13.5)	−20.6 (−5.1)	−25.6 (−14.1)	−33.4 (−28.1)
Average precipitation mm (inches)	18.5 (0.73)	22.9 (0.90)	37.2 (1.46)	73.8 (2.91)	109.0 (4.29)	115.4 (4.54)	54.4 (2.14)	56.4 (2.22)	47.8 (1.88)	47.2 (1.86)	30.6 (1.20)	22.3 (0.88)	635.5 (25.02)
Average precipitation days (≥ 1.0 mm)	5.0	5.6	7.5	10.9	14.5	12.7	8.8	8.1	7.7	8.5	5.8	5.0	100.1
Source: NOAA

== Gallery ==
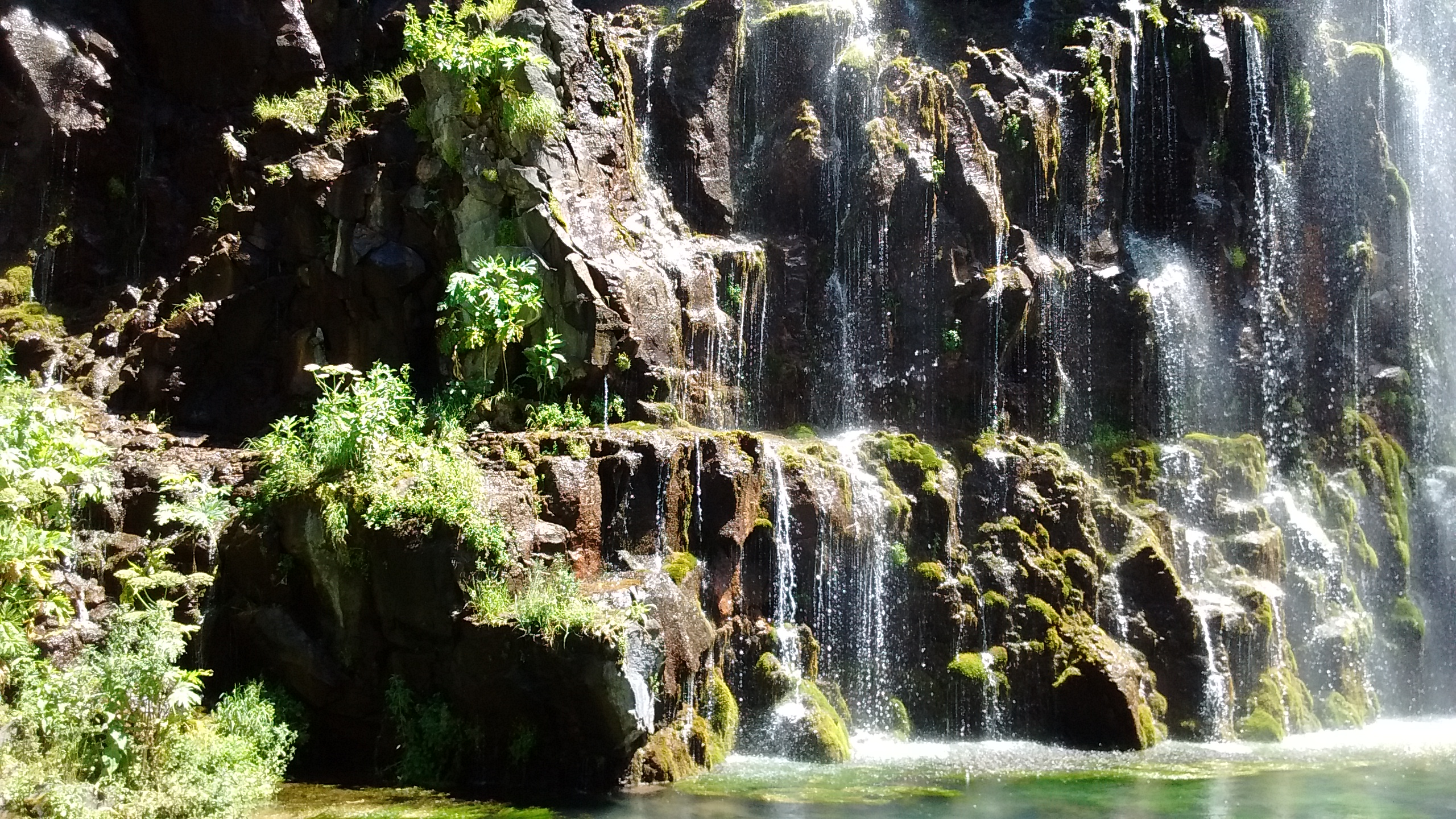
Dashbashi Waterfall in the Tsalka Canyon

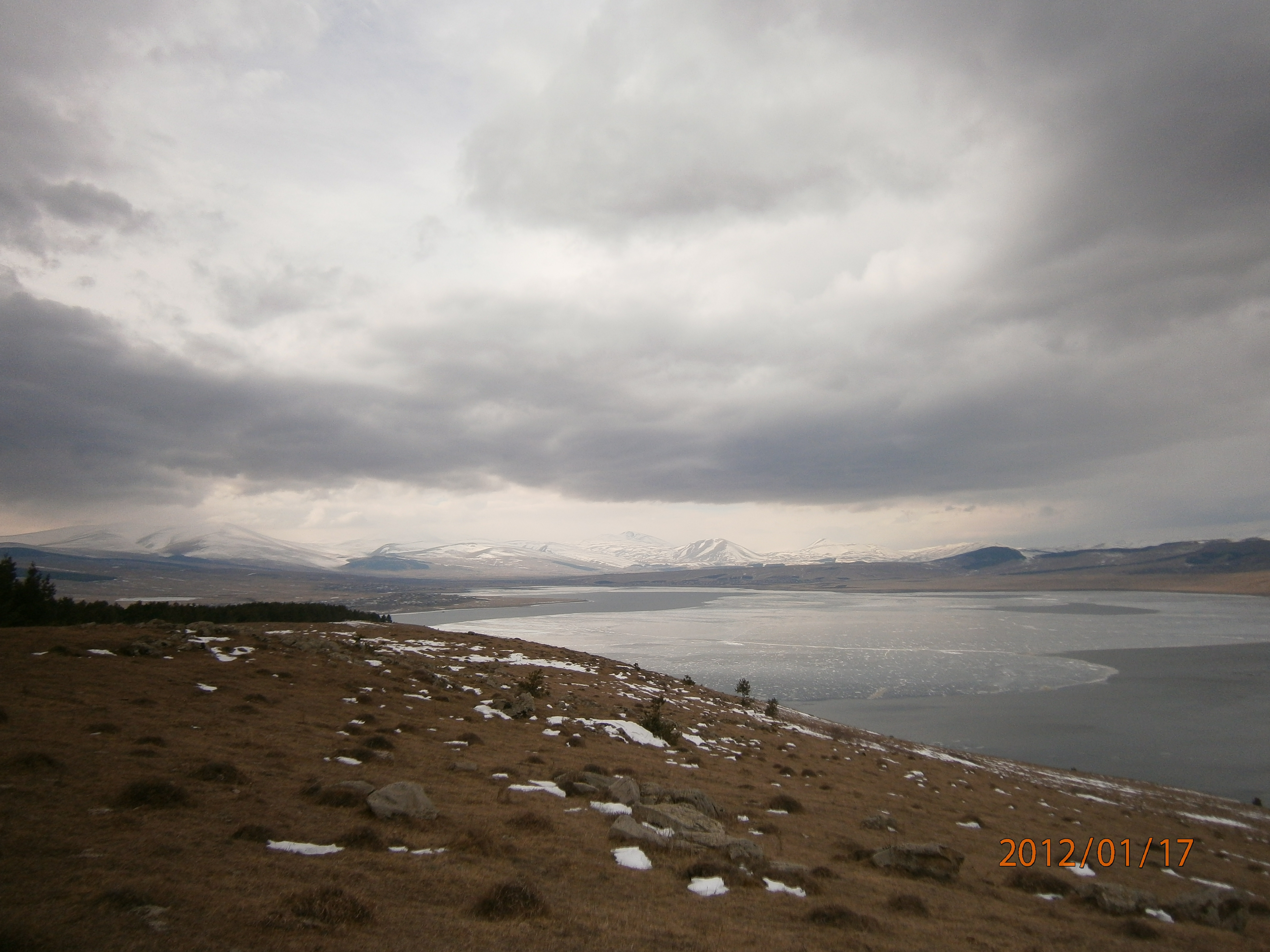
Panorama view of the Tsalka reservoir

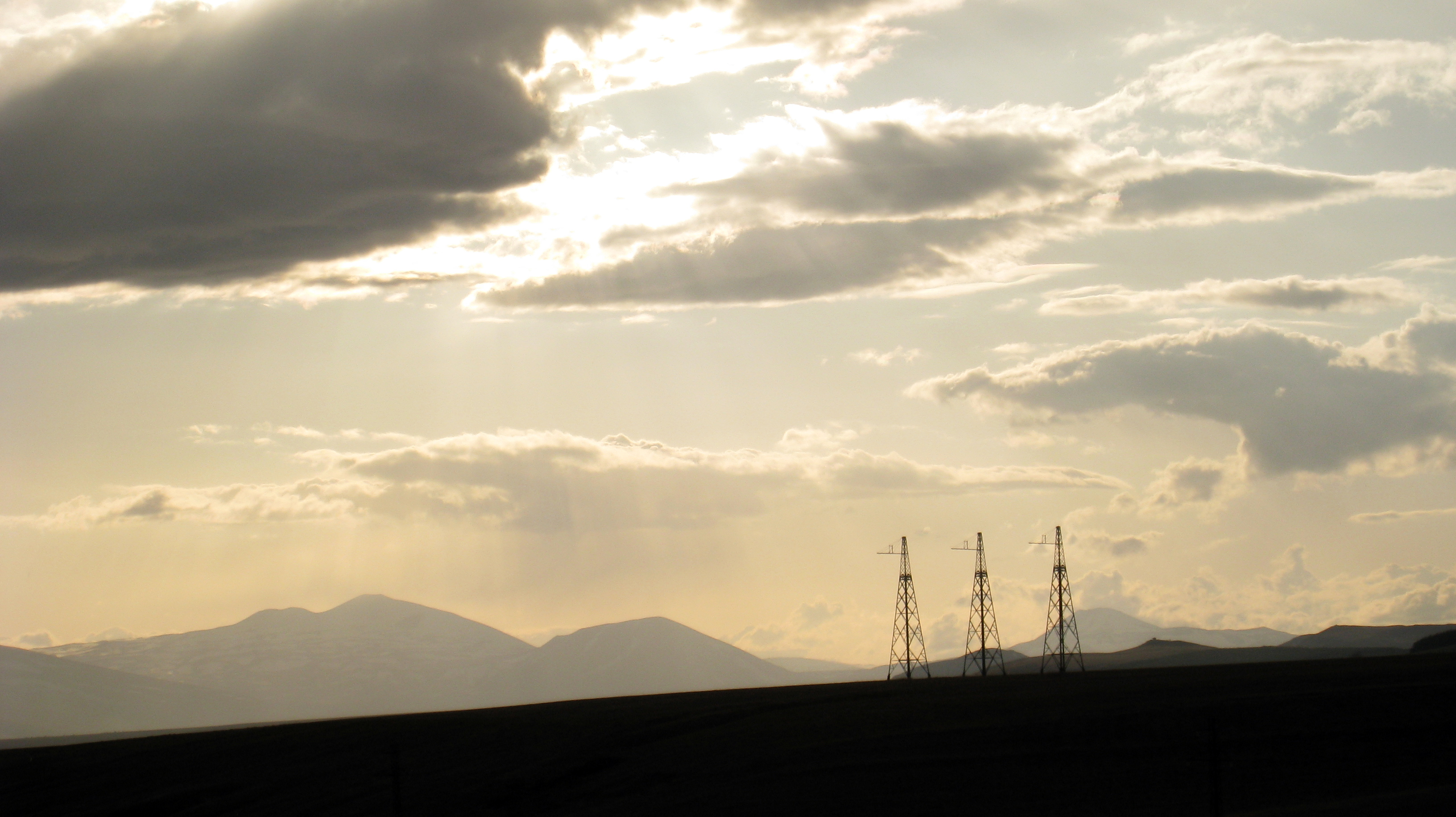

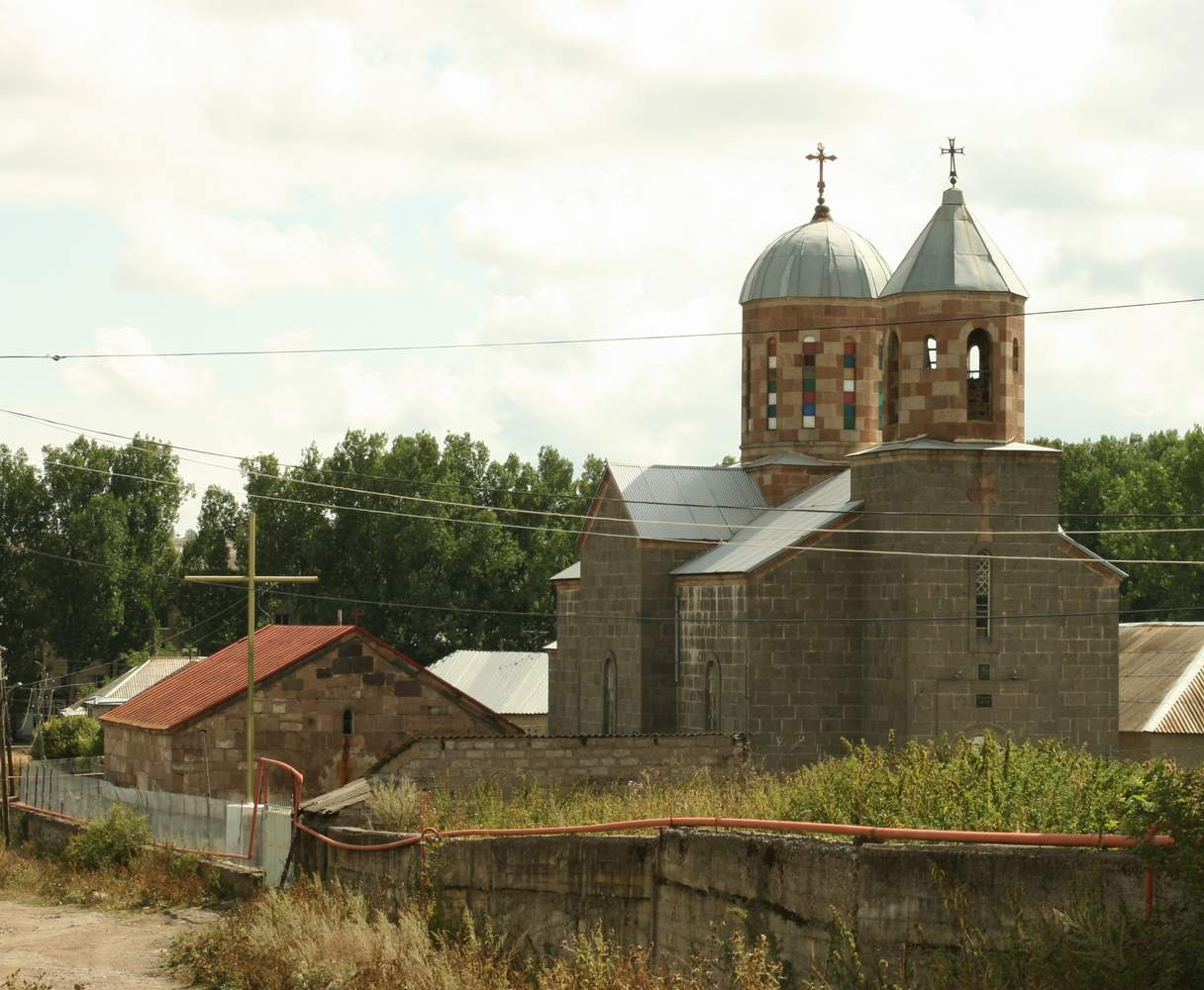
Greek Orthodox Church in the town

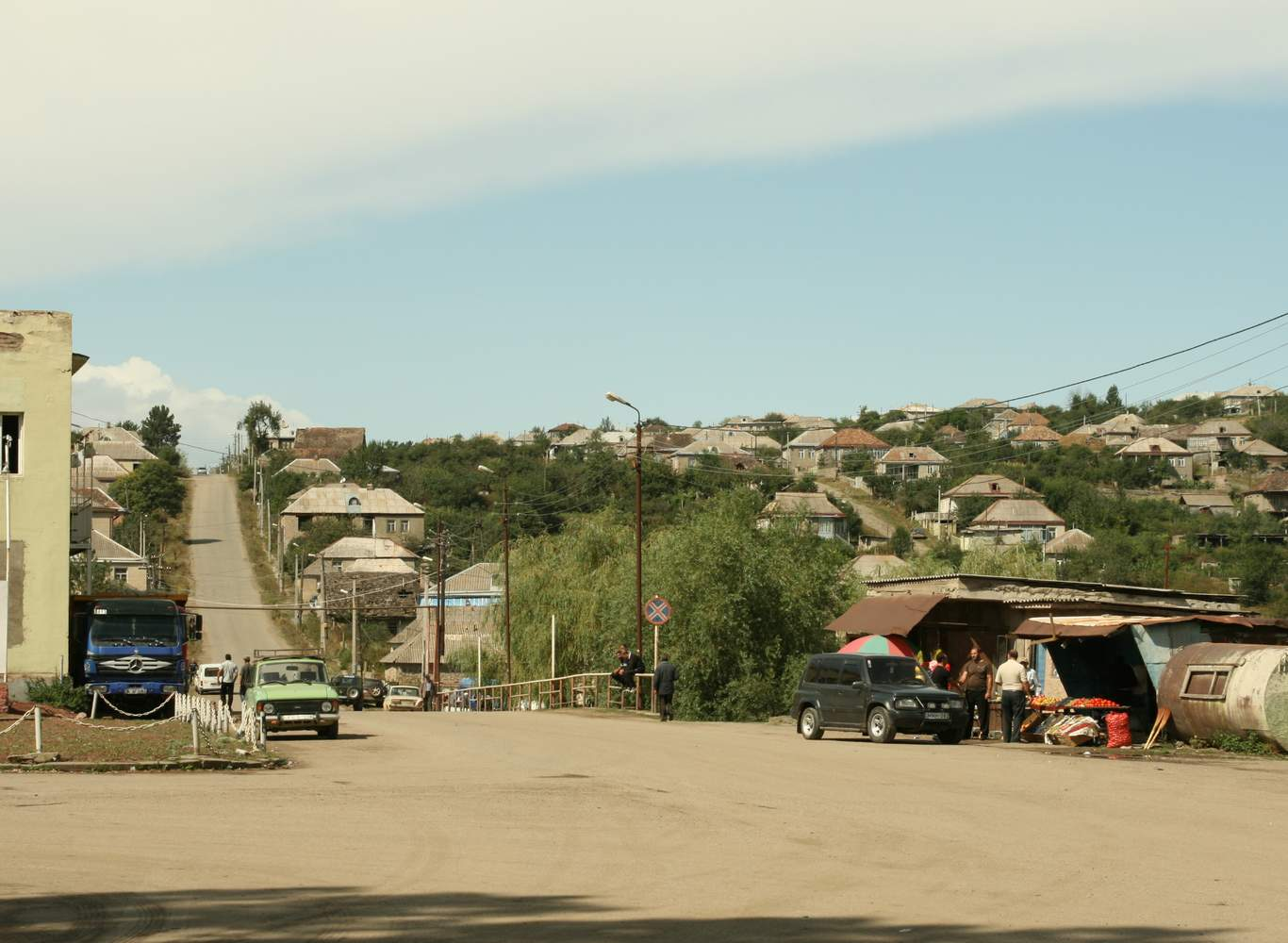
Street in Tsalka, 2010

== See also ==
- Tsalka Canyon Natural Monument
- Tsalka Urums
- Trialeti petroglyphs
