= Kemperi =

Kemperi ქემფერი
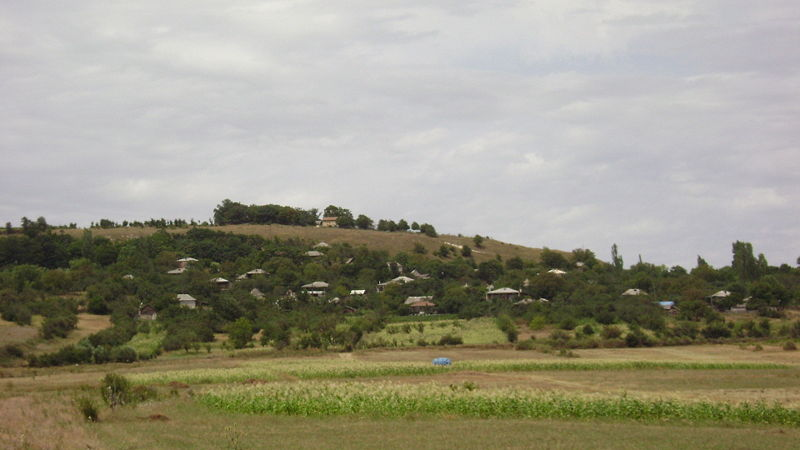

- Location in Georgia
- Coordinates: 42°2′30″N 43°36′10″E
- Country: Georgia
- Region: Shida Kartli
- Municipality: Khashuri
- Elevation: 800 m (2,600 ft)

Population (2014)
  - Total: 350
- Time zone: UTC+4 (Georgian Time)

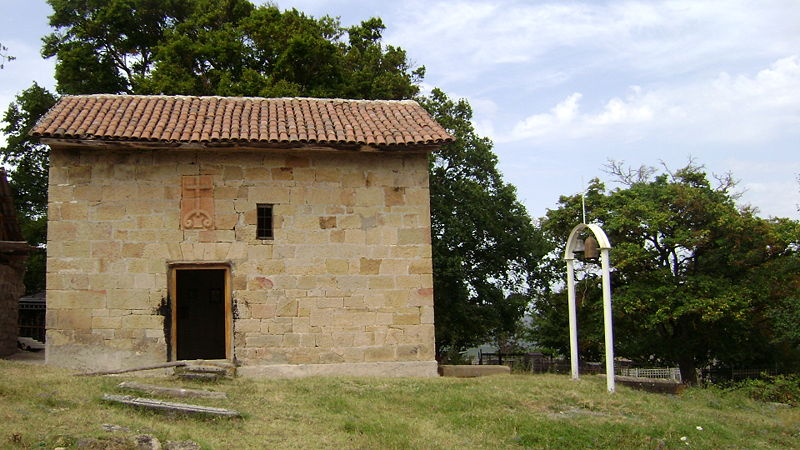
Saint George church in the village of Kempheri

Kemperi (Georgian: ქემფერი) is a village in Khashuri Municipality of Shida Kartli region in Georgia. The village is located 11.5 km (7.1 mi) from Khashuri and 6.5 km (4.0 mi) from Surami, 800 m (2,625 ft) above sea level. According to the 2014 census it had a population of 350.

== Sights ==
=== St. George's Church ===
The village of Kemperi is home to St. George's Church (Georgian: ქემფერის წმინდა გიორგის ეკლესია), which was built in 1880. The church is a basilica with a rectangular floor plan measuring 7.7 by 5.2 meters. It is built of dressed square stone. The building has two entrances, on its southern and western sides. The interior is covered with white plaster, and the roof is covered with clay tiles. Before the present church was built, an older and smaller church dedicated to Saint George stood on the site.

=== Zwerianis Saqdari ===
About 400 metres southeast of the Narwani quarter of Kemperi is another church known as Zwerianis Saqdari (Georgian: ზვერიანის საყდარი; "Zweriani's small church"). It dates from the Late Middle Ages. The church is almost destroyed, with only part of the altar remaining. The former basilica was built of dressed stone. A small window and two niches are preserved in the wall of the apse.

== See also ==
- Shida Kartli

== Bibliography ==
- Georgian Soviet Encyclopedia, X, p. 501, Tbilisi, 1985
