= Urtkva Saint George church =

Historic church in country of Georgia

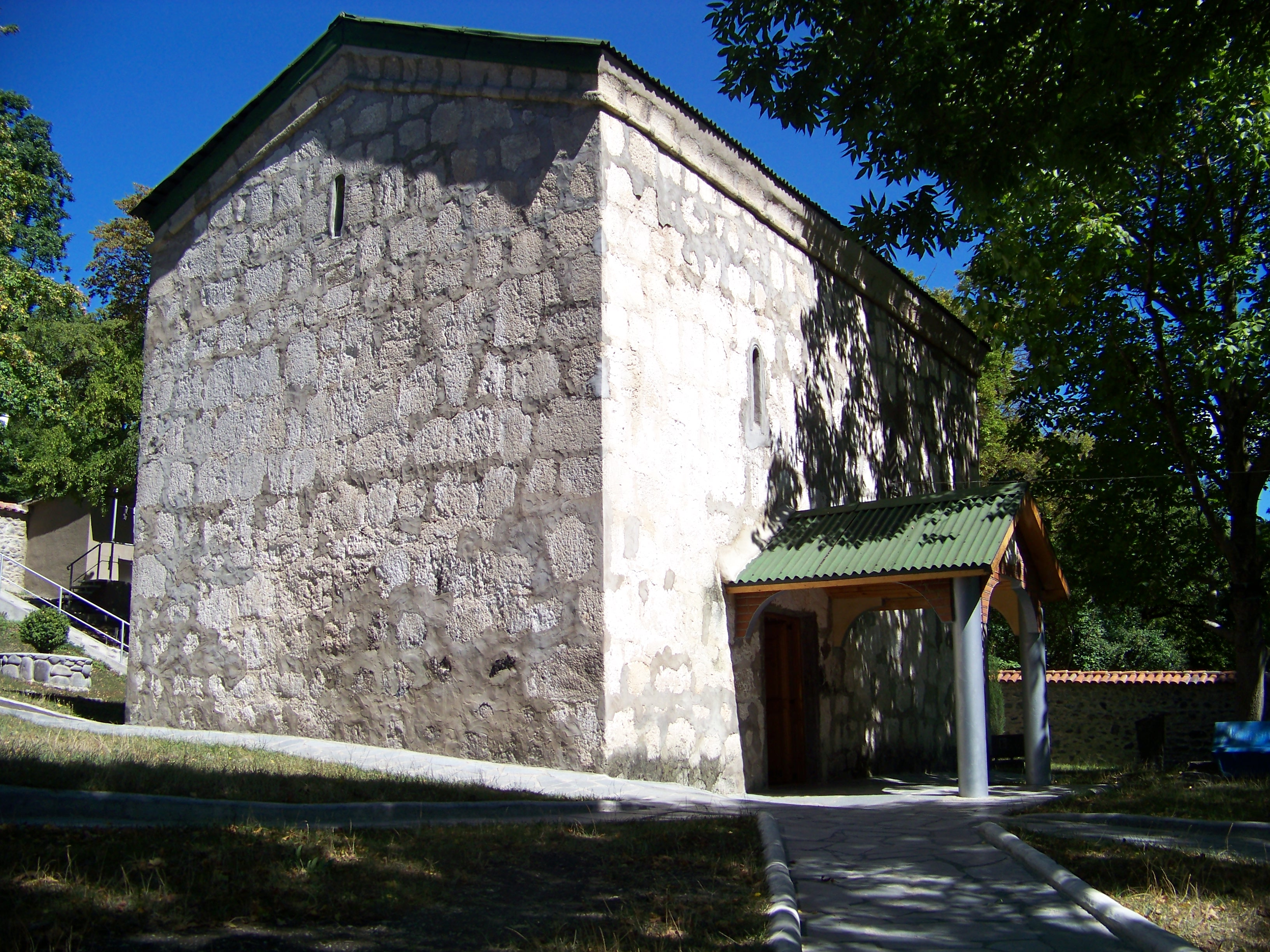
- Urtkva Saint George church.

- Location within Georgia

Religion
- Affiliation: Georgian Orthodox Church
- District: Khashuri municipality
- Region: Caucasus
- Status: Active

Location
- Location: Khashuri municipality, Georgia
- Coordinates: 42.045202°N 43.541920°E

Architecture
- Style: Georgian; Church

Urtkva Saint George church is a church in Georgia, in Khashuri municipality at the north of the village Urtkhva near the village graveyard.

The church is hall-type church (11.5 × 6.6 m) which was constructed by different size limestones. It has two entrances from the north and south. The apse is an incomplete circle, on the axis of the apse there is a window. There are also two windows on the north wall and one window on the west wall.

In two metres far from the church from the south, there was a bell-tower (3.5 × 3.5 m). It is dated back to early feudal era and it was built by lump stones and bricks. The construction was very damaged: the dome was collapsed, only pillars and arches built on those pillars were kept. From the north and east of bell tower there were fences built by lump stones.

In 2006, Urtkva Saint George monastery was indicated as a National Cultural Monuments of Georgia.
