= Ali (village) =

Village in Georgia

Ali ალი
- Location in Georgia
- Coordinates: 42°5′14″N 43°38′48″E
- Country: Georgia
- Region: Shida Kartli
- Municipality: Khashuri
- Elevation: 760 m (2,490 ft)

Population (2014)
  - Total: 1,068
- Time zone: UTC+4 (Georgian Time)

Ali is a village in Georgia, Shida Kartli region, in Khashuri Municipality. The village is located on the right bank of Cheratkhevi river, 25 km to the North-East from Khashuri. The epochal monuments are: Dedaghvtisa, Kviratskhoveli, Usaneti, Janiaurebi churches.

Ali was one of the advanced city of Middle Age Georgia. The reason of this development was its convenient geographical location. Ali advanced is a city in the 11th – 12th centuries due to the famous trade-caravan routes which passed through it and was a historic cross – road of Eastern and Western Georgia. From the North Ali was surrounded by Ali fortress and from the South – by Nabakhtevi fortress. In 18th century Ali was a royal town as well.

According to the historical sources, there was custom-house as well. That indicates that Ali was a trade city and had trading relations with other countries.

Archeological materials indicates that humans dwelled here from late Bronze Age.

== Literature ==
- ს. მაკალათია, ფრონის ხეობა, თბ., 1963 წ., გვ. 78–85
- ჟ. შარდენი, მოგზაურობა საქართველოში (1672-1673 წ.), თბ., 1935 წ., გვ. 82
- თ. ლაცაბიძე, ხაშურის რაიონის ისტორია ტოპონიმებში, 2000 წ.
