= List of rivers of South Ossetia =

Coordinates: 42°14′19.00″N 43°58′35.68″E

There are many mountain rivers in the territory of South Ossetia. The majority of them belong to the Kura drainage basin which flows into the Caspian Sea, the remainder are part of the Rioni River catchment which flows into the Black Sea. The Rachinsky and Lihsky ridges act as the watershed separating the drainage basins into these two seas.

List of rivers in order from the mouth:

← Left tributary
→ Right tributary

Kura

← Ksani
← Lehura
← Medzhuda
← Greater Liakhvi River

← Malaya Liahva
→ Patsa
← Tlidon

← Prone Vostochnaya

← canal Saltanis-Arhi
← Taliani
← Tilian

← Ptsa

→ Suramula

← Charathevi

← Prone

← Prone Srednyaya
→ Prone Zapadnaya

→ Lopanistskali

Rioni River

← Kvirila
← Dzhodzhora

→ Kvedrula

− lake Koz (Kvedi)

− Kvedikom

← Garula

→ Kozidon
← Liktsonandon

← Chanchahi

== Sources ==
Map Юго-Осетинская автономная область К — 38 — 64. Издание 1989 г.
