= Tskhramukha, Shida Kartli =

Georgian Village

Tskhramukha ცხრამუხა
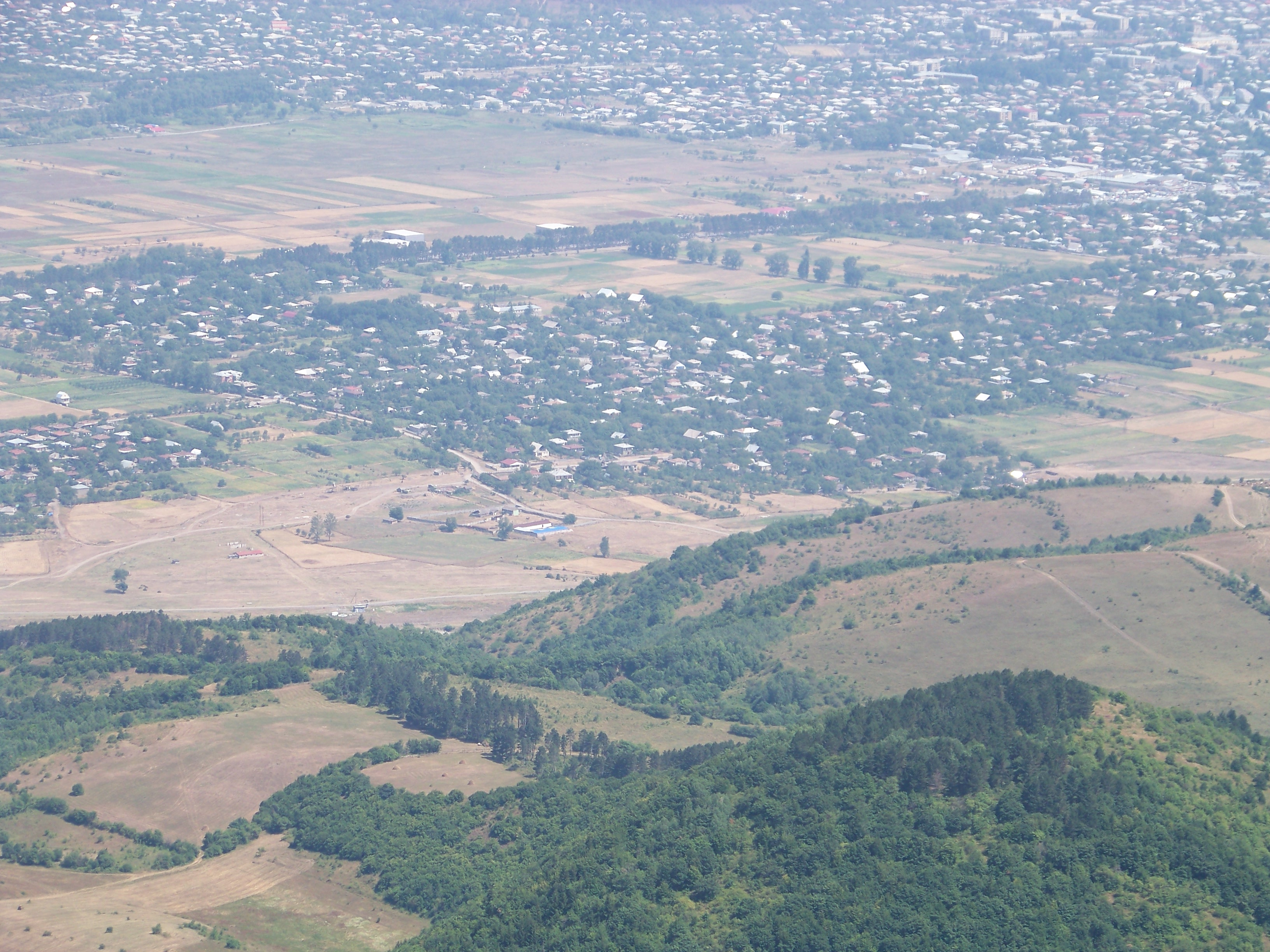

- Location within Georgia
- Coordinates: 41°58′39″N 43°34′51″E
- Country: Georgia
- Region: Shida Kartli
- Municipalities: Khashuri
- Elevation: 730 m (2,400 ft)

Population (2014)
  - Total: 1,728
- Time zone: UTC+4 (Georgian Time)

Tskhramukha (Georgian: ცხრამუხა, from ცხრა tskhra 'nine' + მუხა mukha 'oak') is a village in the Khashuri Municipality of the Shida Kartli Region of Georgia. Located on the left bank of the Kura River, 3 kilometers away from Khashuri.
