= Tagliani =

Tagliani is an Italian surname. Notable people with the surname include:

- Alex Tagliani (born 1972), Canadian racing driver
- Filippo Tagliani (born 1995), Italian cyclist
- Francesco Tagliani (1914–?), Italian footballer
- Lizy Tagliani (born 1970), Argentine actress and comedian
- Massimiliano Tagliani (born 1989), Italian footballer
- Nicolás Tagliani (born 1975), Argentine footballer
- Tiziano Tagliani (born 1959), Italian politician

== See also ==
- Taliani, disambiguation
