= Surami Synagogue =

Synagogue in Surami, Georgia (country)

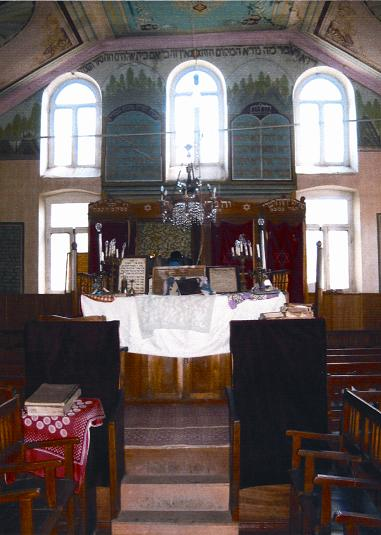
- The interior of the synagogue in 2008

- Location of the synagogue in Georgia

Religion
- Affiliation: Judaism
- Rite: Georgian Jewish
- Ecclesiastical or organizational status: Synagogue
- Status: Active

Location
- Location: Surami, Shida Kartli
- Country: Georgia
- Interactive map of Surami Synagogue
- Coordinates: 42°01′02″N 43°33′59″E

Architecture
- Completed: 1915

Surami Synagogue is a synagogue, located in Surami, in the Republic of Georgia.

== History ==
The synagogue was built in 1915. It is off the beaten path of tourists, but serves the local community. It has been a place of refuge during persecutions.

== See also ==
- History of the Jews in Georgia
