= Surami =

Surami სურამი
- Borough
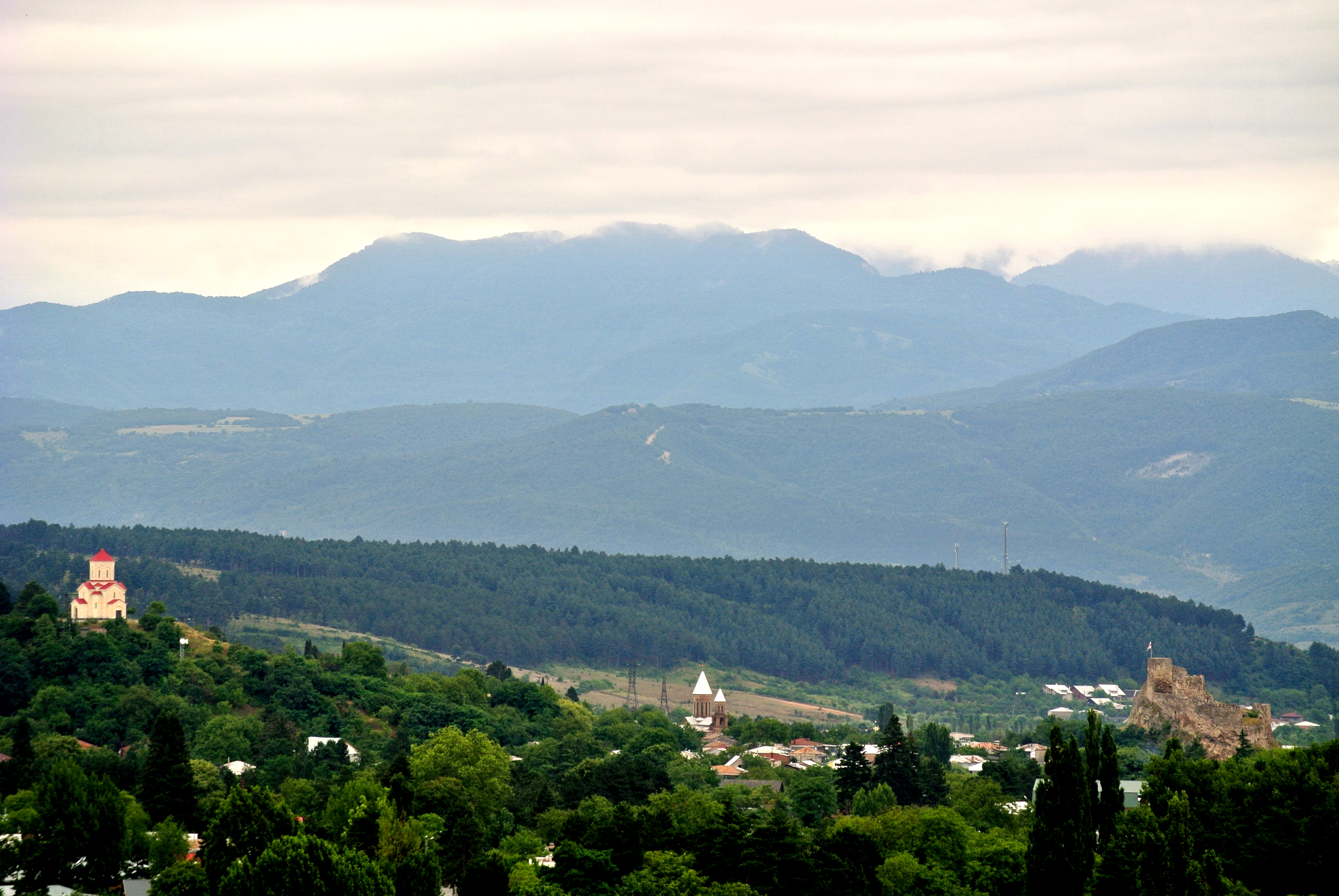
- Interactive map of Surami
- Location within Georgia Location within Shida Kartli
- Coordinates: 42°01′10″N 43°33′45″E
- Country: Georgia
- Mkhare: Shida Kartli
- Municipality: Khashuri
- Elevation: 740 m (2,430 ft)

Population (2014)
  - Total: 7,492
- Time zone: UTC+4 (Georgian Time)

Surami (Georgian: სურამი) is a small town (daba) in Georgia’s Shida Kartli region with a population of 7,492 as of 2014. It is a popular mountain climatic resort and a home to a medieval fortress.

== Location ==
Surami is located on the southern slopes of the Likhi Range (alternatively known as the Surami Range) which divides Georgia into its eastern and western parts, four km from the town Khashuri, to which Surami is connected through a railway spur.

== History ==
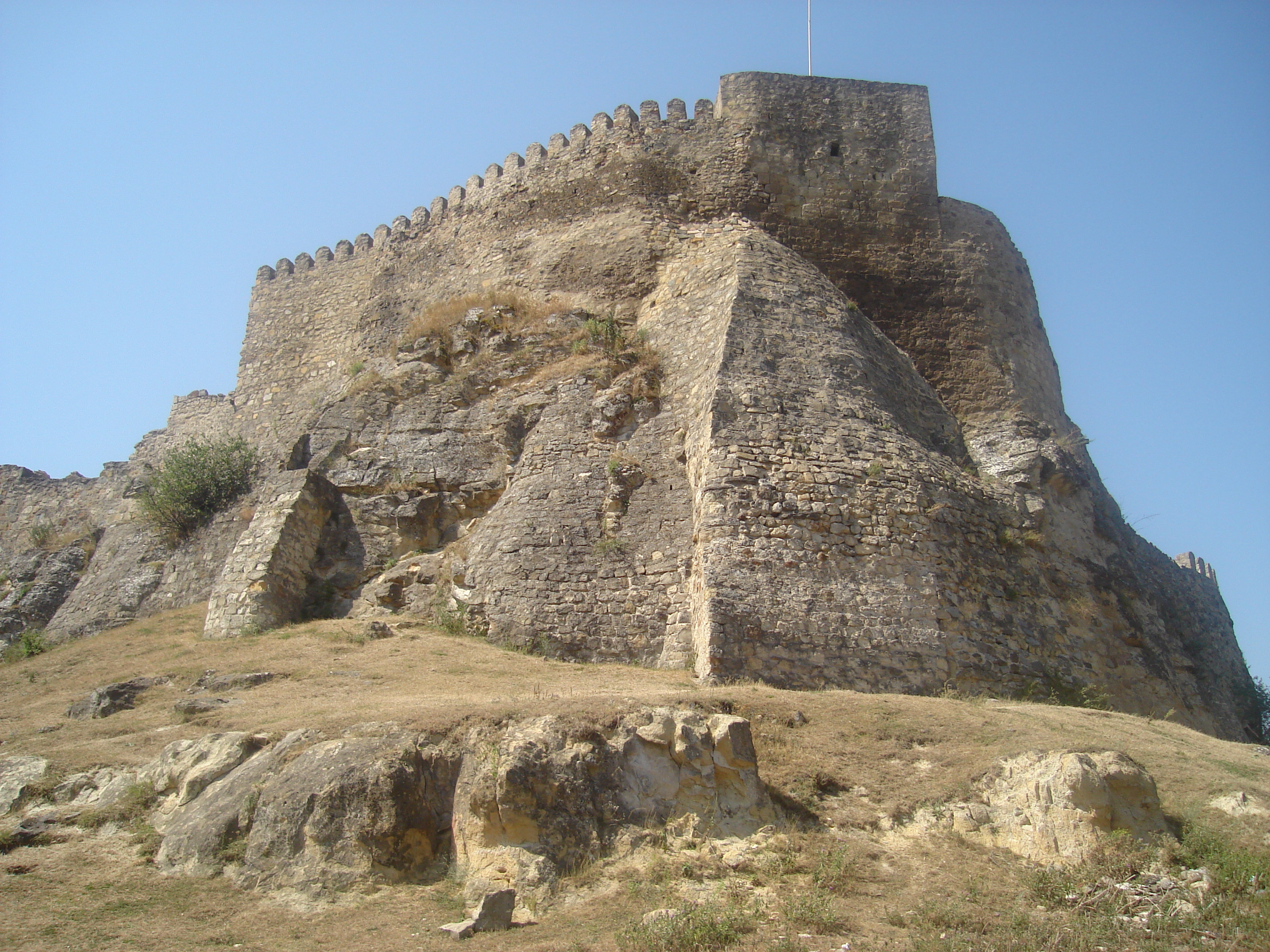
Ruins of the Surami Fortress

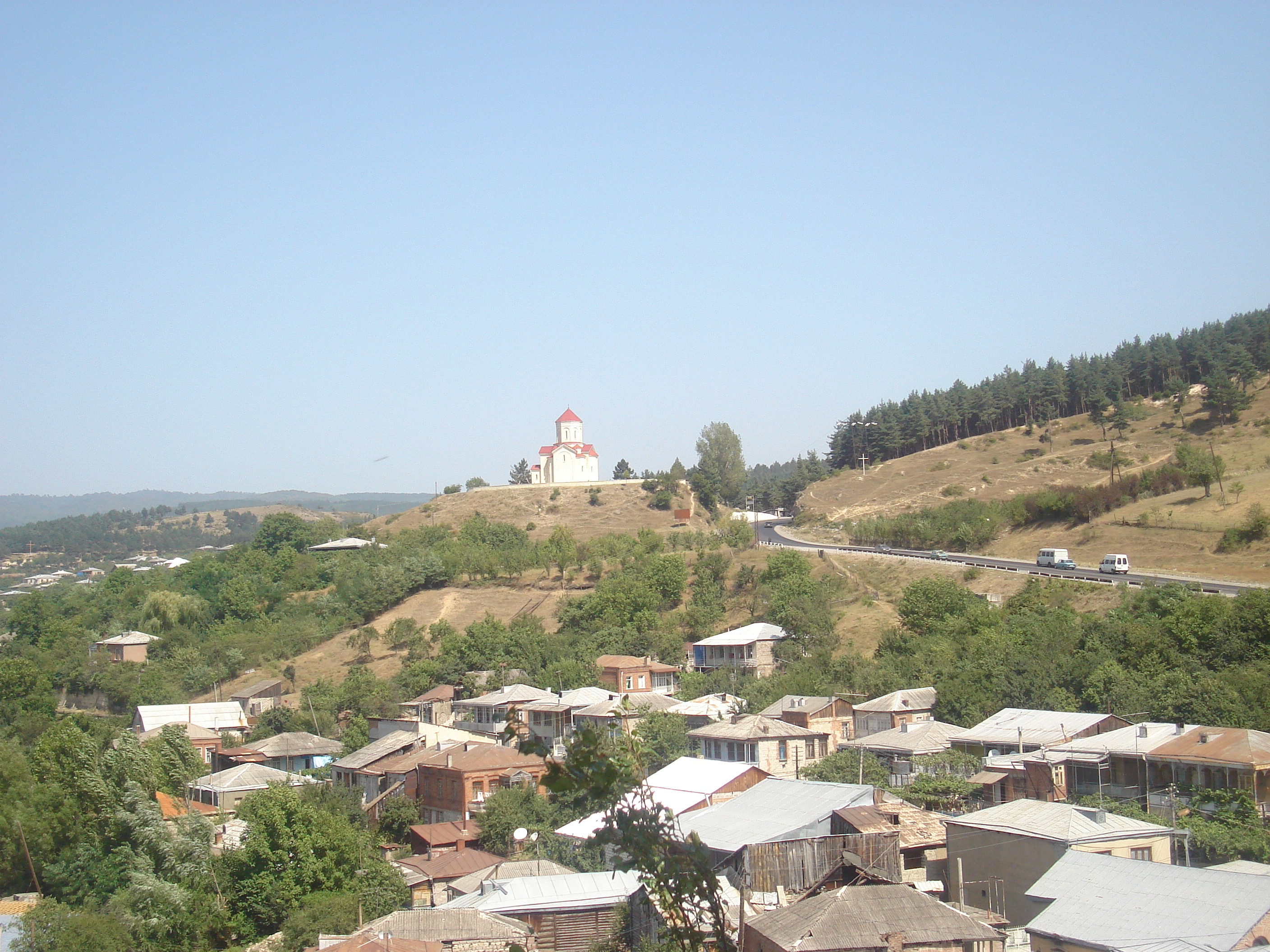
The north-western corner of Surami and the Kviratskhoveli Church

The first human settlement on Surami's territory dates back to the early Bronze Age. It is probably the Surium of Classical authors, specifically Pliny the Elder (AD 23-79), who place it in the eastern part of Colchis, towards Iberia.

Strategically located at the entrance into the Borjomi Gorge and guarding the road from eastern to western Georgia, Surami became a heavily fortified town in the 12th century. From the 1170s to the latter part of the 14th century, the fortress of Surami was a hereditary fief of the dynasty of the eristavs ("dukes") of Kartli (central Georgia), who assumed the surname of Surameli (სურამელი; literally, "[lord] of Surami").

Subsequently, Surami declined but retained its lively trading post as well as the fortress which was reconstructed in the 16th and 17th centuries. Following the reconstruction of the fortress under Rostom, the Safavid-appointed vali/king of Kartli, he deployed Iranian soldiers to serve as its garrison. By the mid-18th century, according to Prince Vakhushti, Surami had 200 households of Georgians, Armenians and Jews. In the 1740s, Surami was used by Prince Givi Amilakhvari as his base against King Teimuraz II and Persians. After the prince's surrender in 1745, the fortress was demolished, but later restored and exploited by the Russo-Georgian troops in anti-Ottoman operations during the Russo-Turkish War (1768–1774). After the Russian annexation of Georgia in 1801, Surami housed a military post and was later popularized as a mountain climatic resort. In 1926, it acquired the status of "urban-type settlement" (Georgian: daba).

== Monuments and attractions ==
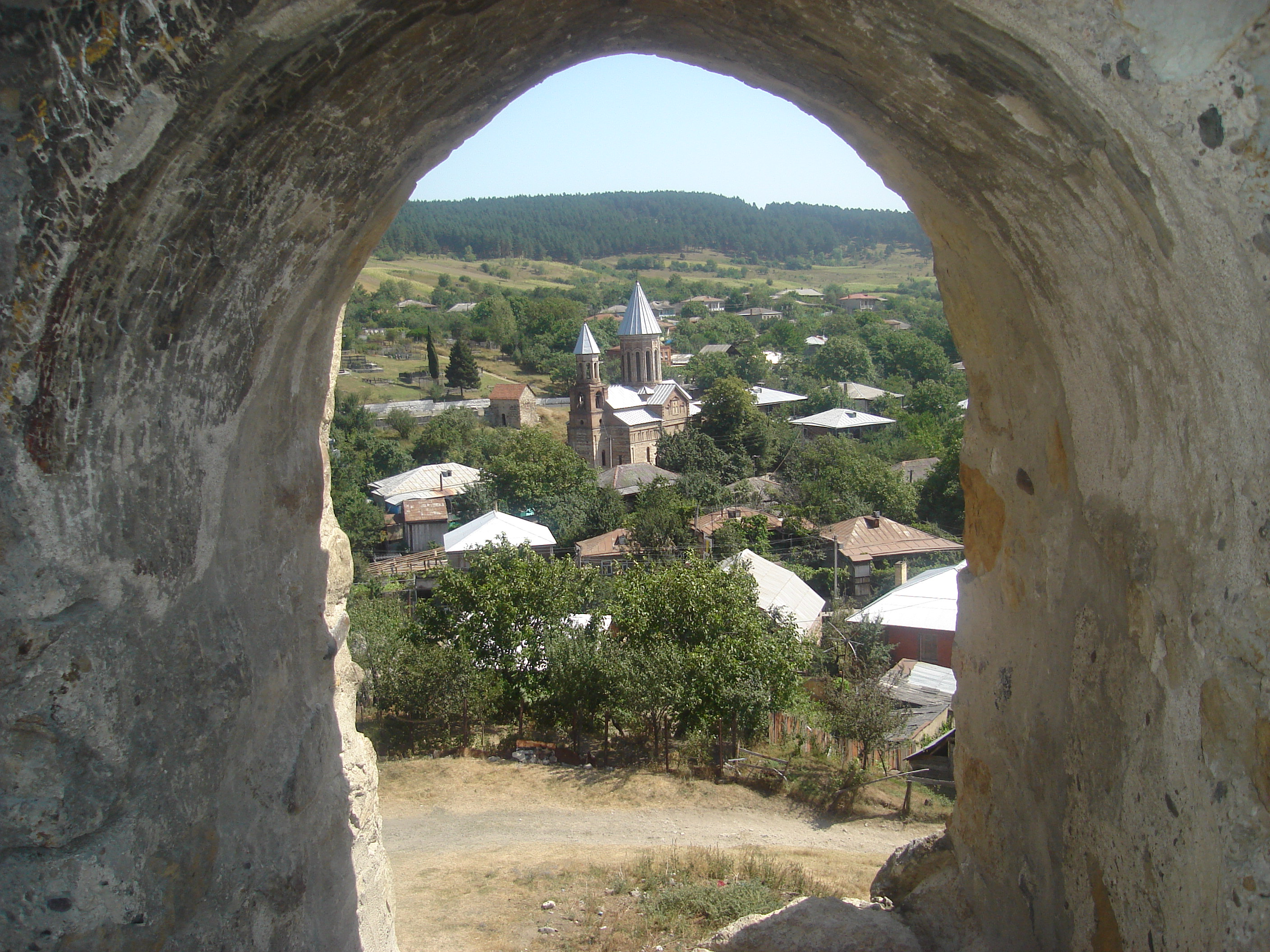
View of Surami's south-western part and The Mother of God Church from the Surami Fortress

Surami is adjacent to the Borjomi-Kharagauli National Park, noted for its diverse landscapes and abundance of historical monuments. The town itself houses The Mother of God Church complex constructed in the 16th-17th century, the 17th-19th century St. George’s Church and the Kviratskhoveli Church built in 1998.

The exact date when the Surami Fortress was built remains obscure. Its earliest structures possibly date to the 12th century, but it has been reconstructed several times since then. A local legend associated with the fortress was brought into classical Georgian literature by the writer Daniel Chonkadze (1830–1860) and further famed by the Armenian filmmaker Sergei Parajanov in his award-winning feature film The Legend of Suram Fortress in 1985.

The Museum of Lesya Ukrainka is dedicated to the memory of the notable Ukrainian poet Lesya Ukrainka (1871–1913) who spent her last months in Surami. The Museum consists of the house where the poet died, a library and Ukrainka's monument authored by the Georgian sculptor Tamar Abakelia (1952).

== Demographics ==
Historical population
Year	Pop.	±% p.a.
1770	1,000	—
1908	1,947	+0.48%
2002	9,773	+1.73%
2014	7,492	−2.19%
Source: Population data (1908), 2002 and 2014

== Notable people ==
- Itzhak Ilan (1956–2020), Israeli agent and former deputy director of the Israel Security Agency
- Bukhuti Gurgenidze (1933-2008) was a Georgian chess Grandmaster

== See also ==
- Shida Kartli
- Surami Pass
- Surami Synagogue
