= Itzhak Ilan =

Israeli security official (1956–2020)

- יצחק אילן
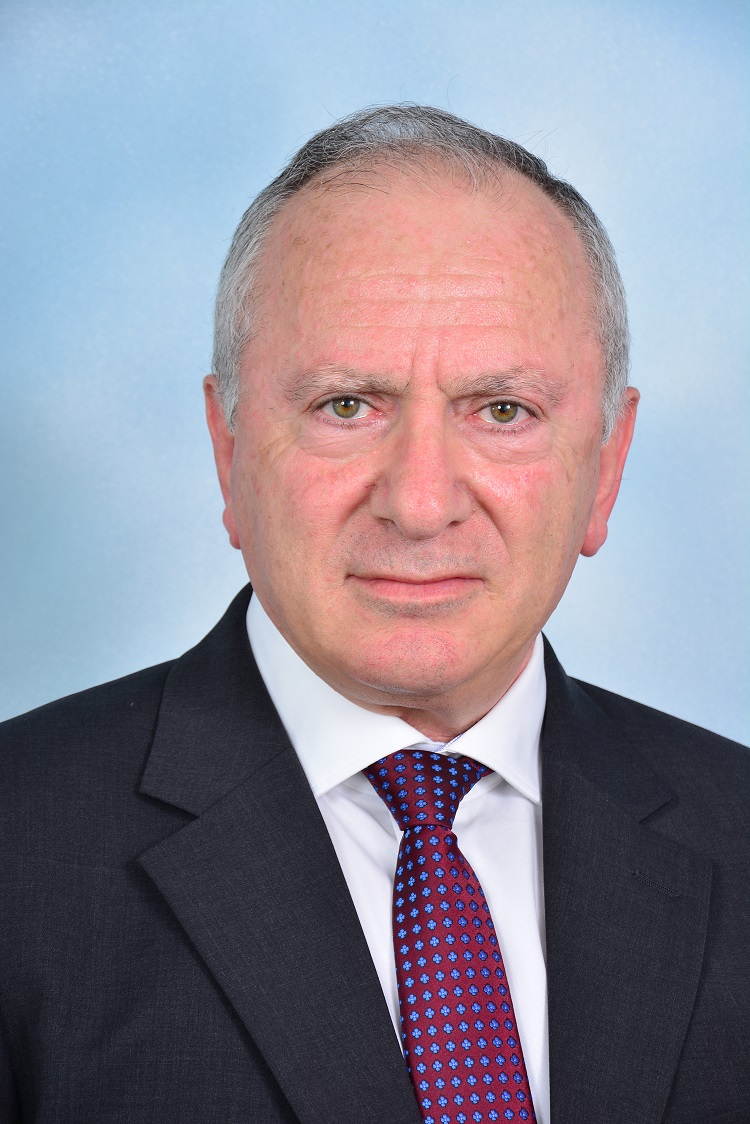
- Itzhak Ilan, 2016

Deputy Director of the Shin-Bet
- In office 2010–2011

Personal details
- Born: Itzhak Ilan; 28 July 1956 Surami, Georgia
- Died: 16 October 2020 (aged 64) Petah Tikva, Israel

Itzhak Ilan or Yitzhak Ilan (Hebrew: יצחק אילן; 28 July 1956 – 16 October 2020), served in the Israel Security Agency (a.k.a. ISA, Shin-Bet, Shabak) during the years 1982–2012, and served during his last position as the Deputy Director of the ISA during the years 2010–2011.

== Biography ==
Itzhak Ilan was born in the town of Surami in central Georgia on 28 July 1956.

In the summer of 1973, Itzhak graduated cum laude (with excellence) from the physics and mathematics engineers High School in Tbilisi, and immediately thereafter, on August 17, 1973, immigrated to Israel with his family and lived in Jerusalem.

During the years 1976–1980, Itzhak served in the Israel Defense Forces (IDF), in the anti-aircraft division of the Israeli Air Force. His last position in the IDF was as a Commander of the Anti-aircraft Artillery Battery Division of the Air Force, and he reached the rank of Lieutenant.

Ilan died on 16 October 2020, from COVID-19 during the COVID-19 pandemic in Israel.

== Service in the Israel Security Agency ==
In January 1982, Mr. Ilan was recruited to the Israel Security Agency, and began working in the Department for the Prevention of Russian Espionage.

In August 1985, Mr. Ilan was transferred to the Arab Sector, and after completing his education in the Arabic language and full training as an Investigator, he was posted in the Interrogations Division of the Judea & Samaria Region in the Ramallah Unit.

It was there that he was promoted to the position of Chief Investigator in Ramallah and Deputy Chief Investigator in Judea.

Between the years 1995–1997, Mr. Ilan served as the Head of the Gaza Desk, acting as the Chief Intelligence and Operations Officer of the Gaza Region. It was in this position that Mr. Ilan played a crucial and decisive role in the elimination of the top terrorist known as the “Engineer”, Yahya Ayyash, the chief bombmaker of Hamas and the leader of the West Bank battalion of the Izz ad-Din al-Qassam Brigades.

Mr. Ilan served for a total of 31 years in the Israel Security Agency, during which he climbed the Agency’s ranks and held an impressive number of top positions. From these it is worth noting the following prominent roles:

Commander of the Israel Security Agency in Samaria during the Second Intifada, during the years 2000–2003. It was during these years that Operation Defensive Shield was implemented, which dealt severe blows to the terrorist infrastructure in Judea & Samaria. During a 2013 interview with Alex Fishman, the Israeli newspaper Yedioth Ahronoth’s veteran military affairs correspondent, Mr. Ilan noted four important factors which led to the successful suppression of terrorism during that time:

- "The first factor was the physical entry to town centers and refugee camps.
- The second factor was the determination to eliminate terror. The Israel Defense Forces and the Israel Security Agency understood the need to destroy terror cells that took part in organizing suicide attacks. In this region I quickly realized that if we chase the lone suicide terrorist we will not succeed in getting anywhere; therefore, we focused our efforts against the elements producing the explosives and the commanders of the suicide cells. Within two years, they were either arrested or eliminated. That’s when the number of suicide terrorist attacks decreased significantly.
- The third factor was the construction of the separation wall, a physical obstacle to terror.
- And the fourth factor which brought about the current victory against terror was the death of Yasser Arafat."

Mr. Ilan was then promoted to the Chief of the Interrogations Division at the Israel Security Agency, a leadership position he held from 2004–2006.

As the Chief of the Interrogations Division, one of Mr. Ilan’s crucial roles was to manage and head the Special Interrogations Units of the Israel Security Agency, the Israel Police Force and the Israel Defense Force, which questioned Elhanan Tannenbaum, an Israeli reserve colonel in the IDF, when he was returned from his capture with the Lebanese terrorist group Hezbollah.

Thereafter he was appointed to the Chief of the Prevention of Terror and Espionage of Arab-Iranian Division (in the Arab Sector) during the years 2006–2008.

His last position as a Division Head was as the Chief of Israeli and Foreign Affairs Division during 2008–2010. Such Division is charged with the prevention of terror within the Jewish population, foiling Western (non-Arab-Iranian) espionage, safekeeping national Israeli security secrets and Security Classification. During his successes as Chief of Israeli and Foreign Affairs Division, Mr. Ilan was very instrumental in the capture of Jack Teitel, an American-born Israeli technician and serial killer.

At the beginning of 2010, Mr. Ilan was appointed to the top security leadership role of Deputy Director of the Israel Security Agency, and served in this position until his honorable retirement from the Israel Security Agency in September 2011.

Mr. Ilan spoke five languages, held a degree cum laude (with excellence) from a combined social science, economics, political science and sociology course from Bar-Ilan University, and held a master's degree in Diplomacy and Security Studies from Tel Aviv University.

Mr. Ilan competed with Yoram Cohen for the coveted, top position of Director-General of the Israel Security Agency in March 2011. He was not chosen to head the organization, despite the overwhelming predictions in his favor and the strong recommendation of Yuval Diskin, the ISA’s previous Director-General.
