= Taliani =

Taliani is a surname which may refer to:

- Adnan Al Taliani (1964), retired footballer from the United Arab Emirates
- Alessio Taliani (born 1990), Italian professional racing cyclist
- Emidio Taliani (1838–1907), Italian Cardinal of the Roman Catholic Church
- Francesco Maria Taliani de Marchio (1887–1968), Italian diplomat
- Reda Taliani (born 1980), Algerian raï singer and musician

== See also ==
- I-taliani, Italian television series
- Tagliani, disambiguation
