= Suramula =

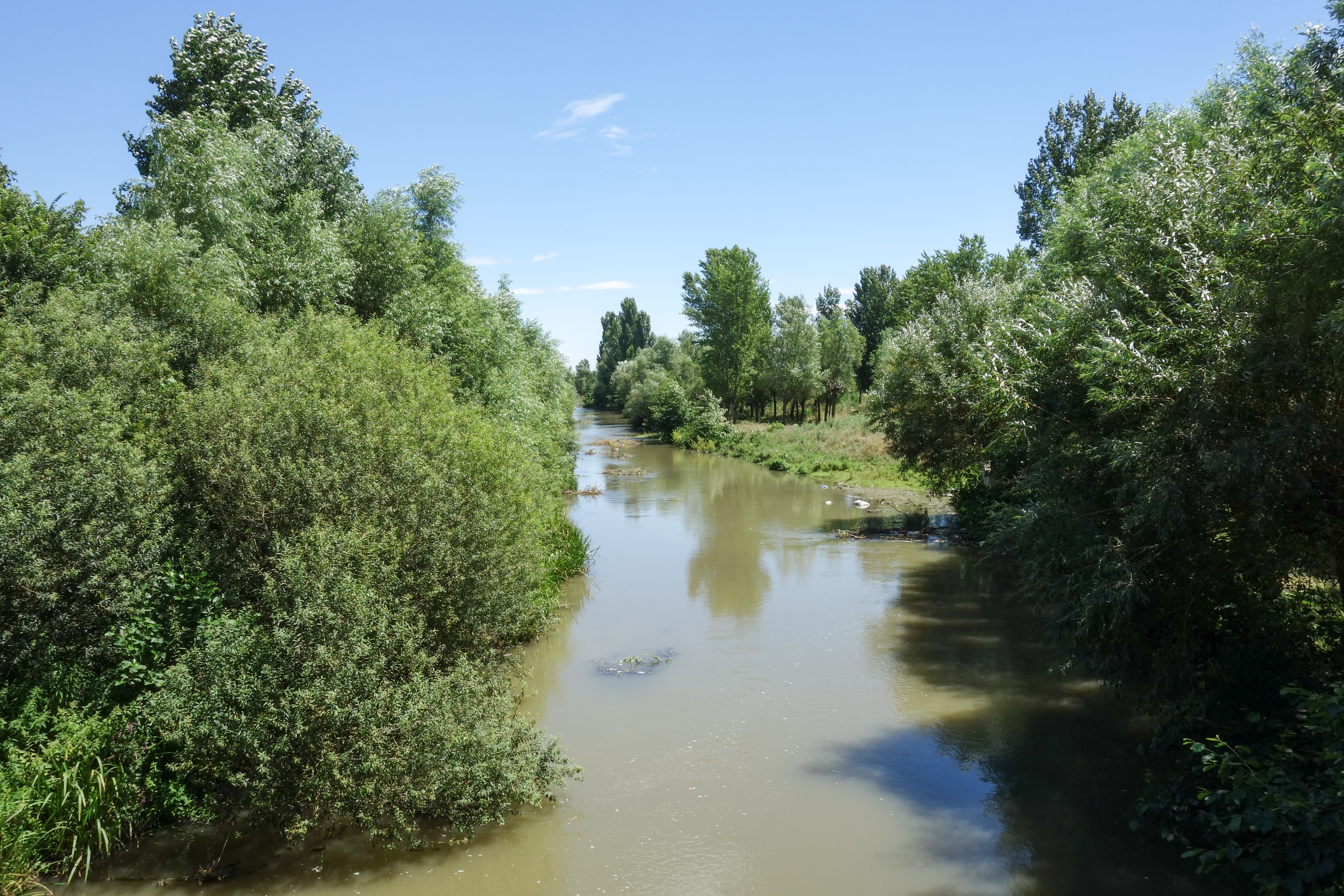
- Suramula near the village Kvenatkoca
- Native name: სურამულა (Georgian)

Location
- Country: Georgia

Physical characteristics
- Source: Likhi Range
  - coordinates: 42°11′54″N 43°29′54″E
  - elevation: 1,200 m (3,900 ft)
- Mouth: Ptsa
  - coordinates: 42.0504°N 43.8361°E
- Length: 42 km (26 mi)
- Basin size: 719 km^{2} (278 sq mi)

Basin features
- Progression: Ptsa→ Kura→ Caspian Sea

The Suramula (Georgian: სურამულა [s̪uɾämulä]) is a river in Khashuri Municipality, and a right tributary of the Ptsa, itself a tributary of the Kura. It starts at the left slope of Likhi Range, 1,200 metres (3,900 ft) above sea level, and runs a length of 42 kilometres (26 mi). The basin is 719 square kilometres (278 mi^{2}). This river is nourished by rain, snow, and groundwater. It is known to flood in the spring and in autumn, but it lacks water in winter.

This river is polluted with substances like nitrite nitrogen. It once was polluted with excessive amounts of iron, although this problem has since been fixed.

== See also ==
- List of rivers of South Ossetia
- List of rivers of Georgia
