= Francesco Tagliani =

Italian footballer

Personal information
- Date of birth: January 29, 1914
- Place of birth: Lomazzo, Italy
- Position: Midfielder

Senior career*
Years	Team	Apps	(Gls)
1932–1933	Torino (B team)		
1933–1936	Biellese	67	(20)
1936–1938	Varese	55	(15)
1938–1939	Ambrosiana-Inter	1	(0)
1939–1940	Atalanta	2	(0)
1941–1943	Abbiategrasso		
1943–1945	Legnano	25	(2)
1945–1947	Abbiategrasso		
1947–1949	Codogno		
- * Club domestic league appearances and goals

Francesco Tagliani (born January 29, 1914, in Lomazzo) was an Italian professional football player.
