= Khashuri Municipality =

Khashuri Municipality ხაშურის მუნიციპალიტეტი
- Municipality
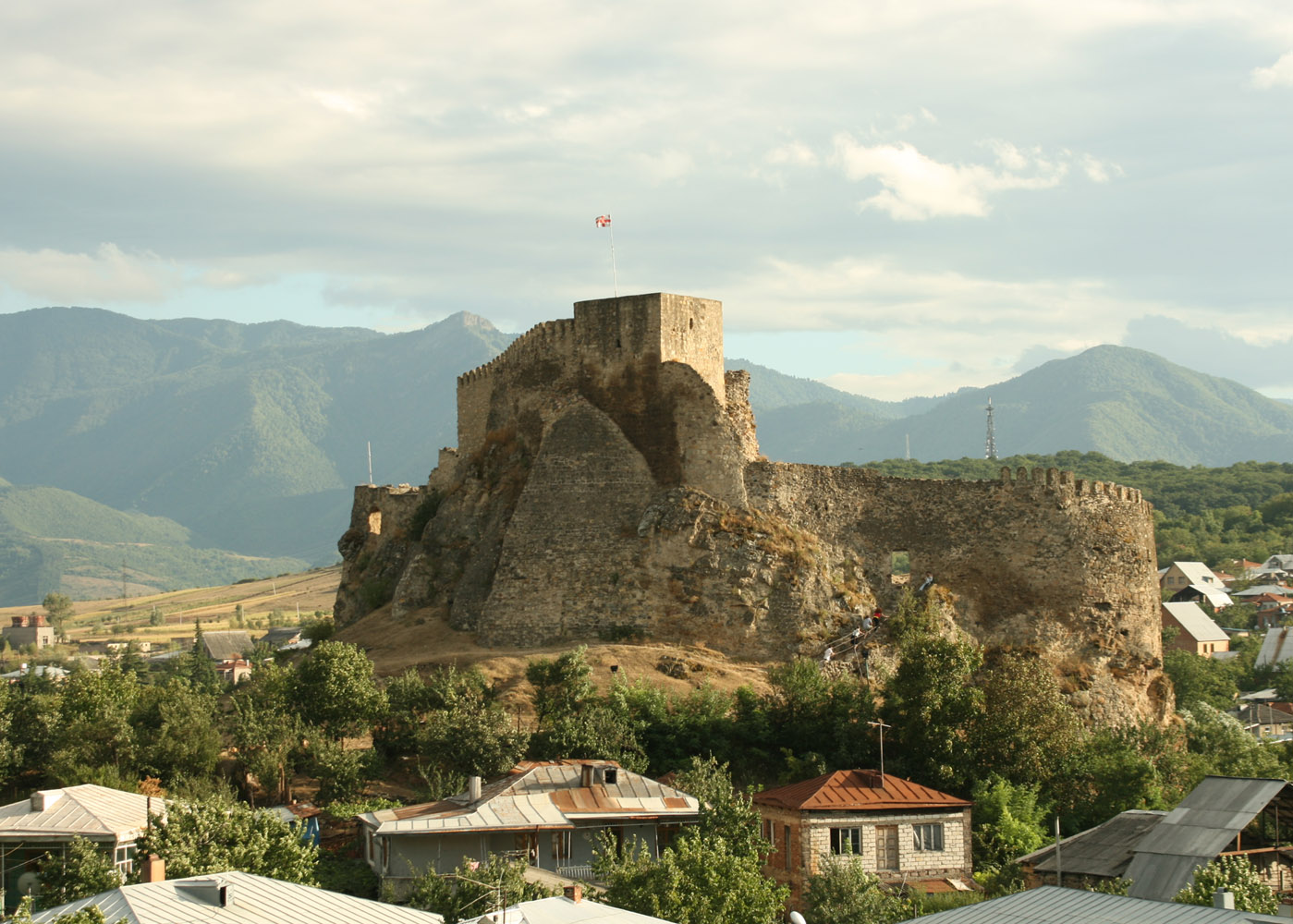
- Surami Fortress

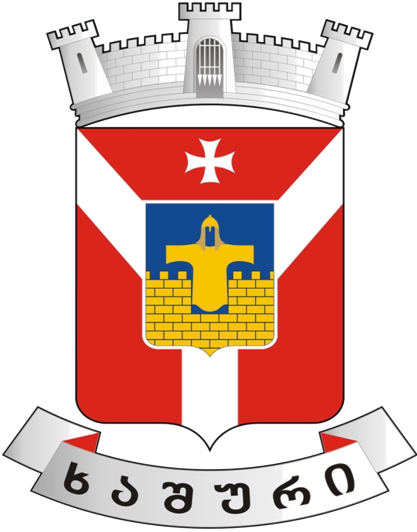
- Flag Seal

- Location of Khashuri Municipality in Georgia
- Coordinates: 41.9897°N 43.5900°E
- Country: Georgia
- Region: Shida Kartli
- Capital: Khashuri
- various: 1 city, 1 town, 70 villages

Area
  - Total: 582 km^{2} (225 sq mi)

Population (2014)
  - Total: 52,603
  - Density: 90.4/km^{2} (234/sq mi)

Population by ethnicity
  - Georgians: 98.3 %
  - Armenians: 0.6 %
  - Ossetians: 0.5 %
  - Russians: 0.3 %
- Time zone: UTC+4
- Website: https://www.facebook.com/KhashuriCityHall/

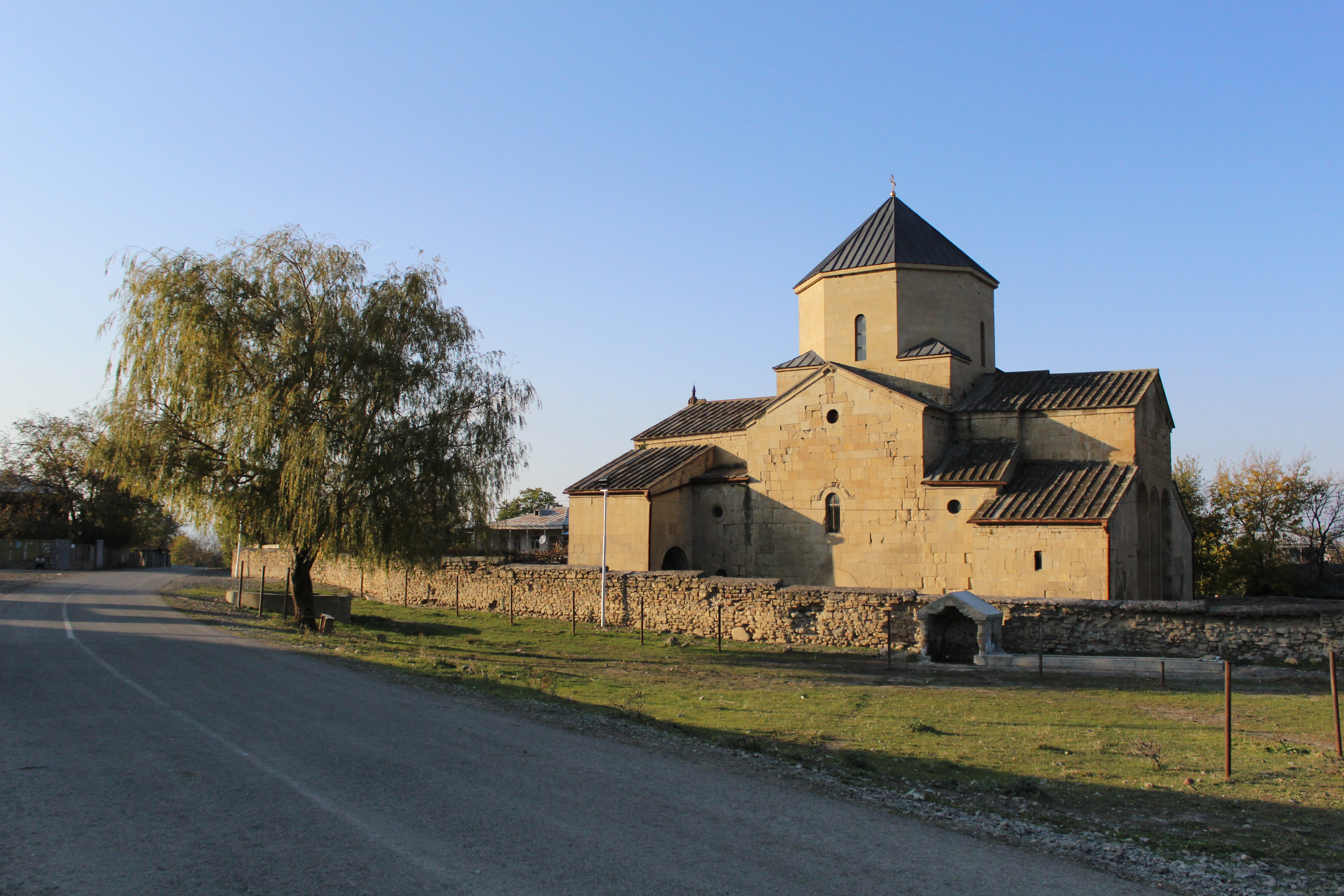
Tsromi church of amagleba

Khashuri Municipality (Georgian: ხაშურის მუნიციპალიტეტი) is a municipality of Georgia, in the region of Shida Kartli. Khashuri municipality is located at 690 meters above sea level. It is bordered on the east and north by Kareli Municipality, on the north by Sachkhere Municipality, on the south and west by Borjomi Municipality, and on the west by Kharagauli Municipality. Area of Khashuri municipality is 585.2 km^{2}. The total length of the boundaries of the municipality is 118 kilometers. Distance from the capital to Khashuri is 120 km, and from the regional center is 47 km. Khashuri Municipality also has a favorable strategic location, as it is located at the crossroads of Eastern, Western and Southern Georgia.

The municipality has a moderately humid subtropical climate. Knows moderately cold winters and warm summers. The main rivers are the Mtkvari and Suramula, which cross the municipality. Vegetation is varied from steppe to subalpine.

The industrial enterprises of the municipality are mainly concentrated in the city of Khashuri. The main fields of agriculture are: farming, viticulture, cattle breeding. The business sector in Khashuri Municipality is mainly represented by construction organizations, industrial organizations and large farming organizations. There are 32 state and 2 non-state general education schools in the municipality, there are libraries, a puppet theater and 3 museums.

== Population ==
The representative body of Khashuri Municipality is the Sakrebulo of the municipality, and the executive body is the Board. There are one urban (Khashuri), one Sadabo (Surami) and 11 rural administrative units (Ali, Gomi, Osiauri, Flevi, Kvishkheti, Tsotskhnara, Tskhramukha, Tsaghvli, Tsromi, Khalebi, Khtsisi) in the municipality, which include 84 more villages. The population is up to 65 thousand, most of them live in cities and towns.

The administrative center of the municipality is the city of Khashuri since 1921. The city-type settlement in Khashuri was founded in the 1960s, which was facilitated by the construction of a railway in Georgia. The main railway line Poti-Tbilisi passed through the territory of Khashuri. The main railway workshops were opened here, which were one of the largest enterprises in the Transcaucasia. From this period Khashuri is an important junction of the railway.

The majority of the population is Georgian, there are also Armenians, Jews, Russians, Ossetians, Greeks and Ukrainians.

=== Settlements ===
Rank	Settlement	Population
1	Khashuri	26 135
2	Surami	7 492
3	Tskhramukha	1 728
4	Kvishkheti	1 699
5	Ali	1 068

== Historic monuments ==
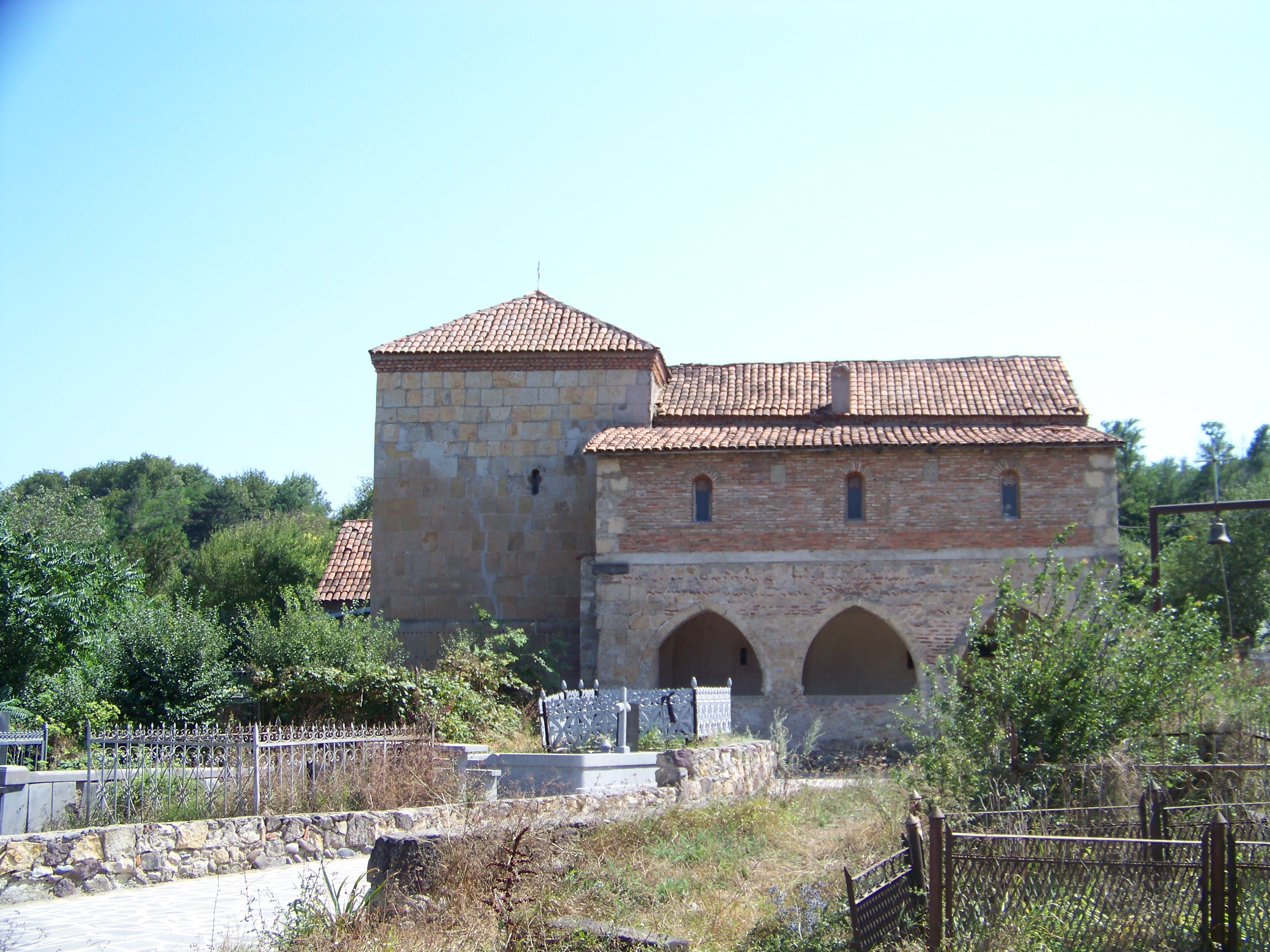
Church of Vaka

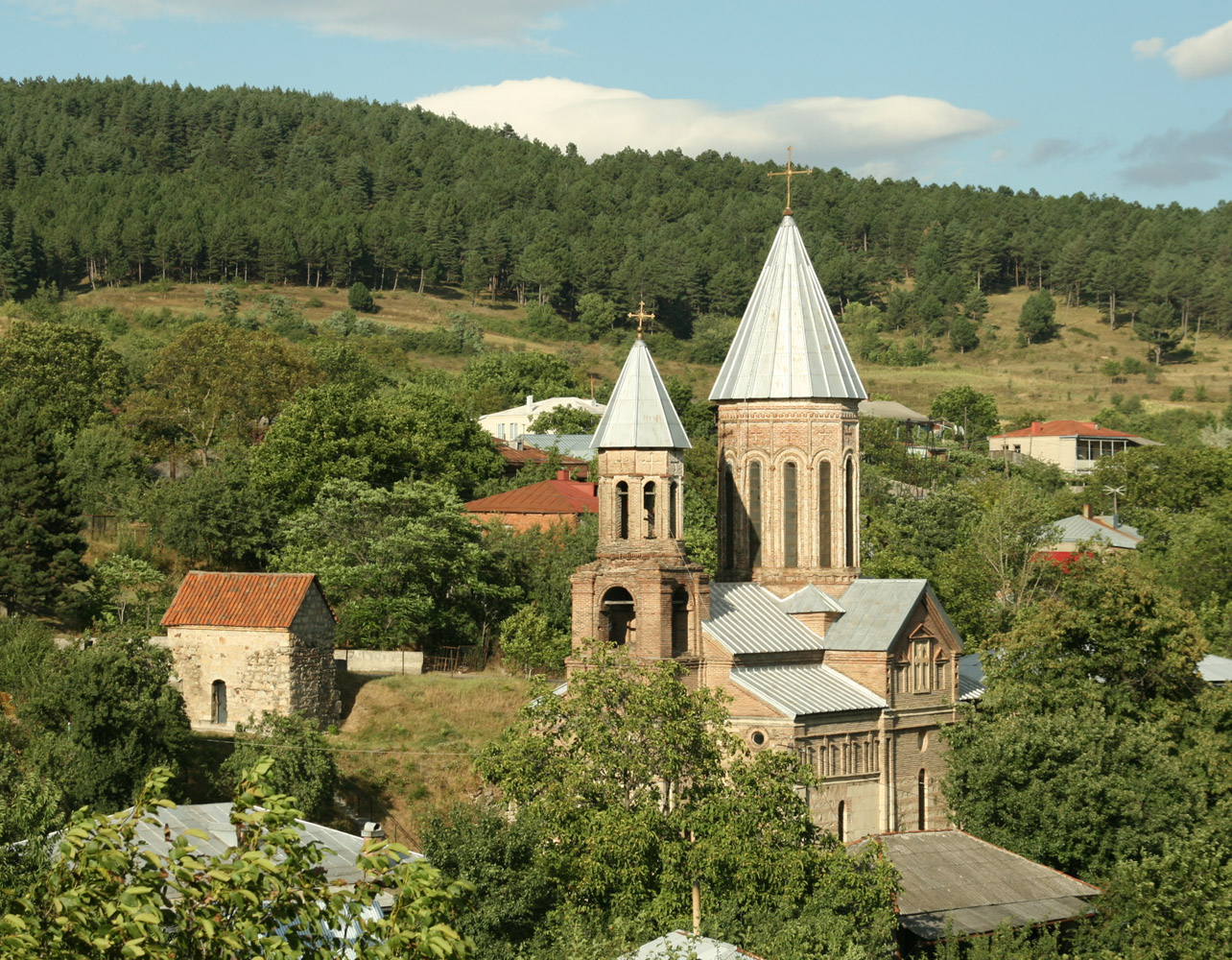
Church in Surami

Historical and architectural monuments located in the territory of Khashuri district are:

- Tsromi church
- Surami Fortress
- St. George Temple of Surami
- Kviratskhoveli Church
- Tsaghvli and Tsromi villages and others.

== Politics ==
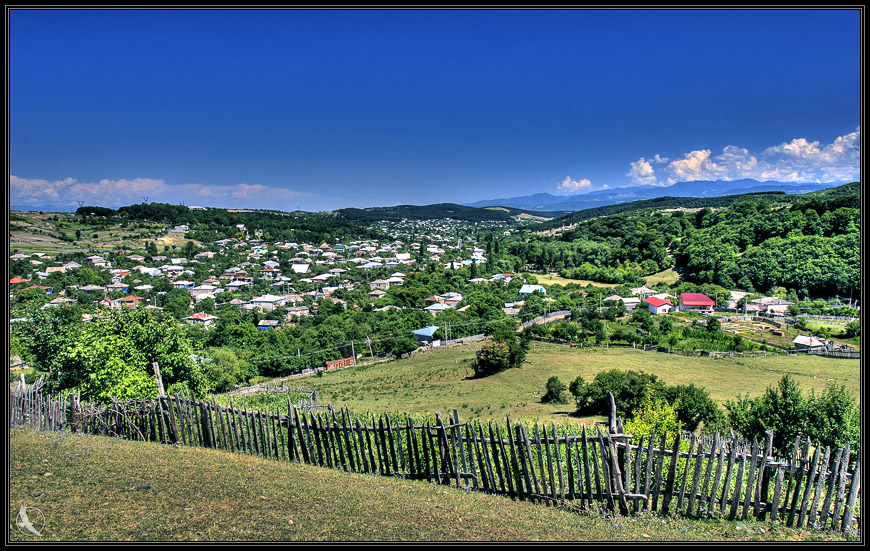
Village Chumateleti

Khashuri Municipal Assembly (Georgian: ხაშურის საკრებულო) is a representative body in Khashuri Municipality. currently consisting of 27 members. The council is assembles into session regularly, to consider subject matters such as code changes, utilities, taxes, city budget, oversight of city government and more. Khashuri sakrebulo is elected every four year. The last election was held in October 2021.

Party	2017	2021	Current Municipal Assembly
Georgian Dream	14	16	
United National Movement	3	8	
For Georgia	7 (Note: Split from GD.)	2	
Lelo		1	
Alliance of Patriots	2		
European Georgia	2		
Labour Party	1		
Independent	2		
Total	31	27	

== See also ==
- List of municipalities in Georgia (country)
