= Khashuri =

Khashuri ხაშური
- City
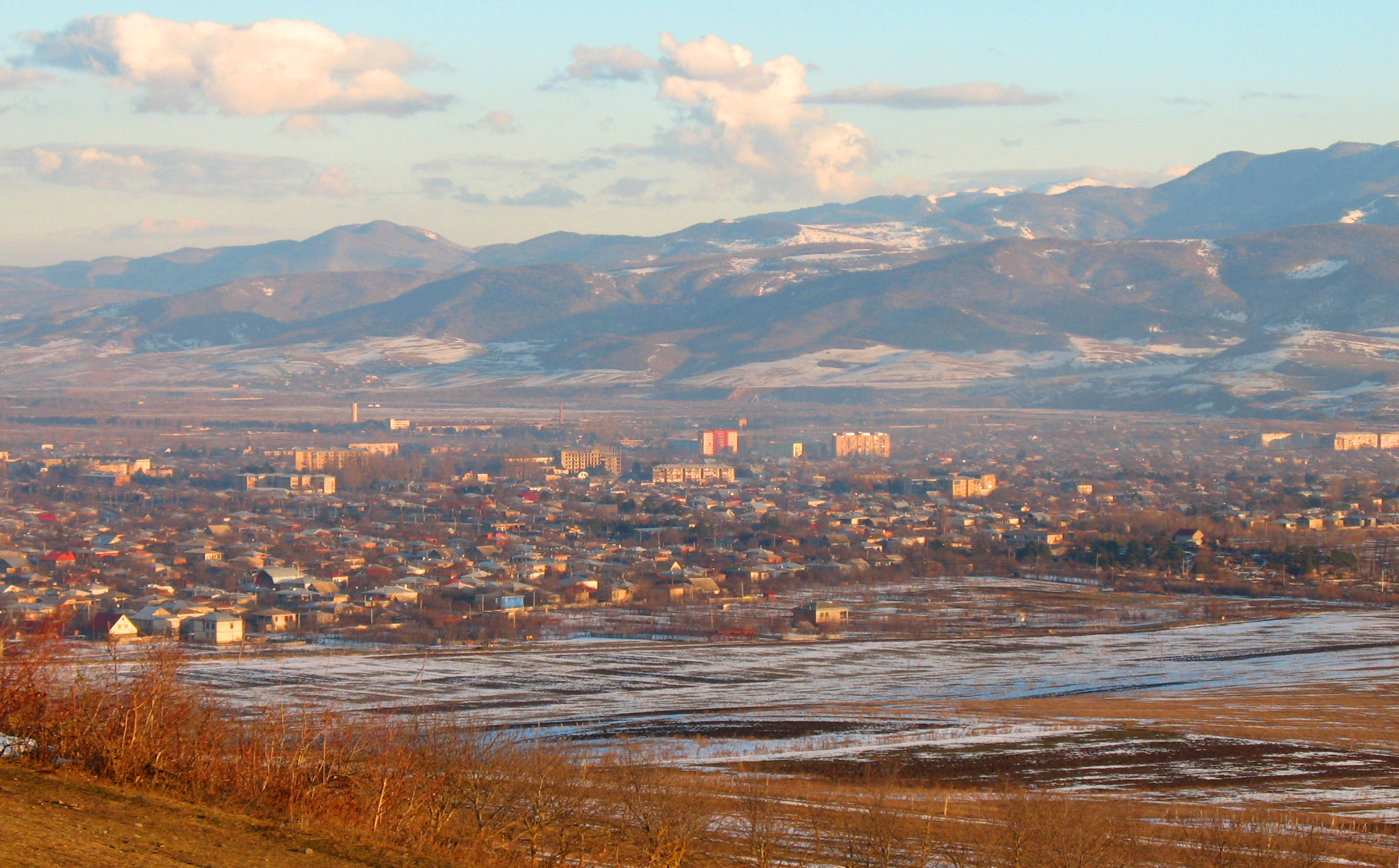
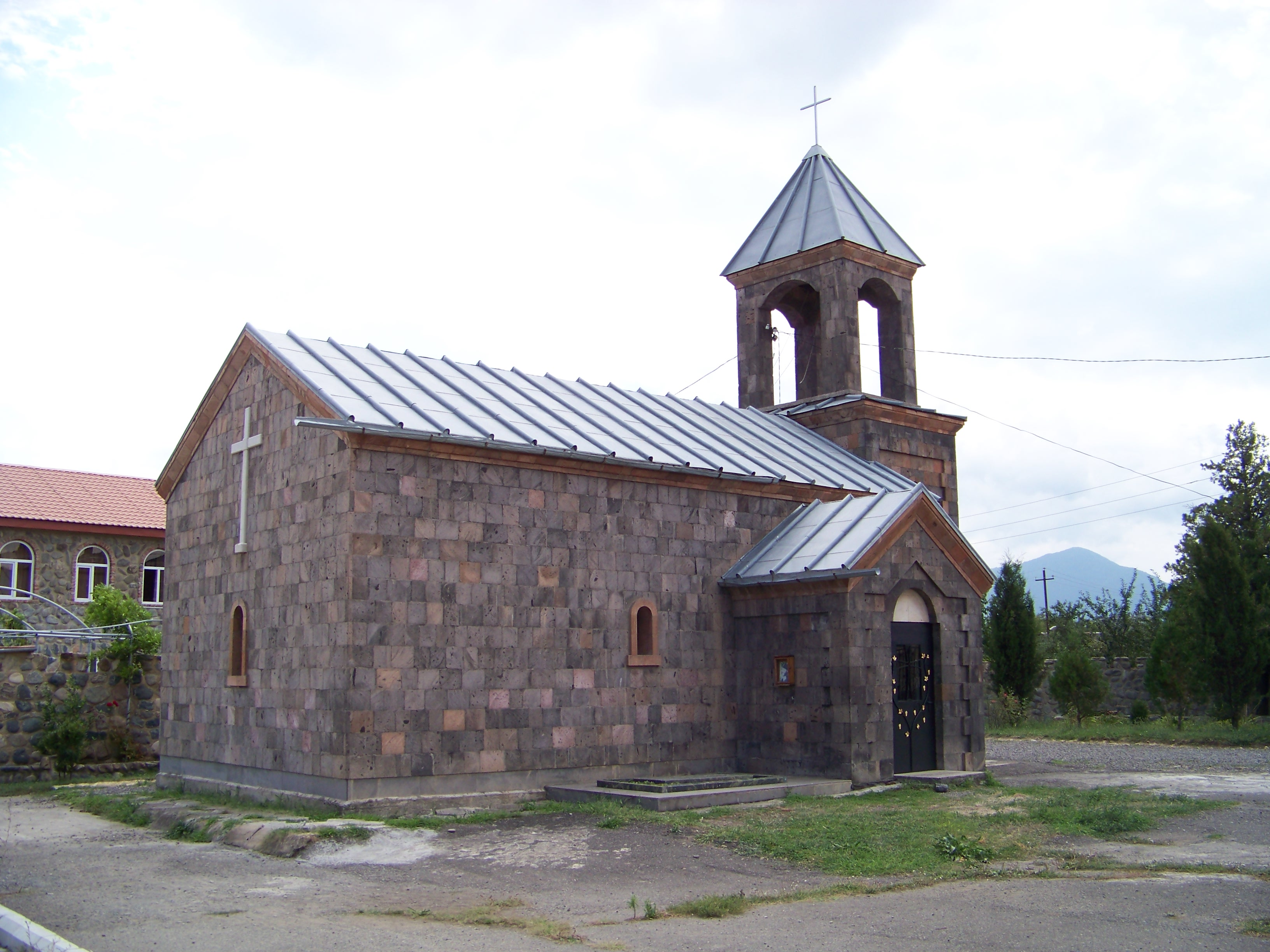
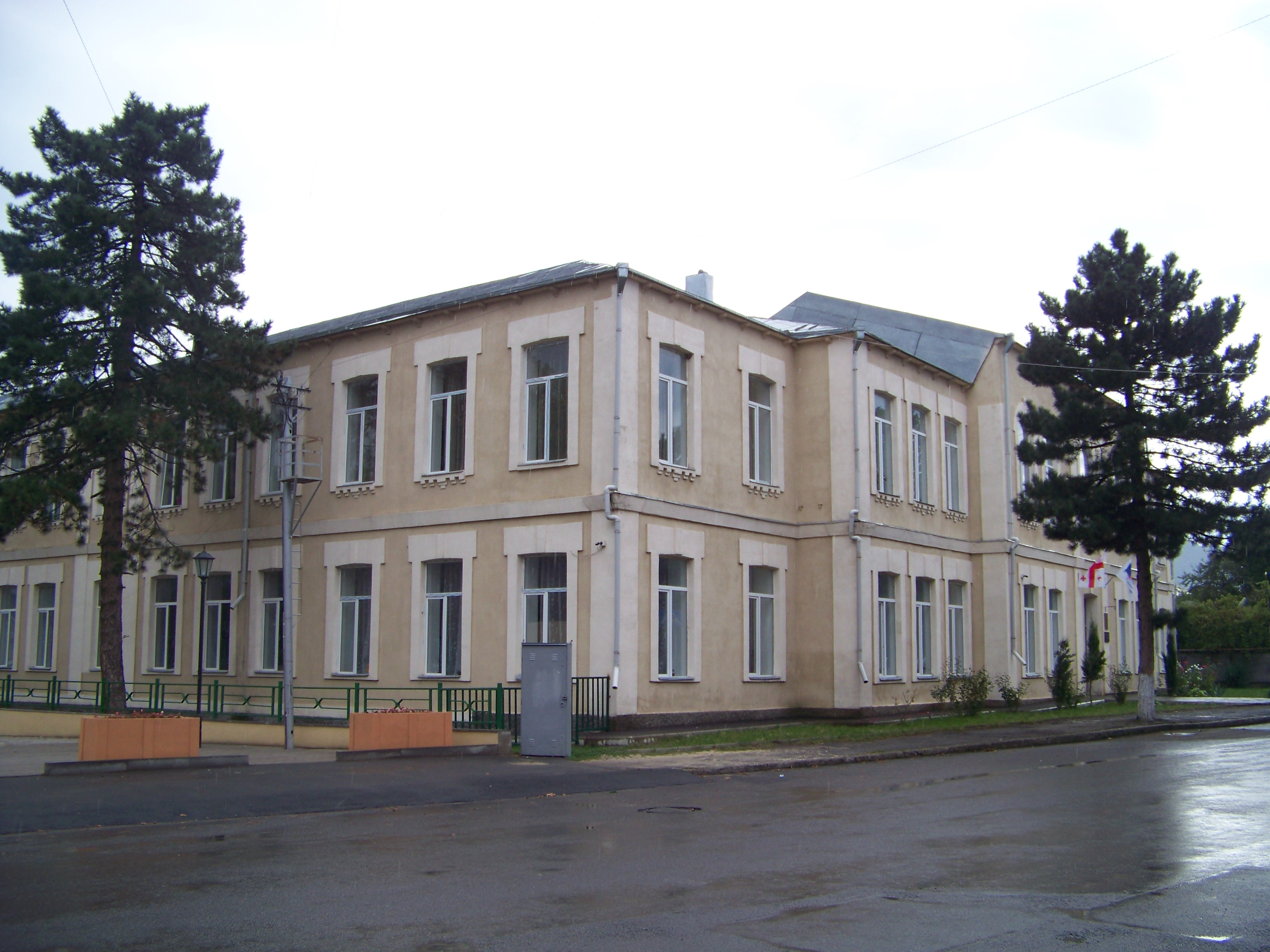
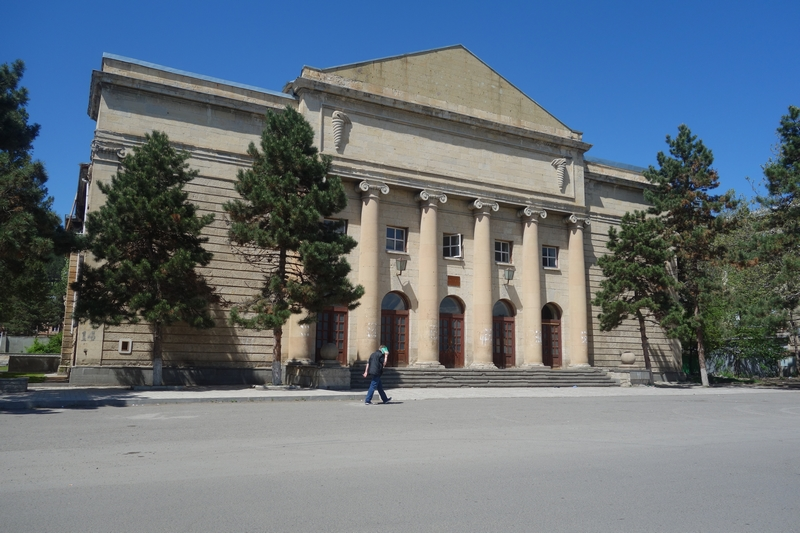
- Khashuri view church of St. Marine Khashuri Public school Old Theatre in Khashuri

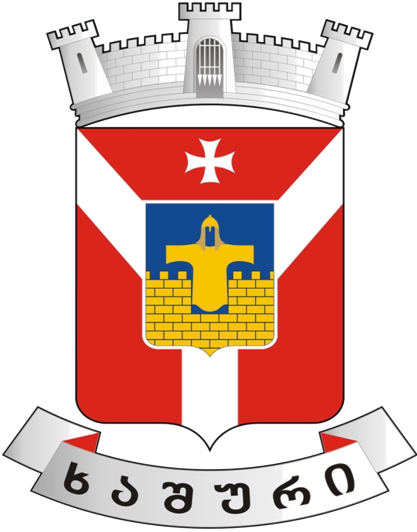
- Flag Seal
- Interactive map of Khashuri
- Location within Georgia Location within Shida Kartli
- Coordinates: 41°59′51″N 43°35′55″E
- Country: Georgia (country)
- Mkhare: Shida Kartli
- District: Khashuri
- Established: 1872

Area
  - Land: 11.9 km^{2} (4.6 sq mi)
  - Water: 0.3 km^{2} (0.12 sq mi)
- Elevation: 700 m (2,300 ft)

Population (January 1, 2024)
  - Total: 24,131
- Time zone: UTC+4 (Georgian Time)
- Postal code: 5700
- Area code: (+995) 368
- Website: www.khashuri.org.ge/en/

Khashuri (Georgian: ხაშური [χaʃuɾi]) is a city in the central part of Georgia and is the 9th largest settlement in Georgia. It is the administrative centre of Khashuri Municipality. It is located on the Shida Kartli plain, on the Suramula riverside, 700 metres (2,300 feet) above sea level.

Khashuri is first mentioned in a 1693 document. Modern Khashuri was founded in 1872 as a modest railway stop called "Mikhaylovo" after Grand Duke Michael Nikolaevich of Russia, Viceroy of the Caucasus. In 1917, it was renamed Khashuri. The city was granted city status in 1921. It was known as Stalinisi, after Joseph Stalin, from 1928 to 1934. In the 19th century after the leading Tbilisi-Poti main line, Khashuri gradually became a major transportation node. The railways and highways were heading towards Borjomi and Akhaltsikhe. The population of the city is 28.435 (2023). There is rail transport, glass container, food industry enterprises, educational and cultural institutions (public theatre, a museum of local lore). The 18th-century tower, St. John and St. Marine's churches are preserved in the city. There are the Surami and Khashuri residence in Khasuri.

== Climate ==
Climate data for Khashuri (1991–2020)
| Month | Jan | Feb | Mar | Apr | May | Jun | Jul | Aug | Sep | Oct | Nov | Dec | Year |
|---|---|---|---|---|---|---|---|---|---|---|---|---|---|
| Record high °C (°F) | 14.6 (58.3) | 20.8 (69.4) | 24.5 (76.1) | 29.9 (85.8) | 31.4 (88.5) | 37.2 (99.0) | 38.5 (101.3) | 38.5 (101.3) | 35.0 (95.0) | 29.0 (84.2) | 24.2 (75.6) | 19.2 (66.6) | 38.5 (101.3) |
| Mean daily maximum °C (°F) | 4.2 (39.6) | 5.8 (42.4) | 10.9 (51.6) | 16.5 (61.7) | 21.6 (70.9) | 25.7 (78.3) | 28.5 (83.3) | 29.2 (84.6) | 24.6 (76.3) | 18.4 (65.1) | 10.9 (51.6) | 5.4 (41.7) | 16.8 (62.2) |
| Mean daily minimum °C (°F) | −3.5 (25.7) | −3.1 (26.4) | 0.7 (33.3) | 5.0 (41.0) | 9.7 (49.5) | 13.8 (56.8) | 16.9 (62.4) | 16.8 (62.2) | 12.5 (54.5) | 7.2 (45.0) | 1.4 (34.5) | −2.3 (27.9) | 6.3 (43.3) |
| Record low °C (°F) | −19.5 (−3.1) | −19.0 (−2.2) | −11.8 (10.8) | −8.5 (16.7) | −0.4 (31.3) | 1.3 (34.3) | 6.4 (43.5) | 8.1 (46.6) | 1.1 (34.0) | −4.5 (23.9) | −12.5 (9.5) | −21.5 (−6.7) | −21.5 (−6.7) |
| Average precipitation mm (inches) | 46.6 (1.83) | 40.6 (1.60) | 43.0 (1.69) | 48.9 (1.93) | 67.9 (2.67) | 64.4 (2.54) | 39.0 (1.54) | 35.6 (1.40) | 41.2 (1.62) | 53.2 (2.09) | 62.6 (2.46) | 47.6 (1.87) | 590.6 (23.25) |
| Average precipitation days (≥ 1.0 mm) | 8.4 | 7.4 | 8.0 | 8.3 | 10.2 | 9.1 | 6.1 | 5.5 | 6.5 | 7.9 | 8.1 | 8.2 | 93.7 |
Source: NOAA

== See also ==
- Shida Kartli
