= S1 highway (Georgia) =

Trunk road in Georgia

S1
- საერთაშორისო 1
- Tbilisi-Senaki-Leselidze

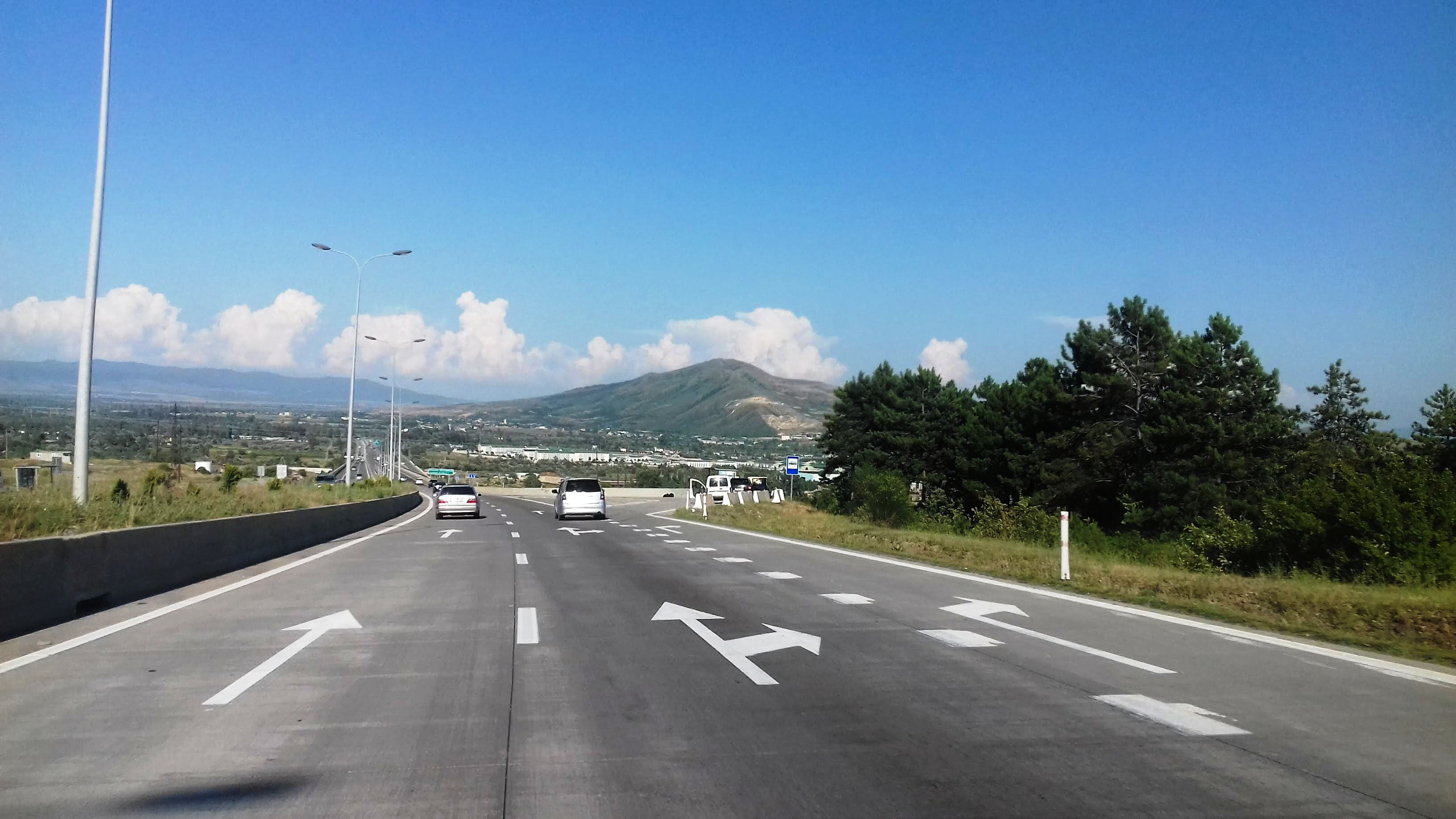
- S1 highway between Tbilisi and Gori

Route information
- Part of and
- Part of
- Length: 542.7 km (337.2 mi) Actual length 537 km (334 mi)

Major junctions
- East end: Tbilisi
- (km) 20 S9 27 S3 83 S10 120 S8 227 Sh104 (Kutaisi) 257 S12 291 S2 339 Abkhazia, closed for cars
- West end: Russian border (Russia)

Location
- Georgia
- Municipalities: Tbilisi, Mtskheta, Kaspi, Gori, Kareli, Khashuri, Kharagauli, Zestaponi, Terjola, Tsqaltubo, Samtredia, Abasha, Senaki, Khobi, Zugdidi, Gali, Ochamchire, Gulripshi, Sokhumi, Gudauta, Gagra
- Major cities: Tbilisi, Gori, Kutaisi, Zugdidi, Sokhumi

Highway system
- Roads in Georgia; International Routes; National Routes

The Georgian S1 route (Georgian: ს1, also known as Tbilisi-Senaki-Leselidze), is a "road of international importance" with a registered length of 542.7 kilometres (337.2 mi) within the Georgian classification system, which makes it the longest Georgian highway route. It runs from Tbilisi via Mtskheta, Gori, Khashuri, Zestaponi, Kutaisi, Samtredia, Senaki, Zugdidi, Sukhumi and Gagra to the border with Russia near Leselidze at the northwestern tip of the country, covering in practice 537 kilometres (334 mi). After crossing the Georgia–Russia border in breakaway Abkhazia, the highway continues to Sochi and Krasnodar as A147. It is part of European E60, E97 and E117 routes and Asian Highways AH5, AH81 and AH82, and connects with six other S-routes.

North of Zugdidi, across the Enguri River which is the disputed Abkhazia–Georgia border, the remaining 198 kilometres (123 mi) of the S1 route through breakaway Abkhazia is not under central Georgian control. Crossing into Abkhazia from Georgian controlled territory (and vice versa) is not possible by car, only by foot via the Enguri Bridge which is part of the S1 route. The road reaches its highest point of 910 m (2,990 ft) above sea level at the southern portal of the Rikoti Tunnel, which opened in 1982. This is the longest vehicular tunnel entirely within Georgia and has a length of 1,722 m (1.070 mi).

While the majority of the S1 highway is a two-lane road, major parts have been rebuilt since 2006 as 2x2 motorway/expressway, specifically Tbilisi to Surami (105 km (65 mi)) and Zestaponi (Argveta) to Samtredia (57 km (35 mi)). The redesign of the trunk section of the S1 between Tbilisi and Samtredia to motorway or expressway standards is part of the East-West Highway project, a major investment into Georgia's international road connectivity. As of 2021 the mountainous 51 km (32 mi) "Rikoti Pass Road" and the remaining 6 km (3.7 mi) of the Khashuri Bypass are under construction as 2x2 expressway and are expected to be completed by 2023.

== Background ==
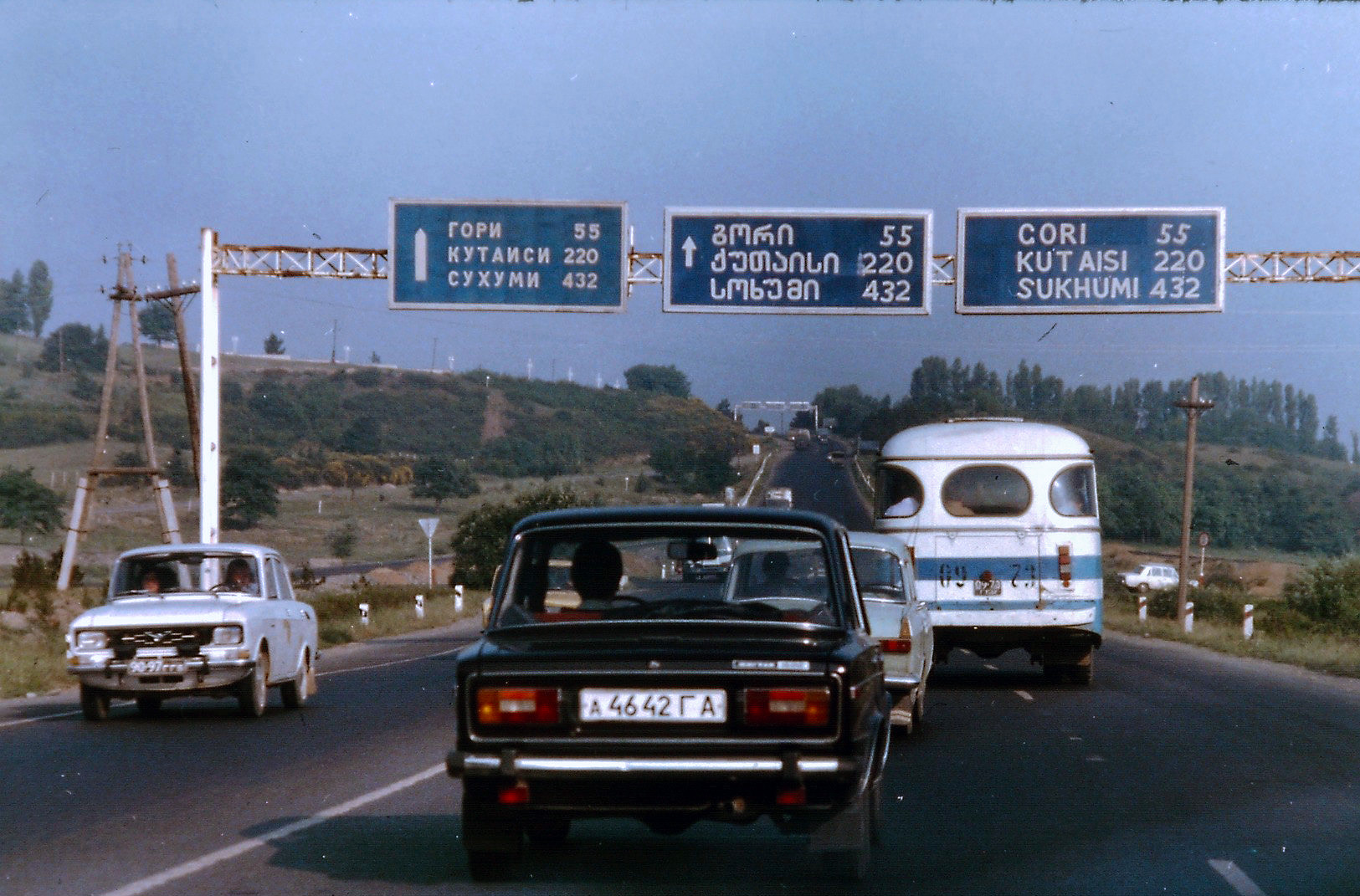
Soviet M27 Tbilisi-Gori near Natakhtari in early 1980s Georgian SSR. Note the three scripts on the signs. Nowadays it is Georgian and Latin

In the 1980s the current S1 route was entirely part of the Soviet M27 highway route that ran from Baku via Tbilisi to Novorossiysk. The Russian part of that M27 existed until 2018 when it got renumbered as A147 highway. Prior to the 1980s, the route of the current S1 was composed of the 17 (Tbilisi to Samtredia) and the 19 (Samtredia to Leselidze) highways.

After Georgia regained independence in 1991, the M27 designation was maintained until 1996 when the current route numbering system was adopted. In the 1996 ordinance "Indicators and List for Determination of International, Domestic and Local Roads of Georgia" the S1 route was recorded as the "S1 Tbilisi - Senaki - Leselidze (Russian border)" with an original length of 552 kilometres (343 mi). Since, the route has been shortened by 15 kilometres (9.3 mi) to 537 kilometres (334 mi) due to realignment of the road.

The S1 has been a two lane highway prior to the inception of the East-West Highway project in 2005, with the exception of Tbilisi city and the subsequent 11 km (6.8 mi) along Mtskheta to the S3 junction near Natakhtari which have been multilane since earlier years. In the 1980s expansion of the (then M27) highway to four lanes was envisioned and ground works had already started until Igoeti when the Soviet Union collapsed and Georgia became independent. This and the turbulent 1990s in Georgia interrupted these plans, which were picked up again after the 2003 Rose Revolution. Around 2004 the junction with the S3 highway near Natakhtari was upgraded with grade-separation.

== East-West Highway ==
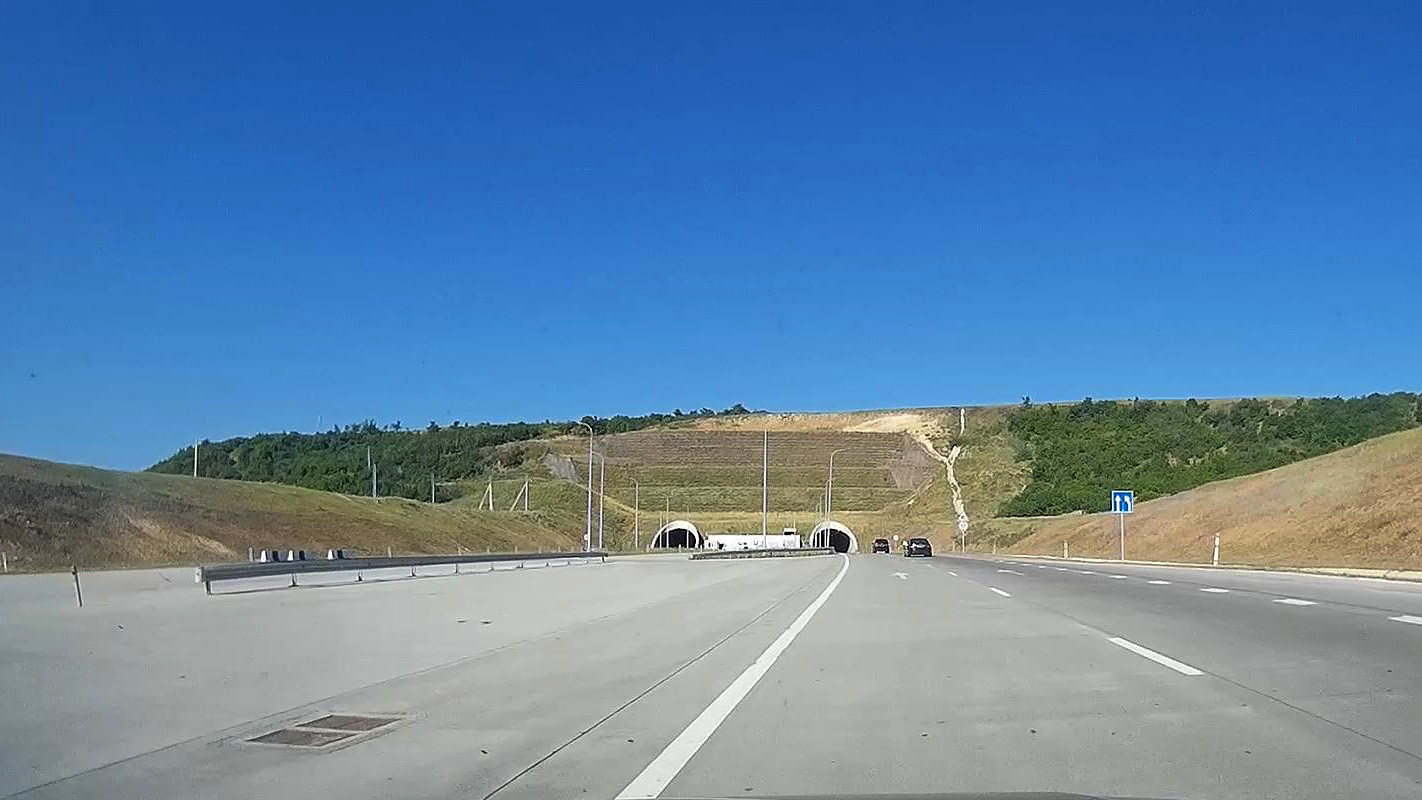
In 2011 the Gori Tunnel (800m) opened

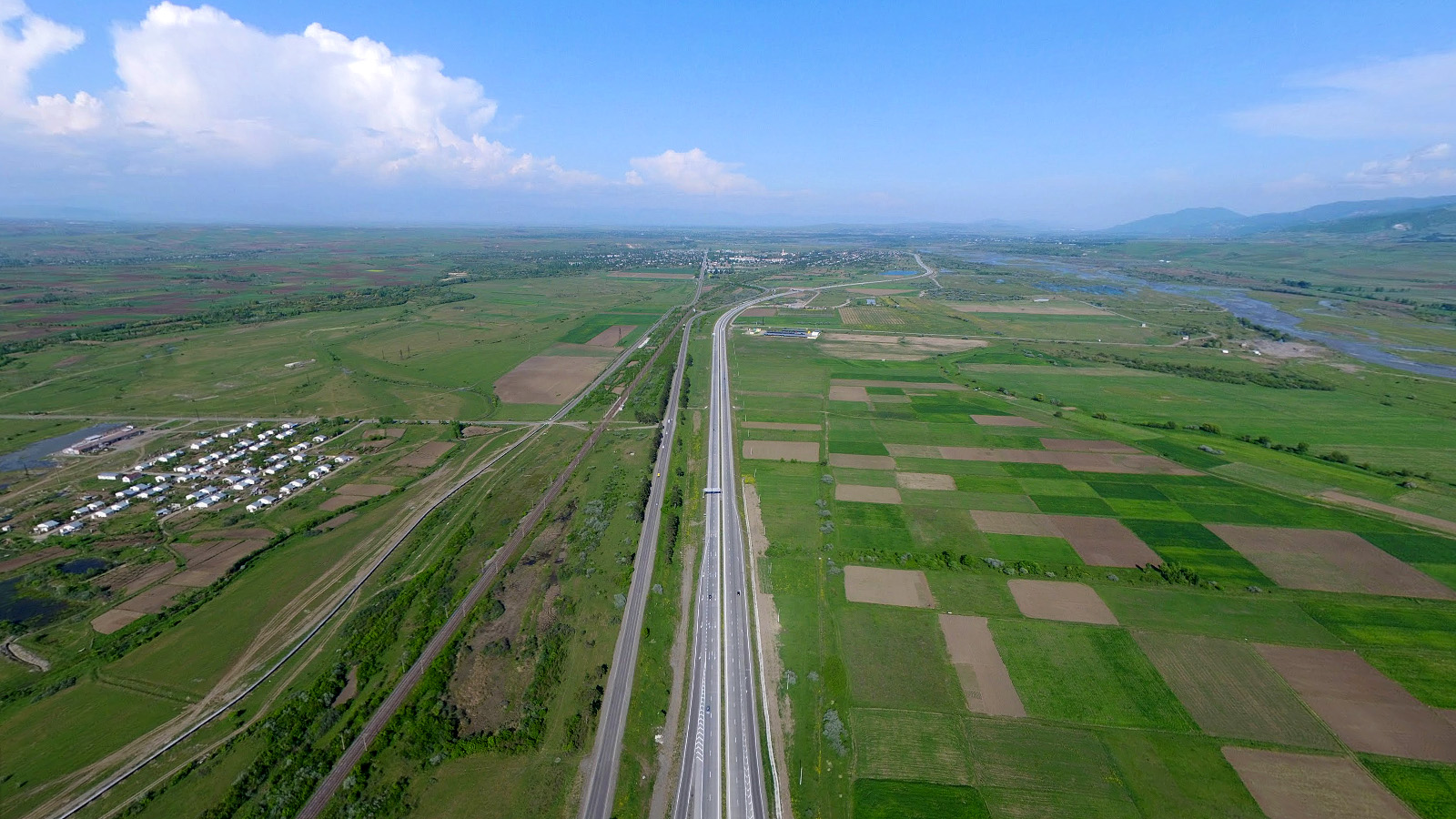
The Agara Bypass was completed in 2015, while the old S1 on the left side was renumbered Sh203

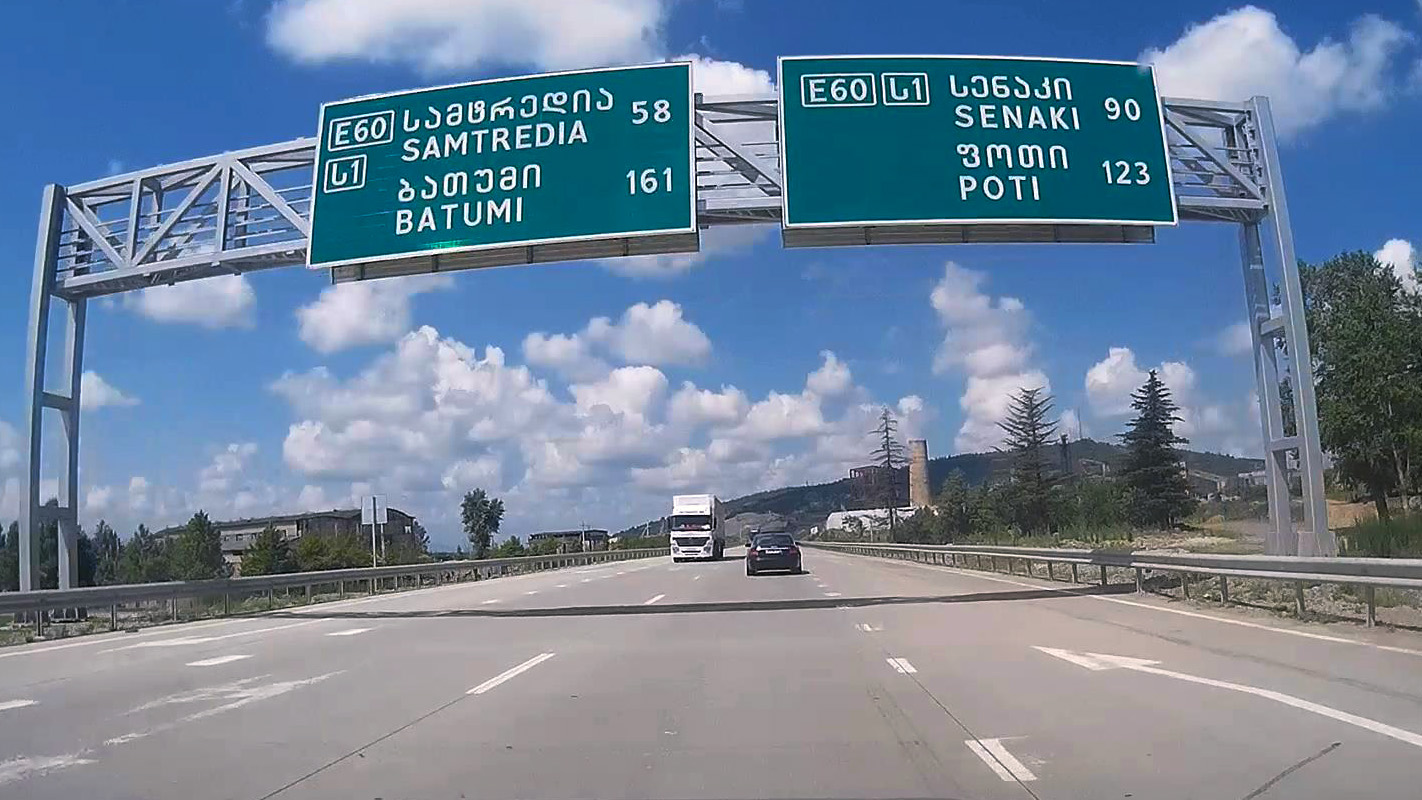
Initially the Kutaisi Bypass was completed as two lane grade separated highway

Since 2006 more than 160 kilometres (99 mi) of the S1 highway has been realigned and upgraded to expressway or motorway standards within the internationally sponsored East-West Highway project which was initiated in 2005. This ambitious long term project aims to create a 455 kilometres (283 mi) east-west transport corridor through Georgia and connecting Azerbaijan and Armenia with Turkey by upgrading Georgian sections of the E60 (Poti-Tbilisi-Red Bridge, Azerbaijan) and E70 (Poti-Batumi-Sarpi, Turkey) highways to strengthen Georgia's position as South Caucasus transport hub. The East-West Highway project includes redesign of major sections of the Georgian S1, S2, S4, S12 and more recently the S7 highway, to grade-separated highways, mostly as 2x2 expressway.

The majority of the East-West Highway has been planned as 2x2 expressway, in some cases the upgrades have been implemented as grade-separated two lane highway with median separation and hard shoulders (reminiscent of a super-two), such as the S2 Kobuleti and Batumi Bypasses. The S1 Kutaisi Bypass was initially constructed as a grade-separated wide two lane highway with hard shoulders, but was doubled to a 2x2 motorway a few years later. While most of the involved sections of the S1 have been completely redesigned and rerouted with bypasses of cities and towns, the 53 kilometres (33 mi) Natakhtari to Gori/Sveneti section follows the original route and has been doubled between 2006 and 2009 by constructing an additional parallel two-lane road (and rehabilitation of the old road before becoming operational as 2x2). The 15 kilometres (9.3 mi) northern bypass of Gori (Sveneti - Ruisi) was the first real test of the project during 2009-2011, with two new parallel 880 meter viaducts and two parallel tunnels of 800 meter in one project divided over three tenders. The short but fierce 2008 Russo-Georgian War had a temporary effect on the project, and construction quickly picked up in 2009.

Despite earlier political promises the East-West Highway would be finished by 2020, the construction of crucial sections is still ongoing (as of 2021) until at least 2024, with remaining sections of the S1 to be completed by 2023. The project is sponsored by both European and Asian development banks, the World Bank, European Union and others, giving credits amounting to more than $2 billion for the S1 upgrades alone (with additional state funding). Construction companies from various European and Asian countries have been involved, with mixed success. Some tenders ran into technical and legal issues, with some contracts having been terminated by the Georgian government due to excessive underperformance of the contracted party, resulting in multiple year delays on various lots.

For the S1 highway the (E60/E70) East-West Highway project is scoped to the 250 kilometres (160 mi) Tbilisi - Samtredia section. The project envisions to upgrade the S1 to (2x2) expressway/motorway standards until Samtredia, where the S12 will continue as (2x2) motorway in the direction of Batumi. As it stands, the S1 between Samtredia and Senaki will remain a two lane highway with no major redesigns scheduled as of 2021. The focus of the East-West Highway upgrades in the western part lies in the shorter route to Batumi via a completely redesigned S12. By 2021, over 160 kilometres (99 mi) of the S1 between Natakhtari and Samtredia has been upgraded to 2x2 motorway standards, with the remaining additional 58 kilometres (36 mi) being under construction.

Below a detailed overview of S1 sections that have been or are being upgraded to 2x2 expressway/motorway configuration within the East-West Highway project, in consecutive order from East (Tbilisi) to West.

Segment	Lot	Length	Funding	Contractor	Start Construction	Finished or opened	Remarks
Natakhtari - Aghaiani (Note: Construction of this section to four lanes was already envisioned in the 1980s under Soviet rule while some ground works were already started but were interrupted when Georgia became independent.)		16 km	State budget ($40 mln)	Caucasus Road Project (GE); ZIMO LLC (GE)	Mar 2006	Oct 2006	Eastbound lane opened in bidirectional mode
Natakhtari - Aghaiani		16 km	State budget ($40 mln)	Caucasus Road Project (GE); ZIMO LLC (GE)	Mar 2006	Dec 2007	Westbound lane opened in 2x2 mode.
Aghaiani - Igoeti		12 km	World Bank via IDA ($19 mln)	Caucasus Road Project (GE); ZIMO LLC (GE)	Jun 2007	Nov 2008	Igoeti bypass viaducts completed in 2011
Igoeti - Sveneti		25 km	World Bank via IDA ($55 mln)	Ashtrom Group Ltd (IL)	2008	Jun 2009	Eastbound lane opened in bidirectional mode
Igoeti - Sveneti		25 km	World Bank via IDA ($55 mln)	Ashtrom Group Ltd (IL)	2008	Nov 2009	Westbound lane opened in 2x2 mode
Sveneti - Ruisi	Lot-1 80-85km	5 km	World Bank via IBRD ($147 mln); State budget $37 mln	Akkord (AZ)	Jul 2009	Oct 2010	
Sveneti - Ruisi	Lot-2 85-86km	1 km	World Bank via IBRD ($147 mln); State budget $37 mln	Akkord (AZ)	Jul 2009	Nov 2011	Liakhvi River Viaduct (2x 877 m)
Sveneti - Ruisi	Lot-3 86-95km	9 km	World Bank via IBRD ($147 mln); State budget $37 mln	Todini Costruzioni (IT)	Jul 2009	Nov 2011	Including Gori Tunnels (2x 800 m)
Ruisi - Agara (Mokhisi)		19 km	World Bank via IDA ($43 mln)	China Nuclear Industry; 23 Construction Co (CN)	Aug 2012	Dec 2015	
Agara (Mokhisi) - Zemo Osiauri	Lot-1 Gomi Bypass	7 km	World Bank via IDA & IBRD ($55 mln)	Copri Construction (KW); Black Sea Group (GE)	Feb 2015	Jun 2016	
Agara (Mokhisi) - Zemo Osiauri	Lot-2 Agarebi - Zemo Osiauri	5 km	World Bank via IDA & IBRD ($55 mln)	Copri Construction (KW); Black Sea Group (GE)	Feb 2015	Nov 2017	Opened for traffic on 22 Aug 2020 together with connecting Khashuri Bypass (Lot-1)
Zemo Osiauri - Chumateteli (Rikoti Tunnel East portal)	Lot-1 Zemo Osiauri - Surami	8 km	EIB (€49.5 mln)	Sinohydro (CN)	Sept 2017	Aug 2020	Lot-1 was put in operation together with the above Lot-2 Agara - Zemo Osiauri (13 km in total). On 8 October 2020 the 2nd bridge across the Surami-Tsotskhnara road was opened.
Zemo Osiauri - Chumateteli (Rikoti Tunnel East portal)	Lot-2 Surami - Chumateteli	6 km	World Bank via IBRD ($140 mln)	Astaldi (IT, 2017); Sinohydro (2020)	Sept 2017		By 2019 the contract with Astaldi was terminated, which led to an arbitration case. Sinohydro won a renewed tender procedure in 2020. Construction resumed in 2021, to be completed by March 2023.
Rikoti Pass Tunnel renovation		2 km	World Bank via IBRD ($28 mln); State budget $7 mln	Sinohydro (CN)	Jul 2010	Nov 2011	Including renovation of 4km Tunnel Bypass road (Sh56)
Rikoti Pass road (Chumateleti-Argveta)	F1 Chumateleti-Khevi	12 km	World Bank via IBRD ($160 mln); EIB (€76 mln); State budget $44 mln	CSCEC (CN)	Oct 2019		Includes 22 bridges and 3 tunnels Second parallel Rikoti Tunnel (1800m)
Rikoti Pass road (Chumateleti-Argveta)	F2 Khevi-Ubisa	12 km	ADB ($300 mln); World Bank ($140 mln); State budget $130 mln	Hunan Road & Bridge; Construction Group (CN)	May 2019		Includes 35 bridges and 20 tunnels
Rikoti Pass road (Chumateleti-Argveta)	F3 Ubisa-Shorapani	13 km	EIB (€332 mln); State budget €20 mln	CRBC (CN)	May 2019		Includes 27 bridges and 18 tunnels
Rikoti Pass road (Chumateleti-Argveta)	F4 Shorapani-Argveta	15 km	ADB ($278 mln); State budget $89 mln	Guizhou Highway; Engineering Group (CN)	April 2021		Includes 14 bridges and 12 tunnels. Initially to be financed by Japanese JICA. Contractor was signed in Jan 2020, work began in spring 2021
Argveta - Samtredia	Lot-3 Argveta-Nakhshirghele (Argveta-Kutaisi Bypass)	15 km	JICA ($212 mln)	Takenaka (JP) and Todini Costruzioni (IT)	Jun 2013	Jun 2017	Argveta to Nakhshirghele (2x2 lanes)
Argveta - Samtredia	Lot-1 Nakhshirghele-Ukaneti (Kutaisi Bypass)	17 km	JICA ($212 mln)	Takenaka (JP) and Todini Costruzioni (IT)	Feb 2012	Nov 2014	Initially built as 2 lane road. Opening in 2014 together with 15 km of Lot-2 until exit at Bashi. In 2018 a combined project of lots 1 and 2 was initiated to double highway to 2x2.
Argveta - Samtredia	Lot-2 Ukaneti-Samtredia (Kutaisi bypass-Samtredia)	24 km	JICA ($212 mln)	Takenaka (JP) and Todini Costruzioni (IT)	Nov 2012	Jul 2016	Initially built as 2 lane highway, opening in 2016 of remaining 9 km Bashi - Samtredia.
Argveta - Samtredia	Lot-1 + Lot-2 second track Nakhshirghele-Samtredia	41 km	State budget $73 mln	Black Sea Group (GE, 3 lots); Akkord (AZ, 1 lot)	May 2019	Dec 2020	Doubled original lots 1 & 2 to 2x2 motorway with parallel road on south side.
1.000 km = 0.621 mi: Under construction; Construction suspended

== Route ==
The Georgian "Law on motor roads" stipulates that the reference point for the mileage of roads leaving Tbilisi is Freedom Square. This means Freedom Square is the reference point of the S1 mileage reflected in the tables below (and the kilometer posts along the road) while not necessarily its actual starting point, which is a bit harder to determine precisely. The speed limit on motorway sections is 110 km/h (70 mph) and 90 km/h (55 mph) on highway sections, with the exception of passage through towns and villages (60 km/h (35 mph), may vary locally) and within the Tbilisi city limits (60 to 80 km/h or 35 to 50 mph).

=== Tbilisi — Khashuri ===
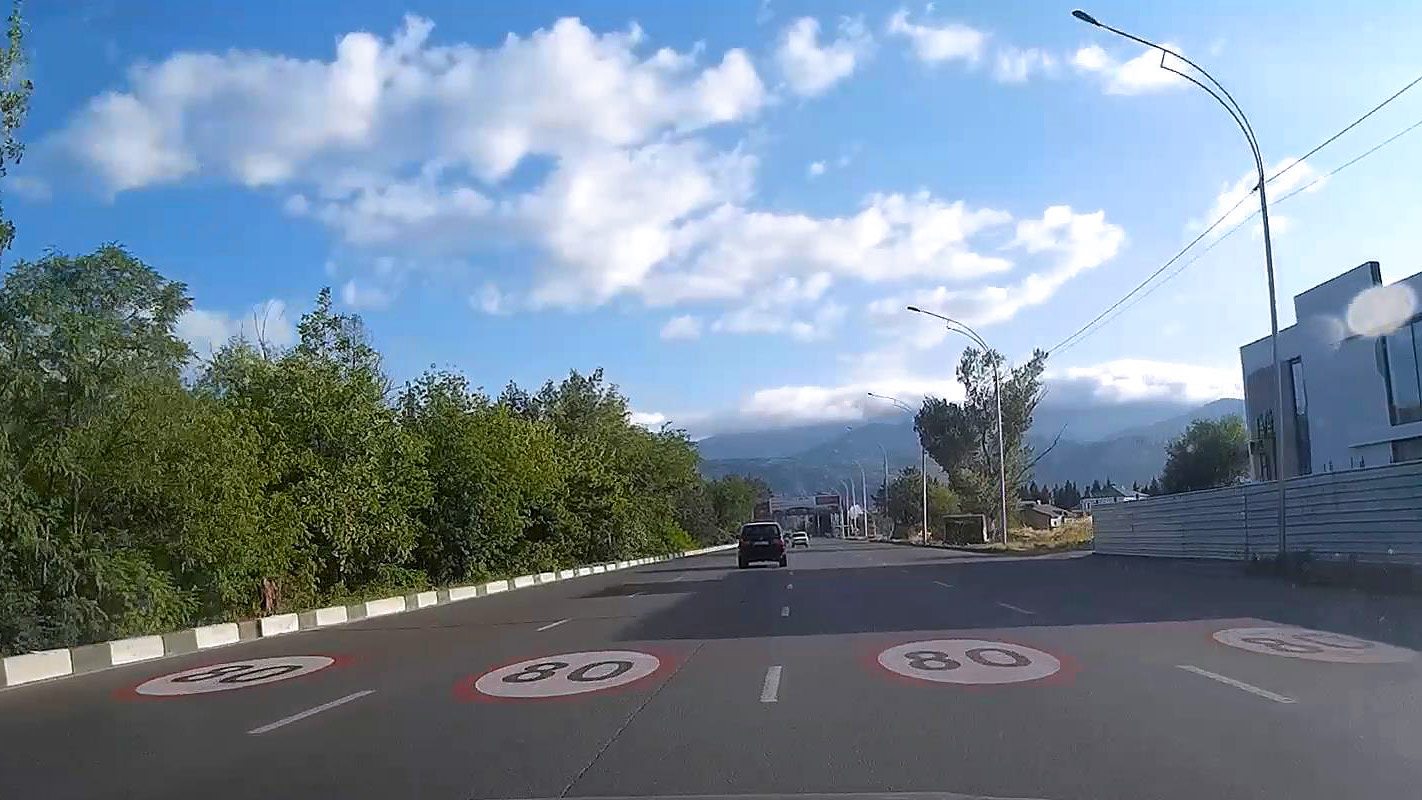
S1 highway through Tbilisi along Dighomi district

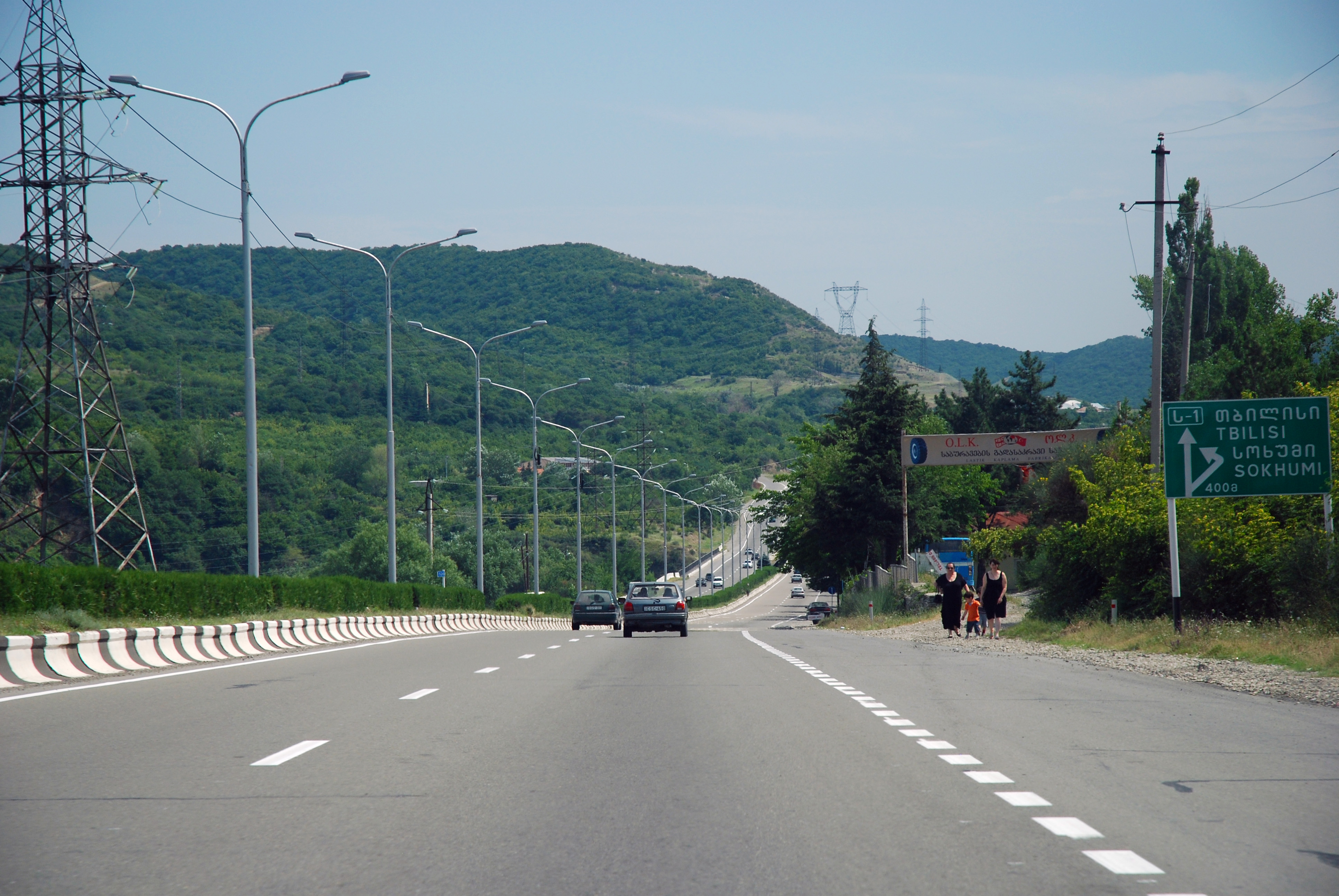
S1 Natakhtari - Mtskheta (old style S-1 indication)

Starting in Tbilisi the S1 runs north along the right bank of the Kura (Mtkvari) river in a 2x3 lane configuration with a speed limit of 60 km/h (37 mph). As central city thoroughfare this is a crowded section, with jamming on parts throughout the day. After passing the Saburtalo neighbourhood on the left hand side, the road diverts from the river bank with a wide median and 2x4 lanes. The speed limit is 80 km/h (50 mph) here. Along the Dighomi neighbourhood the median is used for U-turn points. After passing the Tbilisi Mall at the northern tip of the city and the tight left turn to Mtskheta, the road leaves the city of Tbilisi and becomes a 2x2 expressway/motorway.

The road crosses the Kura river and passes Mtskheta, the capital of the Georgian historic Kingdom of Iberia, and Jvari Monastery, the site of Georgia's 4th century Christian conversion. The highway follows the Aragvi River for a few kilometers and after the junction with the S3 highway to Kazbegi and Russia the road turns West. From this point westward the highway has been gradually upgraded to 2x2 since 2006 within the ambitious and prestigious East-West Highway project with a predominantly concrete road surface. At the rise at Igoeti two viaducts have been constructed in recent years to bypass the village, river and regional roads, after which the highway continues through an agricultural valley with a mountain ridge on the left hand side and the foothills of the South Ossetia/Tskhinvali breakaway region on the right. At Nadarbazevi village the highway runs only a few hundred meters away from the de facto administrative boundary line of the breakaway region.

Reaching the city of Gori the highway crosses the S10 highway which goes to Russia via South Ossetia through the Roki Tunnel. While Tskhinvali, the administrative capital of South Ossetia, is signposted it cannot be reached via the S10. After the Gori exit, the S1 highway crosses the Liakhvi river via an 880 m (0.55 mi) long viaduct, and then climbs to 770 m (2,530 ft) to the 800 m (0.50 mi) long Gori tunnel through a minor ridge on the West bank of the Liakhvi river. On either side of the twin-tube tunnel large highway service stations have opened in 2011, a premiere for Georgia at the time. After the tunnel the highway navigates down to meet the Kura river again, and follows it in a flat landscape until Khashuri. Various bypass sections have been constructed here in recent years. Near Khashuri the climb to the Likhi Range and the Rikoti Tunnel begins via a new bypass through the hills on the east side of Khashuri.

=== Khashuri — Samtredia ===
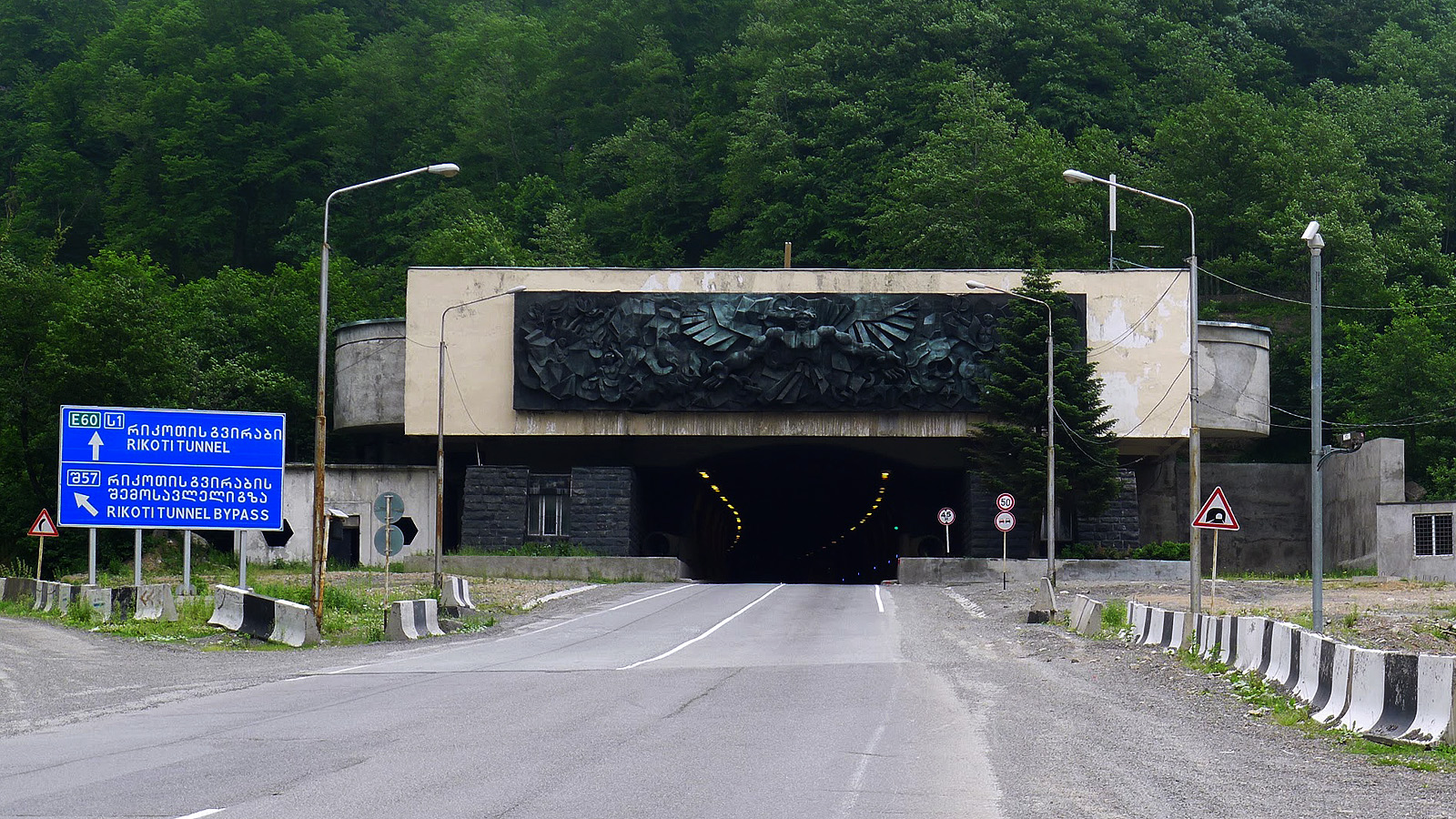
North entrance of Rikoti Tunnel, the longest vehicular tunnel within Georgia

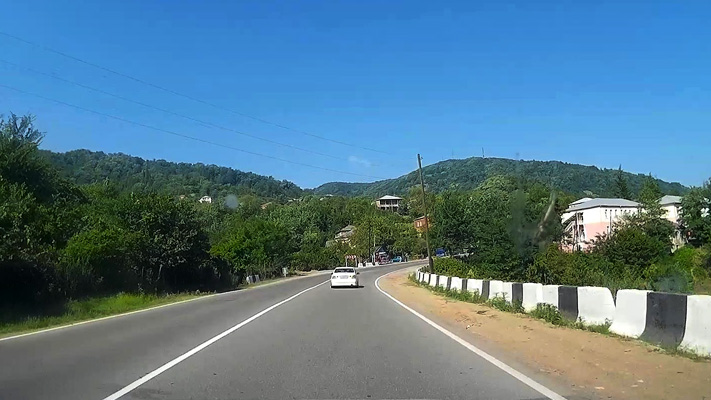
Typical part of S1 between Surami and Zestaponi through Likhi mountains

East of Khashuri town the highway quickly climbs into the Likhi Range to the Rikoti Tunnel via a new bypass. The bypass temporarily ends at Surami where the highway joins the old S1 two lane road until the construction of the 2nd section of the Khashuri Bypass will be finished. Construction has been suspended for a few years due to contractual issues but should resume by 2021 with a new constructor. The old S1 route through Khashuri and Surami is still important for through traffic to the S8 highway for touristic Borjomi and Turkey and Armenia. Shortly after Surami the S1 highway reaches its highest point of 910 m (2,990 ft) above sea level at the southern portal of the Rikoti Tunnel which cuts through the Rikoti Pass.

The pass itself is only slightly higher at 996 m (3,268 ft) and the old road across the pass serves as tunnel bypass road in case of incidents or maintenance. The Rikoti Tunnel was originally opened in 1982, extensively rehabilitated in 2010-11 and is the longest vehicular tunnel entirely in Georgia with a length of 1,722 m (1.070 mi). The 1984 Roki Tunnel at the end of the S10 highway is longer (3,730 m (2.32 mi)), but is shared with Russia while the Georgian section is not under control of Georgian authorities as it is located in breakaway South Ossetia region. In October 2020 construction of a parallel Rikoti Tunnel tube started, which will have a length of 1,800 m (1.1 mi).

From here the highway navigates downhill to Zestaponi following the Rikotula, Dzirula and Kvirila rivers. The Likhi Range separates East and West Georgia and is a geographic connection between the Greater Caucasus range in the north and the Lesser Caucasus range in the south. While the highest parts of the Likhi mountains exceed 2,000 m (6,600 ft) in altitude, the area around the S1 highway does not exceed the 1,000 m (3,300 ft) with the exception of the eastern flank near the Rikoti Pass which is slightly higher. The 50 km to Zestaponi is a curvy 2 lane highway route through lush and thickly forested river gorges with little opportunity to safely pass slower vehicles while running through villages and settlements. In the eastern (Tbilisi) direction, the road has a 4 km (2.5 mi) passing lane (2+1) for the uphill climb to the Rikoti Tunnel. Overall the practical speed is limited on this section. A completely new 52 km (32 mi) 2x2 expressway/motorway is under construction from the Rikoti Tunnel to Zestaponi/Argveta as part of the East-West Highway project with 96 tunnels and 53 bridges to be completed by 2024. This will reduce travel time significantly on this section.

West of Zestaponi, at Argveta, the S1 continues as a 2x2 motorway/expressway and enters the West-Georgian Colchis Plain by following the Kvirila river to Kutaisi, Georgia's 3rd largest city and home to the nation's second airport (David the Builder) which serves as tourist and low-cost carrier gateway. Near Kutaisi a completely new 41 km long bypass to Samtredia has been built. It first opened as two-lane highway in 2014, and by the end of 2020 as 2x2 motorway. At Samtredia the S1 highway connects with the S12 highway and runs through the town. From here the S1 continues to Senaki as two-lane highway. A new S12 2x2 motorway is under construction which will effectively be a continuation of the S1 motorway section. When completed, the S1 will continue via the Samtredia exit and pass over the current S12 with a viaduct.

=== Samtredia — Zugdidi / Enguri Bridge ===
At Samtredia the S1 leaves the 2x2 motorway, transfers through the town via a 1 km overlap with the S12 highway and continues to Senaki as two-lane highway. The road then passes through a string of towns and villages. A few kilometers West of Senaki the S2 highway branches of the S1 highway to the Black Sea port of Poti, which is also the destination of the E60 route. The S1 highway continues its route through the Colchis Plain with a string of villages and settlements and eventually reaches the city of Zugdidi. The highway runs as a straight line into the center of the city, to its Tavisupleba (Freedom) Square. From here the highway runs anti-clockwise around the local Botanical garden, and after crossing the Chkhousi River the road heads straight towards Abkhazia. About a kilometer before the Enguri Bridge, a Georgian police post is effectively the end for most (car) travellers on the S1, as travel into Abkhazia is restricted (by the Abkhazian side) and cars are not allowed to pass through the Abkhaz checkpoint.

=== Enguri Bridge — Leselidze ===
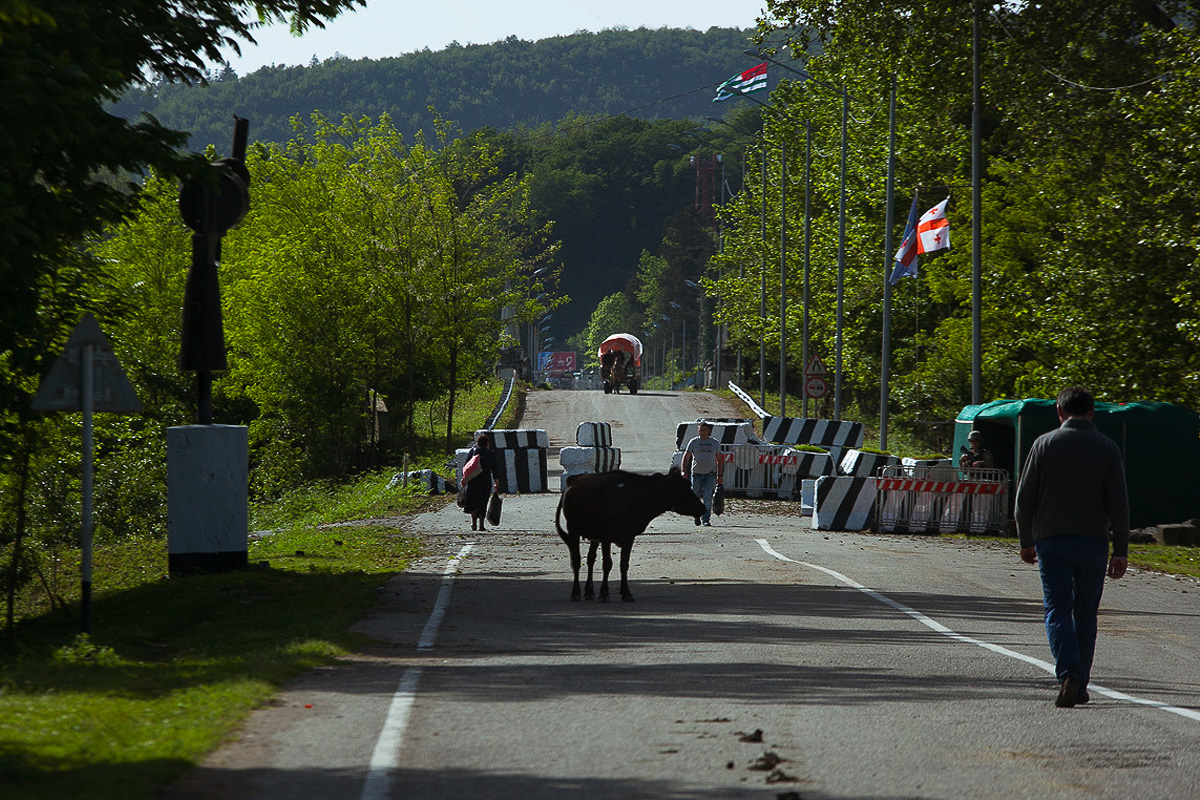
Roadblock at Enguri Bridge. Regular cars are not allowed to pass.

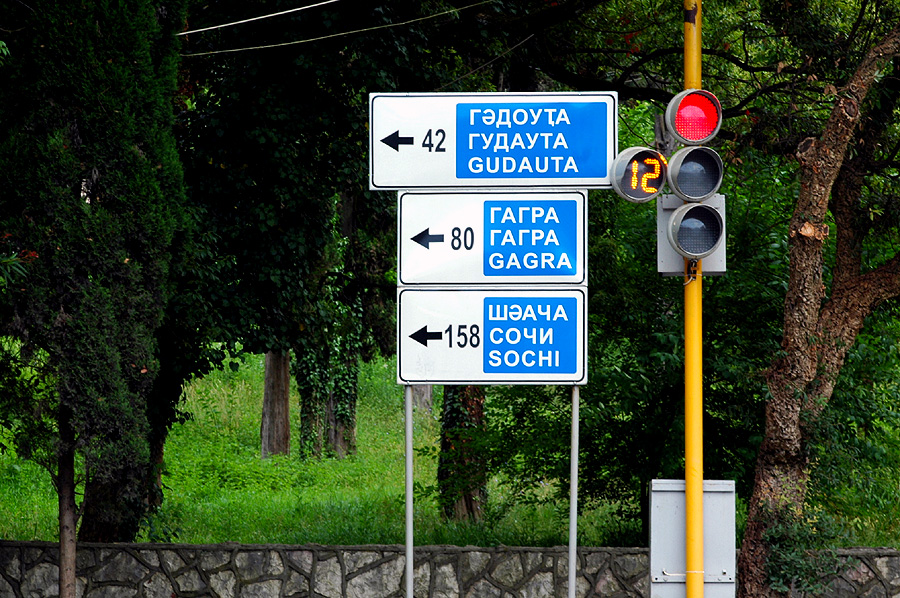
Road signs in Abkhazia are in Abkhazian, Russian and Latin script

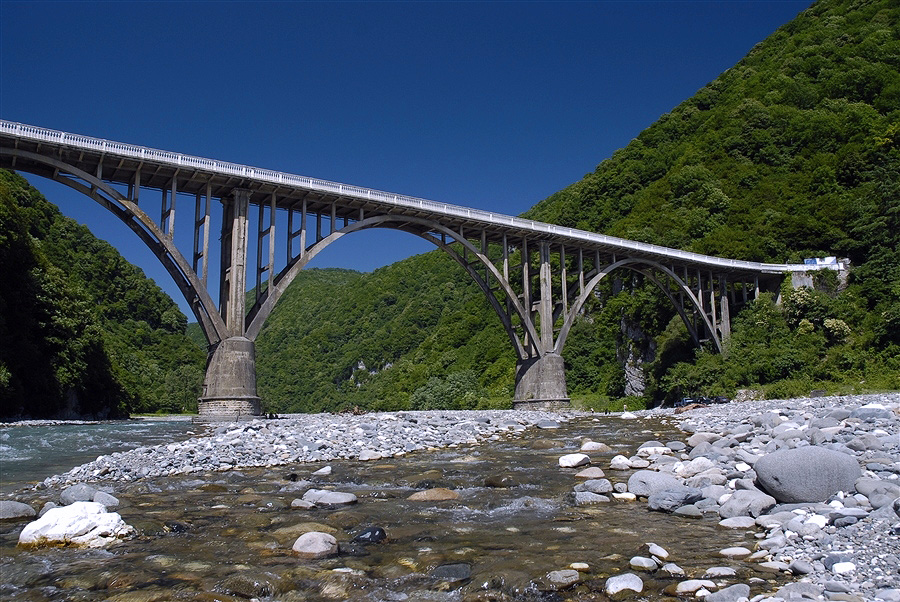
1932 landmark bridge across Gumista River, north of Abkhazia's capital Sokhumi

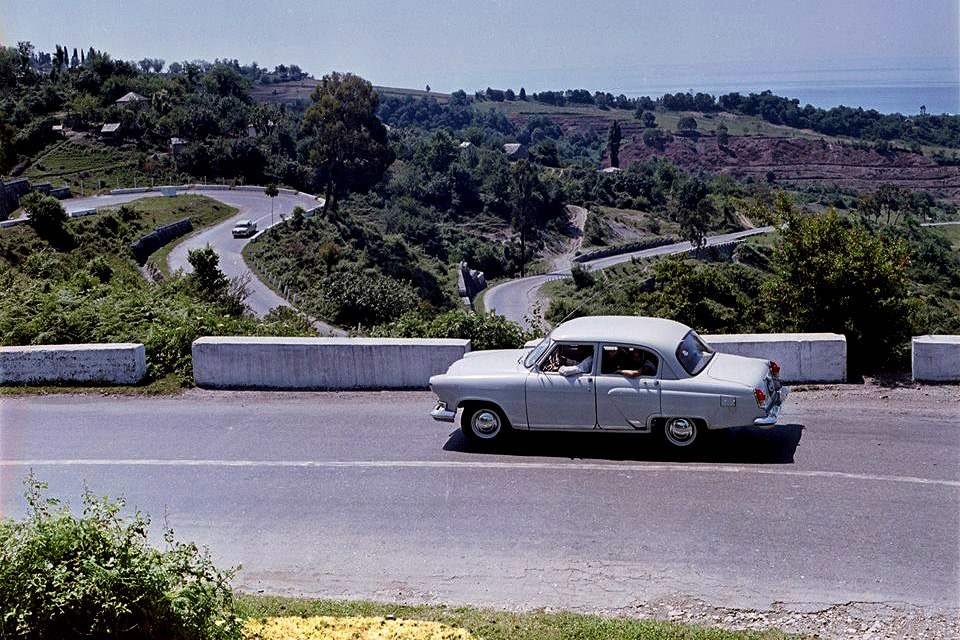
Series of hairpin bends above Narinjovani

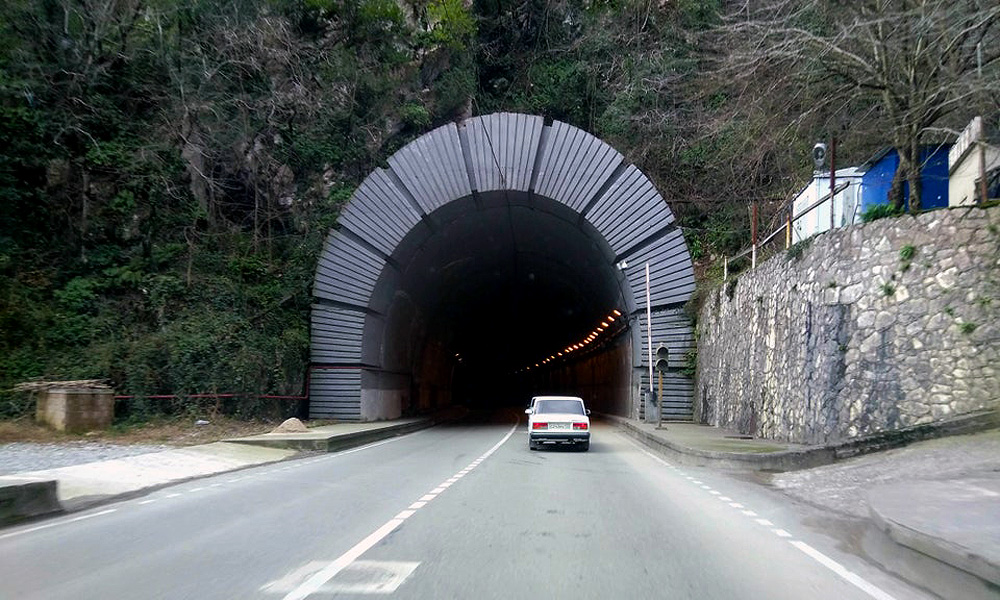
South entrance of Gagra Bypass Tunnels

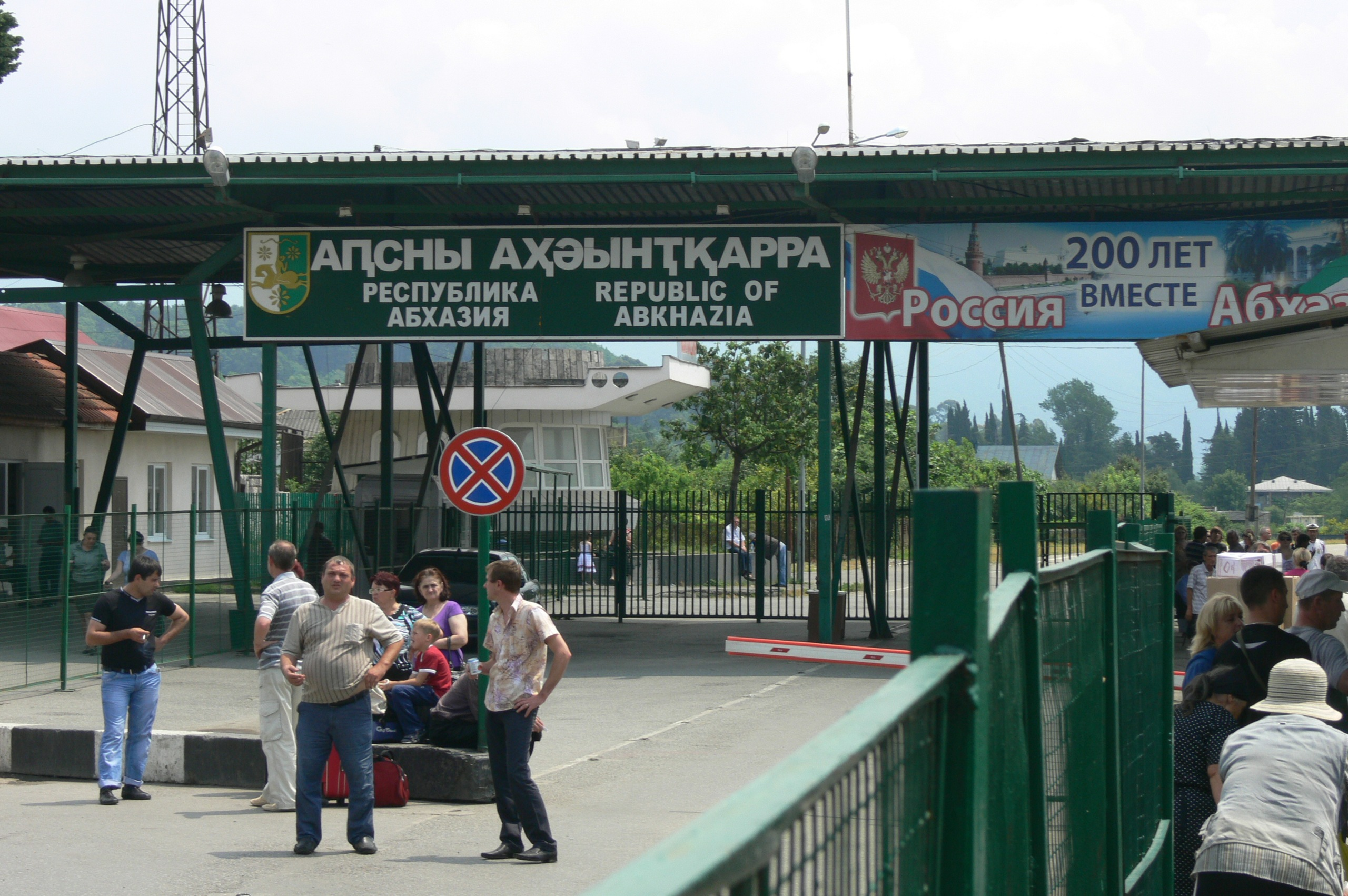
Abkhazian checkpoint

On the west side of the Enguri Bridge there is an Abkhaz checkpoint, after which the highway continues to Gali, the center of the Georgian community in Abkhazia. North from Gali the road crosses the discharge channel of the Enguri Dam Hydropower Cascade. From here the road continues in northwestern direction through the lush lowlands of southern Abkhazia, bypasses Ochamchire town and only near Sokhumi the foothills of the Caucasus Mountains push the road closer to the coast. At Tkhubuni village, 421 kilometres (262 mi) from Tbilisi and the southern terminus of the Sokhumi trolleybus, the Black Sea coast is finally reached. The highway then skirts the beaches and enters Sokhumi, the capital and main city of Abkhazia. The entire Abkhazian section of the S1 highway is a simple two lane road.

The route makes its way through the center of Sokhumi, passes the once famous Botanical Garden, Monkey Nursery and Railway station before making its way out to the north, towards the Gumista River. About five kilometers north of the city, the road crosses the Gumista River via a landmark bridge. The 170 meter long bridge with three arches rises high above the river and was built in 1932. It was the site of a fierce Abkhaz offensive towards Sokhumi against the Georgian army during the 1992-1993 civil war, taking the lives of at least 222 Abkhaz combatants. Plans to build a new bridge were unfolded in 2016, but in 2021 it appeared no compatible designs and other construction estimations were produced by the company that was paid in advance.

The highway continues west skirting the foothills of the Caucasus Mountains, and after reaching its highest point in the Abkhazian section descends back to the coast via a couple of hairpin bends. After passing the town of Gudauta, host of a Russian military base, the road turns inland circumventing the Bichvinta-Miuseri Strict Nature Reserve, Pitsunda Bay and the resort town the bay was named after. At Gagra the road goes through a tunneled bypass which was constructed in the 1980s to relieve the resort town growing transit traffic. The bypass consists of two tunnels of 1200 and 800 meters and was originally planned as 4 tunnels. The 3rd tunnel was under construction when the Soviet Union collapsed and construction was aborted. It was cut for 1300 meter from the south end and 300 meter from the north. A fourth tunnel was envisioned as well, but construction never started. The incomplete 3rd tunnel is now a favorite among urbexers. During the Abkhazian-Georgian civil war the bridge between the first and second tunnel was blown up, effectively disabling the bypass. In 2013 the (short) bridge was rebuilt, and both tunnels were rehabilitated and have been reopened for traffic since.

The Georgian S1 route reaches its end after 537 kilometres (334 mi) at the Psou River crossing which is the border with the Russian Federation at Leselidze (Gyachrypsh). Traffic passes through an Abkhazian controlled checkpoint before reaching the Russian border control and the Russian A147 highway across the river.

== Intersections ==
Region	Municipality	km	mi		Destinations	Route	Notes
City of Tbilisi		0	0.0			European route E117	South end E117 overlap
City of Tbilisi		12	7.5	Exit	Didi Digomi, Tbilisi		
City of Tbilisi		16	9.9	Exit	Zahesi		Transfer to S9 highway, no Eastbound entrance
City of Tbilisi		17	11	Exit	Jvari Monastery		Eastbound exit and entrance only
City of Tbilisi		18	11	Tbilisi city limits			
Mtskheta-Mtianeti	Mtskheta	18.5	11.5	Exit	Mukhatgverdi		Westbound exit and entrance only
Mtskheta-Mtianeti	Mtskheta	19	12	Exit	Mtskheta	Roads in Georgia (country)	
Mtskheta-Mtianeti	Mtskheta	19	12	Motorway			Motorway section (2x2)
Mtskheta-Mtianeti	Mtskheta	19.5	12.1	Crosses Kura River (360 m)			
Mtskheta-Mtianeti	Mtskheta	20	12	Interchange	Jvari Monastery (via შ 152) Tsiteli Khidi (Red Bridge) / Yerevan	S9 highway (Georgia) European route E60	"Tbilisi Bypass", through traffic to (Azerbaijan) and (Armenia) . East end E60/AH81, South end AH5 overlap
Mtskheta-Mtianeti	Mtskheta	23	14	Exit	Tsitsamuri		
Mtskheta-Mtianeti	Mtskheta	24	15	Exit	Saguramo		Zedazeni Monastery signposted
Mtskheta-Mtianeti	Mtskheta	25	16	Crosses Aragvi River (390 m)			
Mtskheta-Mtianeti	Mtskheta	26	16	Exit	Mtskheta	Roads in Georgia (country)	Eastbound exit and entrance only
Mtskheta-Mtianeti	Mtskheta	27	17	Interchange	Gudauri / Stepantsminda / Vladikavkaz	S3 highway (Georgia) European route E117	Highway to (Russia) border via Kazbegi / Darial Gorge. North end E117 / AH81 overlap
Mtskheta-Mtianeti	Mtskheta	29	18	Exit	Tserovani IDP Refugee Camp		Exits only
Mtskheta-Mtianeti	Mtskheta	32	20	Exit	Gorovani / Tserovani		Wineroute signposted
Mtskheta-Mtianeti	Mtskheta	39	24	Interchange	Akhalgori / Ksani	Roads in Georgia (country)	Ksani Fortress and wineroute signposted
Mtskheta-Mtianeti	Mtskheta	41	25	Crosses Ksani River (240 m, region boundary)			
Shida Kartli	Kaspi	42	26	Exit	Agaiani		
Shida Kartli	Kaspi	45	28	Exit	Tsikhisdziri		Eastbound exit and entrance only
Shida Kartli	Kaspi	47	29	Exit	Ferma		Westbound exit and entrance only
Shida Kartli	Kaspi	51	32	Exit	Okami		
Shida Kartli	Kaspi	55.4	34.4	Exit	Samtavisi	Roads in Georgia (country)	No eastbound exit
Shida Kartli	Kaspi	55.6	34.5	Igoeti Viaduct (220 m)			
Shida Kartli	Kaspi	56.3	35.0	Exit	Samtavisi		Westbound exit only
Shida Kartli	Kaspi	56.5	35.1	Crosses Lekhura River (420 m)			
Shida Kartli	Kaspi	57	35	Exit	Kaspi / Samtavisi / Lamiskana		Eastbound exit only
Shida Kartli	Kaspi	59	37	Exit	Gamdlistskaro / Zemo Rene		
Shida Kartli	Kaspi	64	40	Exit	Nigoza / Kodistskaro		
Shida Kartli	Gori	67	42	Exit	Khurvaleti / Nadarbazevi		
Shida Kartli	Gori	71	44	Exit	Shavshebi / Tsitelubani		
Shida Kartli	Gori	73	45	Exit	Shavshebi		Eastbound exit only
Shida Kartli	Gori	75	47	Exit	Akhalsopeli / Akhalsheni		
Shida Kartli	Gori	79	49	Exit	Sveneti		
Shida Kartli	Gori	80	50	Exit	Gori / Mejvrishevi / Uplistsikhe	Roads in Georgia (country)	Uplistsikhe cave ruins signposted
Shida Kartli	Gori	80	50	Crosses Tortla River			
Shida Kartli	Gori	81	50	Exit	Mejvrishevi		Eastbound exit and entrance
Shida Kartli	Gori	82	51	Crosses Mejuda River			
Shida Kartli	Gori	83	52	Exit	Gori / Tskhinvali	S10 highway (Georgia)	Highway to (Russia) border via Roki Tunnel. after Ergneti: access South Ossetia prohibited.
Shida Kartli	Gori	84	52	Crosses Liakhvi River (880 m)			
Shida Kartli	Gori	86	53	Wissol Service station – Westbound only. EV Charging, (Fast) Food, Supermarket			
Shida Kartli	Kareli	87	54	Gori Tunnel (780 m)			
Shida Kartli	Kareli	88	55	Exit	Otarsheni		Eastbound only, Gori Tunnel Bypass road
Shida Kartli	Kareli	90	56	SOCAR Service station – Eastbound only. EV Charging, (Fast) Food, Supermarket			
Shida Kartli	Kareli	94	58	Exit	Ruisi / Urbnisi		
Shida Kartli	Kareli	97	60	Exit	Ruisi / Bebnisi		
Shida Kartli	Kareli	101	63	Exit	Kareli / Sagolasheni	Roads in Georgia (country)	
Shida Kartli	Kareli	103	64	Crosses Prone River (280 m)			
Shida Kartli	Kareli	105	65	Exit	Kvenatkotsa / Agara		Westbound exit, eastbound entrance
Shida Kartli	Kareli	114	71	Exit	Gomi / Sachkhere		
Shida Kartli	Khashuri	120	75	Exit	Agarebi Khashuri / Borjomi		
Shida Kartli	Khashuri	120	75	Exit	Agarebi Khashuri / Borjomi		Transfer through Khashuri to ს8 highway to Borjomi and (Turkey)
Shida Kartli	Khashuri	132	82	Exit	Surami		All traffic exits to old ს1 2-lane highway.
Shida Kartli	Khashuri	132	82	End of Motorway			Motorway section (2x2)
Shida Kartli	Khashuri	133	83	Surami town limits			
Shida Kartli	Khashuri	133	83	Roundabout	Khashuri / Borjomi		Transfer via Khashuri for ს8 to Borjomi and (Turkey) . East end AH82 overlap.
Shida Kartli	Khashuri	136	85	Left junction	Phona	Roads in Georgia (country)	
Shida Kartli	Khashuri	137	85	Surami town limits			
Shida Kartli	Khashuri	139	86	Left junction	Rikoti Tunnel Bypass	Roads in Georgia (country)	Rikoti Tunnel Bypass Road
Shida Kartli	Khashuri	140	87	Rikoti Tunnel (1722 m, region boundary)			
Imereti	Kharagauli	144	89	Left junction	Rikoti Tunnel Bypass	Roads in Georgia (country)	Rikoti Tunnel Bypass Road
Imereti	Kharagauli	168	104	Left junction	Ubisa / Ghoresha		Ubisa Monastery
Imereti	Zestaponi	180	110	Left junction	Dzirula	Roads in Georgia (country)	
Imereti	Zestaponi	187	116	Passes through Shorapani			
Imereti	Zestaponi	189	117	Zestaponi town limits			
Imereti	Zestaponi	192	119	Right junction	Chiatura	Roads in Georgia (country)	
Imereti	Zestaponi	195	121	Left junction	Baghdati	Roads in Georgia (country)	
Imereti	Zestaponi	196	122	Zestaponi town limits			
Imereti	Zestaponi	199	124	Left junction	Argveta		At-grade junction: westbound exit, eastbound entrance
Imereti	Zestaponi	199	124	Motorway			Motorway section (2x2)
Imereti	Zestaponi	199	124	Exit	Argveta		Grade separated: eastbound exit, westbound entrance
Imereti	Zestaponi	200	120	Wissol Petroleum service station – Westbound only. EV Charging, (Fast) Food, Supermarket			
Imereti	Zestaponi	200	120	Exit	Rodinauli		Eastbound exit/entrance only
Imereti	201	125	Crosses the Kvirila River (100 m, municipality boundary)				
Imereti	Terjola	202	126	Exit	Terjola	Roads in Georgia (country)	
Imereti	Terjola	203	126	Exit	Khareba Winery		Westbound only for public access Khareba Winery
Imereti	Terjola	203	126	Rompetrol service station – Eastbound only. EV Charging, (Fast) Food, Supermarket			
Imereti	Terjola	204	127	Crosses Chkhari River (100 m)			
Imereti	Terjola	204	127	SOCAR service station – Eastbound only. EV Charging, (Fast) Food, Supermarket			
Imereti	Terjola	205	127	Exit	Siktarva		
Imereti	Terjola	206	128	Crosses Dzevrula River (160 m)			
Imereti	Terjola	206	128	Exit	Etseri		
Imereti	Terjola	209	130	Exit	Etseri		
Imereti	Terjola	210	130	Crosses Charchkhulisghele River (100 m)			
Imereti	Terjola	211	131	Exit	Kveda Simoneti		
Imereti	Terjola	215	134	Exit	Nakhshirghele		
Imereti	Terjola	217	135	Crosses Chishura River (630m)			
Imereti	Terjola	222	138	Crosses Tskaltsitela River (100 m, municipality boundary)			
Imereti	Baghdati	223	139	Rioni Hydropower Plant Canal			
Imereti	Baghdati	223	139	Exit	Baghdati / Kutaisi	Roads in Georgia (country)	
Imereti	Baghdati	224	139	Crosses Rioni River (850m, municipality boundary)			
Imereti	Tsqaltubo	227	141	Interchange	Geguti / Kutaisi		
Imereti	Tsqaltubo	231	144	Exit	Ukaneti / Mukhiani		
Imereti	Tsqaltubo	235	146	Exit	Opshkviti		
Imereti	Samtredia	246	153	Exit	Bashi / Akhalsopeli		
Imereti	Samtredia	252	157	Exit	Akhalsopeli		
Imereti	Samtredia	255	158	Crosses Ochopa River (330m)			
Imereti	Samtredia	257	160	Exit	Batumi Samtredia / Poti / Sokhumi	S12 highway (Georgia) European route E692	Highway to (Turkey) via Grigoleti, Batumi, Sarpi
Imereti	Samtredia	257	160	Exit	Batumi Samtredia / Poti / Sokhumi	S12 highway (Georgia)	All ს1 traffic transfers through Samtredia (via ს12). South end ს12 / E692 overlap
Imereti	Samtredia	257	160	End of Motorway			Motorway section (2x2)
Imereti	Samtredia	258	160	Roundabout	Samtredia Poti / Sokhumi		
Imereti	Samtredia	258	160	Roundabout	Samtredia Poti / Sokhumi	S12 highway (Georgia) European route E692	North end ს12 / E692 overlap
Imereti	Samtredia	258	160	Crosses Samtredia—Batumi railway line			
261	Samtredia	162	Crosses Tskhenistskali River (120m, boundary Samegrelo-Zemo Svaneti region				
Samegrelo-Zemo Svaneti	Abasha	271	168	Right junction	Martvili	Roads in Georgia (country)	
Samegrelo-Zemo Svaneti	Abasha	272	169	Left junction	Sujuna	Roads in Georgia (country)	
Samegrelo-Zemo Svaneti	Abasha	275	171	Crosses Abasha River (100m)			
Samegrelo-Zemo Svaneti	Senaki	282	175	Crosses Tekhuri River (180m)			
Samegrelo-Zemo Svaneti	Senaki	282	175	Senaki town limits			
Samegrelo-Zemo Svaneti	Senaki	282	175	Exit	Nokalakevi	Roads in Georgia (country)	
Samegrelo-Zemo Svaneti	Senaki	286	178	Right junction	Chkhorotsku	Roads in Georgia (country)	
Samegrelo-Zemo Svaneti	Senaki	287	178	Senaki town limits			
Samegrelo-Zemo Svaneti	Senaki	288	179	Crosses Tsivi River (120m)			
Samegrelo-Zemo Svaneti	Senaki	291	181	Left junction	Poti / Batumi	S2 highway (Georgia) European route E60 European route E97	Highway to (Turkey) via Sarpi. West end E60 / AH5 overlap; East end E97 overlap
Samegrelo-Zemo Svaneti	Senaki	291	181	Crossing Senaki—Poti railway line			
Samegrelo-Zemo Svaneti	Khobi	300	190	Right junction	Zeni	Roads in Georgia (country)	
Samegrelo-Zemo Svaneti	Khobi	301	187	Crossing	Khobi station / Akhalsopeli	Roads in Georgia (country)	
Samegrelo-Zemo Svaneti	Khobi	301	187	Crosses Khobistskhali (Khobi) River (150m)			
Samegrelo-Zemo Svaneti	Khobi	301	187	Khobi town limits			
Samegrelo-Zemo Svaneti	Khobi	302	188	Left junction	Poti / Chaladidi	Roads in Georgia (country)	
Samegrelo-Zemo Svaneti	Khobi	304	189	Khobi town limits			
Samegrelo-Zemo Svaneti	Khobi	306	190	Crosses Munchia River			
Samegrelo-Zemo Svaneti	Zugdidi	317	197	Crosses Jumi River (100 m)			
Samegrelo-Zemo Svaneti	Zugdidi	326	203	Zugdidi city limits			
Samegrelo-Zemo Svaneti	Zugdidi	326	203	Crossing	Anaklia / Sokhumi	Roads in Georgia (country)	
Samegrelo-Zemo Svaneti	Zugdidi	330	210	Right junction		Roads in Georgia (country)	
Samegrelo-Zemo Svaneti	Zugdidi	330	210	Roundabout	Tsalenjikha	Roads in Georgia (country)	
Samegrelo-Zemo Svaneti	Zugdidi	331	206	Crosses Chkhousi River (110 m)			
Samegrelo-Zemo Svaneti	Zugdidi	332	206	Right junction	Mestia	Roads in Georgia (country)	
Samegrelo-Zemo Svaneti	Zugdidi	333	207	Zugdidi city limits			
Samegrelo-Zemo Svaneti	Zugdidi	337	209	Crosses Rukhi River			
Samegrelo-Zemo Svaneti	Zugdidi	338	210	Georgian police checkpoint to Enguri Bridge and Abkhazia.			
Samegrelo-Zemo Svaneti	Zugdidi	340	210	Crosses Enguri River (600 m)			
Abkhazia AR	Gali	340	210	Abkhaz police checkpoint. Closed for car passage.			
Abkhazia AR	Gali	343	213	Left junction	Tagiloni		
Abkhazia AR	Gali	349	217	Gali town (5 km)			
Abkhazia AR	Gali	354	220	Crosses Gali Reservoir Canal of the Enguri hydroelectric power station			
Abkhazia AR	Gali	364	226	Crosses Okumi River (150 m)			
Abkhazia AR	Ochamchire	371	231	Left junction	Ochamchire		
Abkhazia AR	Ochamchire	375	233	Crosses Ghalidzga River (150 m)			
Abkhazia AR	Ochamchire	376	234	Crossing	Ochamchire / Tkvarcheli	Roads in Georgia (country)	
Abkhazia AR	Ochamchire	381	237	Crosses Mokvi River (150 m)			
Abkhazia AR	Ochamchire	382	237	Right junction	Mokvi		
Abkhazia AR	Ochamchire	407	253	Crosses Kodori River (170 m), municipality boundary			
Abkhazia AR	Gulripshi	414	257	Left junction	Babushara / Sokhumi Airport		
Abkhazia AR	Gulripshi	417	259	Gulripshi town (2 km)			
Abkhazia AR	Gulripshi	420	260	Crosses Machara River			
Abkhazia AR	Gulripshi	420	260	Right junction	Merkheuli	Roads in Georgia (country)	
Abkhazia AR	Gulripshi	421	262	Tkhubuni (beach)			
Abkhazia AR	Gulripshi	423	263	Crosses Kelasuri River (140 m, municipality boundary)			
Abkhazia AR	Sokhumi	426	265	Sokhumi city limits			
Abkhazia AR	Sokhumi	429	267	Crossing	Eshera		
Abkhazia AR	Sokhumi	436	271	Left junction			
Abkhazia AR	Sokhumi	437	272	Sokhumi city limits			
Abkhazia AR	Sokhumi	438	272	Crosses Gumista River (170 m)			
Abkhazia AR	Gudauta	452	281	New Athos town limits			
Abkhazia AR	Gudauta	455	283	Right junction	New Athos Monastery / Anacopia Fortress		Access road to major cultural heritage sites
Abkhazia AR	Gudauta	456	283	New Athos town limits			
Abkhazia AR	Gudauta	466	290	Crosses Aapsta River (140 m, municipality boundary)			
Abkhazia AR	Gudauta	470	290	Gudauta town limits			
Abkhazia AR	Gudauta	472	293	Right junction	Lykhny		
Abkhazia AR	Gudauta	474	295	Gudauta town limits			
Abkhazia AR	Gudauta	478	297	Crosses Khipsta River (120 m)			
Abkhazia AR	Gudauta	479	298	Left junction	Miusera	Roads in Georgia (country)	
Abkhazia AR	Gudauta	493	306	Abkhazia police checkpoint			
Abkhazia AR	Gudauta	498	309	Crosses Bzipi River (390 m, municipality boundary)			
Abkhazia AR	Gagra	499	310	Right junction	Lake Ritsa	Roads in Georgia (country)	
Abkhazia AR	Gagra	504	313	Left junction	Pitsunda	Roads in Georgia (country)	
Abkhazia AR	Gagra	508	316	Left junction	Gagra		
Abkhazia AR	Gagra	514	319	Gagra bypass tunnel (800 m + 1300 m)			
Abkhazia AR	Gagra	516	321	Left junction	Gagra		
Abkhazia AR	Gagra	529	329	Gantiadi town limits			
Abkhazia AR	Gagra	532	331	Crosses Khashupse River (160 m)			
Abkhazia AR	Gagra	532	331	Left junction	Kheivani		
Abkhazia AR	Gagra	534	332	Gantiadi town limits			
Abkhazia AR	Gagra	536	333	Leselidze town limits			
Abkhazia AR	Gagra	537	334	Crossing	Leselidze Salme		
Abkhazia AR	Gagra	537	334	Abkhazia police checkpoint			
Abkhazia AR	Gagra	537	334	(Russia) Russian border checkpoint. Road continues as to Sochi and Novorossiysk			
Concurrency terminus; Incomplete access
