= Ramaz Nikolaishvili =

Georgian politician (born 1965)

Member of the Parliament of Georgia
- In office 21 October 2012 – 5 February 2025

Minister of Regional Development and Infrastructure
- In office 30 June 2010 – 31 August 2012
- Prime Minister: Nika Gilauri; Vano Merabishvili
- Preceded by: David Tkeshelashvili
- Succeeded by: Davit Narmania

Governor of Guria
- In office 4 February 2008 – 2008
- President: Mikheil Saakashvili
- Preceded by: Mikheil Svimonishvili
- Succeeded by: Valerian Chitaishvili

Personal details
- Born: June 17, 1965 (age 61) Tbilisi (Georgian SSR)
- Party: United National Movement
- Education: Polytechnic University of Georgia; Tbilisi State University

Ramaz Nikolaishvili (Georgian: რამაზ ნიკოლაიშვილი; born June 17, 1965) is a Georgian politician who has served as Governor of Guria and Deputy Minister of Defense in 2008, Chairman of the Roads Department from 2008–2010, Minister of Infrastructure and Regional Development from 2010–2012, and Member of Parliament from 2012–2025.

Starting his career in domestic intelligence through his work for the Financial Police where he led investigations into currency counterfeiting, he was appointed to serve a brief term in 2008 as Governor of Guria, before becoming Deputy Minister of Defense during the 2008 Russo-Georgian War. Becoming Minister of Regional Development and Infrastructure in 2010, he became one of the most popular members of the Saakashvili administration, leading the government's massive infrastructure jobs program meant to address Georgia's response to the Great Recession. In office, he was responsible for the completion of several high-level projects, including the Rikoti Pass and the East-West Highway, while securing international funds to build the Baku-Tbilisi-Kars railway.

A member of the United National Movement, he has been in Parliament since the 2012 parliamentary election that saw the victory of Georgian Dream, while briefly serving as an independent from 2017–2020. In Parliament, his term has mostly been focused on foreign policy.

== Biography ==
=== Family and education ===
Ramaz Nikolaishvili was born on June 17, 1965, in Tbilisi, the capital of then-Soviet Georgia. Starting his studies in 1983, he received a degree in civil engineering in 1990 from the Lenin Polytechnic University of Tbilisi, a Master's in Finance in 1997 from Tbilisi State University, and a degree in law in 2003 from the same institution.

He speaks Georgian, English, and Russian fluently. He has a wife and three children.

=== Early career ===
Ramaz Nikolaishvili first entered the private sector in 1990 as an engineer for the public energy contractor Tbilkalaki until 1993 and the Krebi association until 1994, before joining the public field through the Tax Inspection's Operative Division. In 2000, he would become Deputy Head of the Special Task Division of the same department.

From 2003 to 2004, he served as Deputy Chief of the Information and Analysis Department of the Financial Police, the main domestic intelligence agency aimed at investigating white collar crimes, and eventually became head of the police's Statistics and Information Services, a powerful position in the administration of President Mikheil Saakashvili as the latter had waged a large-scale attack against corruption. From 2005 to 2007, Ramaz Nikolaishvili headed the Tbilisi division of the Financial Police's investigative department, before being promoted as head of the Revenue Service's investigative department following the abolition of the Financial Police. As such, he was notably in charge of investigating cases of currency counterfeit.

In 2005, Nikolaishvili received the rank of Colonel. On September 17, 2007, he was awarded the Medal of Honor by President Saakashvili.

=== Governor of Guria ===
Shortly after his second inauguration, President Saakashvili appointed Ramaz Nikolaishvili as Governor of the Black Sea region of Guria as part of his gubernatorial reshuffle, replacing Mikheil Svimonishvili. His term coincided with the May 2008 parliamentary elections, during which he campaigned for the United National Movement in Guria. Following the UNM's victory, he was replaced in Guria and appointed as Deputy Minister of Defense. As such, Nikolaishvili led an MOD mission to the South Ossetian conflict zone on July 29, 2008, to plant a flag on the Sarabuki Hill, considered a strategic height for Georgia as shootouts were increasing between Georgian and South Ossetian forces. Nikolaishvili served during the August Russo-Georgian war and was awarded the Order of Honor by President Saakashvili on December 4, 2008.

=== Infrastructure Minister ===
After his work at the Ministry of Defense, Ramaz Nikolaishvili was appointed in late 2008 as chairman of the Roads Department, a government agency in charge of overseeing road construction across Georgia. As such, he oversaw a 521 million GEL budget to build new roads in 2009 as part of the stimulus package set out by President Saakashvili in response to the economic fallout from the Great Recession and the Russo-Georgian war. Among these projects were the Rikoti Tunnel, linking the regions of Imereti and Shida Kartli through the Likhi range, and the so-called "New Road", a highway in downtown Tbilisi meant to alleviate traffic. He would receive the "Engineer of the Year" award by the Scientific and Engineering Association of Georgia. On June 30, 2010, Ramaz Nikolaishvili was appointed as Minister of Regional Development and Infrastructure (MRDI) in the cabinet of Nika Gilauri, a signal that the Georgian government was setting infrastructure development as a priority, while Parliament approved a massive budget of 1.3 billion GEL, making the MRDI one of the best-funded government agencies.

Nikolaishvili sought a series of foreign investments to boost Georgia's domestic development budget, often traveling abroad and securing Dutch participation in the Georgian water system, Swiss funding for railway rehabilitation, Chinese investments in the country's highway network. In 2011, he signed a memorandum of cooperation with EU Commissioner Johannes Hahn to launch European funding programs in regional development, while successfully negotiating 190 million EUR and 43 million USD in loans and grants from the European Investment Bank and International Development Association respectively to fund the East-West Highway, a major trade road linking Tbilisi to the Western part of the country. Ramaz Nikolaishvili secured funding from the UNDP, the Swedish International Development Cooperation Agency, the European Bank for Reconstruction and Development, the Asian Development Bank, and the World Bank.

On May 19, 2011, Nikolaishvili successfully negotiated a deal with the Azerbaijani government, with Baku agreeing to allocate an additional 575 million USD to build the Georgian section of the Baku–Tbilisi–Kars railway, with the goal of finalizing the railway in 2012. One month later, the Marabda-Kartsakhi section of the railway was finalized. With Turkey, he negotiated an increase in the Baku-Tbilisi-Ceyhan pipeline's capacity from 1.2 million to 1.6 million barrels a day.

He notably introduced a "10-point plan" destined to modernize Georgia's infrastructure, an employment program meant to create 60,000 construction jobs between 2011 and 2015. As part of that project, the Ruisi-Sveneti Highway was opened in 2012, connecting Gori to the Rikoti Tunnel. By the end of his term, construction for bypasses around Kutaisi and Kobuleti had started, as did work for the Tbilisi-Rustavi Highway. He was also in charge of overseeing construction for a new parliament seat in Kutaisi. One of the most popular ministers in the Saakashvili administration, a 2011 poll by the International Republican Institute named road infrastructure as "the most important reform" in Georgia. In February 2011, the downsizing of the Ministry of Environmental Protection saw his own ministry grow significantly in size. Ramaz Nikolaishvili was named as a potential Prime Minister in 2012 to replace Nika Gilauri. As Minister, he was also tasked with overseeing the military conscription system as head of the Conscription Commission.

Ahead of the 2010 local elections, the NGO Georgian Young Lawyers' Association accused Ramaz Nikolaishvili of violating electoral law for attending a UNM campaign event in Guria and sought to have him fined by the Central Election Commission. An audit made by his successor Davit Narmania unveiled several violations in competitive bidding over street lighting contracts, while the ministry launched an investigation in 2014 over allegations that his administration had pressured private developers to launder money, although the case closed with any subpoena.

Ramaz Nikolaishvili resigned on August 31, 2012 to run as the UNM's nominee for the Parliament Majoritarian District of Ozurgeti.

=== In Parliament ===
In the 2012 parliamentary election, Ramaz Nikolaishvili ran in the Ozurgeti parliamentary district, facing six other candidates, including Zviad Kvachantiradze, a former diplomat that had been nominated by the opposition Georgian Dream coalition. Though he would lose the race, he still won a seat in Parliament after being placed as 20th on the United National Movement's proportional electoral list. He would be reelected through the party's list in 2016 and 2020. He's been a member of Parliament's Ethics Council since 2019.

As an MP, he focused largely on foreign relations, being a member of the Interparliamentary Assembly on Orthodoxy in 2012-2016, of the Parliamentary Assembly of the Black Sea Economic Cooperation (PABSEC) since 2016, of the Inter-Parliamentary Union since 2021, and of the Foreign Relations Committee since 2016. Elected Deputy Chairman of PABSEC, he was part of the monitoring groups in several presidential and parliamentary elections, including the 2018 Turkish presidential and primary elections, the 2019 European Parliament election in Bulgaria, the 2019 Kazakh presidential election, and the 2021 Moldovan parliamentary election. He visited the United States in 2019 and 2020 to meet with counterparts in the U.S. Senate and House of Representatives.

When a split in the UNM led to the creation of the European Georgia party in 2017, Nikolaishvili chose to remain neutral and became an independent lawmaker, affiliated to no faction. It's as an independent that he joined the UNM-led Strength Is in Unity faction during the 2020 parliamentary election. In the 2012-2016 parliamentary convocation, he was notably one of the most absent lawmakers, often missing key votes in protest of the Georgian Dream leadership. As such, he missed votes on adopting a key anti-discrimination bill in 2014 and on ratifying the Association Agreement between Georgia and the European Union. Nikolaishvili remained in boycott through most of 2020 and refused to attend a session to confirm the extension of the state of emergency over the COVID-19 pandemic in April. After allegations of massive voter fraud surfaced during the 2020 parliamentary election, Nikolaishvili was one of 49 elected MPs to not recognize the results and refused to take his seat for months, until a short-lived EU-facilitated agreement between Georgian Dream and the opposition ended the deadlock in April 2021.

== Awards ==
Awards
Ribbon	Award	Awarded by
	Medal of Honor (September 17, 2007)	President Mikheil Saakashvili
	Order of Honor (December 4, 2009)	President Mikheil Saakashvili
	Order of Excellence (May 24, 2010)	President Mikheil Saakashvili
	Certificate of Recognition (January 1, 2012)	Ilia II, Catholicos-Patriarch of All Georgia
	Order of Victory of Saint George (2012)	President Mikheil Saakashvili
	Order of Vakhtang Gorgasali, I Rank	President Giorgi Margvelashvili
	Order of Honor (June 19, 2019)	Parliamentary Assembly of the Black Sea Economic Cooperation
