= Speed limits in Georgia =

Speed limits in Georgia may refer to:

- Speed limits in Georgia (country)
- Speed limits in Georgia (U.S. state)
