= Surami Pass =

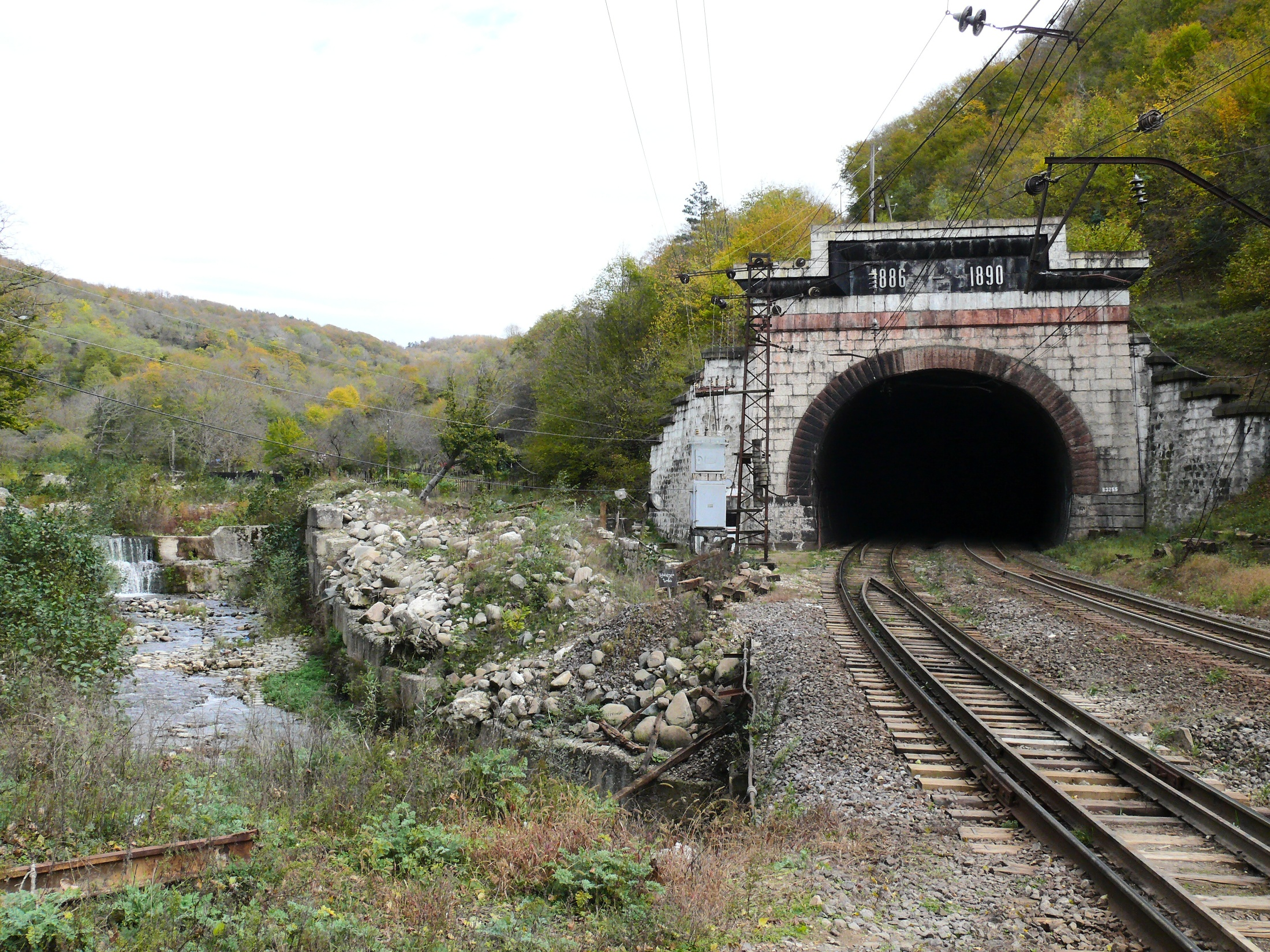
- Surami pass railway tunnel at Chkherimela river.

- Location within Caucasus Mountains Location within Georgia
- Interactive map of Surami Pass
- Elevation: 948 metres (3,110 ft)

Third Approach
- Range: Likhi Range
- Coordinates: 42°01′37″N 43°30′01″E

The Surami Pass (Georgian: სურამის უღელტეხილი) is a mountain pass in the Likhi Range of Georgia with an altitude of 949 metres (3,114 ft).

The pass connects the western and eastern part of Georgia. A railroad (in a tunnel) runs through the pass, as well as the Zestaponi–Khashuri highway.

== History ==
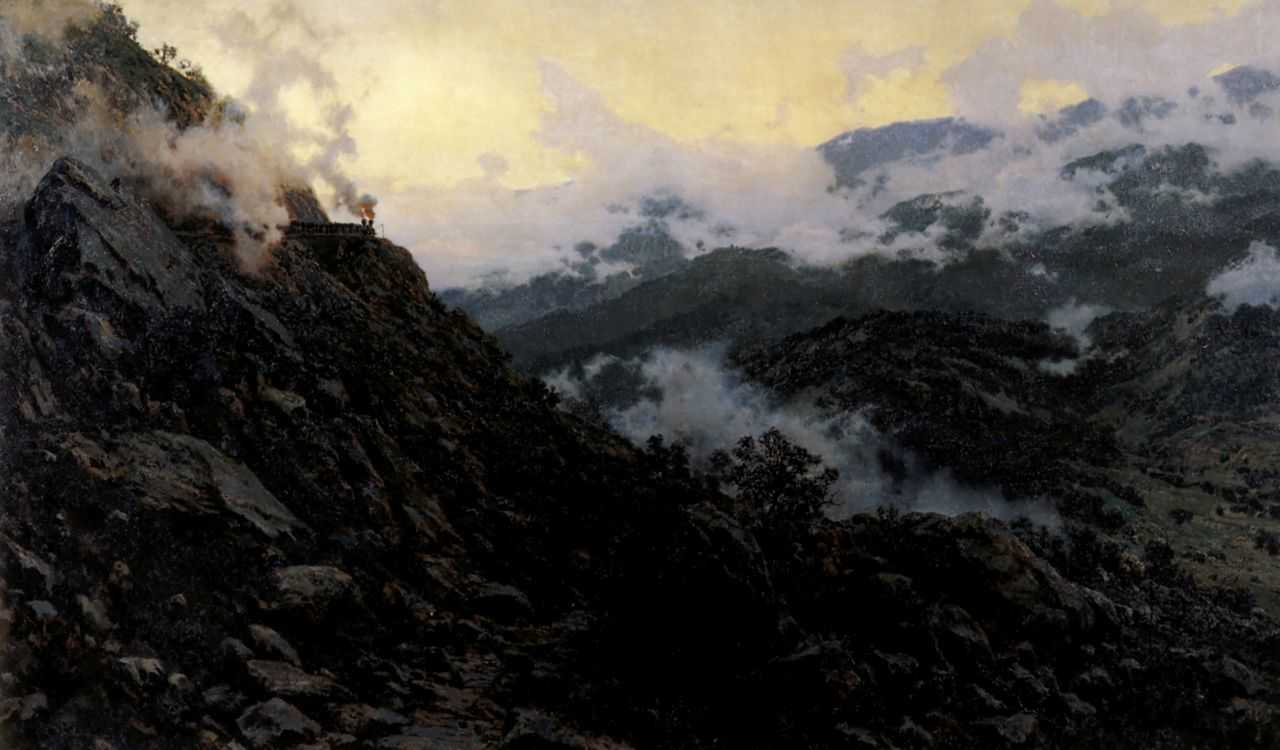
The Old Surami Pass by A. Kiselyov, 1891 A locomotive can be seen on the left

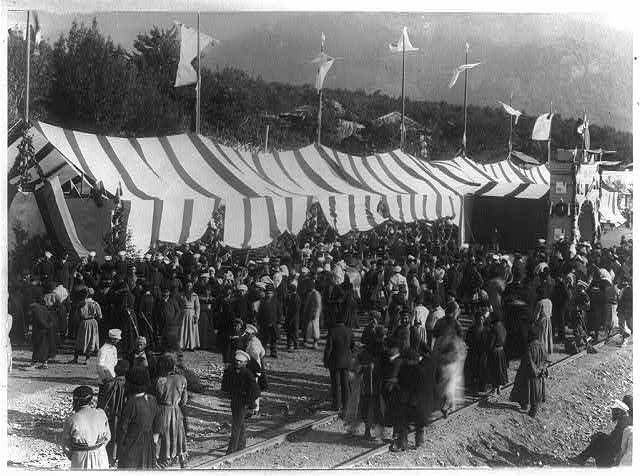
Celebration of opening Surami tunnel; ca. 1890s

Rail service through Surami Pass was opened in 1872. The rail line was electrified in 1933.
