= Pitsunda Bay =

Coordinates: 43°09′45″N 40°22′54″E

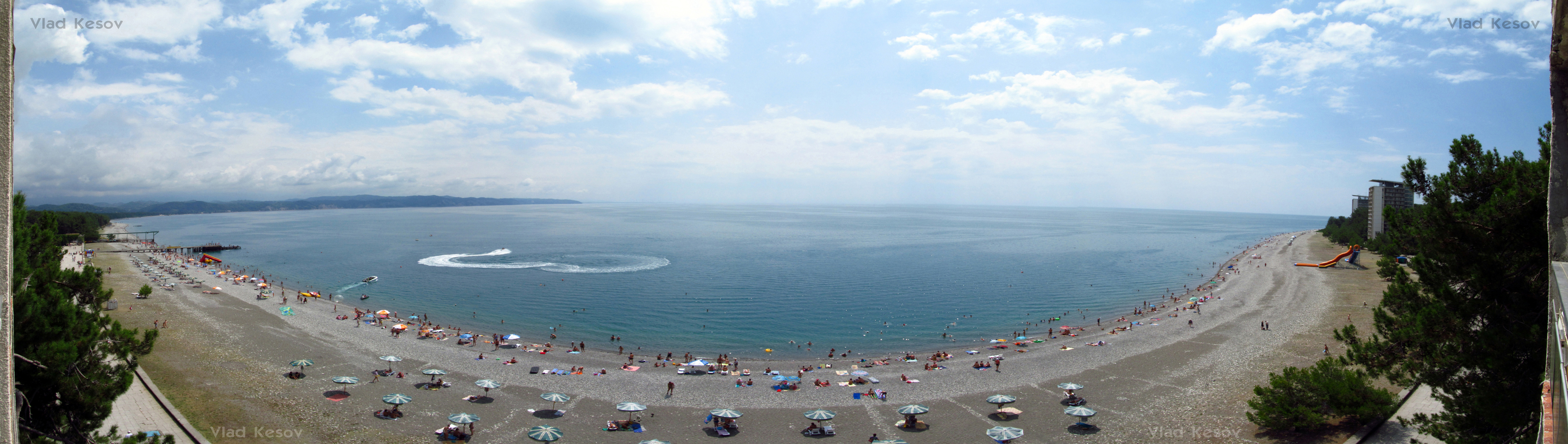

- Location within Abkhazia Location within Georgia
- Location: Black Sea
- Ocean/sea sources: Atlantic Ocean
- Basin countries: Abkhazia/Georgia
- Max. length: 2 km (1.2 mi)
- Max. width: 6 km (3.7 mi)
- Average depth: > 50 m (160 ft)

Pitsunda Bay (Georgian: ბიჭვინთის ყურე; Abkhaz: Пиҵунда абаҕуаза; Russian: Пицундская бухта) is a bay in the Black Sea near Pitsunda, Abkhazia. One of the three largest bays of the Eastern Black Sea region along with Sukhumi Bay and Batumi Bay.

== Geography ==
The depth of the bay at the entrance in the western part is over 50 m, in the northeastern part up to 20 m. The bottom of the bay silt is true, in the eastern part of the bay there are pitfalls. The rivers Adzydu and Riapshi flow into the bay. From the west, the bay is bordered by Cape Pitsunda. The eastern coast (Cape Pitsunda) is low-lying with a wide pebble beach; the northern and northeastern coast is elevated by the Musser hills, which abruptly drop off into the bay.

== History ==
The first settlements near the bay appeared in 4th century BC, later Greeks founded the ancient city and port of Pitiunt (Ancient Greek: Πιτυοῦς, "pine"). Pitsunda pine grows on the cape. The site of the relict pine forest was taken under protection.

At the beginning of the 20th century, the bay was regional center of dolphin hunting. Dolphin hunting has been banned since 1966.

The town Pitsunda, the villages of Lidzava Gagra District and Amzhikukhua Gudauta District are located on the coast of the bay. A pier is organized in Pitsunda, in the bay itself there is a roadstead for ships. Several boarding houses were built on the western coast of the bay in the 1960s: Apsny, Bzyb, Golden Fleece, Kolkheti (now Kolkhida), Amra, Iveria (now Amzara) and "Lighthouse". Also on the coast of the bay in a pine forest there was a Khrushchev's dacha and a state dacha of the President of Abkhazia.
