= Alexander Kiselyov (painter) =

Russian painter (1838–1911)

- Александр Александрович Киселёв
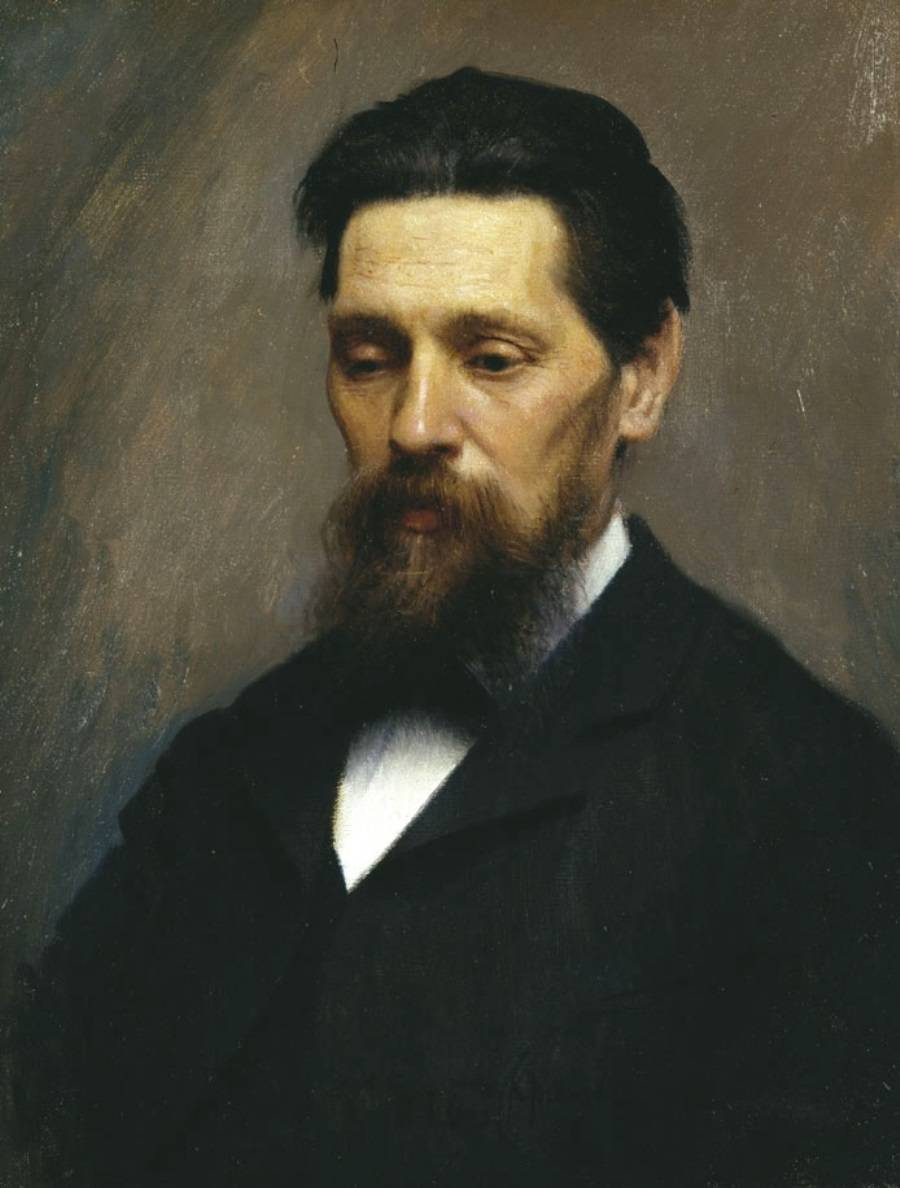
- Ivan Kramskoi, Alexander Kiselyov, 1883, oil on canvas; Tretyakov Gallery, Moscow
- Born: June 6, 1838; Sveaborg, Grand Duchy of Finland, Russian Empire
- Died: January 20, 1911 (aged 72); Saint Petersburg, Russian Empire
- Education: Member Academy of Arts (1890); Full Member Academy of Arts (1893)
- Alma mater: Imperial Academy of Arts (1865)

Alexander Alexandrovich Kiselyov, or Kiselev (Russian: Александр Александрович Киселёв; 6 June 1838 – 20 January 1911), was a Russian landscape painter.

== Biography ==
He was born to a military family at the Russian naval fortress Sveaborg and received his first schooling in the Arakcheev Cadet Corps. In 1852, he was transferred to the 2nd Saint Petersburg Cadet Corps, but resigned in 1858 before completing his training course and entered Saint Petersburg State University. The school was temporarily closed during a period of student unrest in 1861, so he transferred to the Imperial Academy of Arts. In 1864, he was awarded the title of "Artist Third-Class". The following year, he married and moved to Kharkiv, where he worked for the Kharkiv Land Bank.

In 1875, he became a member of the "Association of Travelling Art Exhibitions" (Peredvizhniki). Two years later, he relocated to Moscow and taught at a grammar school for girls. For many years, he wandered throughout Russia and the Caucasus, making sketches for paintings that he would complete at his home in Moscow. In 1893, he was named a full member of the academy and became a professor in 1897.

In 1906, in Vologda, he was one of the founders of the "Northern Circle of Fine Art Lovers", an organization which, among other things, helped young artists to get their work exhibited at the academy.

Later, as part of a team of artists, he helped to design the interior of the Alexander Nevsky Cathedral in Sofia.

His home in Tuapse (which he built in 1902) is now a museum. A large outcropping on the Black Sea coast between Cape Kadosh and Agoi is named after him, due to its appearance in one of his paintings.

== Selected paintings ==
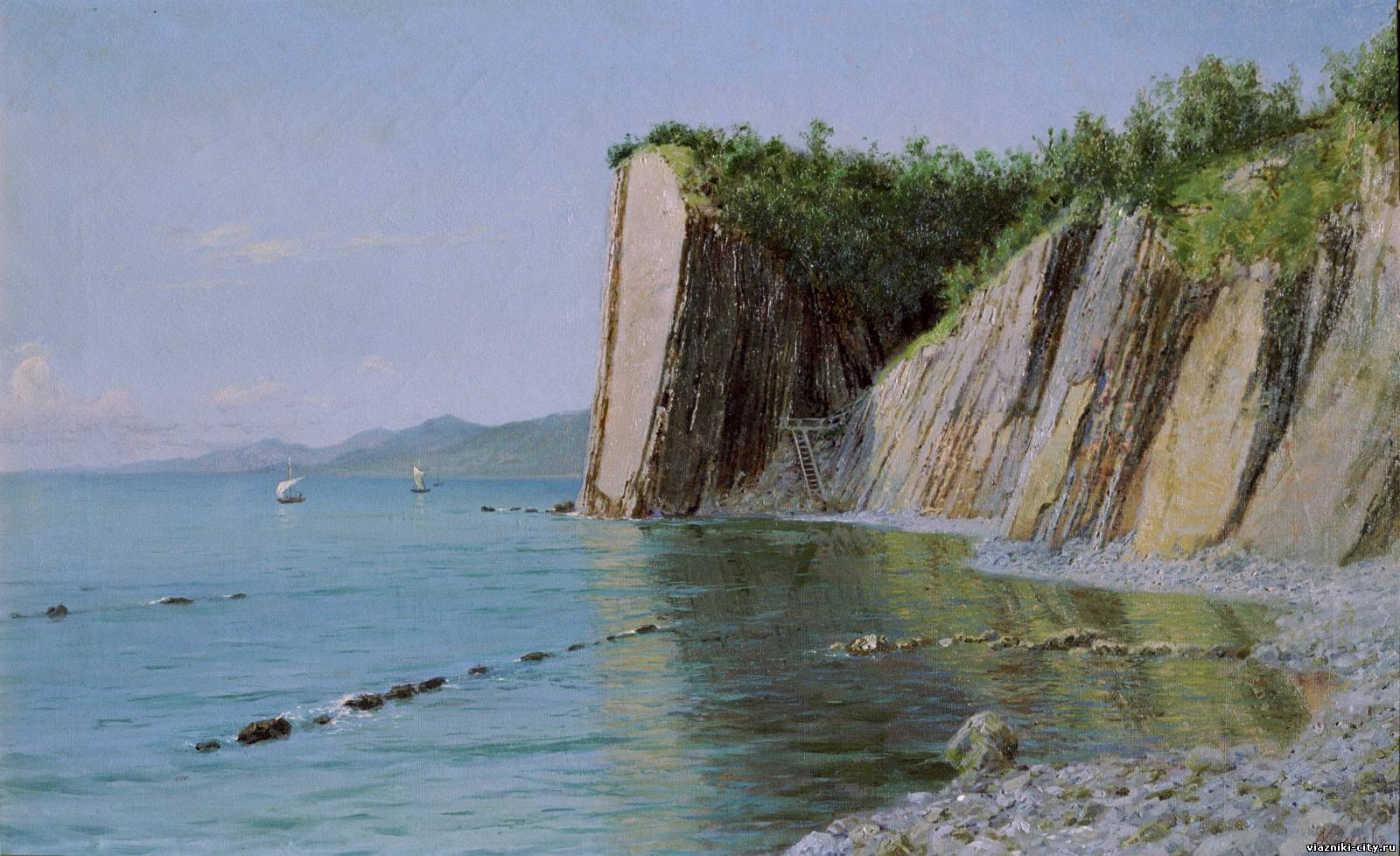
Kadoshskie rocks

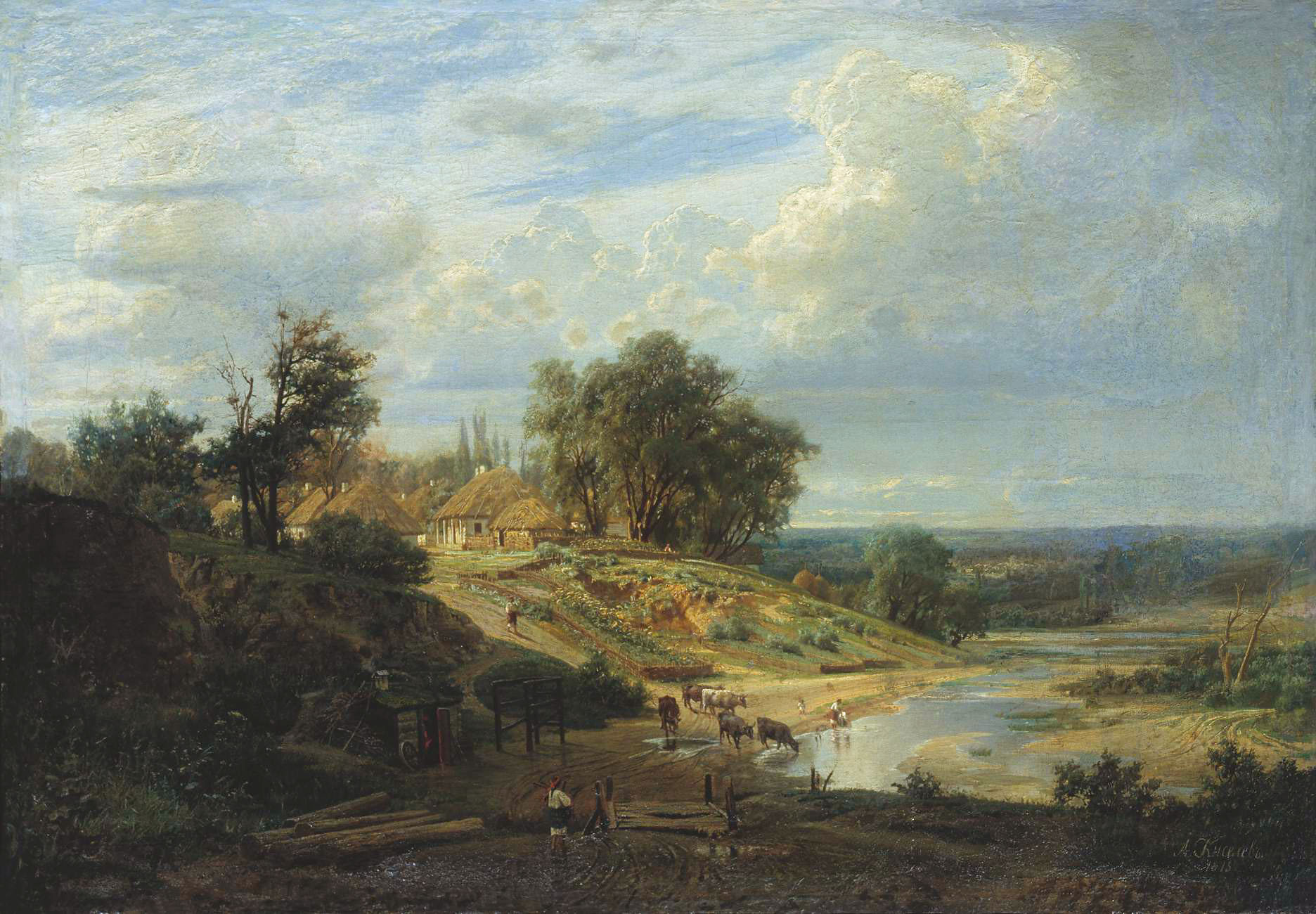
View of Kharkov surroundings (1875)

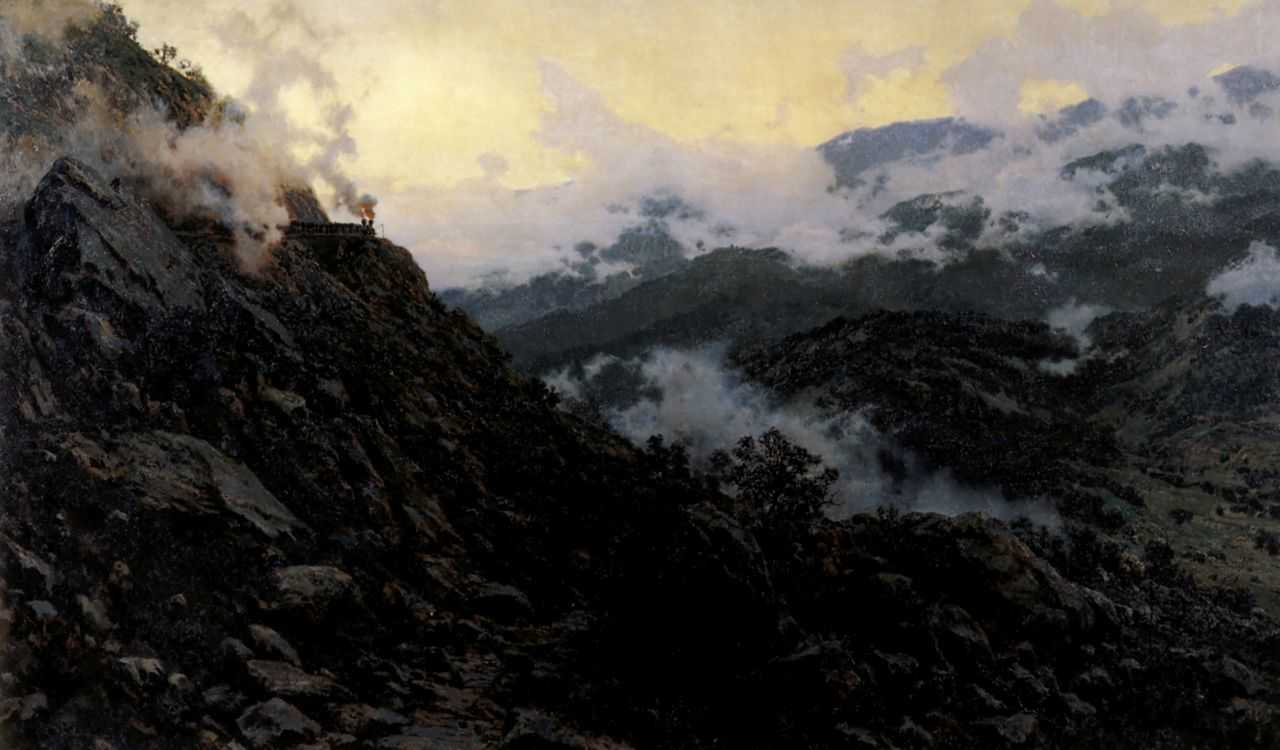
Old Surami Pass

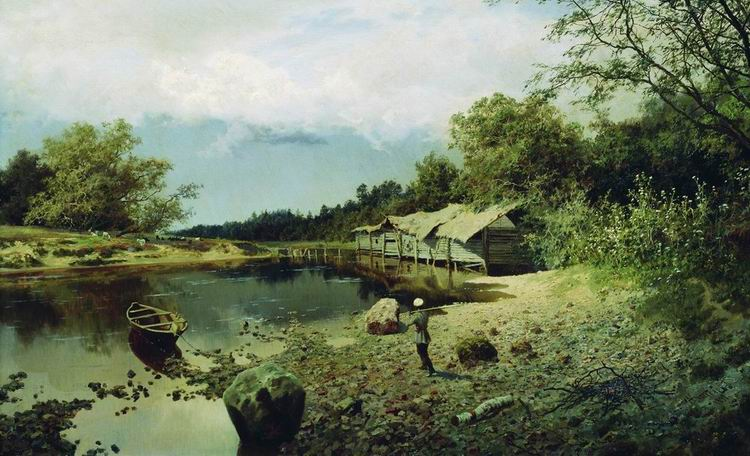
Forgotten mill (1891)

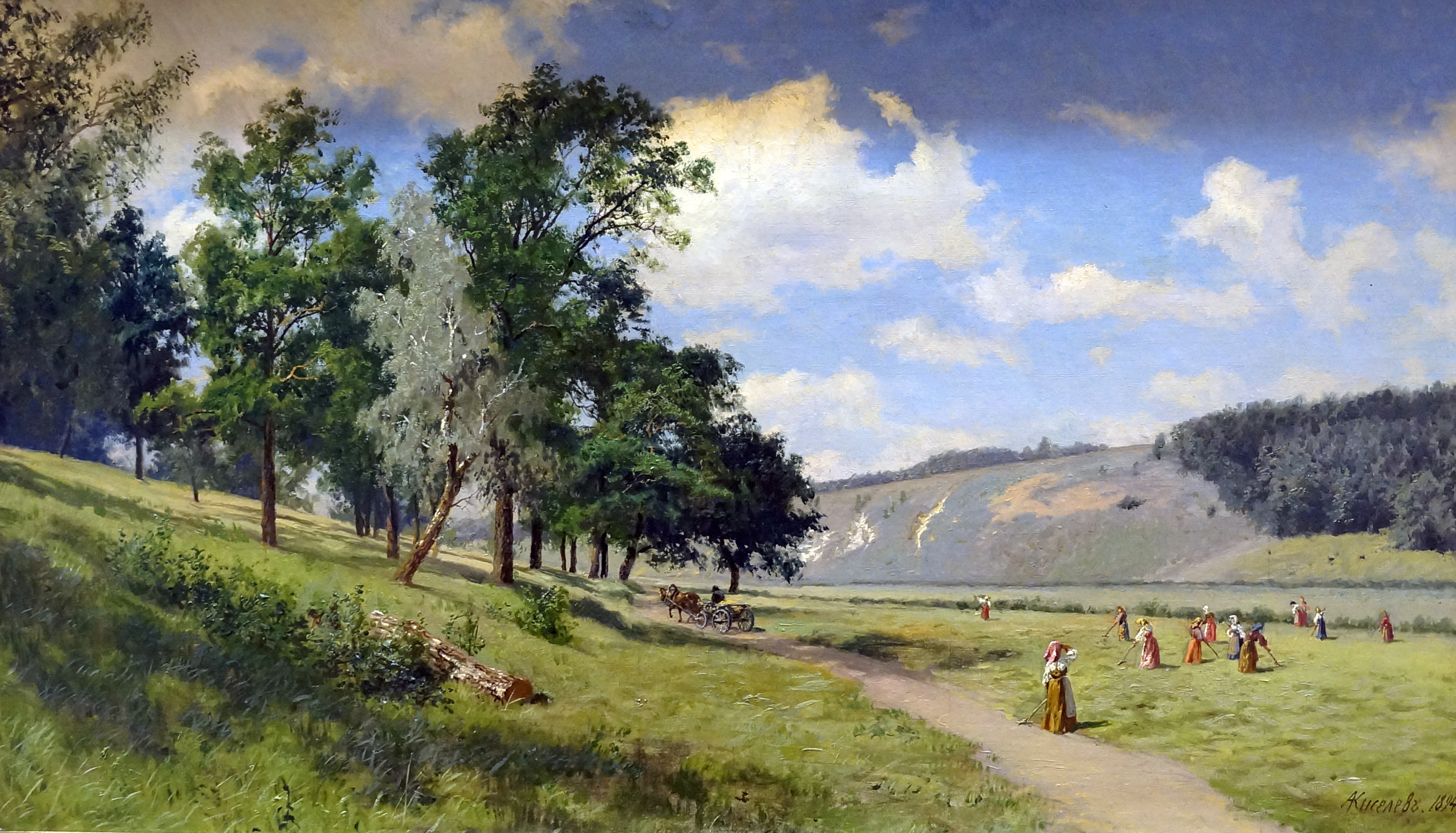
Haymaking (1894)

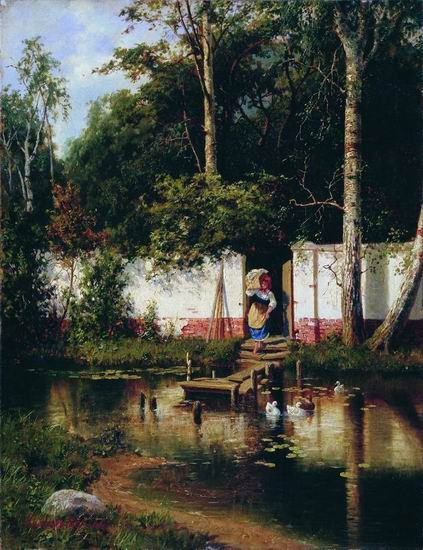
Little Pond (1892)
