= Speed limits in Georgia (country) =

Informational sign showing the standard speed limits for cars in Georgia

The speed limits in Georgia are regulated by Law of Road Safety, article 29.

== Generic limits ==
Vehicle Type	City	Rural	Motorways
Passenger cars and Light cargo vehicle (<3.5 t)	60 km/h (37 mph)	90 km/h (56 mph)	110 km/h (68 mph)
Small buses, motorcycles/quadricycles, and cars with light trailer	60 km/h	80 km/h (50 mph)	80 km/h
Regular bus or Heavy cargo vehicle (>3.5 t), with or without trailer, and car with heavy trailer	60 km/h	70 km/h (43 mph)	80 km/h
Cargo vehicle carrying passengers in load area or trailer	60 km/h	60 km/h	60 km/h
Vehicles towing other vehicles	50 km/h (31 mph)	50 km/h	50 km/h
Mopeds	45 km/h (28 mph)	45 km/h	N/A
Tractor and "Class S" vehicles	40 km/h (25 mph)	40 km/h	N/A
E-Scooters	20 km/h (12 mph)	20 km/h	N/A

In all cases, the limit for residential areas, as opposed to wider built-up areas, is 20 km/h. Oversize loads and hazardous cargoes attract their own specific limits on a case by case basis not directly detailed in the highway legislation.

The legislation as written does not make it clear what "Class S" consists of, besides "Special Vehicles". Inference from the wider document, and the use of the category in other European countries would suggest "Snowmobiles and Motor Sledges", as well as light tricycles ("voiturettes") with which these share some superficial design features.

== Limits in urban areas ==
There are several streets in Tbilisi, Batumi and Kutaisi where the speed limit is higher than generic limit (60 km/h). For example:

- Embankments of Mtkvari river in Tbilisi have limit of 70 km/h
- George W. Bush street (airport route) in Tbilisi has limit of 80 km/h

== Limits in rural areas ==
Historically, the maximum speed limit in Georgia was 90 km/h, as there were no motorways in the country. With the change of government in 2004 and activation of country's economy, the construction of first motorway started. The motorway forms one of the main transit routes of the country – S1/E60. Currently, the motorway part of the route spans from north exit of Tbilisi to Zemo Osiauri, a small village near Khashuri.
