= Wissol Petroleum =

Wissol Petroleum ვისოლ პეტროლიუმი
- Company type: J.S.C.
- Industry: Oil and gasoline
- Founded: 2000
- Headquarters: Tbilisi, Georgia
- Key people: Vasil Khorava, (CEO)
- Products: petroleum and derived products service stations
- Number of employees: 1000 (2009)
- Website: www.wissol.ge

Wissol Petroleum is a daughter brand of Wissol Group, one of the largest retailer business groups in Georgia.

This Georgian oil company operates the widest network of service stations in the country and runs over 100 fuel stations, nowadays providing services and products in every district of Tbilisi and elsewhere in the country. Further development of the network is underway.

Established in 2000, the company completed its process of re-branding in 2005 and entered the market with the name Wissol.

The company sells EKO Super, Premium, and Diesel branded fuel products sourced from Greece, as well as "Euro" petroleum products sourced from throughout Europe. In 2010, Wissol Petroleum signed an agreement with Total and became an exclusive distributor of Total branded lubricants in Georgia.

Wissol also holds the franchise rights for Wendy's, Dunkin' Donuts, and Subway in Georgia. It maintains its own brand of small supermarkets called "Smart." It is common for a Wissol fuel station to be paired with one or more of their branded stores.

== Fuel Source Controversies ==
Overall, the supply of petroleum products originating from Russia has remained stable at roughly 41% – 42% of Georgia’s total imports — about 477 thousand tons of oil and oil products. Of that amount, Wissol accounted for approximately 65 thousand tons of Russian petroleum products, making it the third-largest importer of Russian oil and oil products in 2024. In 2022, Wissol’s president stated that, as a business, Wissol would “purchase fuel from the cheapest provider, including Russia.”

By contrast, in 2024 the president of the Business Association of Georgia announced that the country had moved away from Russian petrol, replacing it with European-sourced fuel after Russia’s ban on gasoline exports.

== See also ==
- Energy in Georgia (country)
