= Sukhumi Bay =

Coordinates: 42°57′48″N 41°02′18″E

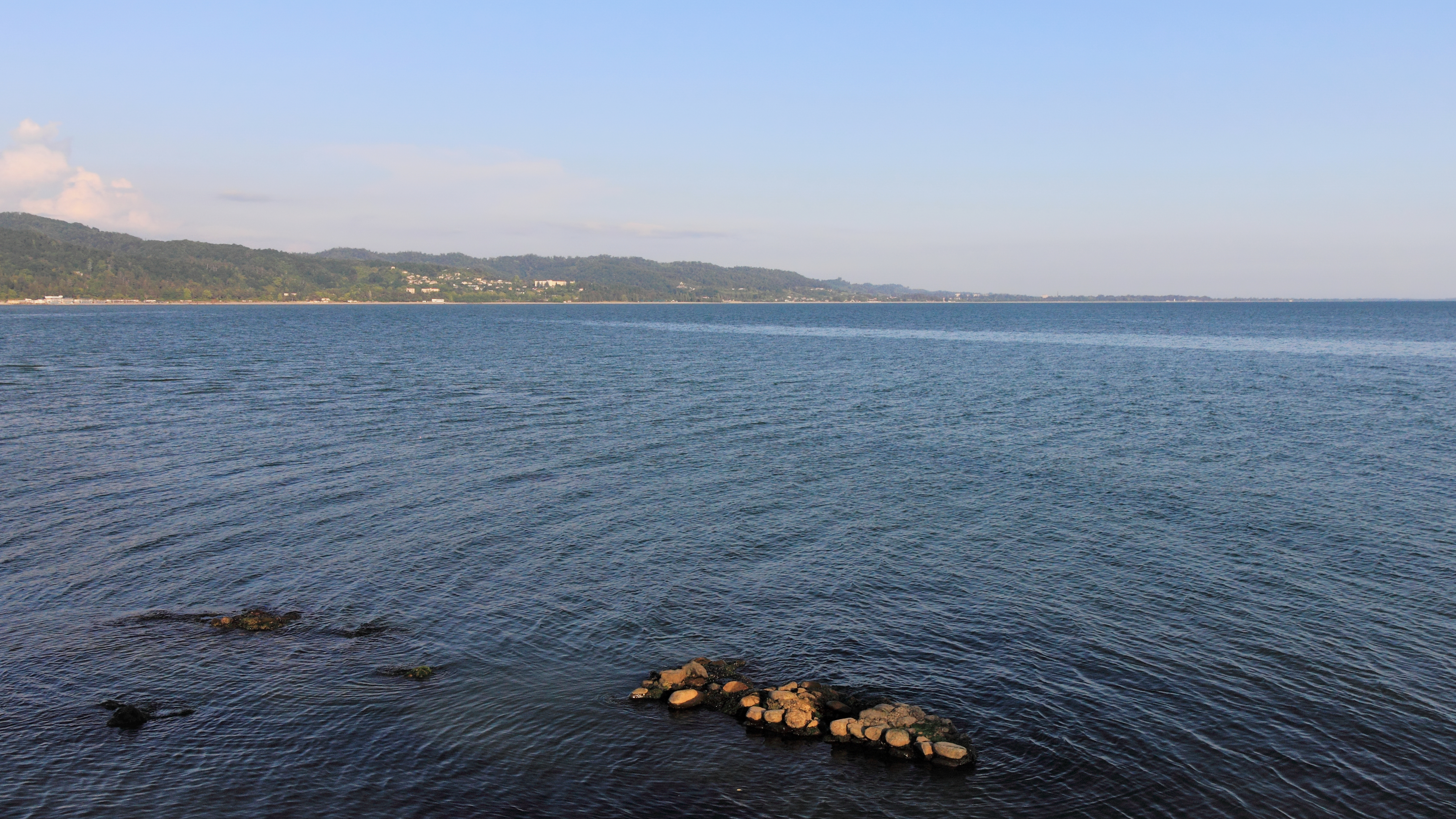

- Location within Abkhazia Location within Georgia
- Location: Black Sea
- Ocean/sea sources: Atlantic Ocean
- Basin countries: Abkhazia/Georgia
- Max. length: 5 km (3.1 mi)
- Max. width: 18 km (11 mi)
- Average depth: > 400 m (1,300 ft)

Sukhumi Bay or Sokhumi Bay (Georgian: სოხუმის ყურე; Russian: Сухумская бухта or залив Сухуми) is a bay in the Black Sea near Sukhumi, Abkhazia.
