= Akkord Industry Construction Investment Corporation =

Akkord Industry Construction Investment Corporation OJSC
- Founded: 2005
- Headquarters: Azerbaijan
- Key people: Ilgar Hajiyev Founder; Hikmat Garibov Director
- Number of employees: 5,000
- Website: Akkord

Akkord Industry Construction Investment Corporation OJSC is an Azerbaijani company that does construction work and produces construction materials. The company builds infrastructure projects in Georgia, Ukraine, Kazakhstan, Uzbekistan, and Turkey.

According to the company website, Akkord has completed $1.7 billion worth of construction projects. Current (as of July 2013) projects total $1.9 billion.

== Facilities ==
Akkord owns and operates 40 plants within Azerbaijan. Akkord also has offices in Albania, Georgia, Germany, Kazakhstan, Russia, Turkey, Ukraine and Uzbekistan.

=== Gazakh Cement Plant ===
The International Bank of Azerbaijan (IBA) financed the construction of a cement plant located in the Gazakh region of Azerbaijan. Construction of the plant was completed in 2013. The plant is the second cement plant in Azerbaijan.

== Key people ==
Ilgar Hajiyev

Vugar Suleymanov

== Products and Services ==
=== Construction ===
Akkord builds:

- Bridges
- Public facilities
- Real estate
- Concrete and Asphalt pavement Roads
- Tunnels & Intersections

=== Production and Distribution ===
Akkord manufactures and distributes construction materials:

- Textile
- Paint
- Asphalt
- Bricks
- Concrete
- Fabricated metal products
- Gravel-sand
- Precast concrete
- Marble & Granite
- Cement

== Markets ==
=== International ===
Akkord has contracts with construction and production companies from around the world, “among which are noteworthy” (according to Trend News Agency) are:

- Bouygues (France)
- Condotte (Italy)
- Freyssinet (France)
- Herrenknecht (Germany)
- Salini Impregilo (Italy)
- China National Materials Group Corporation (China)
- Unger Stahlbau (Germany)
