= Pietro Ruisi =

Italian footballer and manager

Pietro Ruisi (born 6 January 1955 in Palermo) is a retired Italian footballer and manager. He played as a midfielder. He played one match in Serie A for Palermo on 20 May 1973 against Ternana. In 1986, he began his career as a manager. His coaching style was influenced by Zdenek Zeman. During his career he managed many squads including Messina, Taranto, Gela and Bitonto.

== Career ==
- 1972-1973 Palermo 1 (0)
- 1973-1974 Pro Vasto 0 (0)

== Career as a manager ==
- 1986-1990 Licata (Assistant)
- 1990-1991 Messina Primavera
- 1992-1993 Messina
- 1994-1995 Civitanovese
- 1995-1997 Taranto
- 1997-1999 Messina
- 1999-2000 Trapani
- 2000-2001 Matera
- 2001-2003 Gela
- 2004-2006 Bitonto
- 2006-2007 Genzano
- 2007-2008 Matera
- 2008-2009 Bitonto
- 2010- Francavilla Calcio
