= Likhi Range =

Mountain range in Georgia

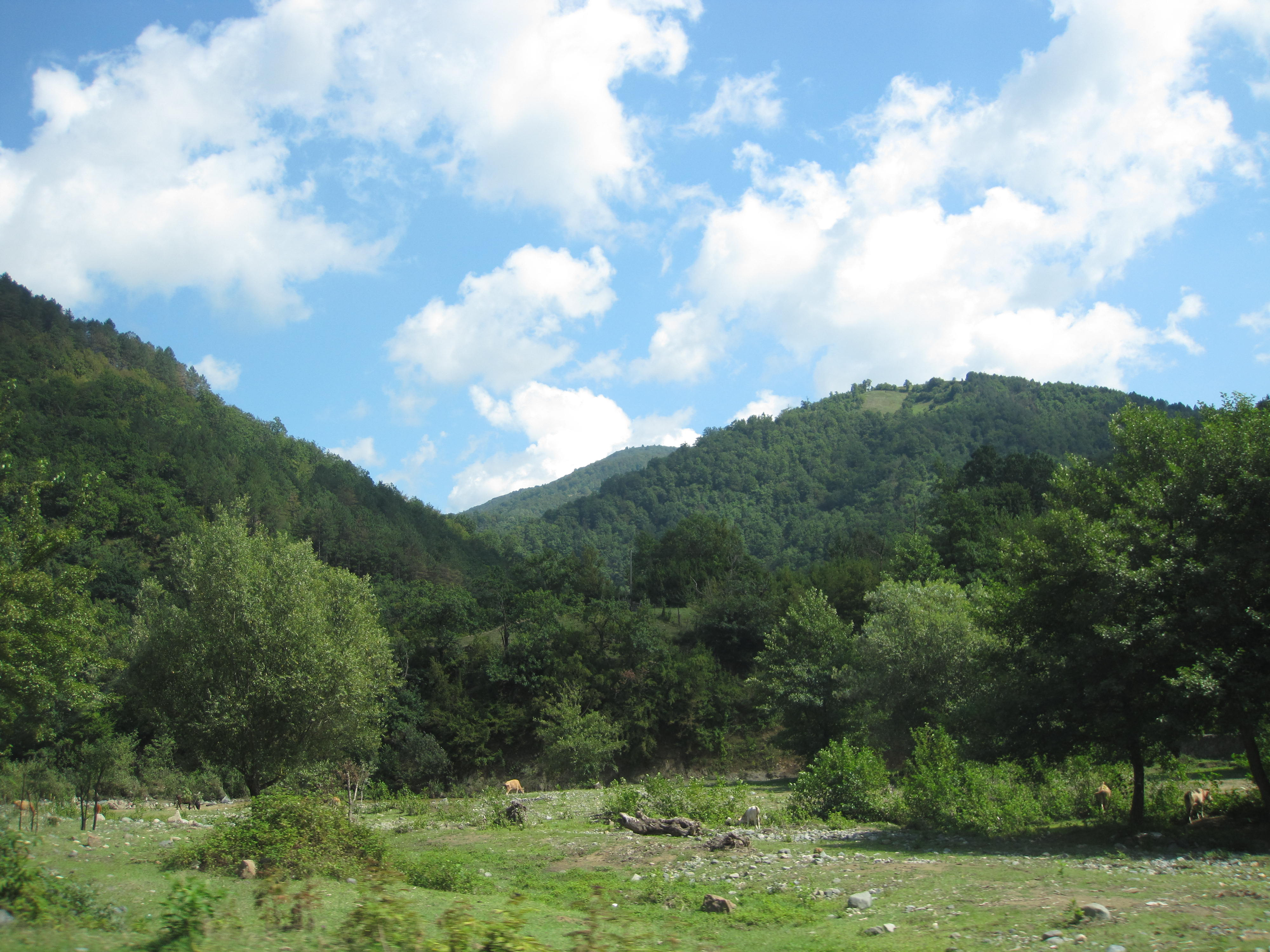
- Landscapes at the base of the Likhi range

Highest point
- Elevation: 1,926 m (6,319 ft)

Geography
- Location within Imereti Location within Shida Kartli Location within Georgia
- Country: Georgia
- Range coordinates: 42°11′54″N 43°29′54″E
- Parent range: Caucasus Mountains

Likhi Range (Georgian: ლიხის ქედი, romanized: likhis kedi) or Surami Range (Georgian: სურამის ქედი, romanized: suramis kedi) is a mountain range in Georgia. It connects the Greater Caucasus mountains of the north with the Lesser Caucasus range in the south. Serving as a watershed of the Black and Caspian seas basins, Likhi Range bisects Georgia into western and eastern halves, giving them a distinct historical, climactic and geomorphological character.

The highest point in the range is the Ribisa mountain, at 2,470 m (8,100 ft) above sea level. The lowest and most important mountain pass is the Surami Pass at an elevation of 949 m (3,114 ft) which links eastern and western Georgia. A railroad (in the tunnel) runs through the pass, as well as the Zestaponi-Khashuri highway. A southern portion of the Likhi range was historically known as Ghado.

== See also ==
- Rikoti Pass
- Meskheti Range
