= Rikoti Pass =

Mountain pass in Georgia

- Georgian: რიკოთის უღელტეხილი
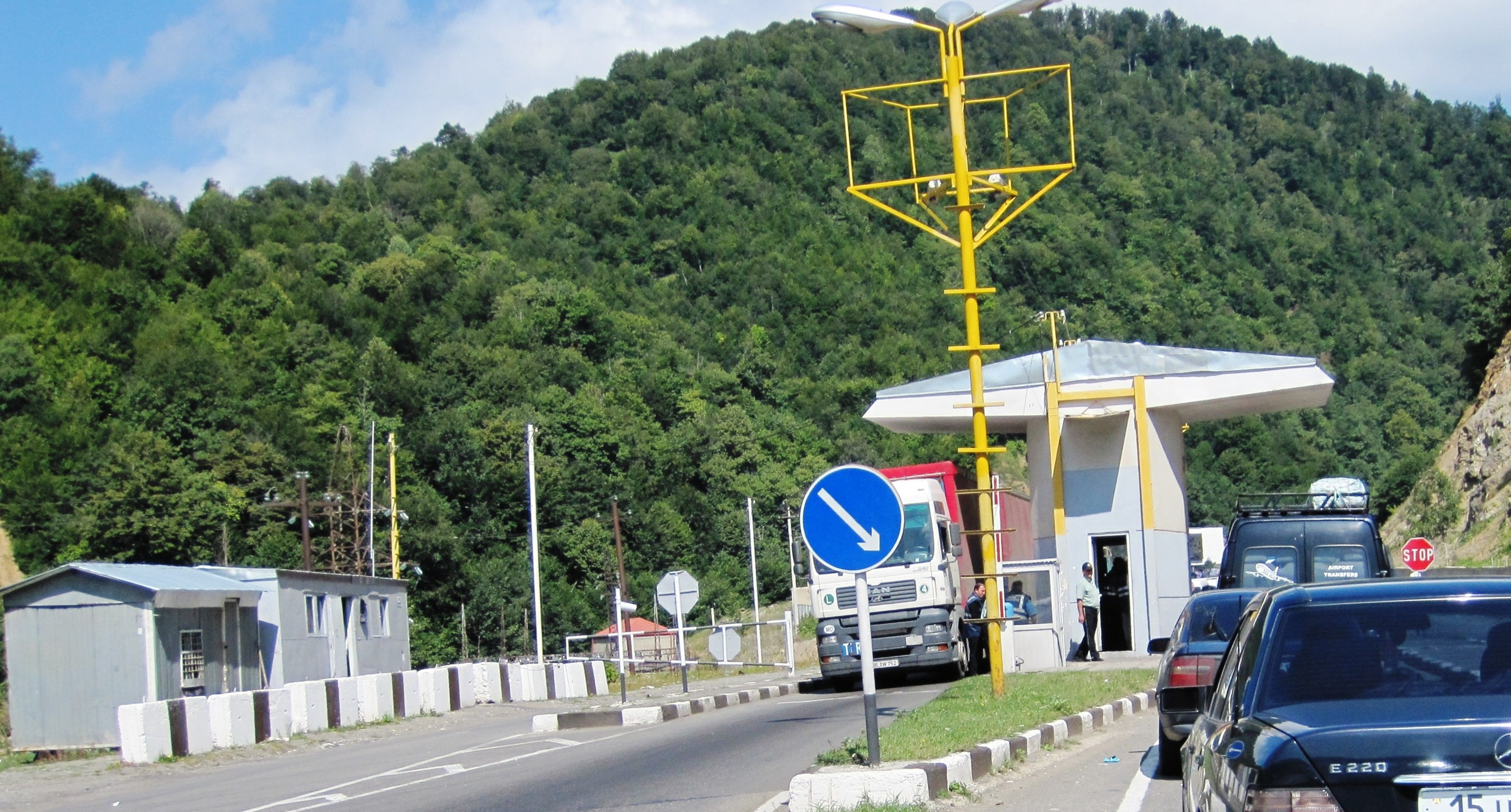

- Location within Georgia
- Interactive map of Rikoti Pass
- Elevation: 996 metres (3,268 ft)

Third Approach
- Location: Georgia
- Range: Likhi Range
- Coordinates: 42°03′09″N 43°29′31″E

The Rikoti Pass (Georgian: რიკოთის უღელტეხილი) (el. 996 metres or 3,268 feet) is a mountain pass in the southern portion of the Likhi Range, a spur of the Greater Caucasus which divides Georgia into its western and eastern parts. The Tbilisi-Kutaisi highway connecting the two major cities of Georgia runs through the pass via a rock-cut tunnel of 1,722 m (5,650 ft) in length, which was constructed in 1982.
