= Dolores Hoffmann =

Estonian stained glass artist

Dolores Hoffmann is an Estonian stained glass artist who lives and works in Tallinn, with her works decorating the interiors of several churches in Estonia's old town and other public buildings and private businesses internationally.

== Biography ==
Hoffmann was born in Leningrad in the USSR in September 1937 to an Estonian mother and a German father, who were both persecuted by the Soviet secret police. Hoffmann grew up in a Russian orphanage speaking Russian, and only arrived in Estonia after WWII in 1945, where she started learning Estonian for the first time and became a "staunch anti-Soviet". She trained as a painter before becoming a glass artist, and converting to Christianity despite religious crackdowns in the USSR.

== Notable works ==
Television is a Window to the World, Tallinn TV Tower

Batumi Piazza, stained glass windows

Church of the Holy Spirit, Tallinn
