= Batumi =

City in Georgia and the capital of Adjara

Batumi ბათუმი
- City
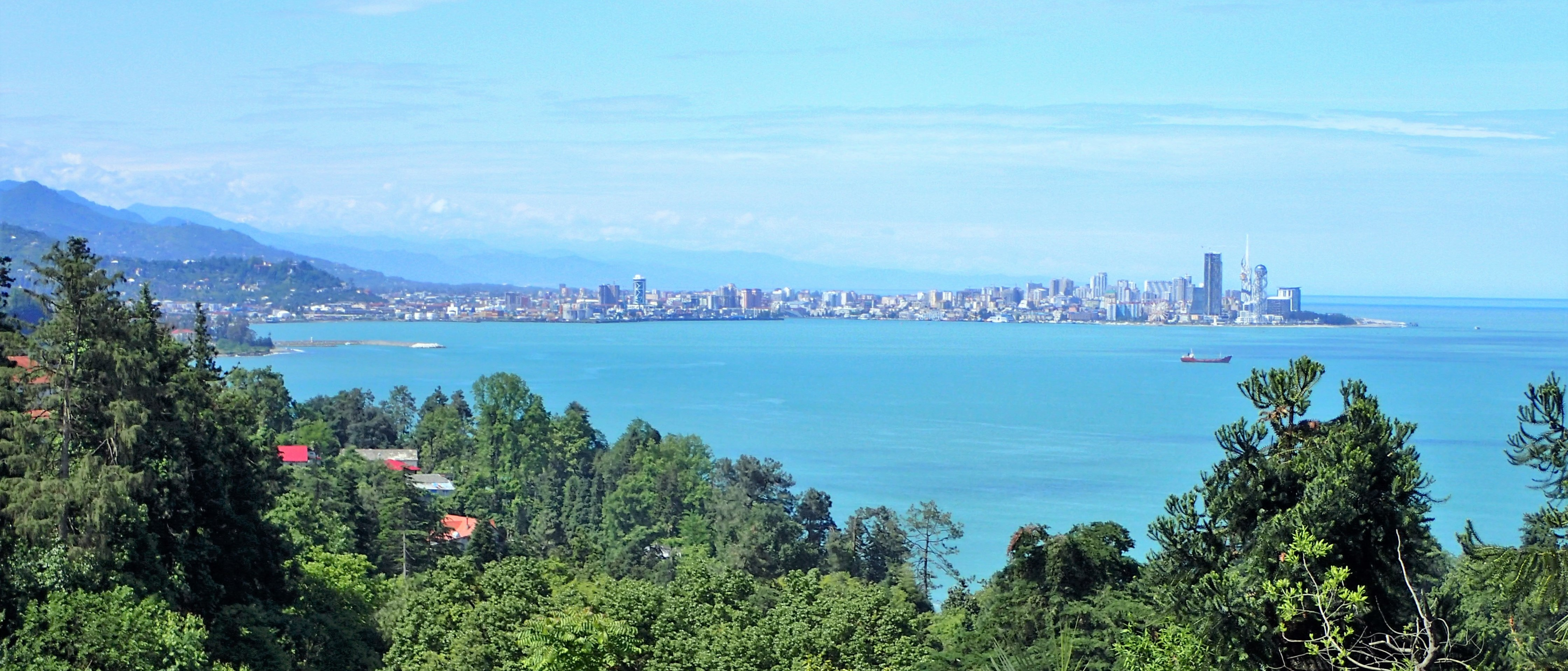
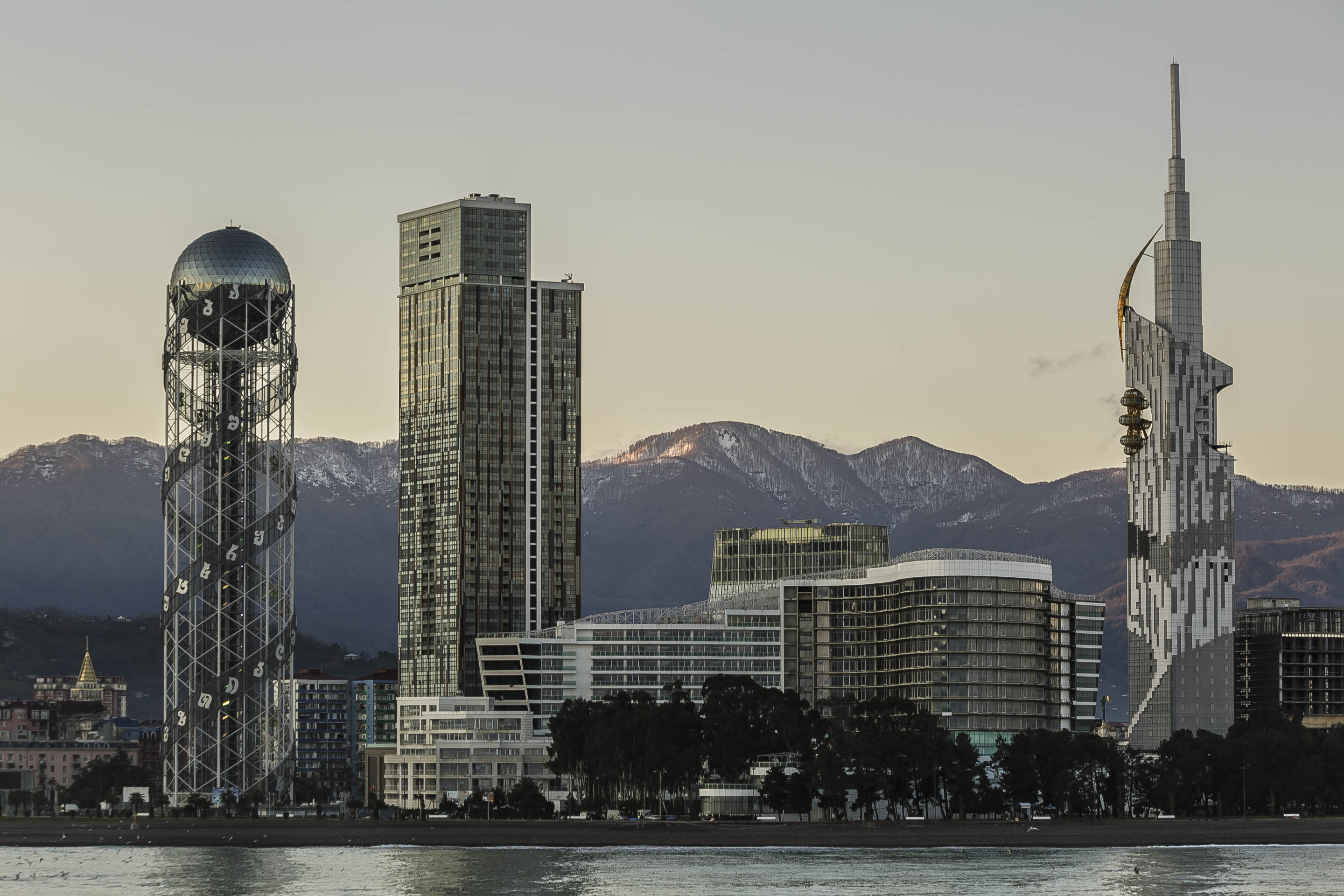
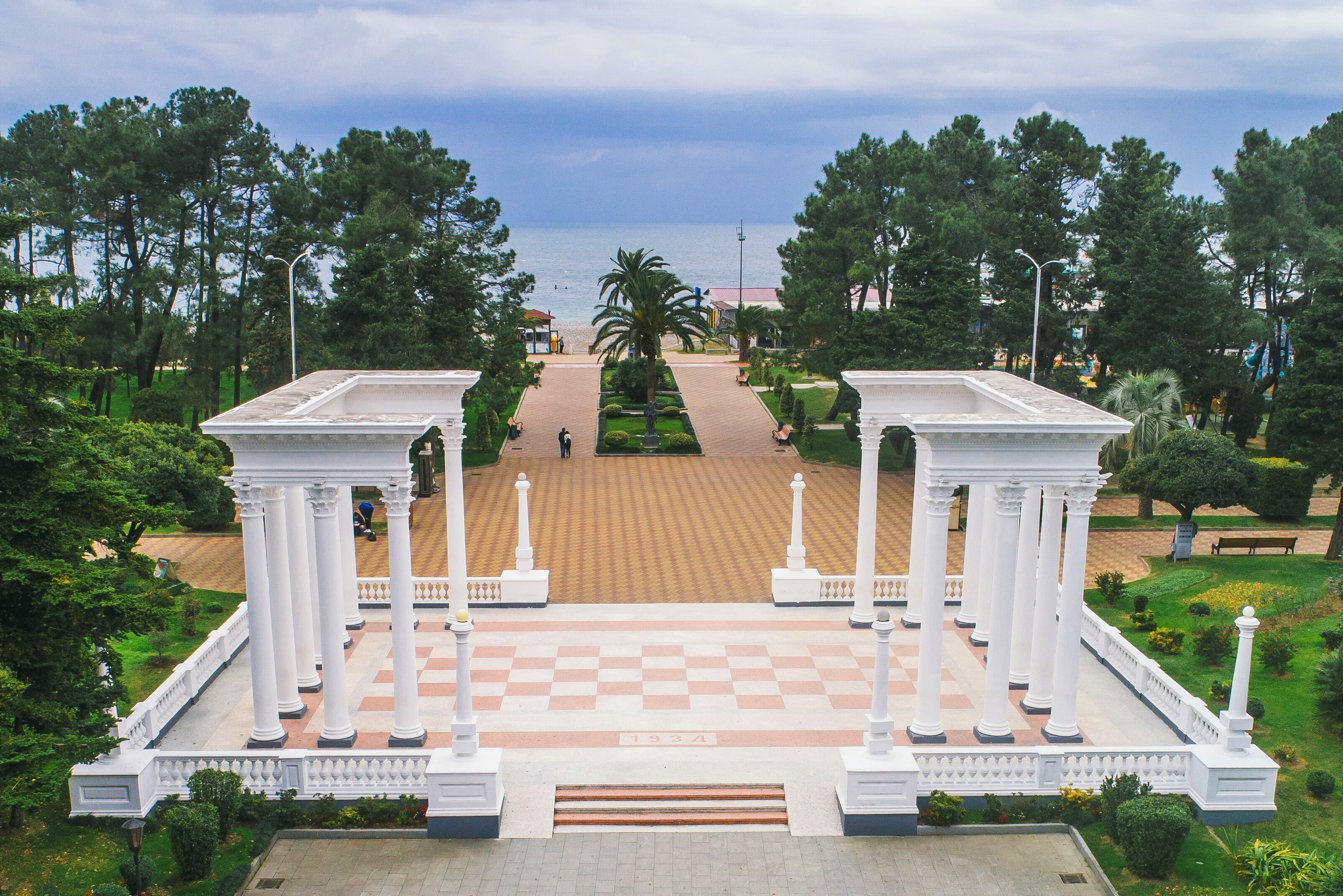
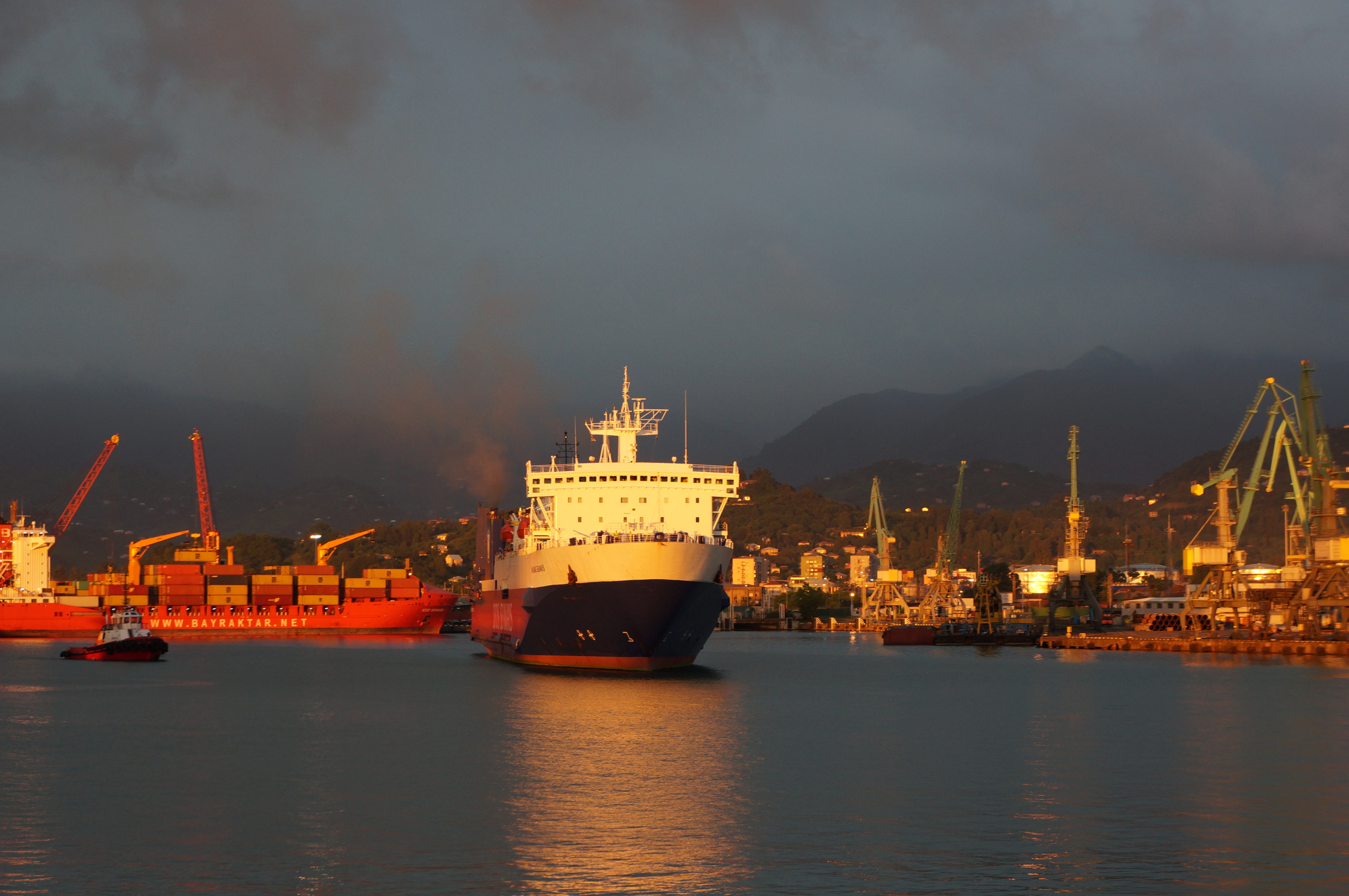
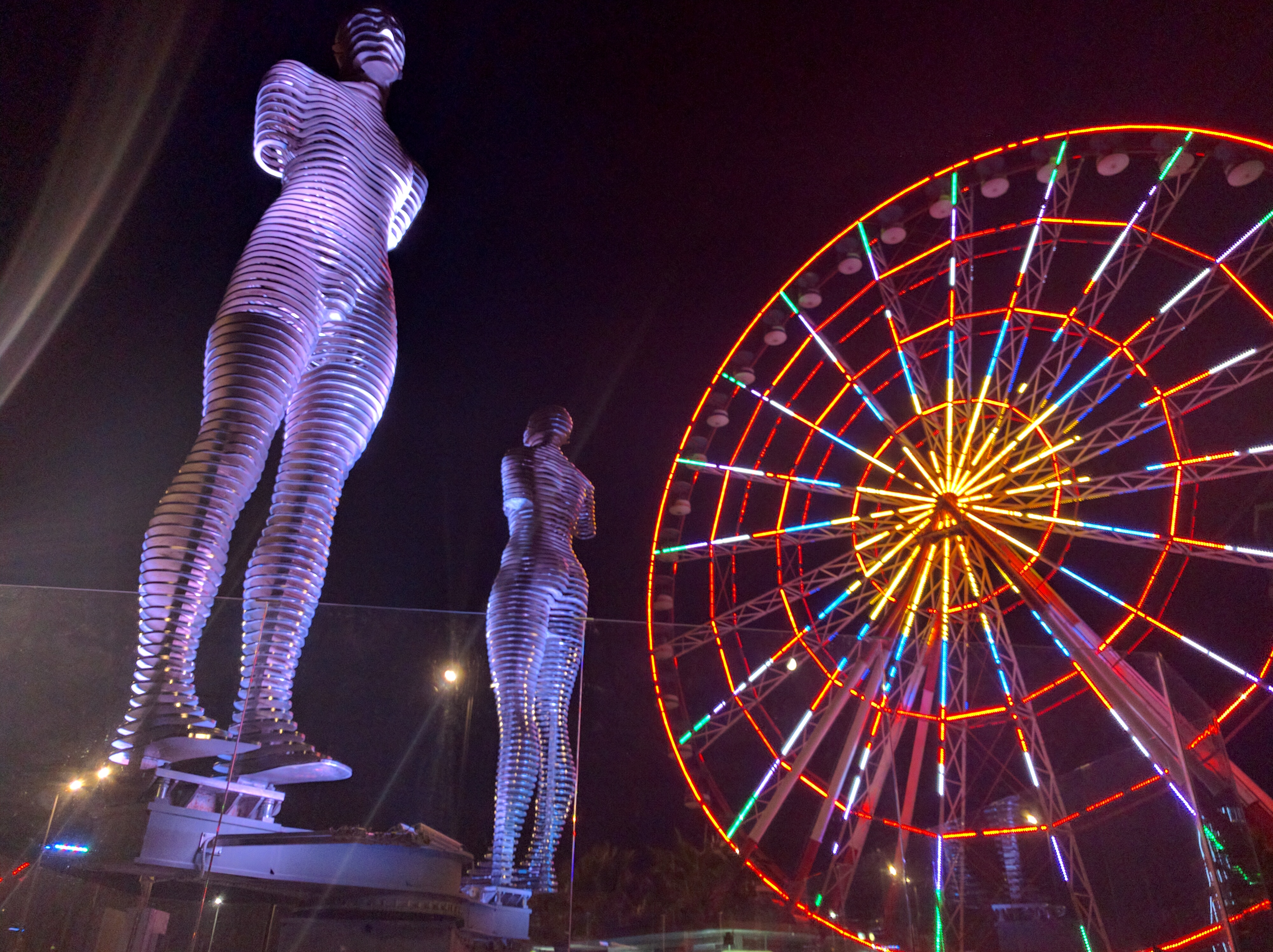
- Batumi Bay seen from Botanical Garden City skyline and Lesser Caucasus mountains Colonnades of the seaside boulevard Batumi Seaport Ali and Nino

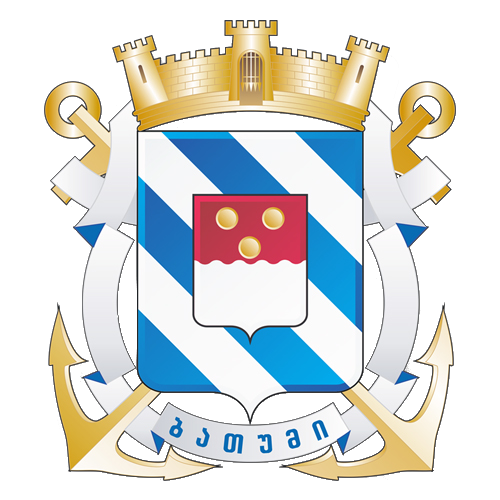
- Flag Coat of arms

- Location within Georgia Location within Adjara Location within Caucasus Region
- Coordinates: 41°38′45″N 41°38′30″E
- Country: Georgia
- Autonomous republic: Adjara
- Founded: 8th century
- City status: 1866

Government
  - Type: Mayor–Council
  - Body: Batumi City Assembly
  - Mayor: Archil Chikovani (GD)

Area
  - Total: 82.3 km^{2} (31.8 sq mi)
- Elevation: 3 m (9.8 ft)

Population (2026)
  - Total: 246,300
  - Rank: 2nd in Georgia
  - Density: 2,989/km^{2} (7,740/sq mi)

GDP (Nominal, 2024)
  - Metro: ₾7.516 billion (US$2.870 billion)
  - Per capita: ₾30,516 (US$11,652)
- Time zone: UTC+4 (Georgian Time)
- Postal code: 6000-6010
- Area code: (+995) 422
- Website: batumi.gov.ge

Batumi (/bɑːˈtuːmi/; Georgian: ბათუმი pronounced [ˈb̥a'tʰu.mi]) is the second-largest city of Georgia and the capital of Georgia's Autonomous Republic of Adjara, located on the coast of the Black Sea in Georgia's southwest, 20 kilometres (12 mi) north of the border with Turkey. It is situated in a subtropical zone at the foot of the Caucasus. Much of Batumi's economy revolves around tourism and gambling (it is nicknamed "The Las Vegas of the Black Sea"), but the city is also an important seaport and includes industries like shipbuilding, food processing and light manufacturing. Since 2010, Batumi has been transformed by the construction of modern high-rise buildings, as well as the restoration of classical 19th-century edifices lining its historic Old Town. Batumi joined the UNESCO Global Network of Learning Cities in 2022.

== History ==
Timeline of Batumi
Historical affiliations

Lazica (to 780)
Kingdom of Abkhazia, 780–1010
Kingdom of Georgia, 1010–1455
Kingdom of Imereti 1455–1703
Ottoman Empire, 1703–1878
Russian Empire, 1878–1918
British Empire, 1918–1920
Dem. Rep. of Georgia, 1920–1921
USSR (Adj. ASSR in G.SSR) 1921–1991
Adjara (de facto independent, de jure part of Georgia) 1991–2004
Georgia (AR of Adjara), 1991 (2004)–present

=== Early history ===
Batumi is located on the site of the ancient Greek colony in Colchis called "Bathus" or "Bathys", derived from (Ancient Greek: βαθύς λιμεν, bathus limen; or βαθύς λιμήν, bathys limēn; lit. the 'deep harbor'). Under Hadrian (c. 117–138 AD), it was converted into a fortified Roman port and later deserted for the fortress of Petra founded in the time of Justinian I (c. 527–565). Garrisoned by the Roman-Byzantine forces, it was formally a possession of the kingdom of Lazica until being occupied briefly by the Arabs, who did not hold it; In 780 Lazica fell to kingdom of Abkhazia via a dynastic union; the latter led the unification of the Georgian monarchy in the 11th century.

From 1010, it was governed by the eristavi (ერისთავი, viceroy) of the king of Georgia. In the late 15th century, after the disintegration of the Georgian kingdom, Batumi passed to the princes (mtavari, მთავარი) of Guria, a western Georgian principality under the sovereignty of the kings of Imereti.

A curious incident occurred in 1444 when a Burgundian flotilla, after a failed crusade against the Ottoman Empire, penetrated the Black Sea and engaged in piracy along its eastern coastline until the Burgundians under the knight Geoffroy de Thoisy were ambushed while landing to raid Vaty, as Europeans then knew Batumi. De Thoisy was taken captive and released through the mediation of the emperor John IV of Trebizond.

=== Ottoman rule ===
In the 15th century in the reign of the prince Kakhaber Gurieli, the Ottomans conquered the town and its district but did not hold them. They returned to it in force a century later and inflicted a decisive defeat on the Georgian armies at Sokhoista. Batumi was recaptured by the Georgians several times, first in 1546 by prince Rostom Gurieli, who lost it soon afterwards, and again in 1609 by Mamia II Gurieli. In 1703, Batumi again became part of the Ottoman Empire. In the one-and-a-half century of Ottoman rule it grew into a provincial port serving the Empire's hinterlands on the eastern fringes of the Black Sea. After the Ottoman conquest, Islamization of the hitherto Christian region began but this was terminated and to a great degree reversed, after the area was annexed to Russian Imperial Georgia after the Russo-Turkish War of 1877–78.

=== Imperial Russian rule ===
It was the last Black Sea port annexed by Russia during the Russian conquest of that area of the Caucasus. In 1878, Batumi was annexed by the Russian Empire in accordance with the Treaty of San Stefano between Russia and the Ottoman Empire (ratified on 23 March). Occupied by the Russians on 28 August 1878, the town was declared a free port until 1886. It functioned as the center of a special military district until being incorporated in the Kutaisi Governorate on 12 June 1883. Finally, on 1 June 1903, with the Artvin Okrug, the Batum Okrug was established as the Batum Oblast and placed under the direct administration of the Viceroy of the Caucasus.

The expansion of Batumi began with the construction of the Batumi–Tiflis–Baku Transcaucasus Railway (completed in 1883), and the Baku–Batumi pipeline which opened in 1907. Henceforth, Batumi became the chief Russian oil port in the Black Sea. The population increased rapidly doubling within 20 years: from 8,671 inhabitants in 1882 to 12,000 in 1889. By 1902 the population had reached 16,000, with 1,000 working in the refinery for Baron Rothschild's Caspian and Black Sea Oil Company.

In the late 1880s and after, more than 7,400 Doukhobor emigrants sailed for Canada from Batumi, after the government agreed to let them emigrate. Quakers and Tolstoyans aided in collecting funds for the relocation of the religious minority, which had come into conflict with the Imperial government over its refusal to serve in the military and other positions. Canada settled them in Manitoba and Saskatchewan.

=== Russian Civil War, Soviet Union, and 1991 independence ===
During 1901, sixteen years prior to the October Revolution, Joseph Stalin, the future leader of the Soviet Union, lived in the city organizing strikes. On 3 March 1918, the Treaty of Brest-Litovsk gave the city back to the Ottoman Empire, confirmed in the Treaty of Batum of June 1918 between the Ottoman Empire and the new Democratic Republic of Georgia. As result of the end of World War I the British took control over Batumi from December 1918, who stayed until July 1920 when the city and province was transferred to the Democratic Republic of Georgia, which gave Adjara autonomy. In 1921 Kemal Atatürk ceded the northern part of Adjara, including Batumi, to the Bolsheviks who reconquered the Transcaucasian republics, on the condition that it be granted autonomy for the sake of the Muslims among Batumi's mixed population.

When Georgia regained its independence from the Soviet Union in 1991, Aslan Abashidze was appointed head of Adjara's governing council and subsequently held onto power throughout the unrest of the 1990s. While Abkhazia and South Ossetia areas attempted to break away from the Georgian state, Adjara remained an integral part of the republic. Instead, Abashidze turned Adjara into his personal fiefdom. In May 2004, he fled to Russia after mass protests in Batumi, which concluded the 2004 Adjara crisis.

=== Post-1991 ===
Batumi today is one of the main port cities of Georgia. It has the capacity for 80,000-ton tankers to take materials such as oil that are shipped through Georgia from Central Asia. Additionally, the city exports regional agricultural products. Since 1995 the freight conversion of the port has constantly risen, with an approximate 8 million tons in 2001. The annual revenue from the port is estimated at between $200 million and $300 million.

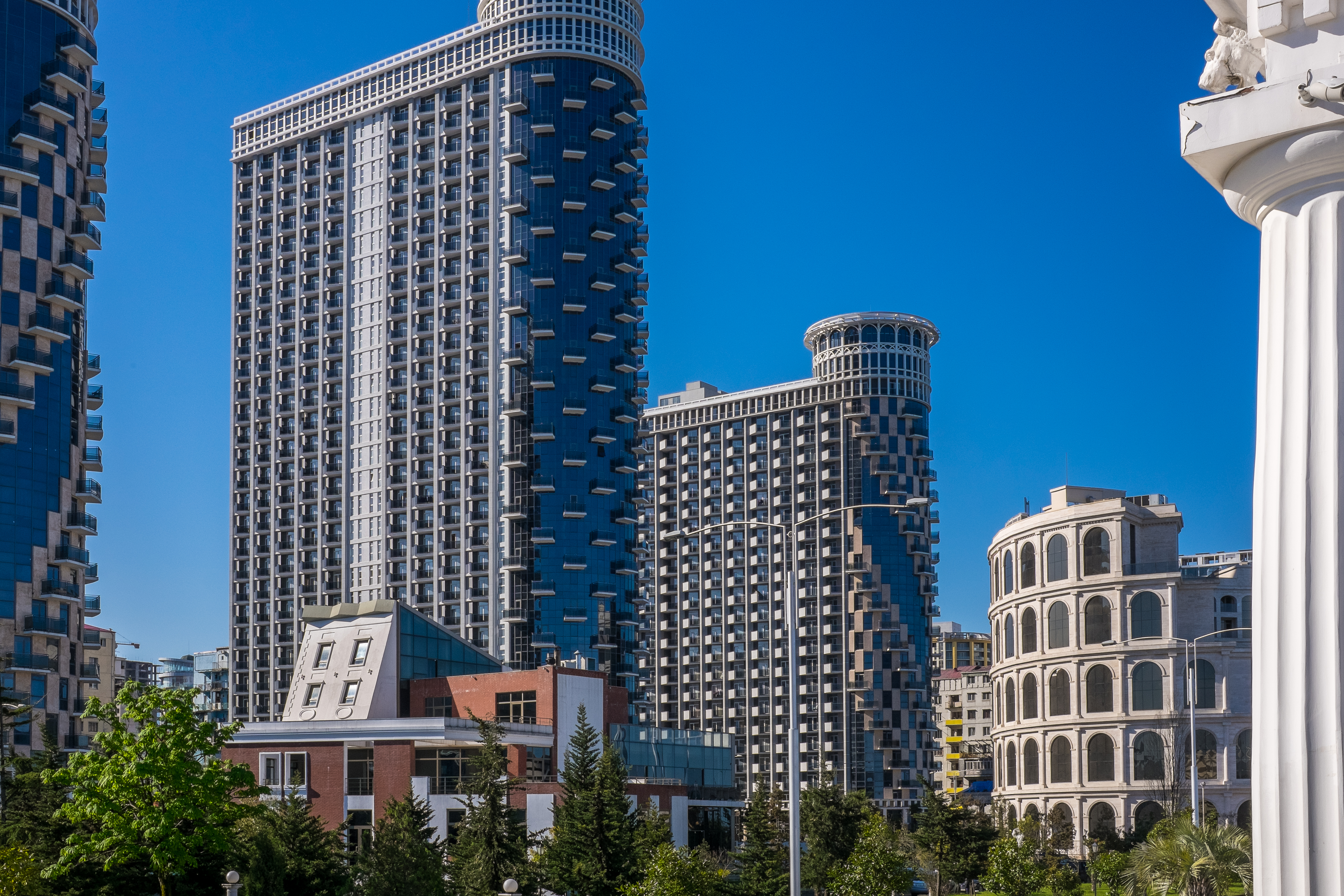
As Georgia's Black Sea coast continues to develop, high-rises are being built amongst Batumi's traditionally classical cityscapes.

Since the change of power in Adjara, Batumi has attracted international investors, and the prices of real estate in the city have trebled since 2001. In July 2007, the seat of the Constitutional Court of Georgia was moved from Tbilisi to Batumi to stimulate regional development. Several new hotels opened after 2009, first the Sheraton in 2010 and the Radisson Blu in 2011. The city features several casinos that attract tourists from Turkey, where gambling is illegal.

Batumi was host to the Russian 12th Military Base. Following the Rose Revolution, the central government pushed for the removal of these forces and reached an agreement in 2005 with Moscow. According to the agreement, the process of withdrawal was planned to be completed in 2008, but the Russians completed the transfer of the Batumi base to Georgia on 13 November 2007, ahead of schedule.

== Geography ==
=== Climate ===
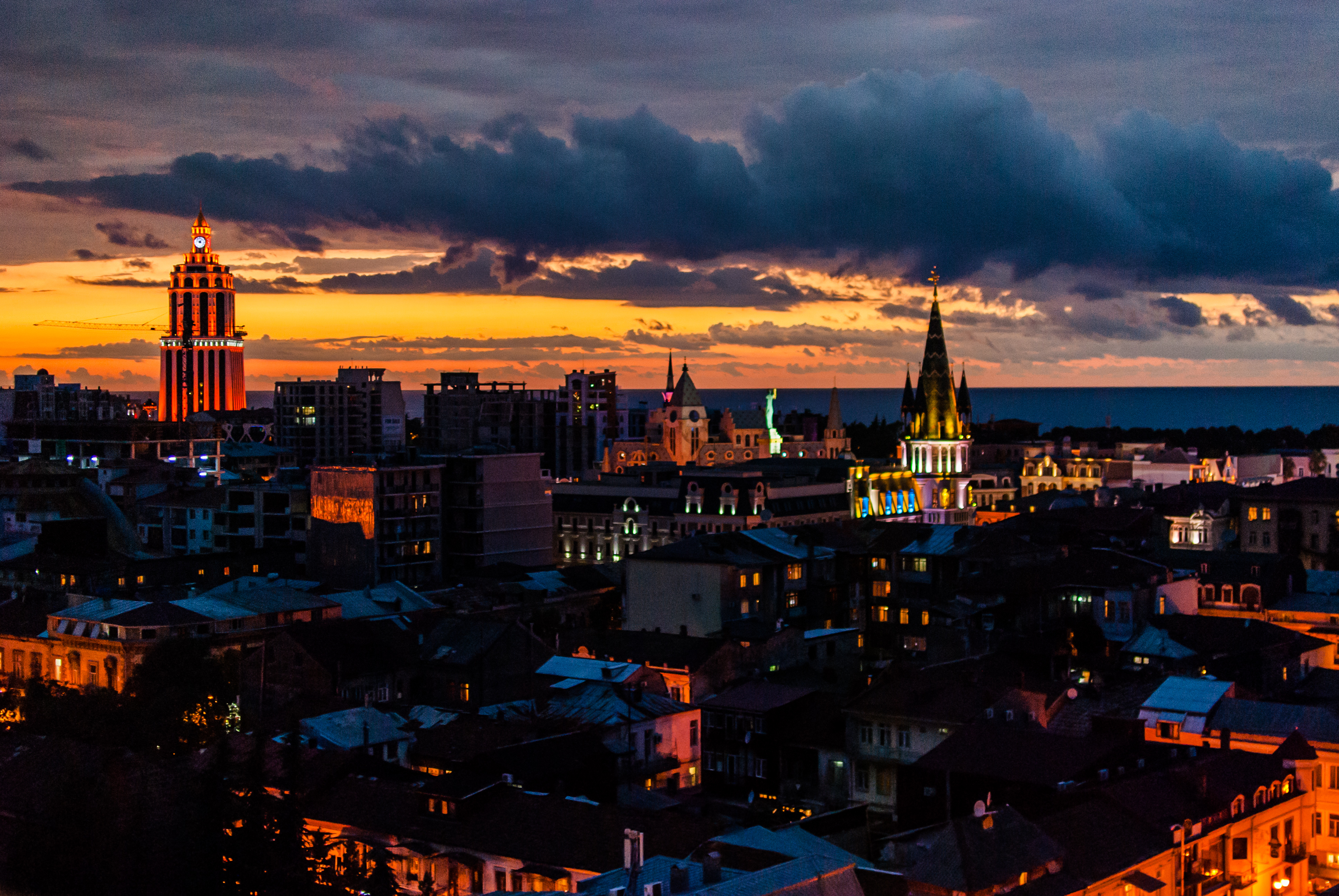
Batumi at night

Batumi has a humid subtropical climate (Cfa) according to Köppen's classification. The city's climate is heavily influenced by the onshore flow from the Black Sea and is subject to the orographic effect of the nearby hills and mountains, resulting in significant rainfall throughout most of the year, making Batumi the wettest city in both Georgia and the entire Caucasus Region.

The average annual temperature in Batumi is approximately 14 °C (57 °F). January is the coldest month with an average temperature of 5 °C (41 °F). August is the hottest month, with an average temperature of 22 °C (72 °F). The absolute minimum recorded temperature is −6 °C (21 °F), and the absolute maximum is 40 °C (104 °F). The number of days with daily temperatures above 10 °C (50 °F) is 239. The city receives 1958 hours of sunshine per year.

Batumi's average annual precipitation is 2,435 mm (95.9 in). November is the wettest month with an average of 312 mm (12.3 in) of precipitation, while May is the driest, averaging 84 mm (3.3 in). Batumi receives snow most years, but it is often limited in amount (accumulating snowfall of more than 30 cm (11.8 in) is rare), and the number of days with snow cover for the year is 12. The average level of relative humidity ranges from 70 to 80%.

Climate data for Batumi Airport (normals for 1981-2010)
Month	Jan	Feb	Mar	Apr	May	Jun	Jul	Aug	Sep	Oct	Nov	Dec	Year
Record high °C (°F)	25.3 (77.5)	27.4 (81.3)	33.0 (91.4)	38.3 (100.9)	37.2 (99.0)	39.9 (103.8)	40.8 (105.4)	39.5 (103.1)	38.1 (100.6)	35.4 (95.7)	30.1 (86.2)	28.3 (82.9)	40.8 (105.4)
Mean daily maximum °C (°F)	6.6 (43.9)	7.6 (45.7)	12.3 (54.1)	18.6 (65.5)	22.8 (73.0)	27.7 (81.9)	31.1 (88.0)	30.9 (87.6)	26.1 (79.0)	19.4 (66.9)	12.4 (54.3)	7.6 (45.7)	18.6 (65.5)
Daily mean °C (°F)	5.4 (41.7)	6.8 (44.2)	8.7 (47.7)	12.4 (54.3)	16.0 (60.8)	20.2 (68.4)	22.6 (72.7)	23.2 (73.8)	20.1 (68.2)	16.5 (61.7)	12.0 (53.6)	6.8 (44.2)	14.2 (57.6)
Mean daily minimum °C (°F)	4.3 (39.7)	4.0 (39.2)	5.5 (41.9)	9.1 (48.4)	12.9 (55.2)	17.0 (62.6)	19.9 (67.8)	20.3 (68.5)	17.1 (62.8)	13.5 (56.3)	9.2 (48.6)	6.1 (43.0)	11.6 (52.8)
Record low °C (°F)	−7.7 (18.1)	−8.2 (17.2)	−6.7 (19.9)	−2.5 (27.5)	3.4 (38.1)	8.1 (46.6)	12.9 (55.2)	12.6 (54.7)	7.5 (45.5)	2.0 (35.6)	−3.9 (25.0)	−4.2 (24.4)	−8.2 (17.2)
Average precipitation mm (inches)	234.7 (9.24)	183.4 (7.22)	156.6 (6.17)	90.1 (3.55)	92.5 (3.64)	141.0 (5.55)	164.9 (6.49)	220.7 (8.69)	330.1 (13.00)	321.5 (12.66)	305.5 (12.03)	277.7 (10.93)	2,519 (99.17)
Average precipitation days (≥ 1 mm)	14	12.7	12.6	9.6	9.6	9.9	10.1	11.5	11.1	12.4	12.2	13.1	138.8
Mean monthly sunshine hours	99	105	126	148	199	235	214	223	201	176	125	107	1,958
Source 1: NCEI
Source 2:

=== Subdivisions ===
According to the 31 March 2008, decision of the Batumi City Council, Batumi is divided into thirteen boroughs, those of:

- Old Batumi (ძველი ბათუმის უბანი)
- Rustaveli (რუსთაველის უბანი)
- Khimshiashvili (ხიმშიაშვილის უბანი)
- Bagrationi (ბაგრატიონის უბანი)
- Aghmashenebeli (აღმაშენებლის უბანი)
- Javakhishvili (ჯავახიშვილის უბანი)
- Tamar (თამარის უბანი)
- Boni-Gorodok (ბონი-გოროდოკის უბანი)
- Airport (აეროპორტის უბანი)
- Gonio-Kvariati (გონიო-კვარიათის უბანი)
- Kakhaberi (კახაბრის უბანი)
- Batumi Industrial (ბათუმის სამრეწველო უბანი)
- Green Cape (მწვანე კონცხის უბანი)

=== Cityscape ===
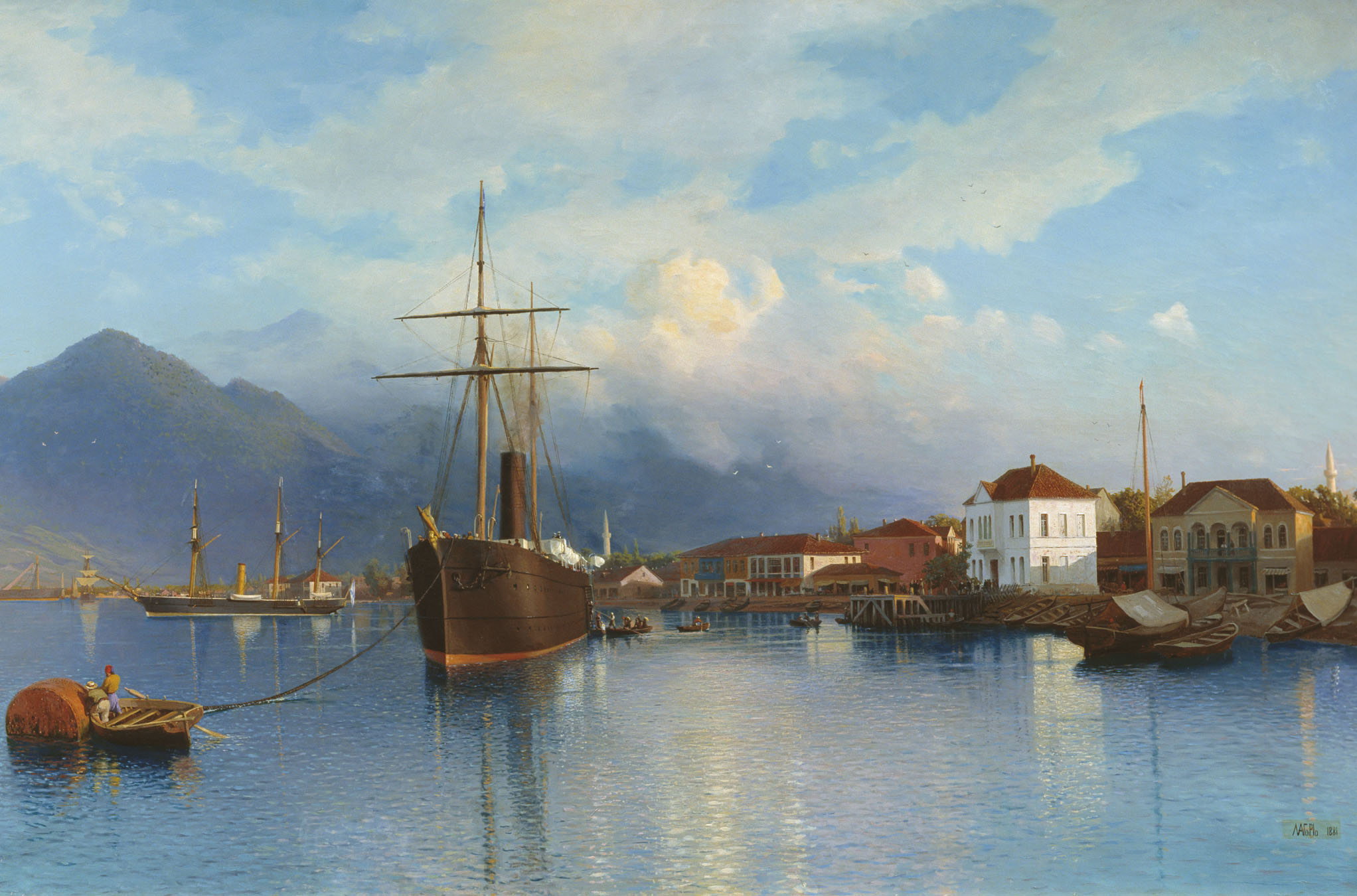
Port of Batumi in 1881

==== Contemporary architecture ====
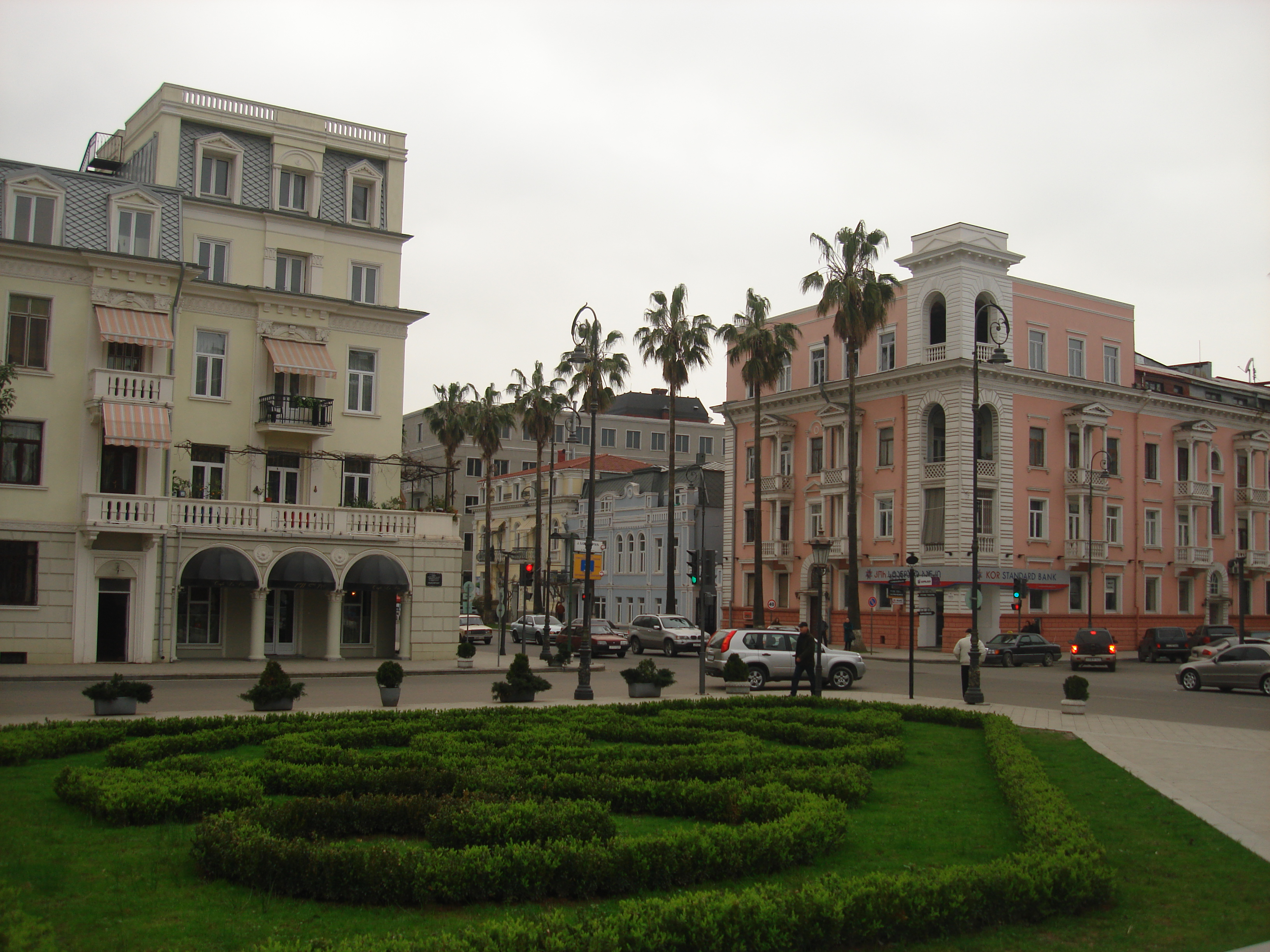
Batumi Neptun Square

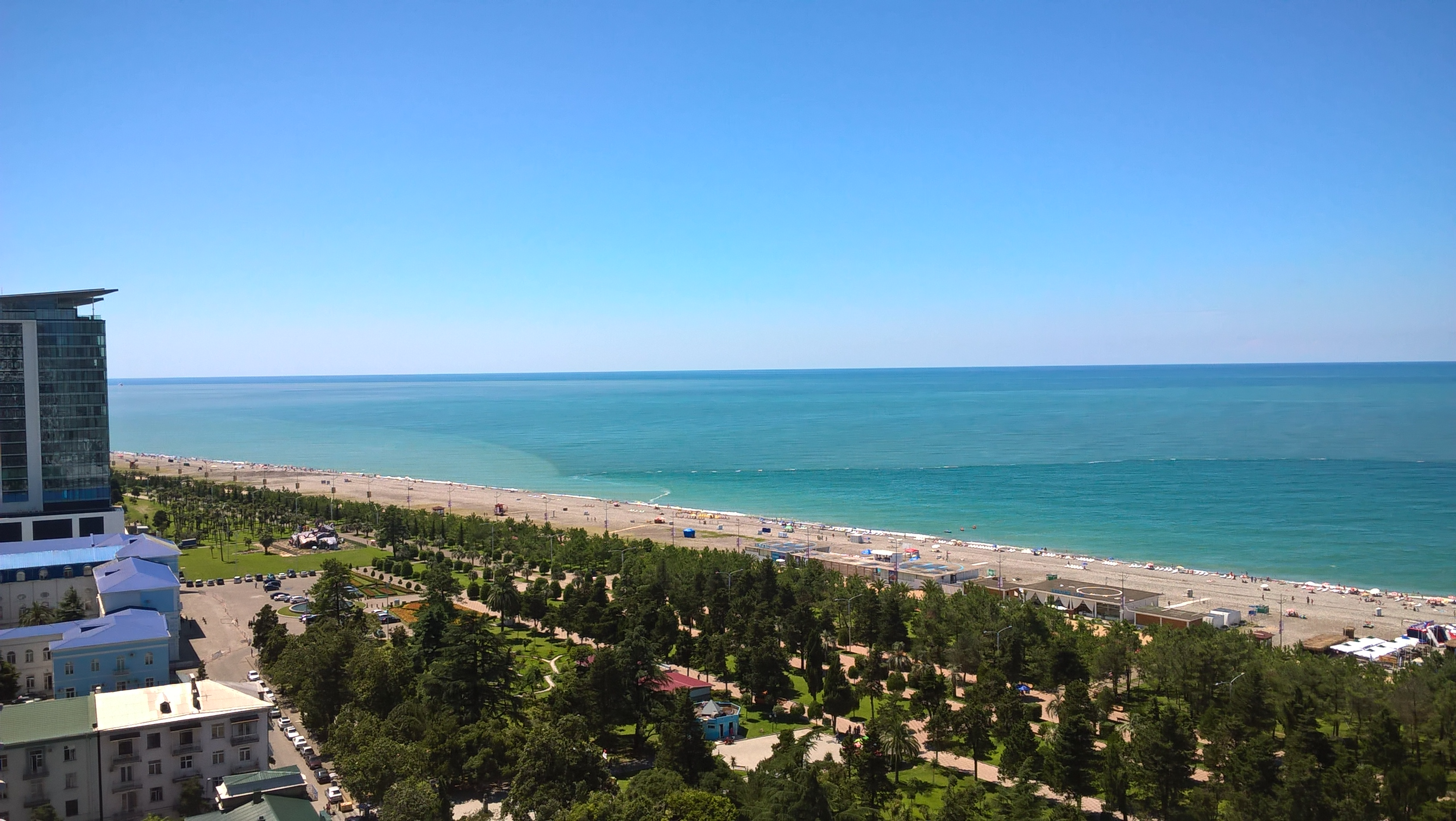
Batumi boulevard and beach

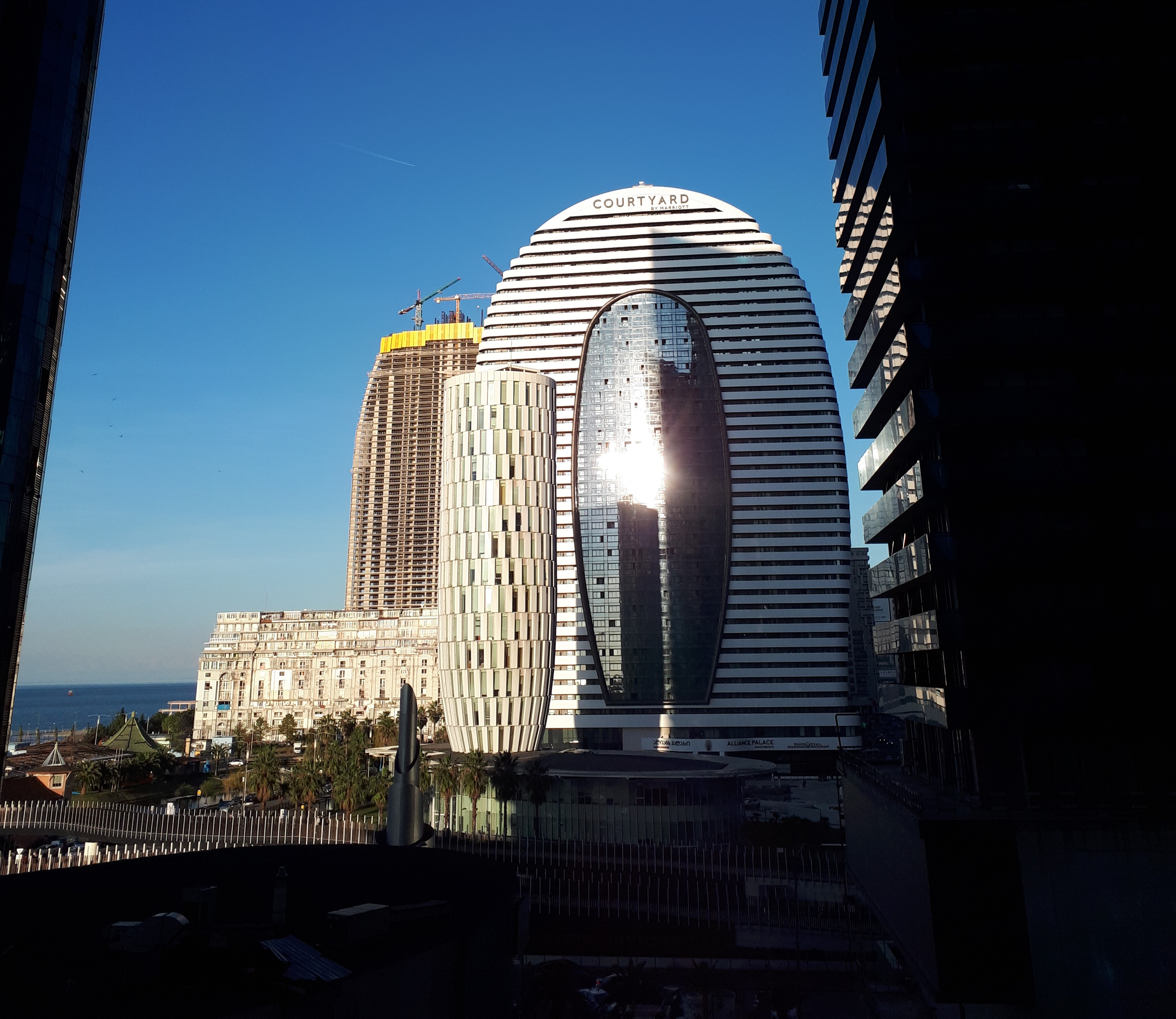
Marriott Hotel, Batumi

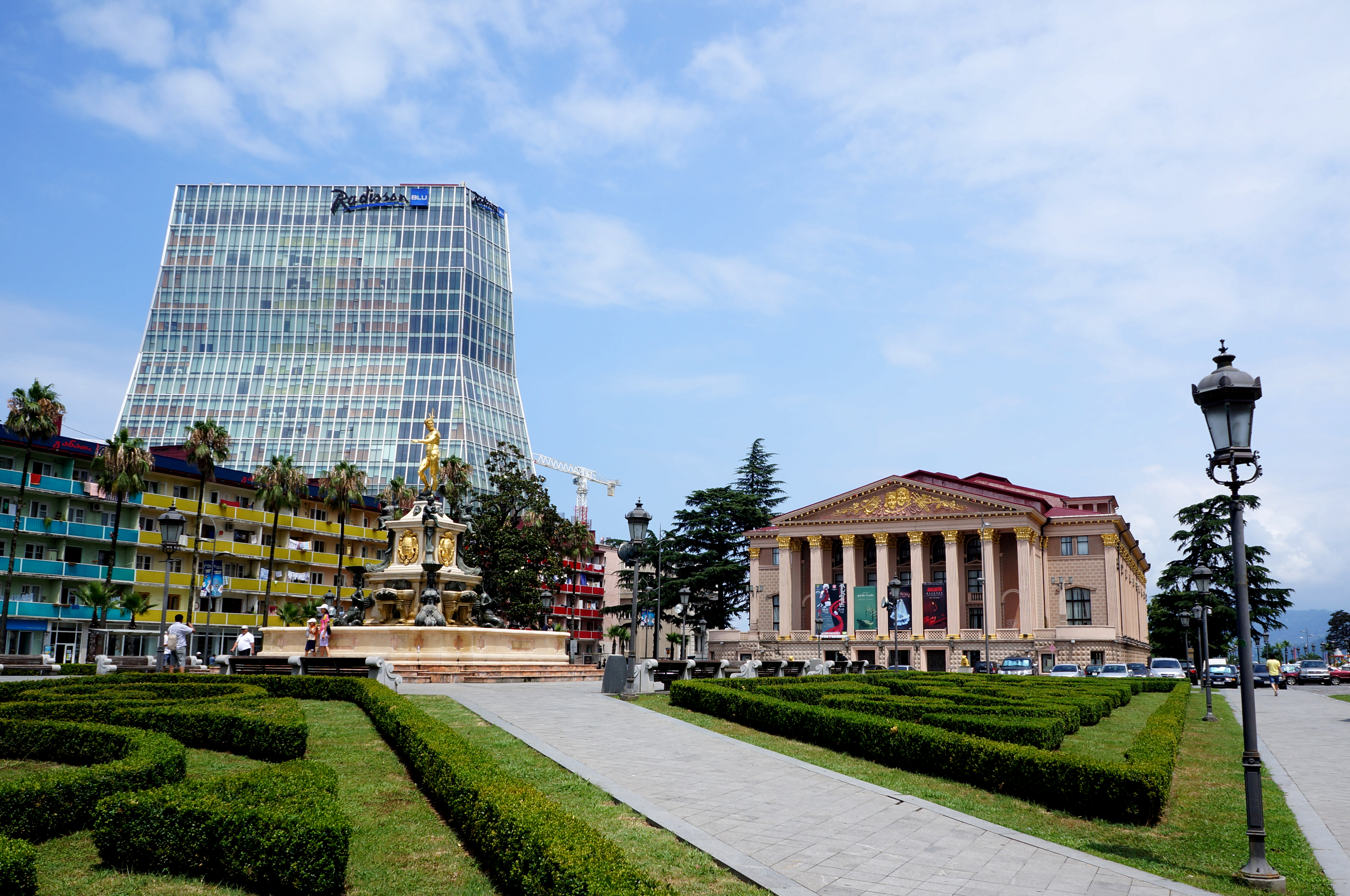
Radisson Blu Hotel, Batumi

Batumi's skyline has been transformed since 2007 with remarkable buildings and monuments of contemporary architecture, including:

- Marriott Hotel
- Radisson Blu hotel
- Public Service Hall
- Hilton Batumi
- Leogrand

A large Kempinski hotel and casino is to open in 2013, a Hilton Hotel as well as a 47-storey Trump Tower is also planned. Alliance Privilege, a building compromising Marriott Hotel, Casino and serviced apartments is one of the contemporary buildings with unique architecture by the beach.

==== Novelty architecture ====
Novelty architecture in Batumi includes:

- Sheraton Hotel, designed in the style of the Great Lighthouse at Alexandria, Egypt
- Alphabetic Tower (145 m, 476 ft high), celebrating Georgian script and writing
- Batumi Piazza, a mixed-used development in the form of an Italian piazza
- Buildings designed in the style of a lighthouse, the Acropolis, and an upside-down White House

=== Sites of interest ===
==== Main sights ====
Attractions include

- Adjara State Museum
- Batumi Botanical Garden
- Circus
- Former resort area along the Black Sea coast.

==== Tourist attractions ====
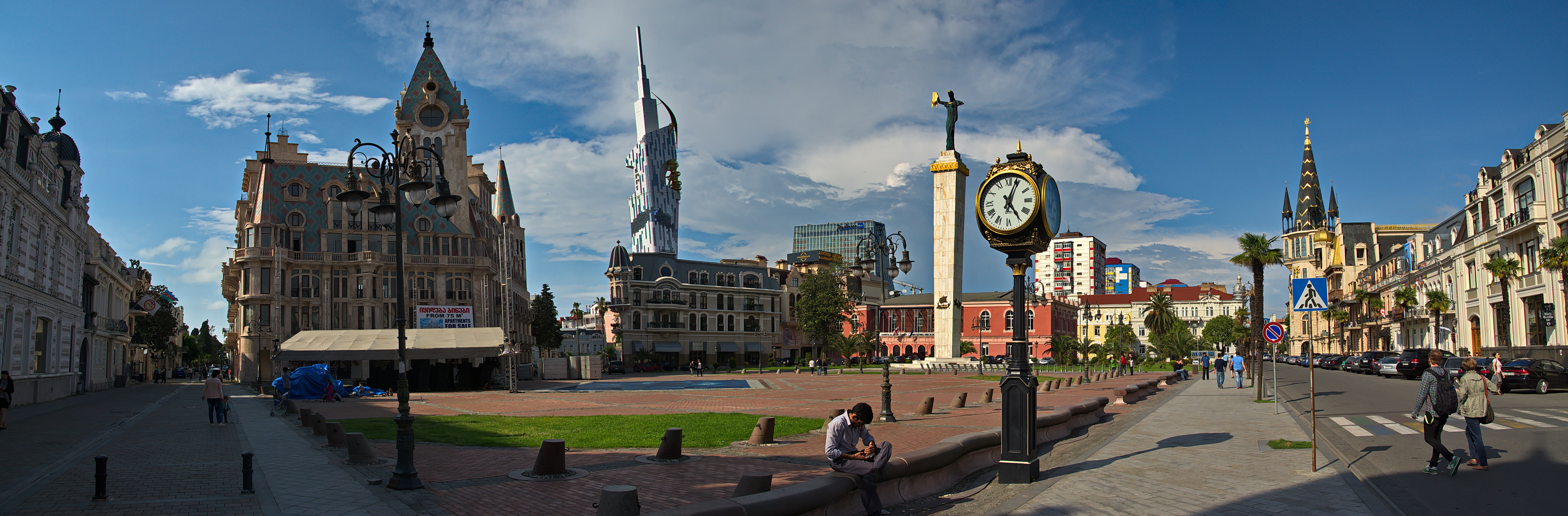
Panorama view of Batumi Europe Square and Medea Statue

- Batumi Boulevard
- The statue of "Man and Woman" AKA "Ali and Nino" by Georgian artist, Tamara Kvesitadze
- Batumi Botanical Gardens
- Cafe Fantasy
- Dancing Fountains, Batumi
- Dolphinarium
- Piazza Square
- Panoramic Wheel
- Astronomical clock
- Argo Cable Car
- 6 May Park
- Europe Square
- Alphabetic Tower
- Batumi Sea Port
- Miracle Park
- Chacha Clock Tower (defunct)
- Fountain of Neptun
- Batumi Archeological Museum
- Monument of Ilia Chavchavadze

== Demographics ==
Georgian Orthodox Cathedral of the Mother of God

Historical population and ethnic composition of Batumi
Year	Georgians		Armenians		Russians		Greeks		Others		Total
1886	2,518	17%	3,458	23.4%	2,982	20.1%	1,660	11.2%	4,185	28.3%	14,803
1897	6,087	21.4%	6,839	24%	6,224	21.8%	2,764	9.7%	6,594	23.1%	28,508
1916	6,481	32.4%	5,524	27.6%	4,825	24.1%			3,190	15.9%	20,020
1926	17,804	36.7%	10,233	21.1%	8,760	18.1%	2,844	5.9%	8,833	18.2%	48,474
1959	40,181	48.8%	12,743	15.5%	20,857	25.3%	1,668	2%	6,879	8.4%	82,328
2002	104,313	85.6%	7,517	6.2%	6,300	5.2%	587	0.5%	3,089	2.5%	121,806
2014	142,691	93.4%	4,636	3.0%	2,889	1.9%	289	0.2%	2,334	1.5%	152,839

=== Religion ===
Of the 4,970 inhabitants in 1872, about 4,500 were Muslim (Adjarians, Turks, Circassians, and Abkhazians). In the 1897 census, the Orthodox Christian population was 15,495 (mostly Slavs) while Muslims numbered 3,156, including some of whom were citizens of Turkey.

As of 2014, out of 152,839 inhabitants of Batumi, 68,7% is Eastern Orthodox Christian, and they primarily adhere to the national Georgian Orthodox Church. Muslims make up 25,3% of population, while there are also Catholic, Armenian Apostolic, Jehovah's Witness, Seventh-day Adventist, and Jewish communities.

The main places of worship in the city are:

- Georgian Orthodox Cathedral of the Mother of God, and Saint Barbara Church
- Catholic Church of the Holy Spirit
- Saint Nicholas Church
- Batumi Mosque
- Batumi Synagogue

== Culture ==
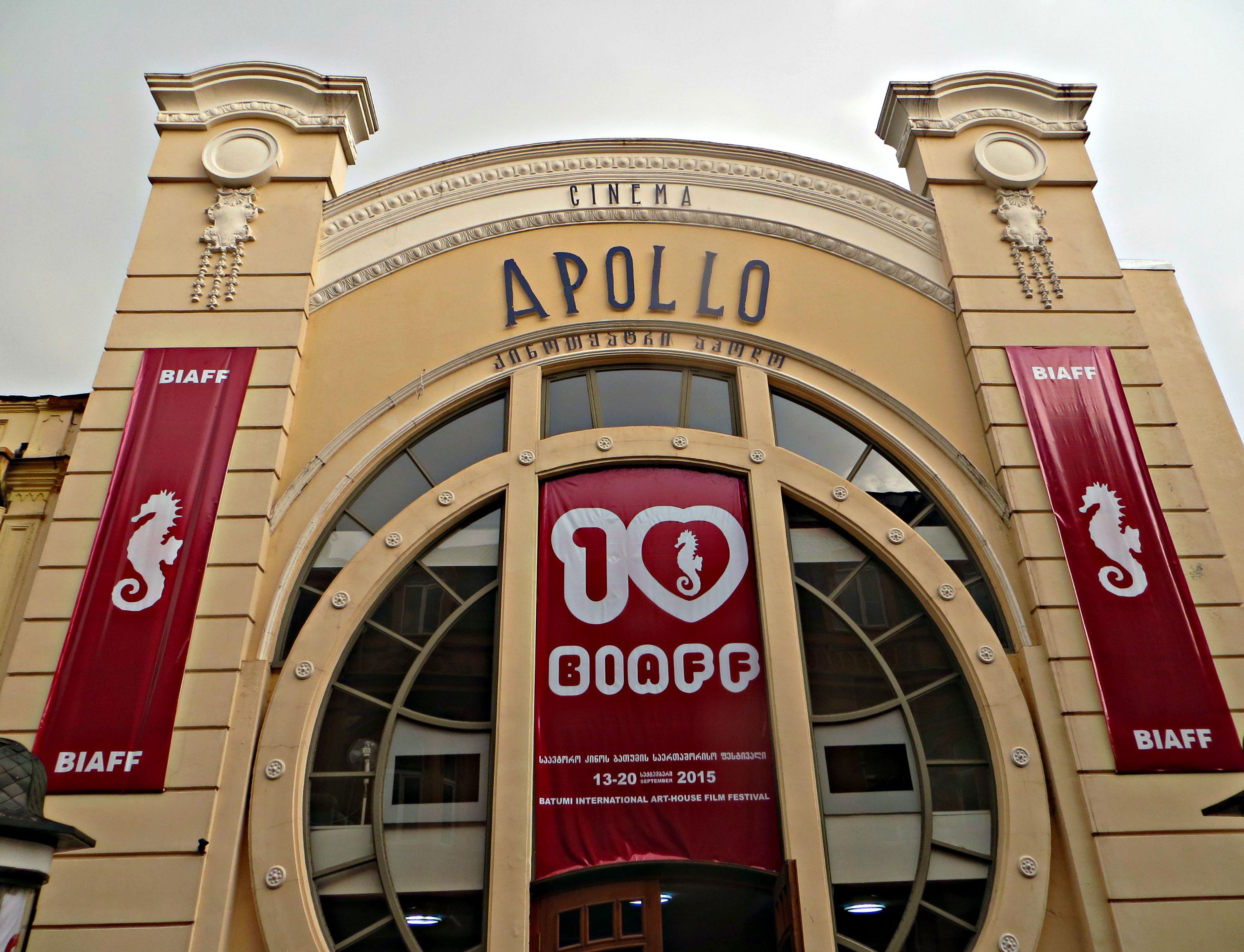
Apollo Cinema

Batumi has 18 various museums, including State Art Museum of Adjara. Rugby Union club Batumi RC competes in the Georgian Didi 10 and previously competed in the Pan-European Rugby Europe Super Cup. Football club FC Dinamo Batumi play at the Batumi stadium.

A sculpture by Tamara Kvesitadze of two standing figures on the seashore shows the story first told in the 1937 Austrian novel, Ali and Nino, of lovers who are parted after World War I. Each day, the two figures move toward each other but never stay together. Ali, an Azerbaijani Muslim, falls in love with Georgian princess, Nino, but sadly, after they are finally able to get together, the war hits home and Ali is killed. It was installed in 2010.

== Notable people ==
Notable people who are from or have resided in Batumi:

- Irakli Alasania (*1973), Georgian politician, Minister of Defense
- Herbert Backe (1896–1947), Reich Minister of Food in Nazi Germany
- Ioseb Bardanashvili (*1948), composer
- Khatia Buniatishvili (*1987), concert pianist
- Odysseas Dimitriadis (1908–2005), Greek-Soviet music conductor
- Roman Dolidze (*1988), mixed martial artist
- Mary, Princess Eristavi (1888–1986), Georgian princess and model
- Fadiko Gogitidze (1916-1940), Adjara's first woman pilot
- Victor Asrielevich Grossman, (1887–1978), writer
- Devi Khajishvili (*1991), actor
- Sopho Khalvashi (*1986), first Georgian entrant to the Eurovision Song Contest 2007
- Mindia Khitarishvili (*1973), composer
- Konstantin Meladze (*1963), composer and producer
- Valery Meladze (*1965), singer
- Katie Melua, singer
- Aramashot Papayan, Armenian playwright, screenwriter, actor and director
- Lado Seidishvili (1931–2010), Georgian painter and poet
- Arkady and Boris Strugatsky (1925–1991; 1933–2012), science fiction authors
- William Horwood Stuart (1857–1906), British diplomat who was murdered there in 1906
- Sergei Yesenin (1895–1925), Russian lyrical poet
- Fyodor Yurchikhin (*1959), astronaut
- Lamara Chkonia (1930–2024), Georgian soprano

== Economy and infrastructure ==
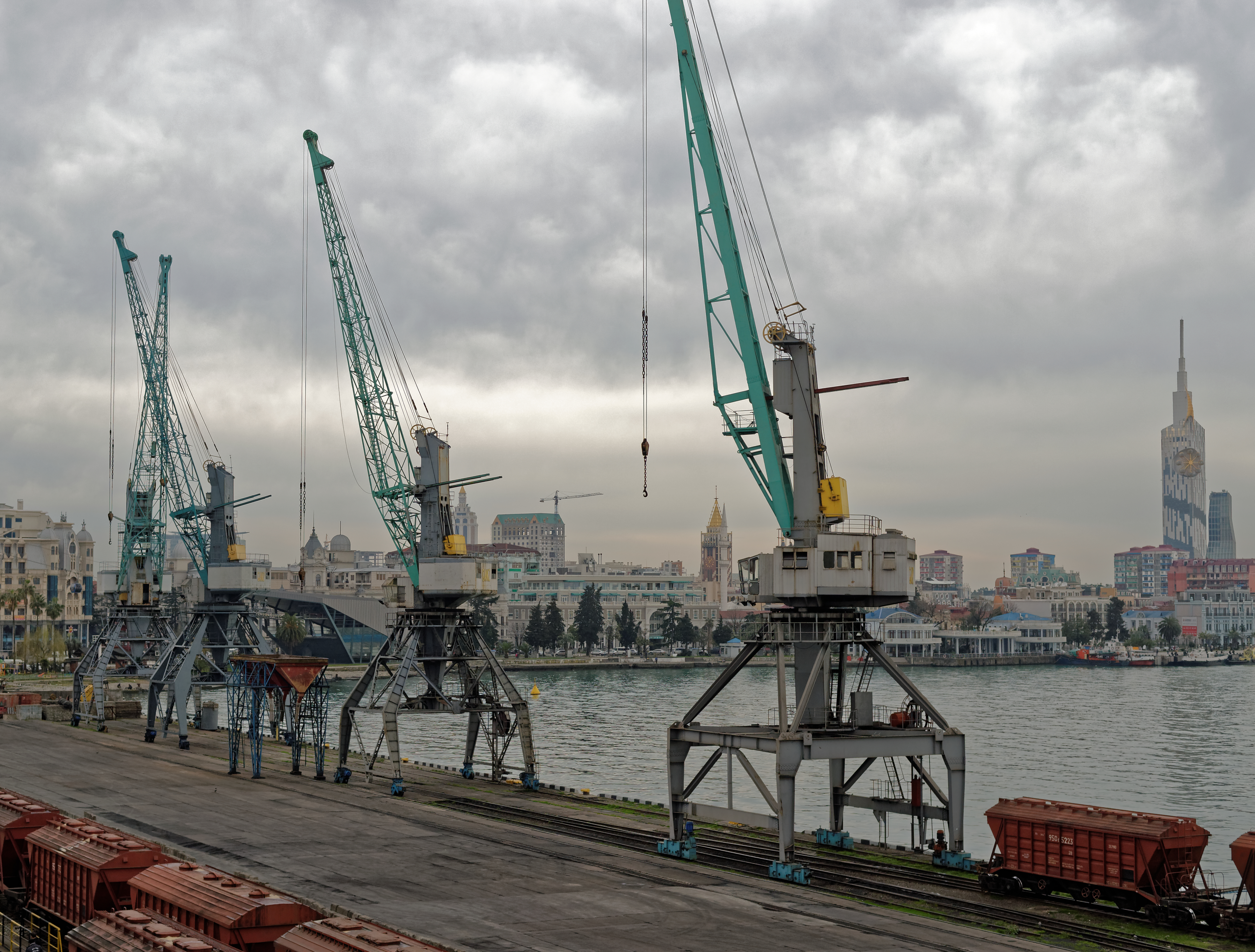
The seaport of Batumi with the city in the background.

=== Transport ===
The city is served by Batumi Airport, one of three international airports in the country.

The main types of public transport are buses, minibusses, and taxis. Batumi has modern electric buses. Using the service is possible by BATUMICARD, transit card, or debit/credit cards. Buses connect almost everywhere in the city. A bike-sharing system named BatumVelo allows you to rent a bicycle on the street with a smart card.

The port of Batumi is on one of the routes of China's proposed Eurasian Land Bridge (part of the "New Silk Road"), which would see an eastern freight link to China via Azerbaijan and the Caspian Sea, and a western link by ferry to Ukraine and on to Europe.

=== Education ===
University of Batumi

Batumi has become an emerging centre for medical education in the Caucasus region, attracting international students due to its affordable tuition and English-language programs. Institutions such as Batumi Shota Rustaveli State University, BAU International University offer accredited medical degrees recognized across America, Europe and Asia.

The city's growth in medical education is supported by modern infrastructure and increasing foreign enrollment. According to The Times of India, many Indian students choose Batumi for MBBS studies due to simplified admission processes and NMC-recognized curriculum.

== Twin towns – sister cities ==
Batumi is twinned with:

- Bari, Italy (1987)
- Savannah, United States (1992)
- Trabzon, Turkey (2000)
- Vanadzor, Armenia (2006)
- Volos, Greece (2007)
- Yalta, Ukraine (2008)
- Burgas, Bulgaria (2009)
- Marbella, Spain (2010)
- Kuşadası, Turkey (2010)
- Ordu, Turkey (2011)
- Ternopil, Ukraine (2011)
- Ashdod, Israel (2011)
- New Orleans, United States (2012)
- Yalova, Turkey (2012)
- Nakhchivan, Azerbaijan (2012)
- Daugavpils, Latvia (2012)
- Donetsk, Ukraine (2013)
- Prague 1, Czech Republic (2013)
- Sharm El Sheikh, Egypt (2014)
- Ürümqi, China (2015)
- Brest, Belarus (2015)
- Paphos, Cyprus (2016)
- Nysa, Poland (2017)
- Mogilev, Belarus (2017)
- Netanya, Israel (2018)
- Wrocław, Poland (2019)
- Constanța, Romania (2020)
