= Tallinn TV Tower =

Television tower in Tallinn, Estonia

Tallinn TV tower
- Tallinn TV tower
- Interactive map of the Tallinn TV tower area

General information
- Type: observation, telecommunications
- Location: Tallinn, Estonia
- Coordinates: 59°28′16.34″N 24°53′15″E
- Construction started: 1975
- Completed: 1980
- Owner: Levira

Height
- Antenna spire: 314 m (1,030.2 ft)

Technical details
- Lifts/elevators: 2

Design and construction
- Architects: David Baziladze and Juri Sinis

Tallinn TV Tower (Estonian: Tallinna teletorn) is a free-standing structure with an observation deck, built to provide better telecommunication services for the 1980 Moscow Summer Olympics regatta event (see Sailing at the 1980 Summer Olympics). It is located near the suburb Pirita, six km north-east of the Tallinn city center. With its 313 m (1030.2 ft), the TV tower is the tallest nonbuilding structure in Tallinn. The tower was officially opened on 11 July 1980. The viewing platform at a height of 170 metres was open to the public until 26 November 2007, when it was closed for renovation. The tower began receiving visitors again on 5 April 2012. The building is administered by the public company Levira (formerly Estonian Broadcasting Transmission Center Ltd) and is a member of the World Federation of Great Towers.

The architects were David Baziladze and Juri Sinis, the engineers Vladimir Obydov and Yevgeny Ignatov. The construction work was supervised by Aleksander Ehala. The stained glass window art was created by Dolores Hoffmann.

The cornerstone was laid on 30 September 1975, and the building was inaugurated 11 July 1980 (although the first transmission took place in 1979). The tower body was constructed of reinforced concrete rings 50 cm thick that weigh a total of 17,000 tonnes, and the total tower weight is approximately 20,000 tonnes. The tower survived a fire during construction.

The observation deck on the 21st floor, originally designed to have a rotating section, is located 170 m above ground and has a diameter of 38 m. The tower was closed to the public on 26 November 2007. Before it was closed, tickets were priced at 60 Estonian kroon and, aside from an infrequently used concrete and metal staircase, the observation deck was accessed by two elevators. The Vilnius TV tower has a similar architectural design but features a rotating observation deck 165 m above ground.

The structure consists of a 190-metre reinforced concrete tower and a 124-metre metal mast on top of it. Under the tower is a two-storey building with equipment rooms, entrance halls and a conference centre. The diameter of the tower at its base is 15.2 metres and the wall thickness is 50 cm. The diameter of the tower from 140 metres up is 8.2 metres. A total of 10,000 m^{3} of concrete and 1,900 tonnes of steel were used in the construction.

The Tallinn TV tower was reopened on 5 April 2012 with completely new interior design made by KOKO Arhitektid. Hoffmann's stained glass windows were restored and moved to the south side of the TV tower.

Local guide books advertise the observation deck's views of Tallinn and extending to the Gulf of Finland. The tower is described as having a 1980s Soviet feel and a restaurant is located on the observation floor. Bullet holes dating from the Soviet coup attempt of 1991 are still visible at the base of the tower.

== 1991 defense of Estonia ==
A widely known account tells of a handful of radio operators who in 1991 risked their lives to protect the free media of the reborn Republic of Estonia from Soviet troops. The defenders placed a matchbox between the elevator door and frame in such a manner that the elevator wouldn't work, leaving the approximately 1,000 tower steps as the only route to the top for the Soviets. The operators also had an oxygen-removing fire-fighting system at their disposal. Triggering the system would have asphyxiated everyone in the tower, including the defenders themselves. However, it is not known if the system was operational or if the threat to deploy it was a bluff. The story is well known in Estonia; it is also part of the movie August 1991 and is mentioned at length in the documentary The Singing Revolution.

== Tallinn TV tower's structural features ==
Thirty-two building enterprises participated in the construction of the Tallinn TV tower. The TV tower was designed by specialists at the State Design Institute of the Ministry of Communications in Moscow. The chief engineer was Yevgeny Ignatov, the chief designer was Vladimir Obydov and the architects were Juri Sinis and David Basiladze.

The team faced two challenges: to choose a suitable tower structure and select the best location for it. The structure selected was a freely supported base part from reinforced concrete and steel upper part serving as the antenna, with a total height of 314 metres. The internal space of such a TV tower made from reinforced concrete is sufficient for installation of all the necessary equipment and addition of a viewing platform with a restaurant, accessed via a high-speed lift. The height of the tower is such that it is capable of transmitting excellent radio and television signals to distances of up to 90 kilometres in ideal weather conditions.

Several factors were taken into account for the location: the required distance from densely populated urban areas to ensure proper signal reception, geological features of the local soil, distance from the airport, and impact on Tallinn's skyline. The chosen spot was 8 kilometres from the city centre, in a rest and recreation zone not far from the botanical garden and a motor sports club. The location is 23 metres above sea level. The tower, clearly visible from the city and from the sea, dominates the surrounding landscape and affects the local architecture.

The structure of the tower can be divided into three sections: the foundation, the tower itself from reinforced concrete (190 m) and the steel antenna (124 m). From 150–182 metres the tower contains a superstructure that is 38 metres in diameter, housing the viewing platform, the restaurant and the equipment room for commercial radio stations. The two-storey building that surrounds the base of the tower is also 38 metres in diameter and contains technical and auxiliary facilities. The foundation slab made from reinforced concrete is 38 metres in diameter, 2.5 metres thick and buried 8.5 metres below ground level. This slab supports a tower of reinforced concrete that is 15.2 metres in diameter at the base and only 8.2 metres in diameter at a height of 180 metres. The wall thickness in the lower part is 500 mm and 350 mm in the upper part; this is to ensure tower stability even in strong storm conditions. Before 1967 all tall structures had been built in Estonia in compliance with the safety requirements applicable to structures situated in areas with the second wind strength level. After a storm in 1967, with the wind speed reaching 42 metres per second, the TV tower was designed in compliance with the fourth wind strength level requirements.

The mass total of the tower is over 20,000 tons. The centre of gravity of the structure is in the base of the tower, which is why it could not fall over even if the foundation slab were on the surface of the ground.

The general contractor was the Tallinn Construction Trust and the subcontractors were the Reinforced Concrete Construction Trust, the Metal Structures Trust and the Radio Construction Trust. The work was commissioned by the TV Tower Construction Directorate of the Ministry of Communications of the Estonian SSR, with Vootele Tõsine as its director.

== Construction work ==
Several new technical solutions were implemented during the construction of the TV tower. The reinforced concrete tower itself was assembled using the sliding mold method. The concrete mold was installed at a height of 2.5 metres; then the armature was inserted and the concrete poured. After that the concrete form was shifted upwards, narrowed to the new diameter and the new section of reinforced concrete created. Today the rings resulting from this process can still be seen at 2.5-metre intervals on the tower. The concrete was poured continuously for 8 months, with the tower gradually rising above the landscape. The builders used M-400 concrete based on oil shale ash and Portland cement. This concrete had been developed by the scientists at the Tallinn Polytechnical Institute under the supervision of Verner Kikas. The concrete was designed to withstand 300 frost resistance cycles. Subsequent inspections have revealed that the strength of this concrete is even higher than stipulated.

The antenna part of the structure is made from steel cylinders. The metal antenna was installed using the ejection method. At first a smaller-diameter cylinder was lifted to the necessary spot; then over it was placed a larger-diameter cylinder and the smaller cylinder was pushed up through it with blocks and winches. The assembly was completed by attaching to each cylinder the television and ultra short-wave transmitter vibrators. The upper metal framework, weighing over 120 tons, was assembled on the ground around the base of the tower and then raised to 170 metres. From start to finish all building work was supervised by foreman Aleksander Ehala and team master Väino Saar. They often had to solve complicated problems and the designers always agreed with their solutions.

The TV tower is regularly checked for geodetic compliance: foundation settling, vertical deviation, condition of reinforced concrete and metal components, and other parameters. The allowed sway of the top of the TV tower due to wind is 1.5 metres; of the viewing platform, 90 cm. Besides winds, the tower is affected by solar heating, resulting in the top “drawing” a peculiar curve.

The steel part, from 190 m to 260 m, has a lift for two persons and hatches for access to the external platforms for the purpose of inspection and repairs of the antenna equipment. In the tower below the antenna section there is also a staircase with 1,050 steps from the basement to a height of 190 metres.

== Important dates ==
- 30 September 1975 – laying of the cornerstone
- April 1976 – completion of the foundation installation work
- May 1977 – construction of the reinforced concrete tower, 17,500 tons of concrete poured and 330 km of armature inserted
- February 1978 – the lift shaft is made in the 52 reinforced concrete blocks of the tower
- April 1978 – assembly of the metal antenna part commences
- 13 June 1978 – the tower reaches the intended height of 314 metres
- 30 October 1978 – the frame of the upper structure is raised into place
- December 1978 – installation of 16 supports in the upper structure; the tower now looks exactly as designed
- 20 December 1979 – first transmission
- 11 July 1980 – opening
- November 2007 – the tower is closed to visitors as it lacks a sufficient number of evacuation routes and exits
- 4 April 2012 – the renovated tower welcomes new visitors

== Incidents at the TV tower ==
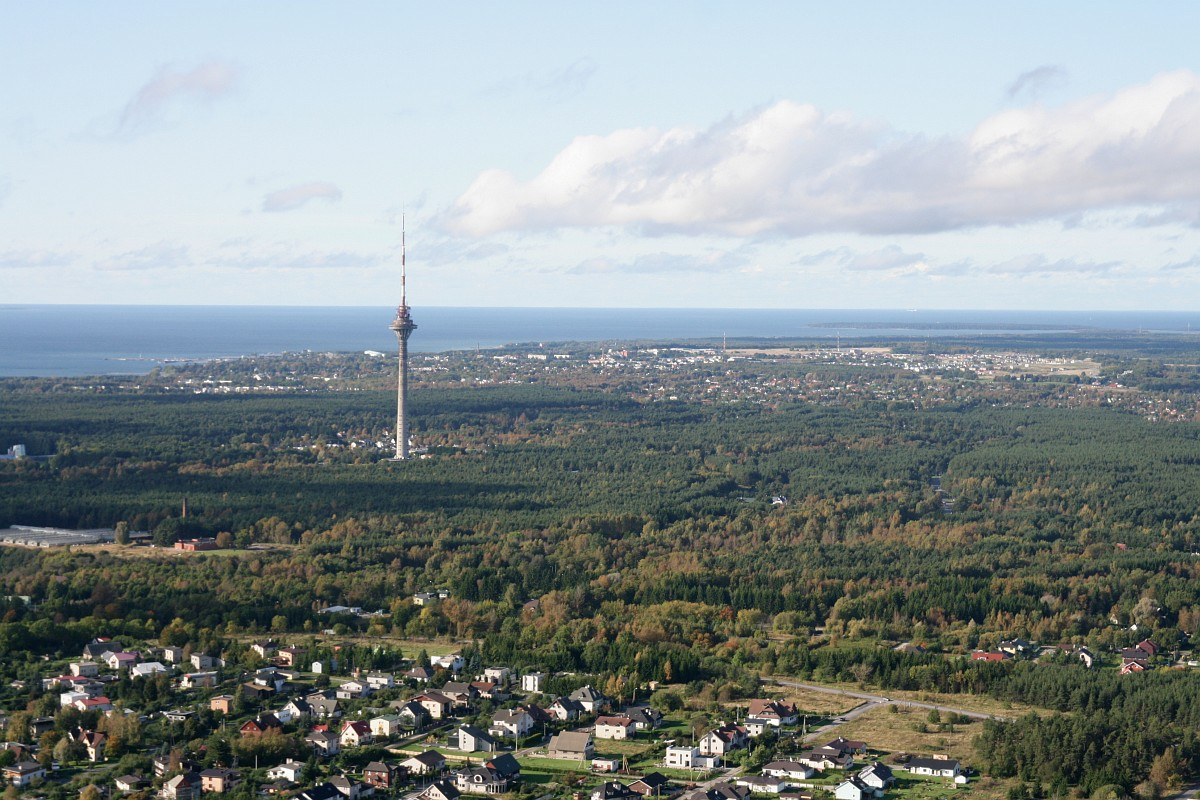
Remote view of Tallinn TV Tower

In April 1980 team master Saar prevented a major construction accident. A welder's negligence had caused the cables in the tower shaft to catch fire. The draught was strong because the structure acted like a giant chimney. The fire thus progressed quickly up the tower from the point of origin on the 5th storey. Saar managed to outrace the conflagration and cut the cables on the 23rd storey, thus preventing the fire from reaching the metal part of the tower. Had the antenna structure been subjected to heat from the fire, it might have collapsed. The fire damage was repaired within one month.

Over the decades the antenna equipment on the TV tower underwent a major overhaul. Due to the introduction of the FM waveband the radio antennas were rebuilt. But an accident ensued during installation of a 12-metre pipe-shaped antenna for the 45th television channel transmitter at the very tip of the tower. Jüri Makarov was a prominent local businessman who created a new television station, Tipp TV, and that included installation on the TV tower of an Italian-made transmitter for the channel. The corresponding antenna, a 12-metre pipe, had been purchased in the United States, and Makarov arranged to install it with the aid of a helicopter commissioned from St. Petersburg. The helicopter successfully removed an old radio antenna from the top of the tower. In the early morning on 19 May 1994 the helicopter took off with the new antenna. The helicopter, with the antenna suspended under it on a cable, attempted to manoeuvre to insert the end of the antenna into its slot. The wind was disruptive, its force reaching 8. When the antenna touched the tower, the pilots mistakenly assumed that it had gone into the slot and released the cable. The falling antenna hit the restaurant roof and grazed the railing. The roof of the viewing platform and its windows shattered. The antenna itself broke as well. A new antenna was later sent and specialists successfully installed it under the supervision of leading engineer Vitali Lonkin. Saar oversaw the repairs to the restaurant roof.

== Technical specifications ==
- Tower height: 314 m
- Viewing platform height: 170 m
- Height of base above sea level: 24 m
- Total weight: >25 000 t
- Viewing platform diameter: 38 m
- Foundation depth: 8.5 m
- Foundation slab thickness: 2.5 m
- Permitted deviation from wind at tower top: 1.5 m
- Permitted deviation from wind at viewing platform level: 90 cm
- The concrete section (from the basement up to the point at which the metal section begins) has 1,050 steps
- On the 13th-18th stories (they are 20 metres high) the tower only contains lift shafts and a fire escape staircase.

As of February 2010, the Tallinn TV tower transmits the following radio and TV stations:

Antenna
FM transmitters:

- Vikerraadio
- Raadio 2
- Raadio 4
- Klassikaraadio
- Raadio Tallinn
- Raadio 7
- Maania
- Energy
- Sky
- Sky+
- Russkoye Radio
- My Hits
- Dinamit FM
- Raadio 100
- U-Pop
- Kuku

TV transmitters:

- DTV (digital television)

GSM transceivers:

- Telia
- Elisa
- Tele2

== See also ==
- List of towers
