= State Art Museum of Adjara =

Museum in Batumi, Georgia

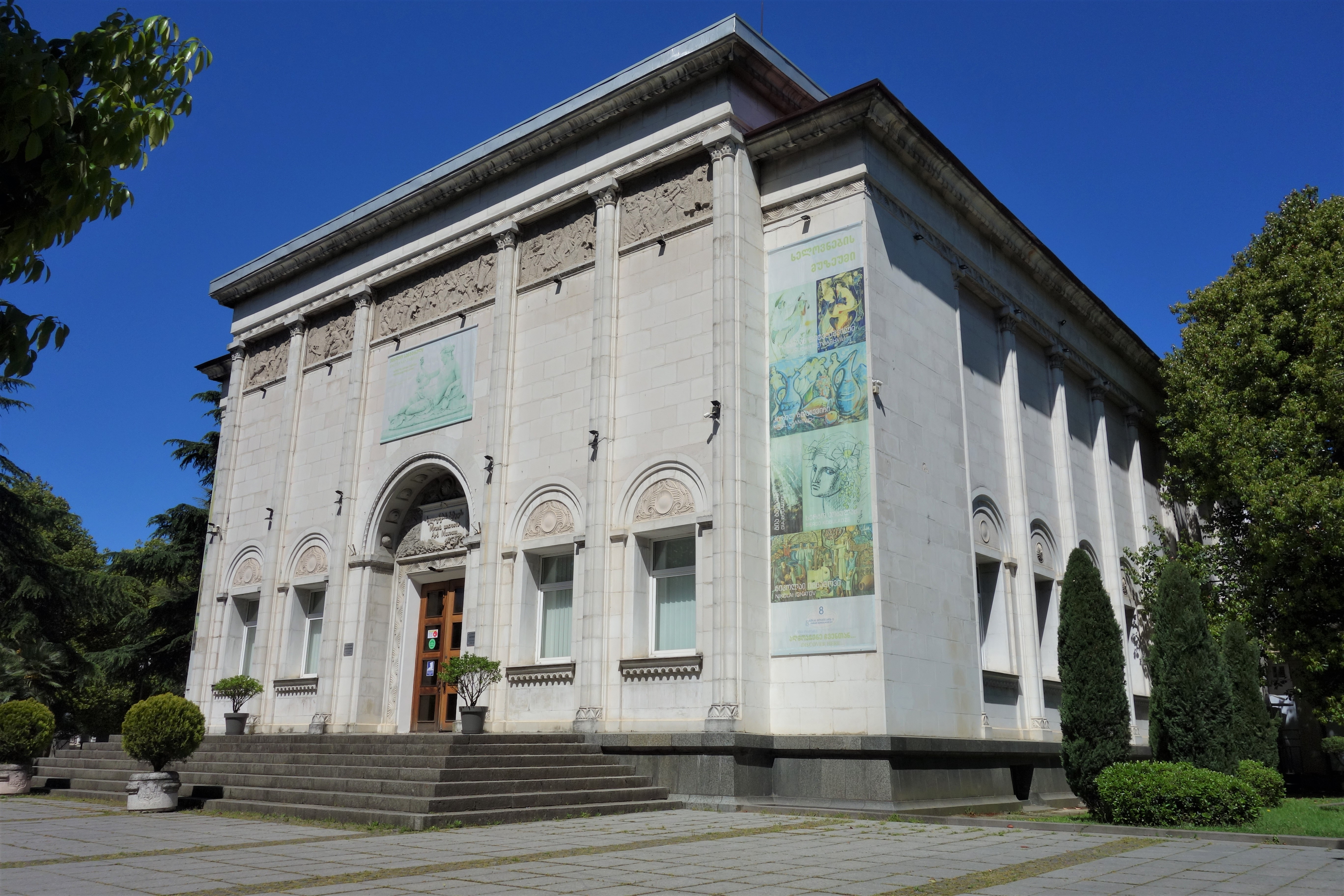
- Museum in Batumi, Georgia.
- Established: 1998
- Location: Batumi, Adjara, Georgia
- Coordinates: 41°38′54″N 41°38′1″E

State Art Museum of Adjara (Georgian: აჭარის ხელოვნების სახელმწიფო მუზეუმი) is a museum in the city of Batumi in Adjara, Georgia.

== Museum collection ==
The museum houses paintings of native Georgian as well as foreign artists. Museum collection has works of Niko Pirosmani, David Kakabadze, Lado Gudiashvili, Elene Akhvlediani, Stefan Bakałowicz, A. Zommer, Nikoloz (Koka) Ignatov, A. Zankovski and drawing made by N. Churgulia, Rusudan Petviashvili, L. Zambakhidze, G. Tsereteli etc. Sculptures are represented by E. Pantareli's “Nymph and a Little Faun”, Irakli Ochiauri’s “Portrait” and others. Decorative art collection has many works of ceramics, woodcuts, glasswork, engravings, tapestry.

== See also ==
- List of museums in Georgia (country)
