= Batumi Botanical Garden =

Batumi Botanical Garden ბათუმის ბოტანიკური ბაღი
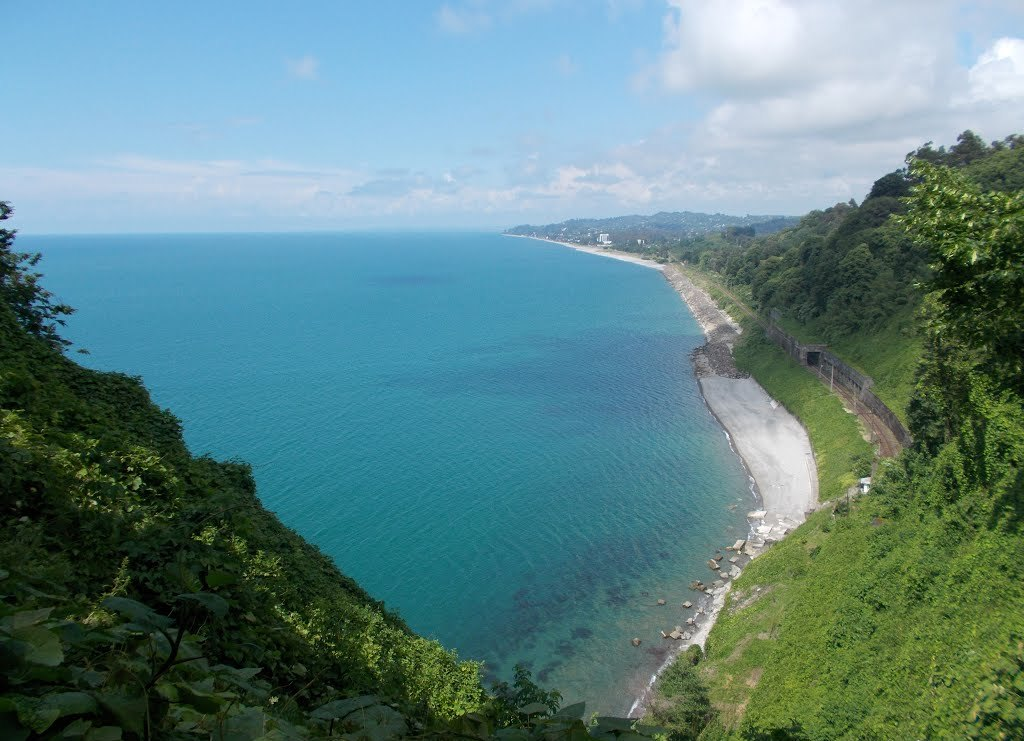
- View of seashore from Botanic Garden of Batumi

- Location of Batumi Botanical Garden Batumi Botanical Garden (Georgia) Batumi Botanical Garden (Caucasus Mountains)
- Coordinates: 41°38′45″N 41°38′30″E
- Country: Georgia
- Website: Official website

The Batumi Botanical Garden (Georgian: ბათუმის ბოტანიკური ბაღი) is a 108-hectare (270-acre) botanical garden located 9 km (5.6 mi) north of Batumi, the capital of the Autonomous Republic of Adjara, Georgia. Situated on the Black Sea coast at the area known as Mtsvane Kontskhi ("The Green Cape"), it is among the largest botanical gardens in the former Soviet Union and a major center for the study and conservation of subtropical flora. The garden contains thousands of plant species from diverse climatic and geographic zones, arranged into thematic collections, and serves as both a scientific research institution and a popular tourist attraction. It offers panoramic sea views, walking trails, and seasonal exhibitions, attracting visitors from Georgia and abroad throughout the year.

== Description ==
The Batumi Botanical Garden occupies a series of hills and ravines stretching along the coast of the Black Sea, offering a unique combination of subtropical vegetation and panoramic maritime views. Covering an area of approximately 108 hectares (270 acres), the garden is divided into nine distinct phytogeographic sections: the Caucasian humid subtropics, East Asia, New Zealand, South America, the Himalayas, Mexico, Australia, and the Mediterranean.

The living collections include more than 2,000 species and varieties of woody plants, of which over 100 are native to the Caucasus. Many of these are arranged to reflect their natural landscapes, creating an immersive experience where visitors can walk through dense bamboo groves, subtropical forests, and flowering Mediterranean shrublands.

In addition to its role as a scientific and conservation institution, the garden is a popular leisure destination, with well-marked walking trails, picnic areas, and seasonal exhibitions. Elevated viewpoints such as the Seaside Panorama and the Upper Park offer some of the most photographed vistas in the Adjara region.

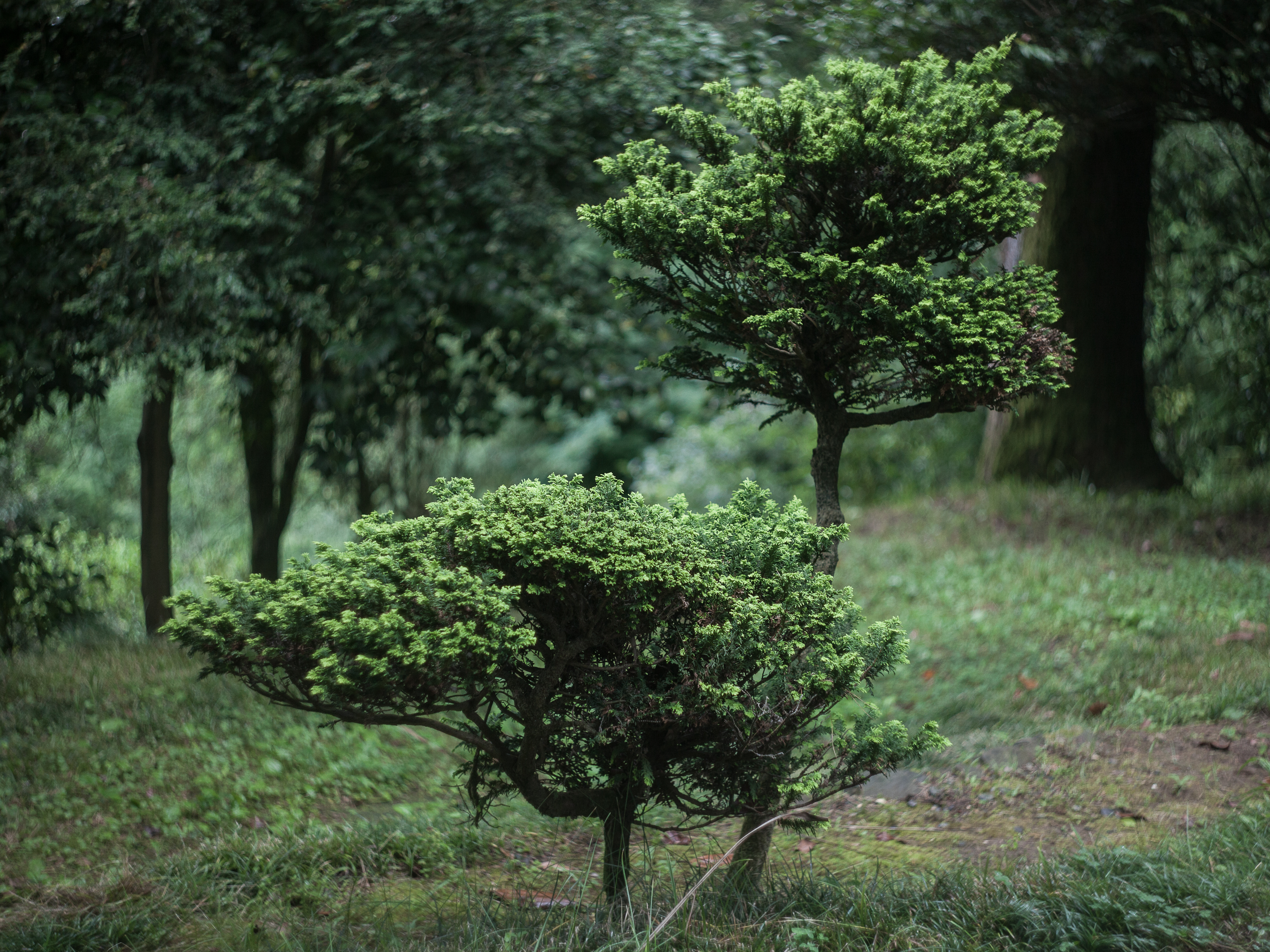

== Flora and collections ==
The Batumi Botanical Garden maintains a diverse living collection of more than 2,000 species and cultivars of woody plants from across the globe.

Notable groups include extensive collections of rhododendrons, camellias, and magnolias, as well as groves of bamboo, eucalyptus, and palm trees. Many of the plants on display are rare or endemic to their native habitats, with several classified as threatened in the wild. Seasonal highlights include the spring bloom of azaleas and cherry blossoms, the summer display of hibiscus and oleander, and the striking autumn foliage of maples and ginkgos.

Beyond ornamental plantings, the garden also operates herbarium collections, experimental plots for plant acclimatization, and living seed banks supporting the preservation of biodiversity in humid subtropical ecosystems. These facilities contribute to ongoing research in taxonomy, conservation biology, and horticulture.

== Tourism and visitor information ==
The Batumi Botanical Garden is one of the most visited tourist attractions in the Adjara region, drawing both domestic and international visitors year-round. The garden is open daily, with extended hours during the summer season, and charges a modest entrance fee used to support maintenance and conservation projects.

Facilities for visitors include well-marked walking trails, panoramic viewpoints, picnic areas, cafés, and souvenir kiosks. Guided tours in multiple languages are available, offering insights into the garden’s history, plant collections, and ongoing research. Seasonal exhibitions, plant sales, and educational workshops are held throughout the year, with spring and early summer being particularly popular due to the flowering of azaleas, rhododendrons, and roses.

The garden is accessible by road and by public transport from Batumi, including minibuses and taxis. Visitors can also reach the entrance via a scenic hiking trail from the Mtsvane Kontskhi railway station, which lies along the Georgian Railway’s coastal line. The elevated terrain and multiple entry points allow for both short visits and extended hikes that cover the entire 108-hectare site.

== History ==
The Batumi Botanical Garden was started by the Russian botanist Andrey Nikolayevich Krasnov (1862–1914), brother of General Pyotr Krasnov, in the 1880s and officially opened on November 3, 1912. He was aided by two skilled gardeners and decorators: the French D’Alphonse and the Georgian Yason Gordeziani. Krasnov died in 1914 and was interred at the garden which still houses his grave and statue.

Under the Soviet Union, the garden was further expanded and developed, since 1925, into a principal institution for the study of Caucasian maritime subtropical cultures.

Currently, the garden consists of nine floristic sectors, those of Caucasian humid subtropics, East Asia, New Zealand, South America, the Himalayas, Mexico, Australia, and of the Mediterranean. The garden collection comprises 2037 taxonomic units of woody plants, including 104 of Caucasian origin.

The Batumi Botanical Garden had formerly been operated by the Georgian Academy of Sciences. Since 2006, it is an independent institution.

== See also ==
- List of botanical gardens
