= Geoffroy de Thoisy =

Coat of arms of Geoffroy de Thoisy

Geoffroy de Thoisy, chevalier seigneur de Mimeure, was a Burgundian naval commander and Knight of the Order of the Golden Fleece involved in Philip the Good’s Crusade endeavors in the 1440s.

== Biography ==
He commanded a Burgundian flotilla organized by Philip III the Good, Duke of Burgundy (r. 1419–1467) in May 1441 at the request from the Knights Hospitaller to help defend Rhodes against the Mamluk Sultan of Egypt. The duke went in person to Sluis to see off his flotilla. Throughout 1442, de Thoisy's force was based at Rhodes, harassing the Muslim shipping and coastline. Having refitted at Villefranche, it was again in action off the North African coast and Rhodes in 1444. When a second Mamluk fleet assailed the island, the Burgundians helped the Hospitallers lift the siege of the town of Rhodes which lasted for forty days.

Next, in response to the Byzantine appeal for help against the Ottoman advance, Philip instructed de Thoisy to lead his squadron to reinforce a squadron of four galleys built or hired at Nice and Venice, commanded by Waleran de Wavrin, to join Pope Eugene IV's planned Crusade. De Wavrin's four galleys sailed in July 1444 but failed to stop Murad II's Anatolian army from crossing the Bosporus. De Thoisy joined de Wavrin's squadron at Constantinople, where the latter had gone to spend the winter. In the meantime, the crusading army led by Wladyslaw III of Poland (Ulaszlo I as king of Hungary) and Janos Hunyadi had been severely defeated by the united Anatolian and Rumelian armies of Murad II, on 10 November 1444, on the plain before Varna, on the coast of the Black Sea. In the spring of 1445, de Wavrin sailed to the Danube to join the Hungarians in the continuing Crusade, while de Thoisy took his ships along the south coast of the Black Sea.

He engaged in piracy there, plundering both ships and coastal settlements, covering the expenses for the re-equipment of his ships at Trebizond with five slave-women, worth in all 164 ducats. Then, de Thoisy decided to continue to the coast of Georgia, hoping to capture vessels carrying silk. Although the Emperor of Trebizond warned him that the people of Georgia were Christians, de Thoisy went ahead with his campaign, claiming that his orders were to fight all schismatics who did not obey the Pope. However, some Greeks from Trebizond informed the Georgians who, when they saw the galley coming, took up arms and waited in ambush. As soon as Thoisy landed at the port of Vaty (Batumi), the ambushers attacked, killing many of his men and taking him captive. The ones who managed to escape fled to the Genoese port of Caffa (modern Feodosiya, Ukraine) and reported to de Wavrin who dispatched the Hospitaller knight Sir Regnault de Confide to ask the Emperor of Trebizond to mediate for Thoisy's release. The Emperor was quick to send to Georgia and, by these means, Sir Geoffrey was set free. He was put safely on board the galley and sailed to Caffa, capturing on the way two Greek vessels with cargoes of fish. Eventually, de Thoisy's piracy led to a protest from the government of Genoa to the Duke of Burgundy. This forced de Thoisy to return to Constantinople, where he was invited by de Wavrin to join the forthcoming expedition with the Hungarians and Vlachs. He preferred to return with his ships to Nice and Villefranche, however. Later, in the 1450s, de Thoisy wrote memoranda of advice to the new Crusade endeavor planned (but never materialized) by Philip III.
