= Mindia Khitarishvili =

Israeli and Georgian composer (born 1973)

Mindia Khitarishvili მინდია ხითარიშვილი
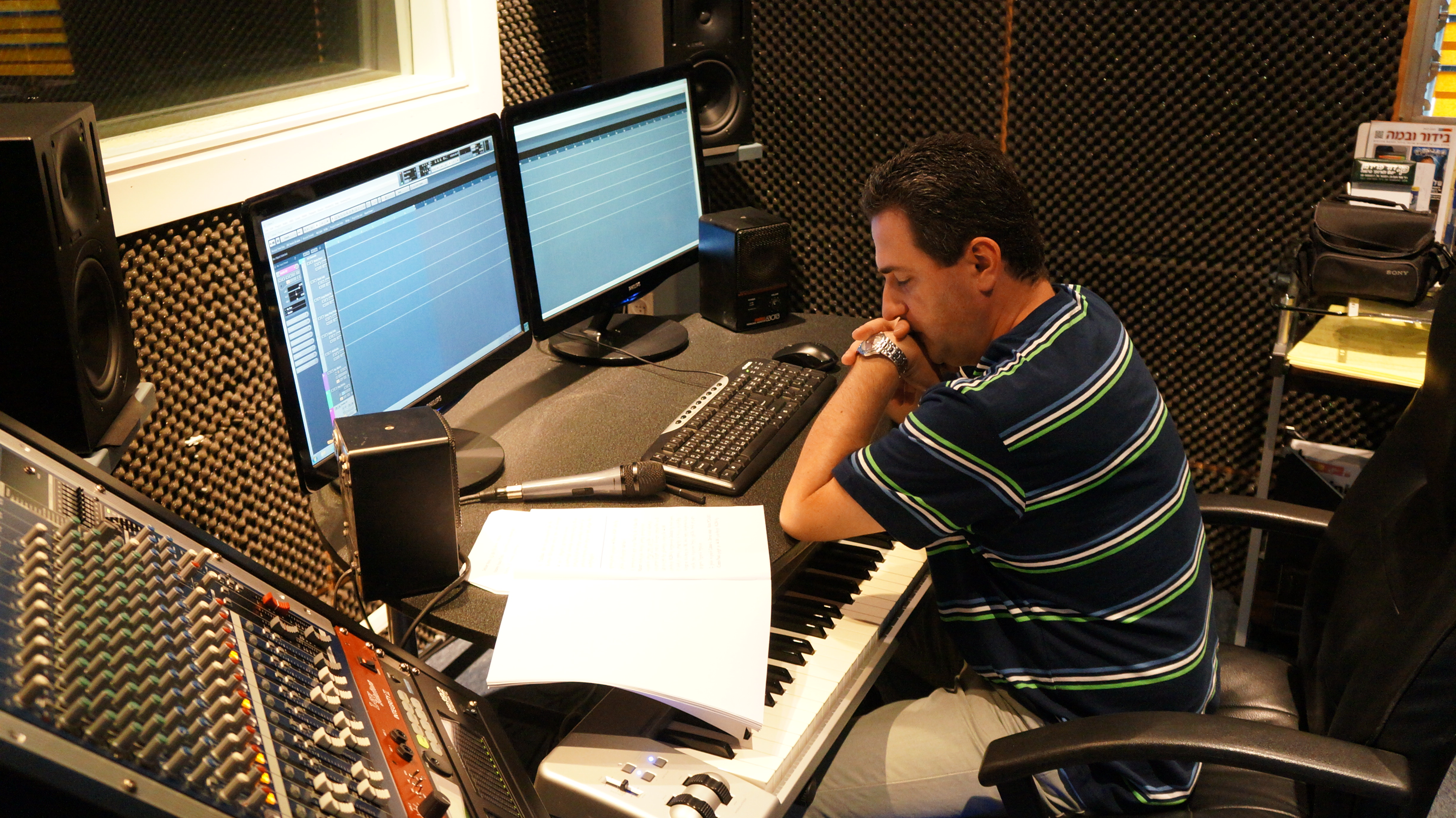

Background information
- Born: January 1, 1973 (age 53); Batumi, Georgia
- Genres: Avantgarde music, Jazz, Soundtrack, Music for cinema and theater
- Occupations: Composer, Arranger, Record producer
- Instruments: Piano, Synthesizer, harmonica
- Years active: 1996–present
- Website: mindiakhitarishvili.musicaneo.com

Mindia Khitarishvili (Georgian: მინდია ხითარიშვილი; Batumi, born January 1, 1973) is an Israeli and Georgian composer.

== Biography ==
Mindia Khitarishvili is an Israeli and Georgian composer, music arranger, music producer and teacher, currently residing in Haifa, Israel. Originally from Batumi, Georgia, Khitarishvilli studied choir conducting, piano and music theory at the Musical College of Batumi from 1987-1991. Upon graduating from the program, he continued his studies at the Tbilisi State Conservatory and the Academy of Arts of Georgia where he studied Musicological-Composition from 1991-1996. His studies included composition with Professor, N.Mamisashvili. Since 1996, Khitarishvili worked at the Batumi Music College. He worked as a musical editor at Adjara TV.

Khitarishvilli is a member of the Union of Composers and Authors of Georgia. He is also a member of the Adjarian union, since 2001, and organizes theatrical productions in Georgia. From 2001, Khitarishvilli worked at the Batumi State Conservatory (State University of the Arts) where he introduced courses in polyphony, orchestration, musical instrument classification (organology), jazz harmony and improvisation. Since 2004, Khitarishvilli worked as an orchestral arrangement specialist for the Batumi State Music Center. From 1998-2012, he was a music producer and composer for the Batumi State Puppet Theatre for Young People. For his significant contribution to the development of Georgian theater arts, in 2003, he was awarded the honorary title of Honored Worker of Arts of the Autonomous Republic of Adjara. He has received numerous awards, prizes and international diplomas.

In 2012, Khitarishvilli relocated to Haifa, Israel, where he worked as a music producer for GTV television. Khitarishvili is a composer of Haifa Theatre. He teaches theory, composition and piano at Dunie Weizman Conservatory of Music.

== Career ==
At the Batumi Musical Theater of the State Music Center, Khitarishvilli orchestrated and arranged the opera Princess Turandot, based on the story by Carlo Gozzi, V.Bellini's, Capuleti e Montecchi, Notre Dame de Paris by R. Cocciante and G. Presgurvic's Romeo e Giulietta. Mindia Khitarishvili is the author of two Rock-Operas—The Earth Time (Libretto J.Charkviani) and The Ballad of Tavparavneli (Libretto I.Gurieli), based on the play T.Chiladze, which premiered in 2010 under the direction of producer George Tavadze. Khitarishvilli 's accomplishments include a variety of symphonic, chamber - instrumental, choral, vocal and pop music. Among them: the Concerto for Two Pianos, Percussion and Strings; Chamber Symphony for baritone and string orchestra (2007); String Quartet, Withered beech (inspired by Vazha-Pshavela, 2008); Song cycle, Singing lines, for Mezzo-soprano and Piano (lyrics G.Tabidze); a variety of music for the cinema and theater; about 40 music drama and puppet performances, including, Flea and Ant /Rckili da chianchvela, Pippi Longstocking/Pepi grdzelitsinda (Director R.Bainazishvili), "Snow White and the Seven Dwarfs /Fifkia da shvidi juja, One Thousand and One Nights / Shahrazadas atas erti gamis zgapari, Noah's Ark /Noes kidobani (Director E.Tavartkiladze), The Bremen Town Musicians/ Bremeneli musikosebi, The Argonauts/Argonavtebi, Iron Heart/Rkinis guli, Mother Courage and Her Children /Deda kuraji da misi shvilebi/ (Director Z.Tsintsadze), Puss in Boots /Cheqmebiani kata/ (Director R.Geladze), The Ransom of Red Chief /Tsitelkanianta beladi, Dragon /Drakoni (Director T.Bolkvadze), The Naphthalene /Naftalini (Director R.Ioseliani), Beauty and the Beast /Mzetunakhavi da urchkhuli, Impatiens and Mouse /Tsuna da tsrutsuna (Director E.Matskhonashvili) and Coast of Colored Mists /Feradi nislebis sanapiro (Director D.Matskhonashvili).

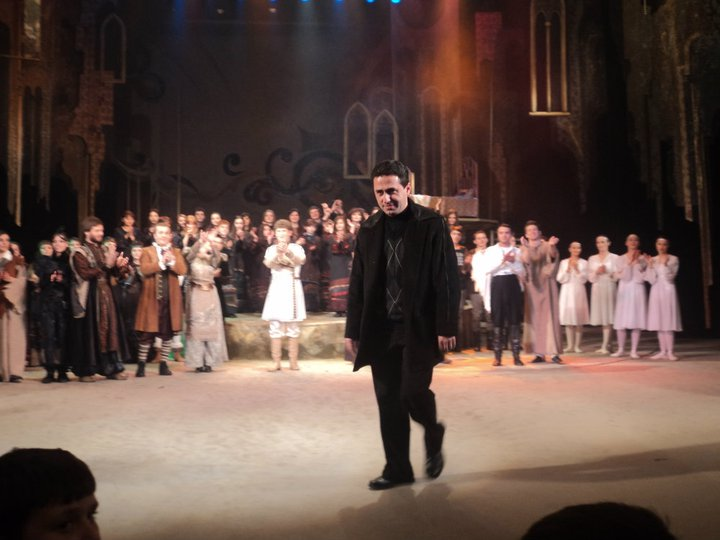
Mindia Khitarishvili takes a bow after the premier of his Rock-Opera "The ballad of Tavparavneli" (2010)

== List of works ==
Rock - Operas. "The Earth Time" /1996-98/ (Libretto J.Charkviani) "The ballad of Tavparavneli" In two acts. /2010/ (Libretto I.Gurieli) based on the play T.Chiladze. Premiered in 2010. Batumi State Drama Theatre. Director-producer George Tavadze. For the Symphony Orchestra Choreographic novels /2004/ Blues notes /2007/ Quinta essentia /2008/

For Choir and Orchestra. «Veni Vidi Vici» /1999/ Heavenly Voice /2000 /

Chamber Instrumental. Concerto for two pianos, string and percussion instruments. /2007/ Chamber Symphony for baritone and string orchestra. /2008/ Memory (for string orchestra) /2002/ Piano Trio /1998/ Piano Quintet /2003/ String Quartet "withered beech" /1996/ String Quartet /2004/ Night sketches. (for flute, oboe, cello and harmonium) /1997/ For two Guitars "Improvisation in the form of variations" /1999/ For two Pianos "Waltz - Ragtime," "Self-Portrait" /1997/ "Lyrical Ballads" Cycle for Bass and Guitar. (The words of the people) /1998/ Song cycle "Singing lines" for Mezzo-soprano and Piano (lyrics G.Tabidze) Three Preludes for saxophone and piano. /1998/ Sonata for Cello and Piano. /1996/ Sonata for Violin and Piano. /1997/

For Piano. Sonata - Fantasia "bells" "Improvisation in the form of variations" "Musical Moment","Impromptu","Kaleidoscope" "Postludia","of inertia","Humoresque".

For Chorus. "Elegy" (Lyrics I.Chavchavadze) "Voice Katamon" (Lyrics I.Abashidze) Jazz-Chorale (Lyrics V.Javakhadze) "He, like blood" (Lyrics M.Machavariani) "Prayer inspiration" (Lyrics T.Graneli)

Music for the Theatre. Vazha-Pshavela "Flea and ant" (Dramatization Ts.Antadze) /1998/, Astrid Lindgren "Pippi Longstocking" /1999/, R.Gurgenadze "bird of light" /1999/, The Brothers Grimm "The Wolf and the Seven Little Kids" /2001/ (Director R.Bainazishvili) L.Ustinov, O.Tabakov "Snow White and the Seven Dwarfs" /1999/, G.Nakhutsrishvili "One Thousand and One Nights" / 2000/, T.Chiladze "Noah's Ark" /2002/ (Director E.Tavartkiladze) O' Henry "The Ransom of Red Chief " /2000/, E. Schwartz "Dragon" /2006/ (Director T.Bolkvadze) B. Aprilov "The Adventures of Penguin" /2002/ (Director G.Sarchimelidze) French folk tale "Three Little Pigs" (Dramatization N. Antidze) /2006/ (Director G.Geladze) Charles Perrault "Puss in Boots" /2008/ (Director R.Geladze) L. Bugadze "Naphthalene" /2008/ (Director R.Ioseliani) E.Matskhonashvili "Beauty and the Beast" /2009/, "Impatiens and Mouse" /2010/ (Director E.Matskhonashvili) G. Oster "Hey monkey" /2006/, E.Uspensky "Crocodile Gena and his friends"/2006/, The Brothers Grimm "The Bremen Town Musicians" /2007/, N.Abuladze "The Argonauts" /2008/, Y.Olesha "Three Fat Men" /2010/, Bertolt Brecht "Mother Courage and Her Children" /2011/ (Director Z.Tsintsadze)

Theaters in Israel: A Very Simple Story /2015/, Shtrudel /2016/, Gates of Paradise /2017/ (Director A.Naifeld) By The Light of Other People's Candles /2017/ (Director H.Dolinger) Eric-Emmanuel Schmitt "Oscar and the Lady in Pink" /2019/ (Director O.Shatsman) Maurice Maeterlinck "The Blue Bird" /2020/ (Director A.Naifeld) "the corridor" /2020/ (Director I.Chubarova)
