= Batumi Archaeological Museum =

- ბათუმის არქეოლოგიური მუზეუმი
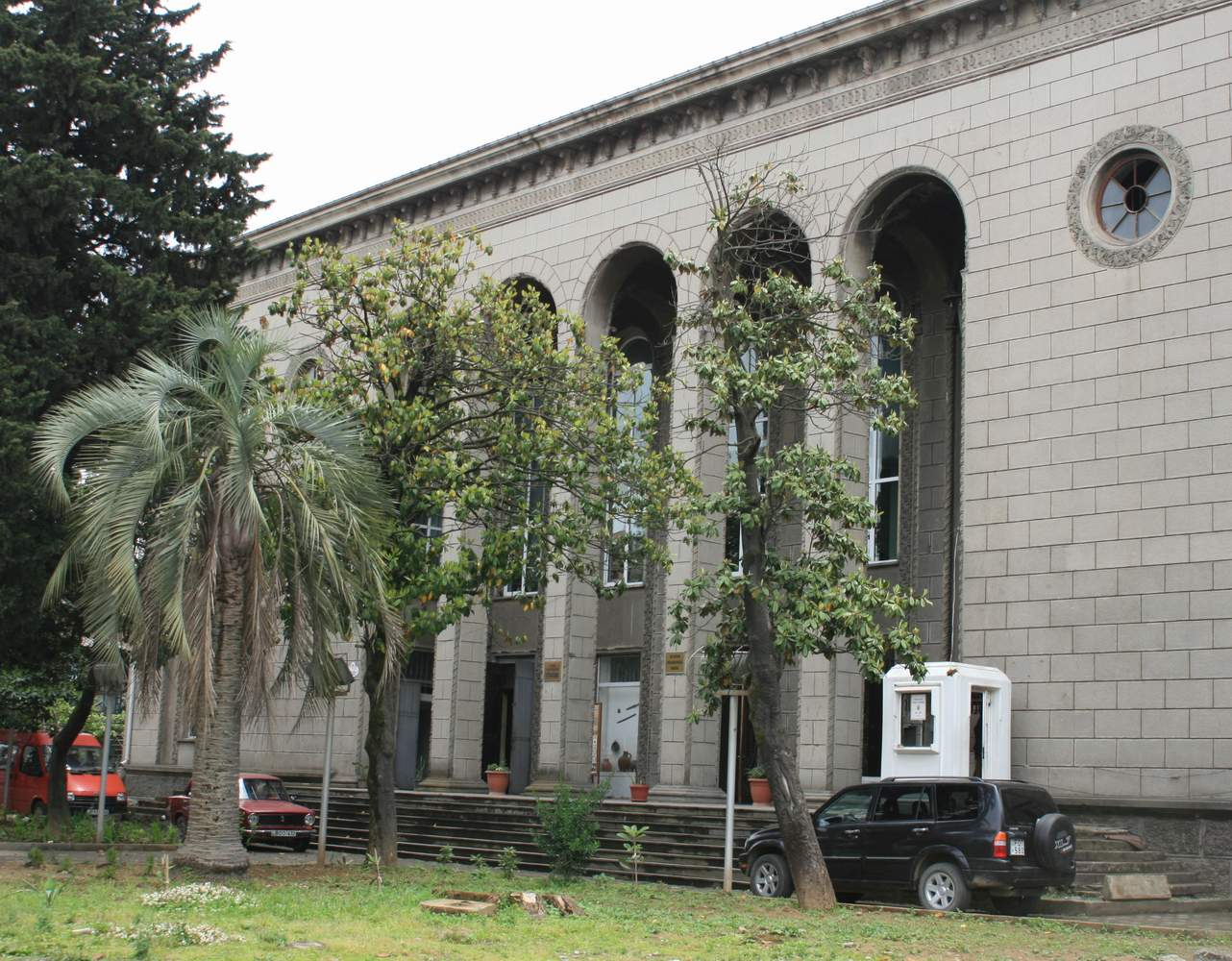
- Location: Batumi, Adjara, Georgia
- Coordinates: 41.6431882°N 41.6321945°E
- Type: Museum

Batumi Archaeological Museum (Georgian: ბათუმის არქეოლოგიური მუზეუმი) is an archaeological museum in the city of Batumi in Adjara, Georgia. It is one of the oldest museums in Georgia.

== See also ==
- List of museums in Georgia (country)
