= Batumi Bay =

Bay in Georgia

Coordinates: 41°39′23″N 41°39′34″E

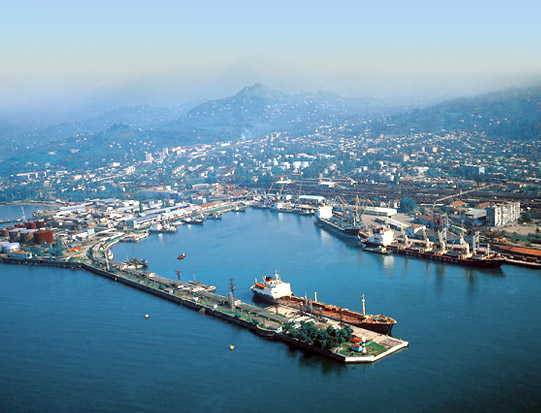

- Location within Georgia
- Location: Black Sea
- Ocean/sea sources: Atlantic Ocean
- Basin countries: Georgia
- Max. length: 1.5 km (0.93 mi)
- Max. width: 4 km (2.5 mi)
- Average depth: > 50 m (160 ft)

Batumi Bay (Georgian: ბათუმის ყურე) is a bay in the Black Sea near Batumi, Adjara.
