= Devi Khajishvili =

Georgian actor and model

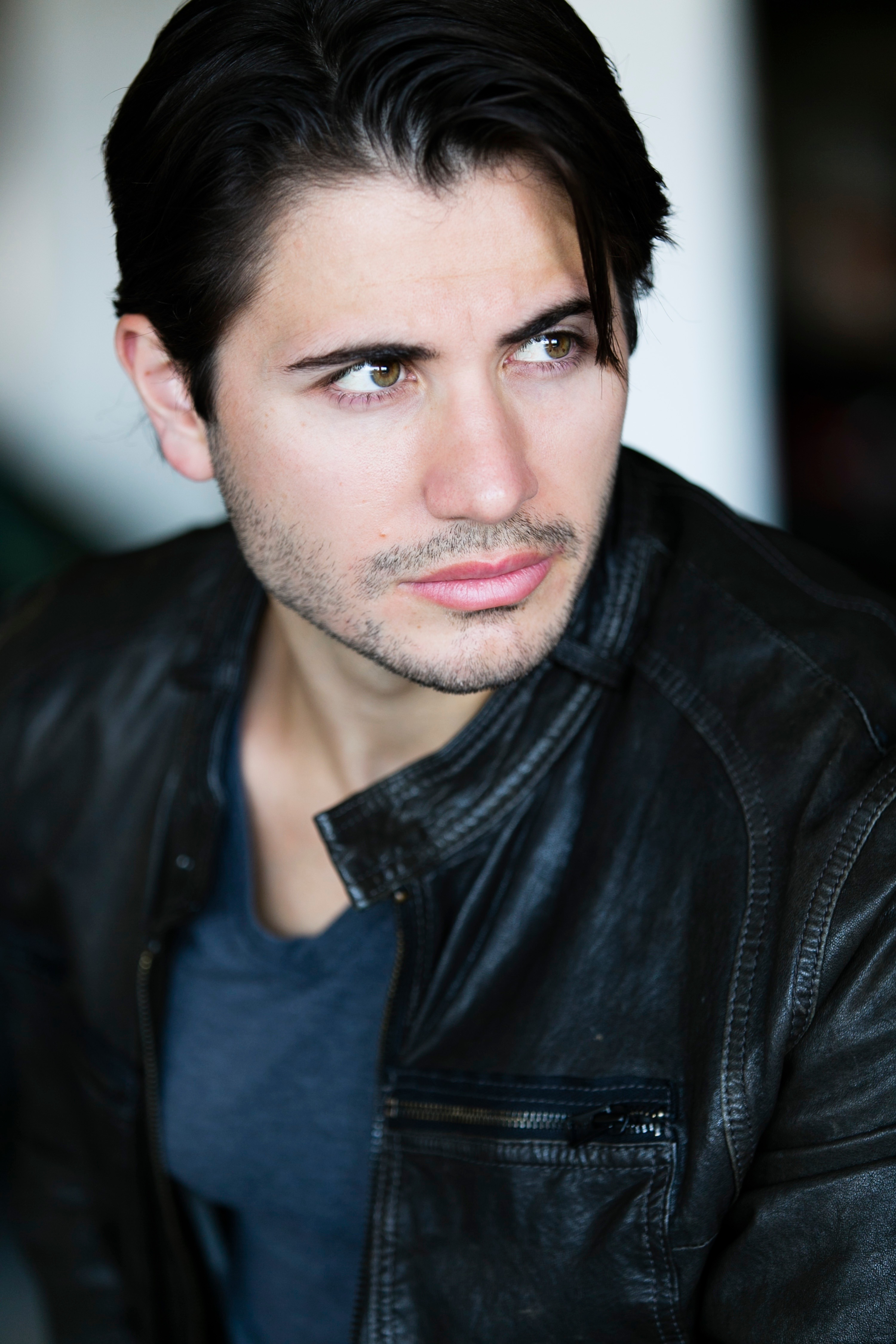
- Born: January 9, 1991 (age 35); Batumi, Georgia
- Education: Texas Tech University
- Occupation: Historian • Musician • Actor • Athlete
- Years active: 2006- Present
- Parent(s): Nodar Khajishvili, Nana Khajishvili
- Relatives: Elene Khajishvili, Sabina Khajishvili
- Awards: Gold Medal – World Martial Arts Festival, Cyprus, 2004; Silver Medal – 8th World Shotokan Championship, Tokyo, Japan, 2007; Gold Medal – World Shotokan Championship, Crawley, England, 2008; Fulbright-Hays Doctoral Dissertation Research Abroad Fellowship, 2024; Title VIII Summer Research Laboratory Associateship, Russian, East European, and Eurasian Center, University of Illinois Urbana-Champaign, 2023

Devi Khajishvili (Georgian: დევი ხაჯიშვილი; born 1991), also known as Devi K., is a Georgian-American actor and musician, and a doctoral candidate in history specializing in Soviet Studies. He is a Fulbright-Hays DDRA Fellow.

== Early life and career ==
Khajishvili was born to Nodar Khajishvili, president of the World Shotokan Karate-Do Federation in Georgia, and Nana Khajishvili a piano teacher. He is of Georgian descent from his paternal side and Russian, Ukrainian, Spanish and Iranian from his maternal grandparents. He began training in Shotokan Karate at age 6 under his father's guidance, and later competed in national and international tournaments. He became a two-time World Champion and was selected for Georgia’s national Shotokan Karate Team. In 2008, he was the youngest person included in a list of the most successful athletes of Georgia.

In 2023, he defended his fifth-degree black belt in an examination conducted by Sensei Kasuya Hitoshi, President of the World Shotokan Karate-Do Federation (WSKF).

== Education ==
In 2014, Khajishvili graduated from Texas Tech University with a Bachelors in Political Science and moved to Washington D.C. to work for Congressman Beto O'Rourke. While working in Rep. Beto O’Rourke’s office, Khajishvili met with visiting Georgian officials, like the former Prime Minister of Georgia Irakli Garibashvili, former Georgian Ambassador to the United States Archil Gegeshidze, and the founder of the Georgian Labour Party Shalva Natelashvili.

Khajishvili then pursued Master of Science in International Affairs. In 2024, as a PhD candidate in History at Texas Tech University, Khajishvili was awarded a Fulbright-Hays DDRA Fellowship, funded by the U.S. Department of Education, to support one year of research in Georgia. His research examines Soviet-era Georgian tea production, tracing how commodity culture shaped consumer identity in the USSR. He discussed this research in a Georgian-language episode of the MISMINE podcast series Aktualuri Istoria (Topical History) in the episode “Chineli katsi da kartuli chai” (“The Chinese Man and Georgian Tea”).

Khajishvili speaks five languages; Georgian, Russian, French, Spanish and English.

== Film and stage ==
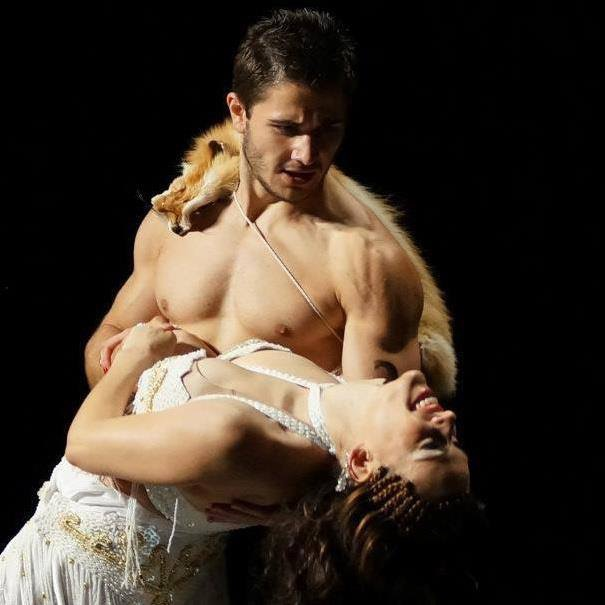
Devi Khajishvili performs The Knight in the Panther's Skin

After moving to the United States, Khajishvili continued performing Georgian dance and organizing university performances related to Georgian literature and culture. In a 2019 interview, he said he produced a university staging connected to Shota Rustaveli’s The Knight in the Panther’s Skin (Vepkhistqaosani), incorporating Georgian dance elements. Khajishvili has been profiled in Georgian media outlets, including Ambebi.ge and Imedi TV.

Khajishvili first gained wider visibility in the United States through modeling work with Los Angeles-based photographer Michael Stokes, who featured him in his 2014 book Bare Strength. A Stokes photograph featuring Khajishvili was later used as the cover image for Jen Frederick’s 2016 novel Jock Blocked. Next Devi Khajishvili moved into acting co-starring with Richard Riehle in the 2017 romantic-comedy You Have a Nice Flight. In 2018, he played Vincent in the horror film Lake Fear 3. In 2017, he appeared in the Los Del Arroyo music video "Por Si Te Interesa", released by DEL Records, a Latin independent entertainment label based in the Los Angeles area.

== Music ==
Khajishvili releases music under the stage name Devi K.. In 2024, he released the rock album The War Within, a 14-track record. In 2023, he released the Spanish-language single "Una Asesina". In 2024, he released the single "300 Aragvians". His earlier releases include the EP Runaway Train (2020).
