= Lado Seidishvili =

Georgian painter and poet (1931–2010)

Vladimir (Lado) Osmanis Dze Seidishvili (also spelled Seidashvili) (21 January 1931, Batumi, Georgia – 27 February 2010) was a Georgian painter and poet.

In 1956, Seidishvili studied at the Tbilisi Fine Arts Academy, finishing in 1962 with a diploma as a graphic artist. That year, he began working at Batumi's national press as an artist-editor. He also wrote poetry, plays, and made stage scenery for the theater. He did so for the plays "Seventh Sky", "Innocent Eye", and "Brave Soldier Shveiko".

Seidishvili himself characterized his work as mainly expressionistic, though, like many artists from the Soviet era, he painted his early works in the Severe or Rough style, sometimes called "Ugly Realism". It reflects the concept of "narodnost", which essentially means that a work of art should be "national in style and socialist in content". At the same time, in Seidishvili's works one can see an archaic native treatment in the almond eyes of his characters, graceful outlining of their figures, and a frieze-like quality of composition. The artist admits: "There was always an optimistic light in my works. I've always believed that good times would come."

One of Seidishvili's original works, The Workers From Batumi, (1966) can be viewed in the Springville Museum of Art in Utah. This work is also featured in the book Hidden Treasures: Russian and Soviet Impressionism by Vern Swanson (2001).

Lado Seidishvili’s published poetry books include Poems (1961), Sun Noises (1963), Wreath of Sonnets (1972), Elesa (1969), Adam’s Apple (1995), Poems (2001), and Requiem (2005).

Lado Seidishvili died on February 27, 2010, and is interred in the pantheon for celebrated citizens in Batumi, Georgia.
