= Batumi Piazza =

Plaza in Batumi, Georgia

Coordinates: 41°38′58.6″N 41°38′28.1″E

The Batumi Piazza (Georgian: ბათუმის პიაცა) is an Italian-style open public area in the city of Batumi, Georgia. Various significant buildings surround the piazza which has open air cafes, hotels, and shopping. The piazza is one of the most visited and popular sights of the Batumi, located in the Seaside Zone about 4 blocks from the Black Sea.

== Mosaic ==
A unique feature of the piazza square is a central mosaic of 106 sq m. which is considered the largest figurative marble mosaic in Europe. The author is a Georgian-Swiss designer Natali (Natalia) de Pita Amirejibi.

The mosaic was created in 2010, according to de Pita-Amirejbi’s original sketches at the Fantini Mosaici workshop in Abu Dhabi. Upon its completion the mosaics were transferred to Batumi and then assembled piece by piece under Natali de Pita Amirejibi’s personal supervision in August 2010.

The concept of the whole mosaic is a harmony between sea elements and an unceasing modern urban expanse. The mosaic composition consists of eight circles laid one in the other, which reminds us of whirlpools on a sea surface. Each circle is decorated with ornamental and figurative elements, wherein the central circle is a figurative composition of five female figures. These clothed in red, light blue, purple, pink and green figures embody female hypostases of marine deities. Where the colour worn by the goddesses chimes with their individual persona’s characters. Also, it’s known that a prototype for the central figure of the composition, a small siren (mermaid), was the designer’s five year old daughter Romina.

The mosaic was constructed from 88,244,735 cut and finished elements of 1 square cm each in size and jointed into 1,764,895 segments. The marble used for the mosaic came from 15 different countries. However, the materials used for depicting the purple dress of the Marine goddess and a darker part of the red dress of another figure are smalt and ceramics.

== Gallery ==
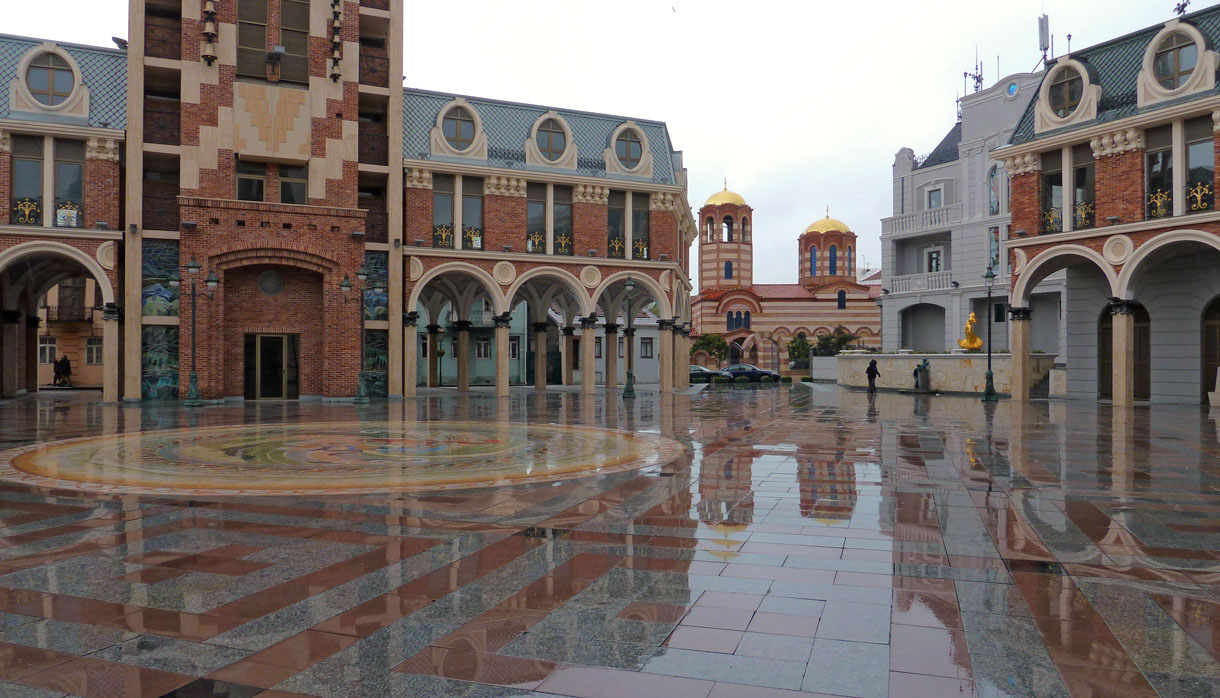

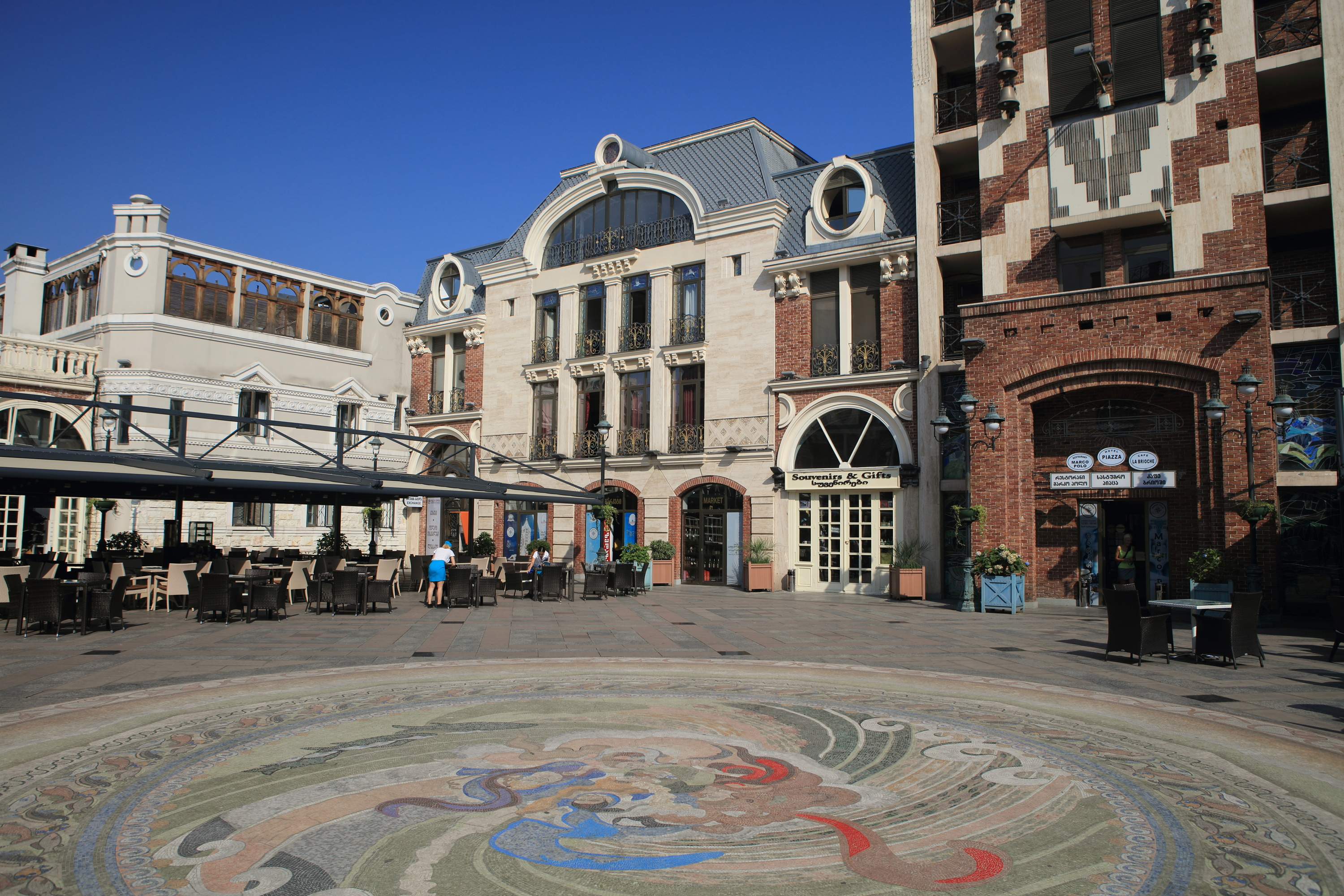

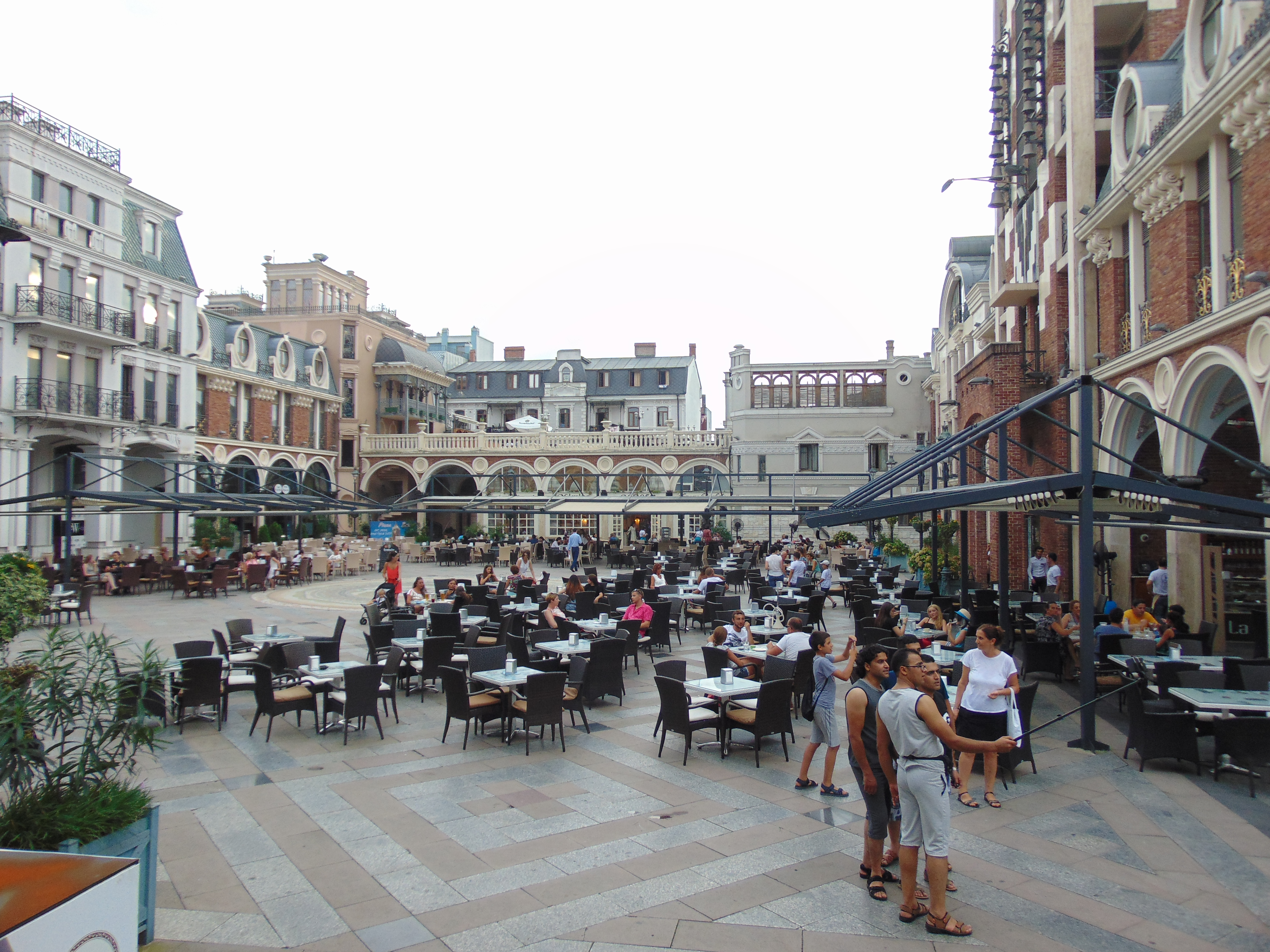
