= S2 highway (Georgia) =

Trunk road in Georgia

S2
- საერთაშორისო 2
- Senaki-Poti-Sarpi

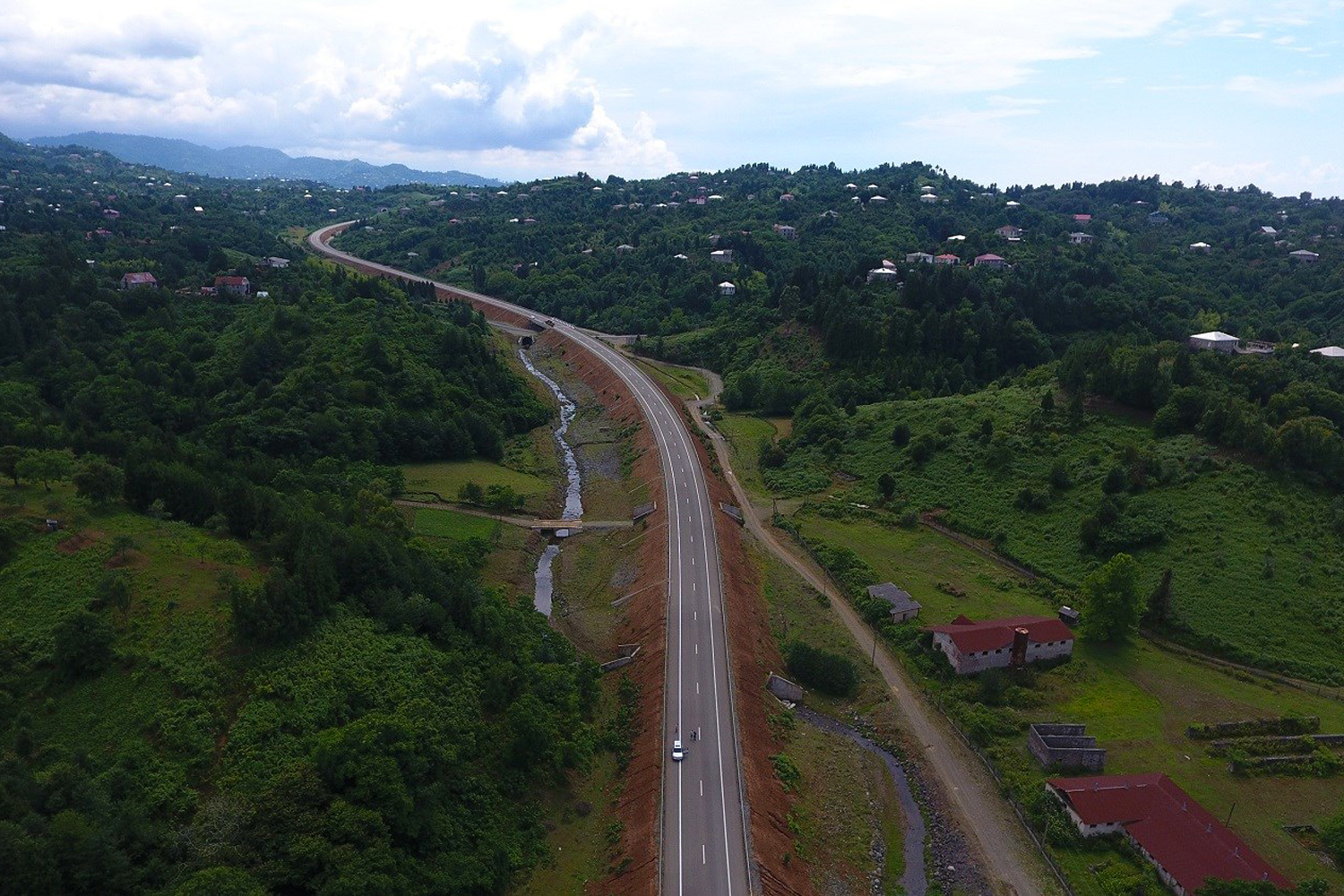
- Kobuleti bypass near Shuagele

Route information
- Part of
- Length: 119 km (74 mi)
- Existed: 1996–present

Major junctions
- North end: Senaki
- (km) 0 S1 to Tbilisi / Zugdidi 46 S12 to Samtredia 73 Sh2 to Ozurgeti 90 Sh205 to Chakvi 105 Sh1 to Akhaltsikhe
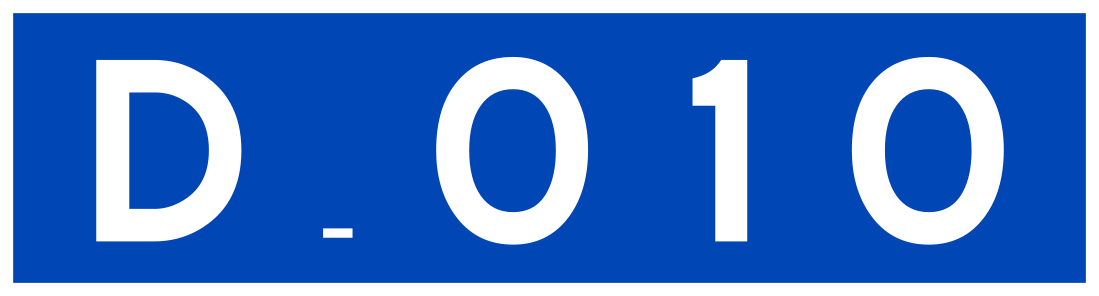
- South end: Sarpi (Turkey)

Location
- Georgia
- Municipalities: Senaki, Khobi, Poti, Lanchkhuti, Ozurgeti, Kobuleti, Batumi, Khelvachauri
- Major cities: Senaki, Poti, Kobuleti, Batumi

Highway system
- Roads in Georgia; International Routes; National Routes

The Georgian route S2 (Georgian: საერთაშორისო მნიშვნელობის გზა ს2, Saertashoriso mnishvnelobis gza S2, road of international importance), also known as Senaki-Poti-Sarpi (Turkish border), is a "road of international importance" within the Georgian road network which runs from Senaki via Poti, Kobuleti, and Batumi to the border with Turkey near Sarpi (Adjara) with a length of 119 kilometres (74 mi). After crossing the Georgian-Turkish border the highway continues as D.010 ("Black Sea Coastal Road") to Trabzon. The S2 highway is part of European E60, E70, E97 and Asian AH5 routes and is mostly built as a 2-lane road through villages, towns and cities. Part of the highway has been upgraded in recent years to a single carriageway with hard shoulder bypassing residential communities.

== Background ==
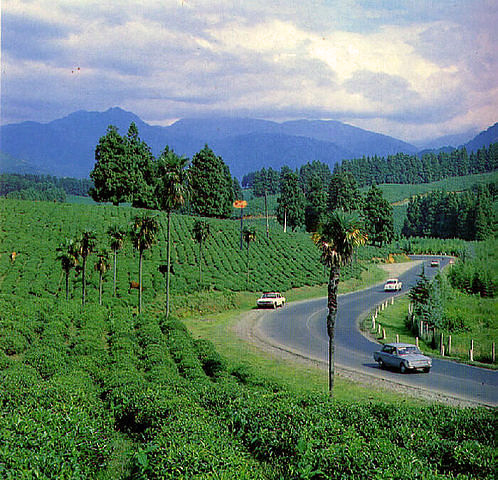
Soviet road [19] near Chakvi (1970s)

Since a 1960 Soviet decree the Kobuleti-Batumi section of the current S2 was part of Soviet main road 19, one of only 37 listed routes in the Soviet Union, which ran between Novorossiysk and Batumi via Samtredia and Ozurgeti. The Samtredia-Ozurgeti-Kobuleti part of this route 19 followed the current Sh2 route. In 1982 the Soviet road numbering system was overhauled and the foundation of the current S2 was laid: the A-305 number was designated to Mikha Tskhakaya (Senaki) - Batumi via Poti.

After Georgia regained independence in 1991, the A-305 designation was maintained until 1996 when the current route numbering system was adopted. In that year the "roads of international importance" (S-)category was introduced and the "ს2 Senaki-Poti-Sarpi (Turkish border)" replaced the A-305 number. Compared to the A-305 the S2 route was extended from the north side of Batumi through the city to the Turkish border at Sarpi. Initially the road was registered with a length of 121 kilometres (75 mi) km, but the opening of the Chakvi-Makhinjauri tunnel north of Batumi reduced the length reduced to 119 kilometres (74 mi).

The S2 highway is built as a simple two lane road, but parts have been and will be upgraded to higher standards within the scope of the 2005 initiated East-West Highway project. In a separate project, the dual tube four lane 650 m Chakvi-Makhinjauri tunnel which bypasses a curvy section of the highway was the first major upgrade to the S2 highway. It was completed in September 2005. The construction of the tunnel initially started in 2001, but came to a halt in April 2004 due to Adjara crisis in that period. The crisis resulted in the central government of Georgia regaining authority over the Autonomous Republic of Adjara, the location of the tunnel. In spring 2005 works resumed.

== East-West Highway ==
The S2 route is under major redesign since 2011

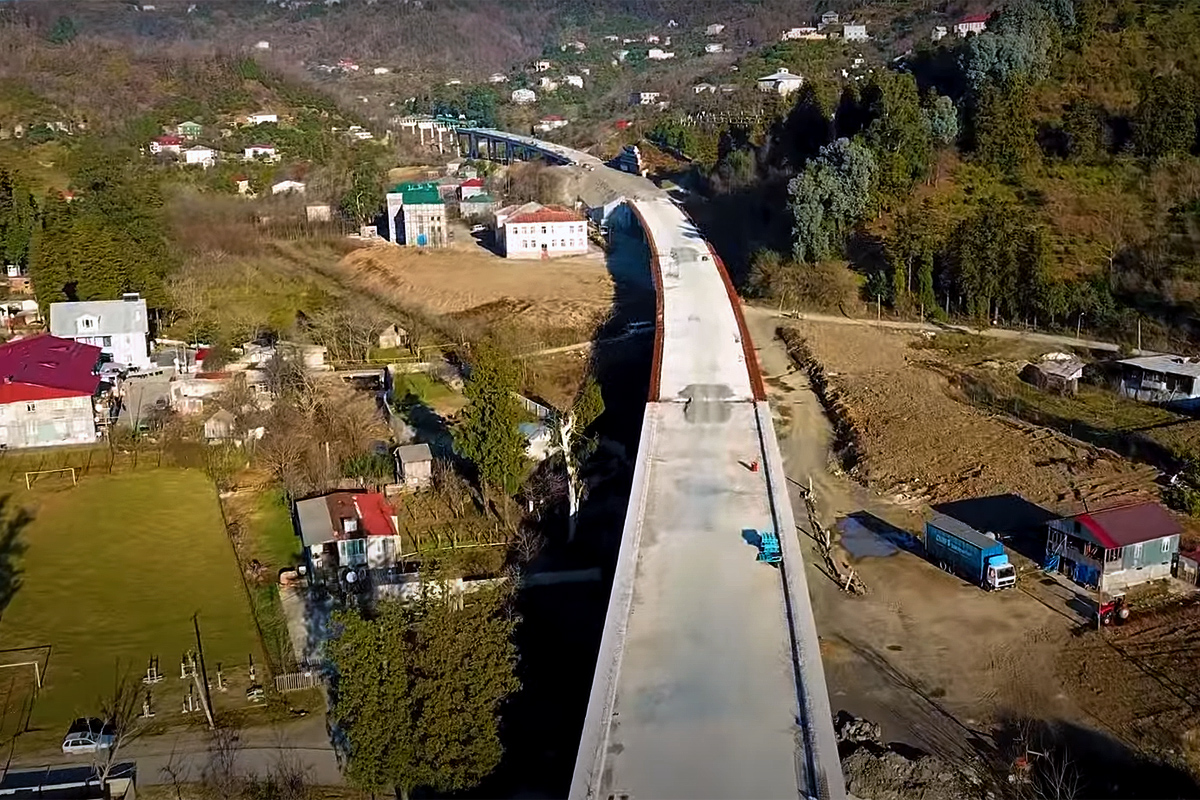
Batumi Bypass under construction (2018-)

In 2005 the Georgian government initiated the East-West Highway project, an ambitious internationally sponsored long term project which aims to create a 455 kilometres (283 mi) east-west transport corridor through Georgia, connecting Azerbaijan and Armenia with Turkey by upgrading Georgian sections of the E60 (Poti-Tbilisi-Red Bridge, Azerbaijan) and E70 (Poti-Batumi-Sarpi, Turkey) highways to strengthen Georgia's position as South Caucasus transport hub.

The East-West Highway project includes redesign of major sections of the Georgian S1, S2, S4, S12 and more recently the S7 highway, to grade-separated highways, mostly as 2x2 expressway or motorway. Since 2006 nearly 200 kilometres (120 mi) of Georgian highways has been realigned and upgraded to expressway or motorway standards, while parts of the S2 have been realigned as two-lane expressway within this project.

Despite earlier political promises the East-West Highway would be finished by 2020, the construction of crucial sections, including the S2 highway, is still ongoing (as of 2021) until at least 2024. The project is sponsored by European and Asian development banks, the World Bank, European Union and others, with credits amounting to more than $2 billion for the S1 upgrades alone (plus additional state funding), while the S2 upgrades amount to $800 million. Construction companies from various European and Asian countries have been involved, with mixed success. Some tenders ran into technical and legal issues, with some contracts having been terminated by the Georgian government due to excessive underperformance of the contracted party, resulting in multiple year delays on various lots.

For the S2 highway the (E60/E70) East-West Highway project is scoped to the 73 kilometres (45 mi) Grigoleti - Sarpi, Georgia section. As early as 2005 the Georgian government identified and studied the need for bypasses around Kobuleti and Batumi for a better traffic flow in connection with the S12 Samtredia — Grigoleti. This means that most of the new Grigoleti to Sarpi section has been redesigned inland, bypassing towns and villages. The project envisions to upgrade the S2 between Grigoleti and Shekvetili as extension of the S12 to (2x2) expressway/motorway standards and the Kobuleti and Batumi Bypasses as two-lane expressway.

Grigoleti — Shekvetili - The 14 kilometres (8.7 mi) between Grigoleti (S12) and Shekvetili (north end Kobuleti Bypass) has been under construction since 2019 as a 2x2 motorway, but completion has been delayed with an unknown period. The connection of the S2 with the S12 (under construction as 2x2 motorway) will be moved to the southside of the Supsa river mouth for a seamless flow of the S12 into the S2 in southern direction. In december 2022 the southern 5 kilometres (3.1 mi) near Shekvetili was opened as motorway. This part connects to the Kobuleti Bypass.

Kobuleti Bypass - In 2018 the 30 kilometres (19 mi) long Kobuleti Bypass between Shekvetili and Chakvi has been completed as a two-lane expressway with hard shoulders, bypassing the popular Kobuleti resort and other villages, running inland away from the coastline. The old route of the S2 along the Black Sea coast between Shekvetili and Chakvi via Kobuleti town has been renumbered as Sh205.

Batumi Bypass - Since 2018 the 16 kilometres (9.9 mi) long Batumi Bypass between the Chakvi-Makhinjauri tunnel near Mtsvane Kontskhi and the Chorokhi River is under construction through mountainous terrain. Similarly to the Kobuleti Bypass, this will be a two-lane expressway featuring 19 bridges, 4 interchanges and 5 tunnels. With over a year delay, this is set to be finished by 2022 according to government sources.

Batumi — Sarpi - The 12 kilometres (7.5 mi) Batumi (Chorokhi) - Sarpi section was under study in 2018. No further plans have been developed, yet funding via the Asian Development Bank has been secured for $200 million. The steep cliffs along the Black Sea coast leaves little room for expansion of the road.

Below is an overview of S2 sections that have been or are being upgraded within the East-West Highway project, in consecutive order from North (Grigoleti) to South (Sarpi).

Segment	Lot	Length	Funding	Contractor	Start Construction	Opened	Remarks
Grigoleti to Kobuleti Bypass		14.4 km	EIB (€101m)	Polat Yol (TK)	Feb 2019		2x2 lane motorway from S12 to Kobuleti Bypass, partially opened in Dec. 2022.
Kobuleti Bypass	Lot-1a Shekvetili — Kakucha (Sh2)	12.4 km	ADB Tranche 1 $119m + $30m (State budget); ADB Tranche 3 $140m + $25m (State budget)	Sinohydro (CN)	Mar 2011	Oct 2013	Kobuleti Bypass built as two-lane expressway
Kobuleti Bypass	Lot-2 Kakucha (Sh2) - Chakvi	18 km	ADB Tranche 1 $119m + $30m (State budget); ADB Tranche 3 $140m + $25m (State budget)	Sinohydro (CN)	Sep 2013	Jun 2018	Section contains 2 tunnels and 15 bridges, among the longest of Georgia of 1180 m.
Kobuleti Bypass	Lot-1b Road at Chakvi tunnel	1.3 km	ADB Tranche 1 $119m + $30m (State budget); ADB Tranche 3 $140m + $25m (State budget)	Sinohydro (CN)	2017	June 2018	Upgrade 1.3 km of existing road to tunnel to four lanes
Chakvi-Makhinjauri tunnel		1 km			2001	Sep 2005	Dual tube four lane tunnel (650 m)
Batumi Bypass	Mtsvane Kontskhi — Khelvachauri	16 km	ADB ($114m); State budget $87m	Polat Yol (TK)	Apr 2018	Oct 2024	Batumi Bypass is built as a two-lane expressway with 19 bridges and 5 tunnels
Batumi - Sarpi		12 km	ADB ($200m)				Proposed. In preparation.
1.000 km = 0.621 mi: Under construction; Planning/Proposed

== Other upgrades ==
A new bridge in the S2 across the Rioni River near Poti was announced, and construction tenders were published in 2021. The old bridge, a hydropower dam from 1959, is allegedly in bad shape even though the hydropower plant itself has been rehabilitated in 2018. The new bridge will be 500 meters long and will have a single carriageway plus hard shoulders. In November 2021 the Roads Department of the Ministry of Regional Development and Infrastructure announced construction will commence and that the Asian Development Bank finances the project expenses of $20 million.

No other upgrades of the S2 highway have been scheduled. The Senaki-Poti-Grigoleti section will remain an at-grade two lane highway for the foreseeable future (as of 2021).

== Route ==
About 5 kilometres (3.1 mi) West of Senaki the S2 highway branches off the S1 highway and heads west to the Black Sea port of Poti, after which the route turns south along the Black Sea coast to the resort and port city of Batumi. The highway reaches its southern terminus in Sarpi at the Georgia–Turkey border. The entire highway is built as a two lane road.

=== Senaki — Poti ===
Between Senaki and Poti the road passes through a few villages and runs along the Senaki-Poti railway line through the Rioni river delta. Upon entering Poti it crosses the Rioni river via the Hydropower Dam. At the north side of the city the highway turns south at which corner the European E70 route has its eastern terminus. The highway circumvents the city centre, and after crossing the Rioni canal the European E60 route separates from the highway and turns to the port of Poti. The Poti seaport is a cross point of the Trans-Caucasian Corridor/TRACECA, a multinational project which connects the Romanian port of Constanţa and Bulgarian port Varna with the landlocked countries of the Caspian region and Central Asia. The E60 continues on the other side of the Black Sea, in Constanţa.

=== Poti — Kobuleti ===
The S2 highway leaves Poti city in southern direction via the narrow strip of land that separates Lake Paliastomi from the Black Sea. At Grigoleti the road junctions with the S12 highway which is the main route to Samtredia and Tbilisi. Passing the Supsa river, the two lane highway meets the hills of Guria but remains in the lowlands. After the upgrade of the S12 to 2x2 lane motorway the connection with the S2 will be moved to the south side of the Supsa river mouth. The S12 will flow seamlessly into the S2 in southern direction, and the S2 will become a 2x2 motorway until the Kobuleti Bypass at Shekvetili. The Kobuleti Bypass extends South for 30 kilometres (19 mi) until the northern area of Batumi near its famous Botanical Garden. The bypass has been constructed in the period 2014-2018 as two-lane expressway with a speed limit of 90 km/h (55 mph).

=== Kobuleti — Batumi — Sarpi ===
After passing Kobuleti resort the bypass enters the Adjara mountains and follows a curvy route with many bridges and a few tunnels. At Chakvi the highway passes through the dual tube 4-lane Chakvi-Makhinjauri tunnel which opened in 2005 and relieved traffic from a very curvy passage across the hills. At the south side of the Chakvi-Makhinjauri tunnel the Batumi Bypass will begin upon its expected completion as two-lane expressway by 2024. In the meantime the highway reaches the Black Sea coast and enters Batumi, Georgia's second largest city. After passing the port the road turns into the city centre. At the south side of the centre the road turns towards the airport which it circumvents to reach the Black Sea coast again south of the Chorokhi river. During the last kilometers to the Turkish border the mountains leave little room for the road and communities. The border checkpoints have little room as well, and the ever increasing truck traffic leads to long queues along the coast.

== Intersections ==
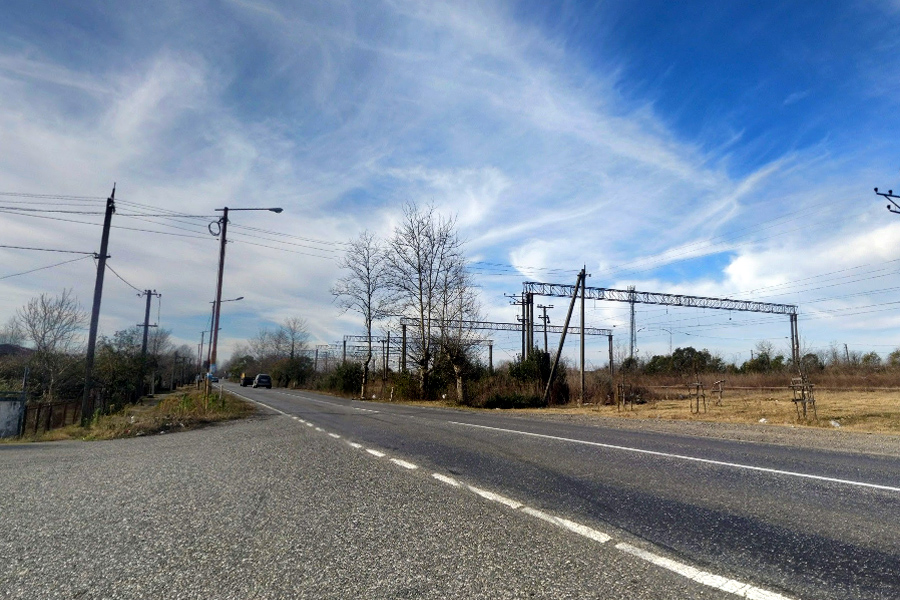
Between Senaki and Poti

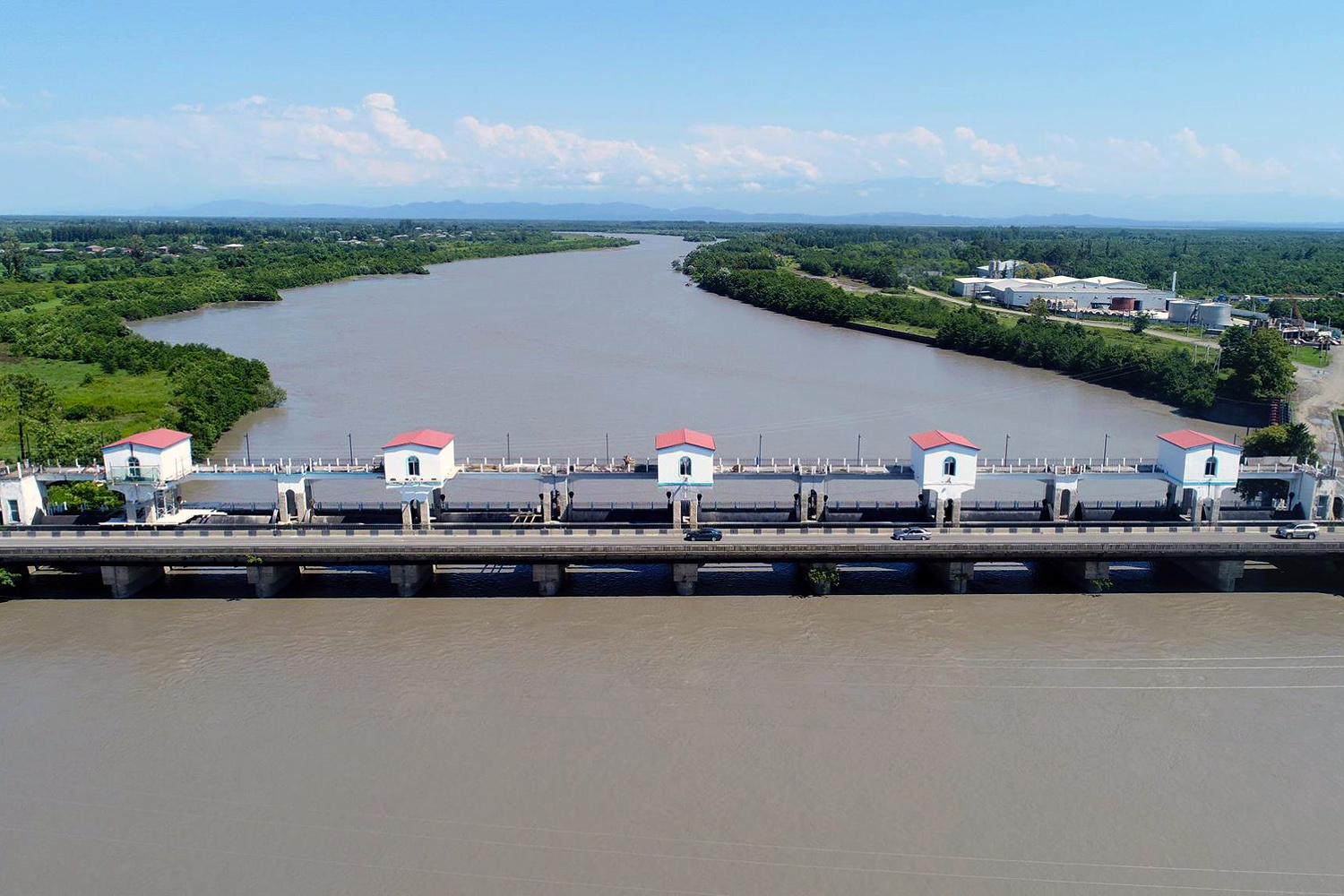
Rioni bridge in Poti

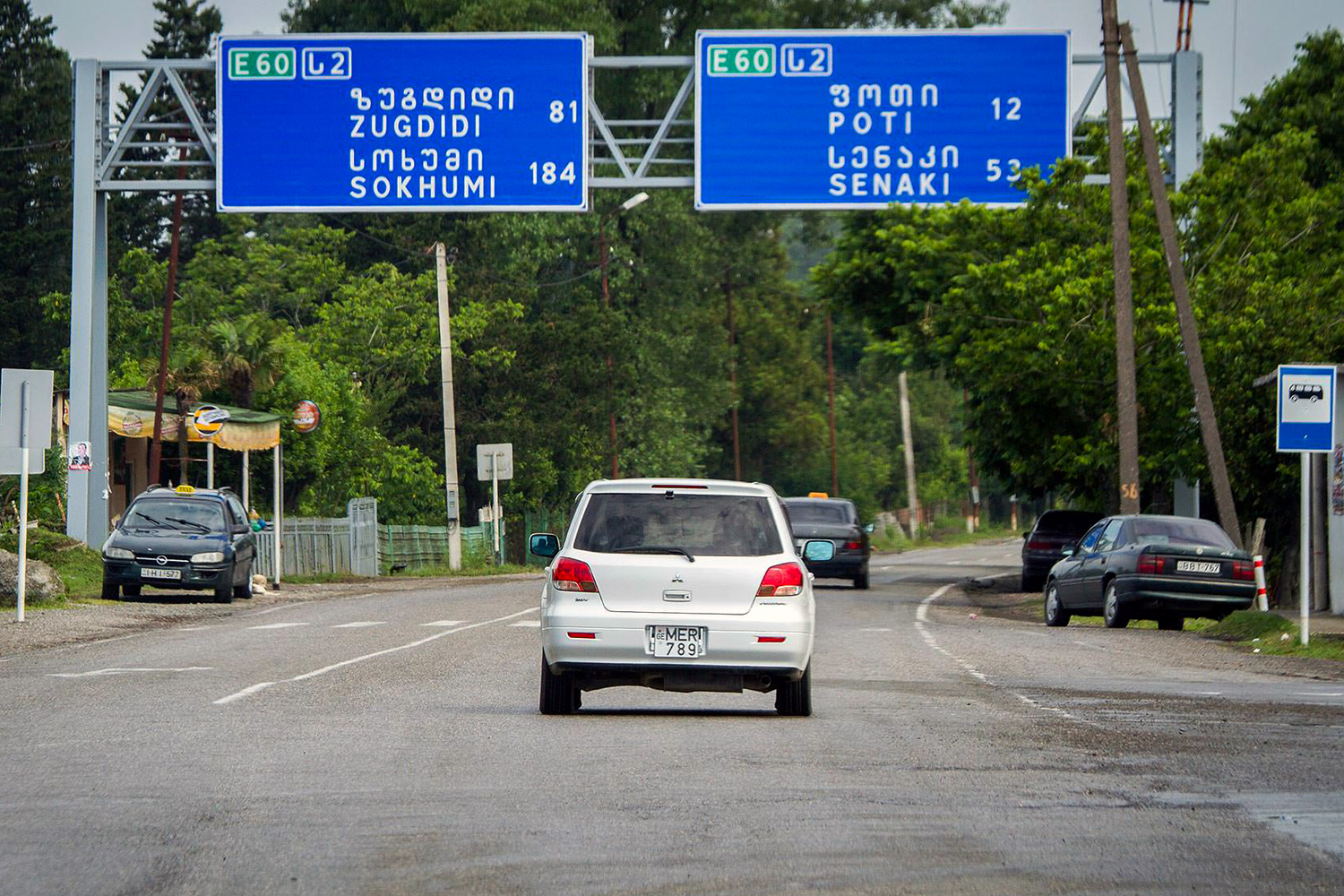
At Grigoleti intersection S12

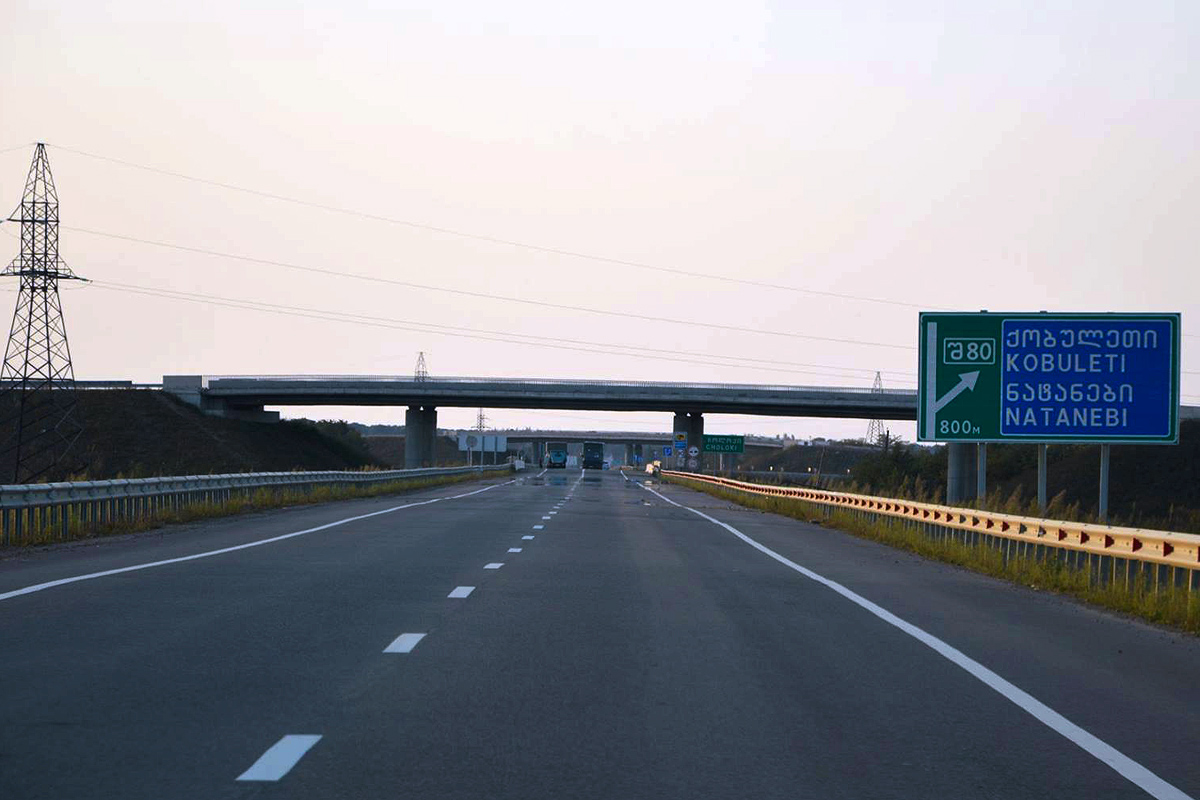
Kobuleti Bypass near Natanebi

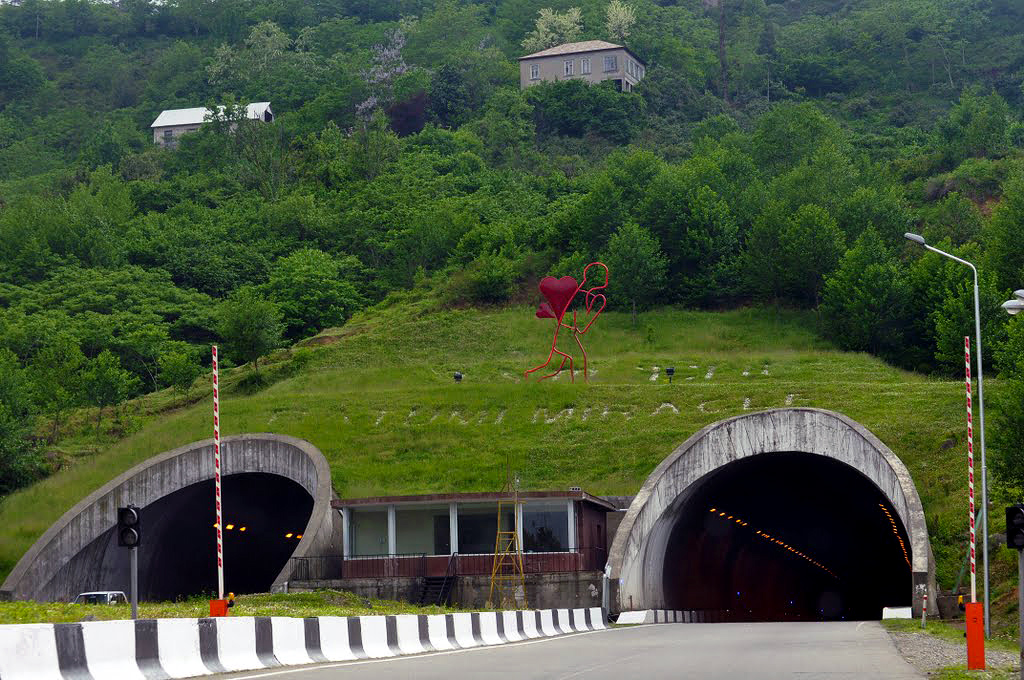
Chakvi-Makhinjauri tunnel

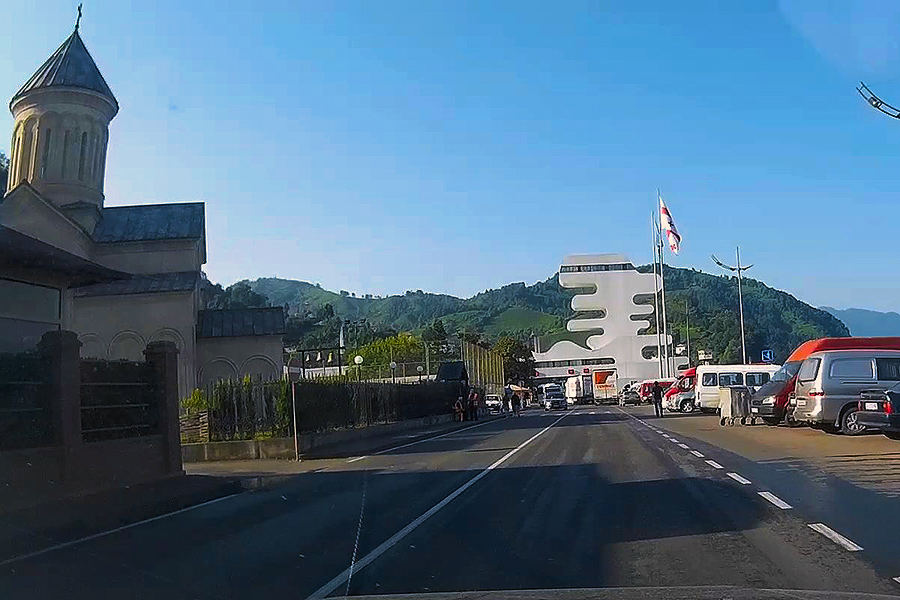
Georgian border checkpoint Sarpi

The entire S2 route overlaps with E97 and AH5 routes. The Kobuleti Bypass section of the S2 has many bridges, river crossings and some tunnels. A selection is mentioned.

Region	Municipality	km	mi		Destinations	Route	Notes
Samegrelo-Zemo Svaneti	Senaki	0	0.0	Left junction	Zugdidi / Sokhumi Samtredia / Tbilisi	S1 highway (Georgia) European route E97 AH82	Highway to (Russia) via Zugdidi and Sokhumi
Samegrelo-Zemo Svaneti	Senaki	0	0.0	Left junction	Zugdidi / Sokhumi Samtredia / Tbilisi	S1 highway (Georgia) European route E60 AH5 AH82	East end E60 overlap
Samegrelo-Zemo Svaneti	Khobi	10	6.2	Right junction	Akhalsopeli / Khobi	Roads in Georgia (country)	
Samegrelo-Zemo Svaneti	Khobi	17	11	Crossing	Khobi	Roads in Georgia (country)	
Samegrelo-Zemo Svaneti	Khobi	26	16	Crosses Rioni River (180 m, municipality border)			
Samegrelo-Zemo Svaneti	Poti	26	16	Poti city limits			
Samegrelo-Zemo Svaneti	Poti	29	18	Right junction	Poti Sea Port	Roads in Georgia (country)	via Khobi Street
Samegrelo-Zemo Svaneti	Poti	29	18			European route E70	North end E70 overlap (and North terminus E70 route)
Samegrelo-Zemo Svaneti	Poti	31	19	Crosses Rioni Canal (375 m)			
Samegrelo-Zemo Svaneti	Poti	31.5	19.6	Crossing	Merab Kostava Street	European route E60	West end E60 overlap (E60 to port via Merab Kostava Street)
Samegrelo-Zemo Svaneti	Poti	41	25	Poti city limits			
Guria	Lanchkhuti	46	29	Left junction	Samtredia / Tbilisi	S12 highway (Georgia) European route E692	
Guria	Lanchkhuti	47	29	Crosses Supsa River (275 m)			
Guria	Lanchkhuti	Section km 47-61 construction new expressway between S12 and Kobuleti Bypass ongoing					
Guria	Lanchkhuti	55	34	Crossing	Ozurgeti	Roads in Georgia (country)	
Guria	Lanchkhuti	62	39	Two-lane expressway (Kobuleti Bypass)			
Guria	Lanchkhuti	62	39	Exit	Kobuleti / Natanebi	Roads in Georgia (country)	
Guria	Lanchkhuti	63	39	Crosses Natanebi River (190 m)			
Guria	Lanchkhuti	65	40	Exit	Kobuleti / Natanebi	Roads in Georgia (country)	
Guria	Lanchkhuti	66	41	Crosses Choloki River (80 m, region boundary)			
Adjara	Kobuleti	74	46	Exit	Kobuleti / Ozurgeti	Roads in Georgia (country)	
Adjara	Kobuleti	77	48	Exit	Khutsubani / Kobuleti		Southbound exit and entrance only
Adjara	Kobuleti	78	48	Crosses Kintrishi River (135m)			
Adjara	Kobuleti	79	49	Exit	Kvirike / Kobuleti		Northbound exit and entrance only
Adjara	Kobuleti	81	50	Crosses Dekhva River (460 m)			
Adjara	Kobuleti	85	53	Tunnel (300 m)			
Adjara	Kobuleti	88	55	Crosses Chakvistkali and Zkvistskali River (900 m)			
Adjara	Kobuleti	90	56	Exit	Chakvi		Old S2 route prior to Kobuleti Bypass
Adjara	Kobuleti	90	56	Exit	Chakvi		Chakvi-Makhinjauri Tunnel Bypass (old S2 prior to 2005 tunnel opening)
Adjara	Batumi	91	57	Chakvi-Makhinjauri Tunnel (2x2 lanes) (650 m)			
Adjara	Batumi	92	57	Expressway (Kobuleti Bypass)			
Adjara	Batumi	Section km 92-109 construction new Batumi Bypass expressway ongoing					
Adjara	Batumi	93	58	Left junction			Chakvi-Makhinjauri Tunnel Bypass (old S2 prior to 2005 tunnel opening)
Adjara	Batumi	96	60	Batumi city limits			
Adjara	Batumi	105	65	Roundabout	Khulo / Adigeni / Akhaltsikhe	Roads in Georgia (country)	
Adjara	Batumi	107	66	Roundabout	Batumi Airport		
Adjara	Batumi	108	67	Batumi city limits			
Adjara	Batumi	109	68	Crosses Chorokhi River (450 m)			
Adjara	Khelvachauri	119	74	(Turkey) Turkish border checkpoint. Road continues as to Trabzon. South end E70 overlap.			
Concurrency terminus; Incomplete access; Unopened
