= Battle of Choloki (1918) =

WWI battle in the Caucasus

Coordinates: 41.8907°N 41.8207°E

- Part of the Caucasus campaign of World War I
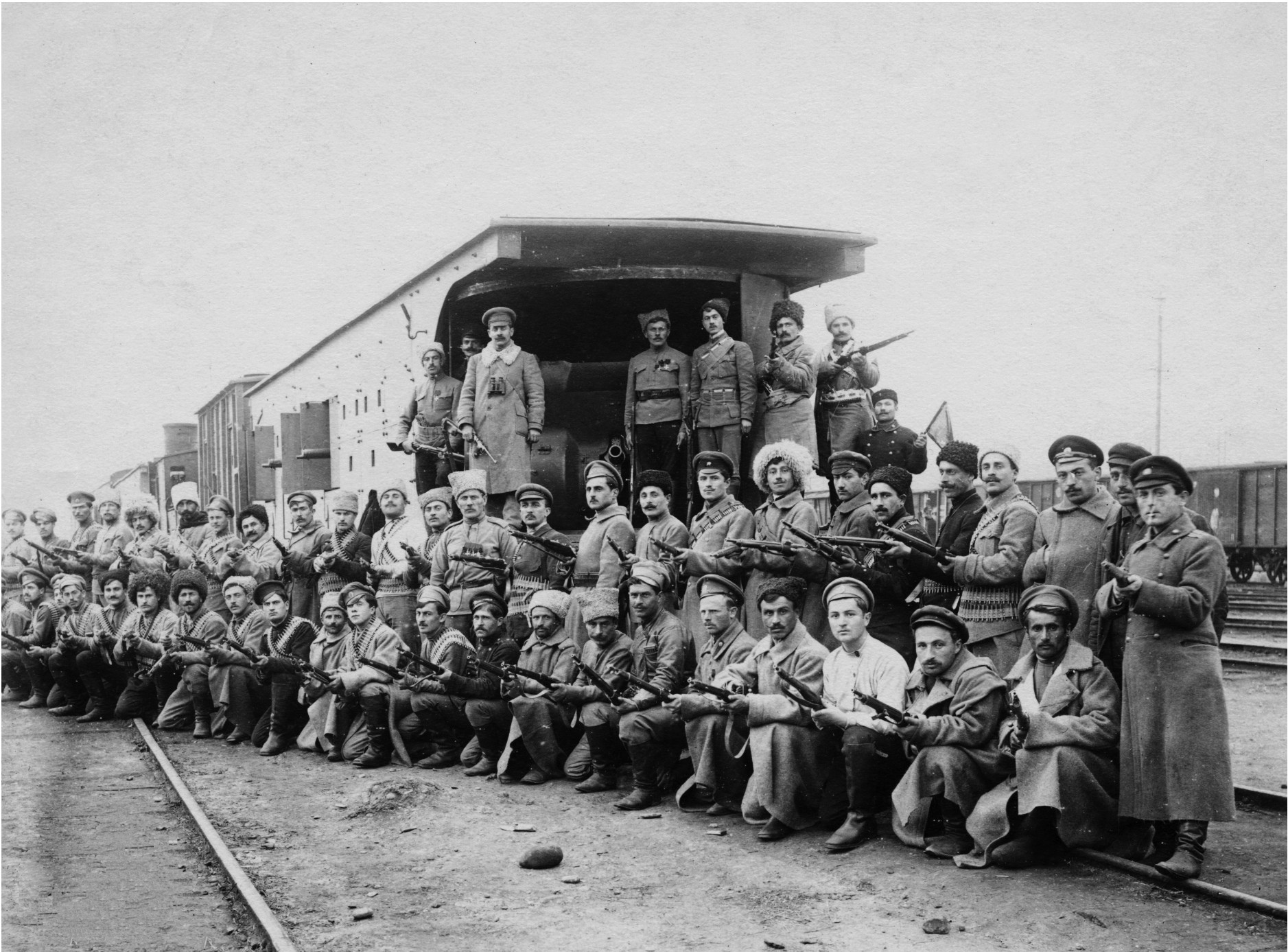
- Georgian soldiers standing at their armored train.
Date	8 April 1918
Location	Choloki
Result	Transcaucasian victory

Belligerents
(Transcaucasian Democratic Federative Republic) Transcaucasian Commissariat	Ottoman Empire

Commanders and leaders
(Transcaucasian Democratic Federative Republic) Giorgi Mazniashvili	(Ottoman Empire) Wehib Pasha

Strength
Armored train with 90 Georgian troops 4 machine guns 6 artillery pieces 400 People's Guard troops as reinforcements	Several thousand Ottoman troops

Casualties and losses
4 killed 25 wounded	at least 80, possibly hundreds killed 600 wounded 2 prisoners 20 guns

The Battle of Choloki was a battle between the Ottoman Empire and Transcaucasian troops on the Caucasian front of the World War I.

== Background ==
On March 3, 1918, between Soviet Russia and Germany, Austria-Hungary, Ottomans and Bulgaria, the Brest-Litovsk Armistice Agreement was signed, according to which Russia withdrew from the World War I. According to the truce, Russia had to give Batumi and Kars districts to the Ottoman Empire. At that time Transcaucasia was actually independent from the RSFSR and was governed by Transcaucasia Seim and Transcaucasia Commissariat, although it had not declared independence. The Ottoman Empire demanded the surrender of the territories belonging to the Treaty of Brest-Litovsk from the Transcaucasian government as well. The Seim tried to solve the problem with Ottomans through diplomatic means. For this purpose, the Trebizond Peace Conference was started on March 12, 1918. The negotiation did not have a positive result. In parallel with the negotiations, the Ottoman army started military operations to occupy the disputed territories.

== Combat operations until the 6th of April ==
In March, the 9th, 6th and 3rd Ottoman armies under the command of Mehmed Vehib Pasha attacked the Caucasus. On March 31, 1918, the Ottomans captured Batumi. The Georgian 4th Infantry Brigade under Commander Tsereteli stationed in the city withdrew to Ozurgeti, and the 2nd Infantry Brigade under Colonel Karalashvili withdrew to Chakvi. The Chairman of the National Council of Georgia, Noe Zhordania, instructed General Mazniashvili to immediately deploy to Natanebi Station close to the Black Sea coast and prevent the Ottomans from advancing to the Choloki River. Mazniashvili took over as Chief of Staff on April 1.

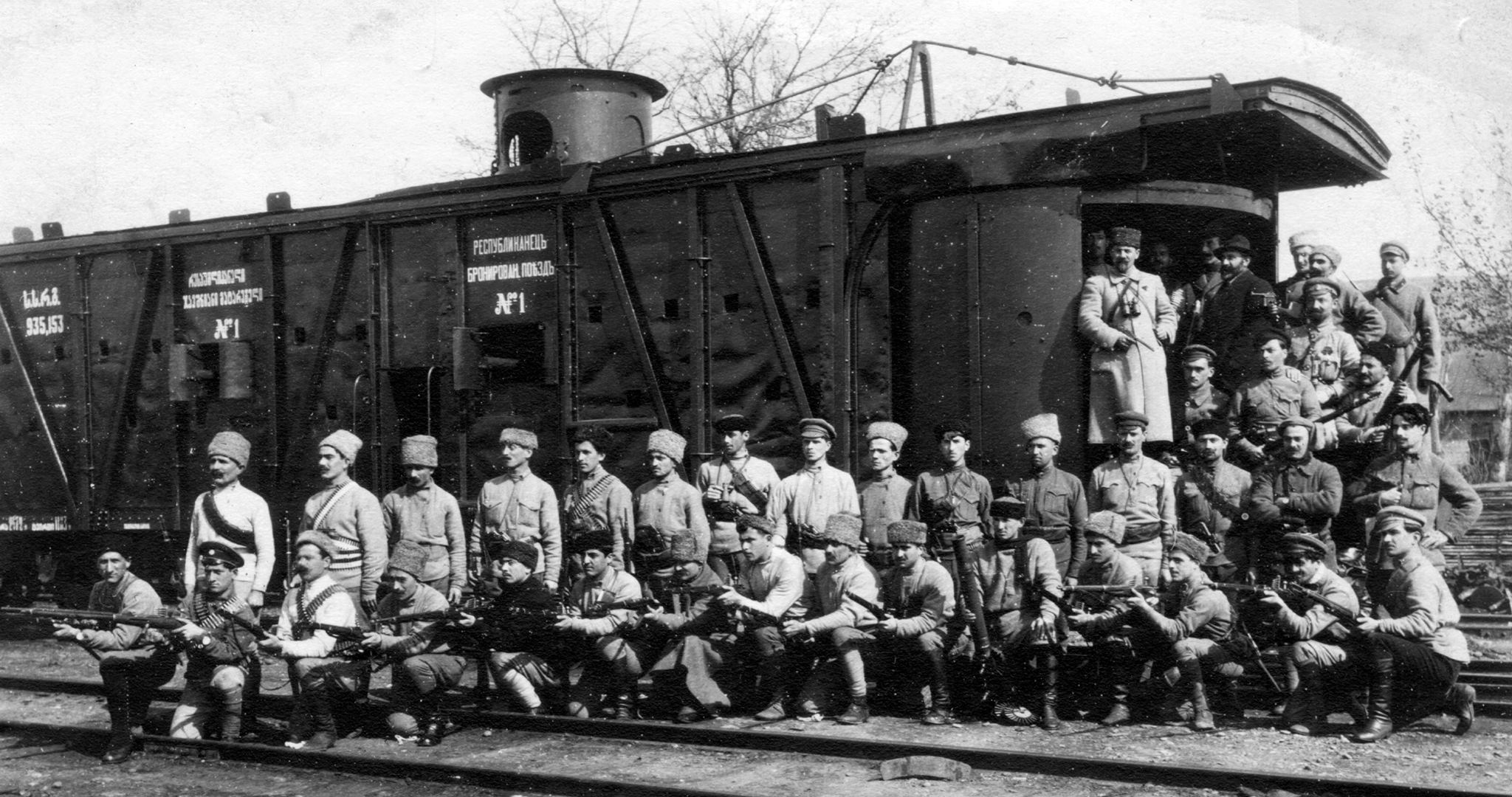
Georgian armored train

On April 2, Mazniashvili sent an armored train to Chakvi to relieve the besieged 2nd Infantry Brigade, which was cut off by the Ottomans and expecting capture. Ottoman infantry was fortified east of Kobuleti, along the railway, while 1,000 Turkish cavalrymen were stationed at Chakvi Railway Station. The armored train group arrived at the station at 9 o'clock in the morning, surprising and beating the Ottomans entrenched there, with machine gun fire. Karalashvili's brigade took advantage of this development and was able to retreat with few casualties. What remained of that force however, now numbering only 500 soldiers, was depleted and demoralized, so Mazniashvili ordered it to Lanchkhuti, in order to refill its ranks with volunteers. He divided the 4th Infantry Brigade into four regiments and distributed them to Likhauri, Shemokmedi, Vashnari and Ozurgeti. At the Supsa station there was a horse battery under the command of Poruchiki Karaev. Mazniashvili had 4 machine guns, 6 guns, an armored train with 90 soldiers and 400 People's Guard volunteers at his disposal at the time.

The front line started from the port of Shekvetili and continued to the village of Shemokmedi. It was bordered by the Black Sea on the right, and the Adjara-Guria mountains on the left. Along the entire length, from the sea to Ozurgeti, the banks of the Choloki and Natanebi rivers were almost impassable for the army. Only locals who knew the paths could go there. This section had only two exits: Railway bridges over Natanebi and Choloki and a cart-road through Likhauri to Ozurgeti. Mazniashvili started replenishing the army with local volunteers. He was aided by one of the Menshevik leaders, Isidore Ramishvili. In the countryside, almost everyone owned a gun and rifles were needed to arm the troops.

Noe Zhordania in Natanebi, giving emotional speech to the soldiers.

On April 3, an armored train was derailed south of Choloki. A detachment of Georgian scouts responded, killing two of the attackers and capturing several weapons. On April 4, the Ottomans seized Kobuleti. Capturing one officer and several wounded. The Ottomans then withdrew. Georgian officials Noe Zhordania, Irakli Tsereteli, Vlasa Mgeladze and others came to encourage the fighters in Natanebi. On April 5, at eight o'clock in the evening, the Georgian side received intelligence that a relatively small part of the Ottoman Gallipoli 2nd Division was moving towards Ozurgeti with cart-road and a larger part, 7,000 soldiers, along the railway towards Natanebi. The Ottomans laid a barricade on the railway bridge of the Ochkhamuri river, which confirmed that they were going to launch the main assault from that direction. By blockading the railway, they hoped to leave the Georgian armored trains inoperable. Mazniashvili force however managed to lay an improvised railway connection from Choloki bridge into the forest within a single day. In the evening of April 6, the Ottomans conducted artillery strikes in preparation for their attack.

== Battle at the Choloki bridge ==
On April 8, the Ottoman force passed Ochkhamuri, but did not march through the valley, instead took refuge in the forest between Ochkhamuri and Choloki. Mazniashvili ordered the armored group to retire. It was initially to remain in the rearguard, but then he shared the plan of Vladimir Goguadze, who was in charge of the train: to break into the enemy positions and conduct battle. Fighting began at five o'clock in the morning on April 7, when the armored train drove into their ranks. The Georgian soldiers inside the wagons and in the trenches were instructed to not return fire and hold fire. Only Kargaretlis field guns further away started shelling enemy positions.

When the unsuspecting Ottoman soldiers finally approached the train, The Georgian crew inside deployed their weapons, including machine guns and cannons that were concealed in the wagons, and opened fire from the train, followed by the troops hidden in the nearby trenches. Taken by surprise, the Ottoman soldiers found in the open field were killed and wounded in large numbers. At 11 o'clock, six hours into the battle, the Ottomans hit the train with a drag freight at full speed and threw the first armored wagon off the tracks. Another assault was carried out from the western direction, by a fresh Ottoman regiment. Goguadze had run out of ammunition and options and decided to detonate a mine that would destroy the train, leaving the enemy with only a wreck. However that plan was foiled by damaged wires. In the meantime, Akaki Urushadze, who was sent to ask for additional help, brought word to Mazniashvili, who deployed the 400-man detachment of the Gori People's Guard, to join the battle from the flank. Caught in a pincer, the Ottomans began to give ground and eventually fell back. The rest of the Georgian force advanced from their trenches and reached the retreating enemy at the bridge of Ochkhamuri before 4 o'clock in the day.

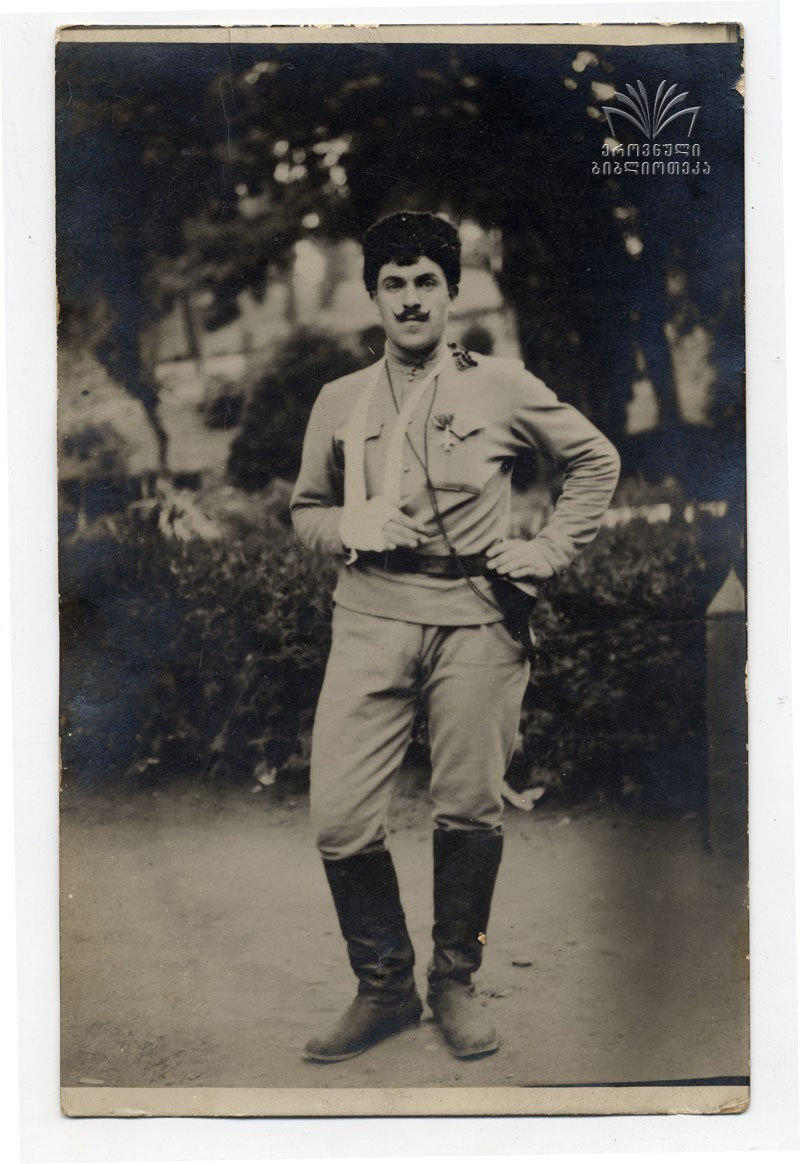
Porfile Gorgoshidze

The remaining Ottoman force retreated four kilometers from the engagement. In the battle, 3 people were killed and 25 wounded on the Georgian side. The Ottomans reportedly suffered hundreds of casualties. According to Mazniashvili's estimate, up to 500 people were killed in the fight, and according to other Georgian military leaders, up to 1000 people were killed. According to Dr. Vakhtang Gambashidze, the Ottomans were transporting 600 wounded soldiers to Batumi. According to "Georgia" newspaper, 80 were killed on the Ottoman side, 2 soldiers were captured, along with 20 guns.

Many locals showed heroism in the battle: Aleksandre Gorgoshidze and Porfile Gorgoshidze were awarded the George Cross for their heroism in battle; Heroism was shown by the chief conductor Simon Skamkochaishvili, according to the story, the soldier Bolkvadze, who went on reconnaissance, was suddenly attacked by a group of Ottoman soldiers, killed 4 and took 4 prisoners. On April 13, 1918, Vladimir Goguadze became the first Georgian to receive the title of national hero.

== Results ==
The success achieved at the Choloki bridge was overshadowed by other units of the Georgian army. A small army of Ottomans (one brigade with artillery) marched towards Ozurgeti, a thousand people camped in Likhauri did not resist, left their positions and retreated towards the city. This caused a panic, the army and state institutions left Ozurgeti and began to retreat towards Chokhatauri and the Ottomans freely occupied the abandoned city. In addition to Ozurgeti, the Ottomans took Chanieti, Likhauri, Makvaneti, Tsilimta, part of Melekeduri, and advanced in the direction of Vashnari. They attacked Shekari from Gakiruli, but they could not enter Shekari due to the resistance of the population. Mazniashvili managed to place the reserve army in Lanchkhuti at the Nasakiral pass and block the Chokhatauri road. On April 11, Mazniashvila tried to attack Ozurgeti and the Battle of Vashnari took place, but in the end the military actions were stopped by German diplomatic intervention and a temporary truce. The Ottomans left Ozurgeti according to the terms of the truce on June 7.

== Literature ==
- Sharadze, G., "Return", Vol. III, Tbilisi: "Science", 1992. — p. 438-446.
- Mazniashvili, G., "Memories: 1917-1925", Tbilisi: State Publishing House, 1927. — p. 22-57.
