= European route E692 =

Road in trans-European E-road network

E692

Route information
- Length: 57 km (35 mi)

Major junctions
- From: Grigoleti
- To: Samtredia

Location
- Countries: Georgia

Highway system
- International E-road network; A Class; B Class

European route E 692 is a European B class road in Georgia, connecting the E 60 and E 70 roads, bypassing the Black Sea city of Poti. The E 692 is officially listed between the cities of Batumi and Samtredia, and is part of the East-West Highway project in Georgia, a major investment into Georgia's international road connectivity. In the context of that project the entire 57 km S12 highway in the E 692 will be upgraded to motorway standards.

== Route ==
- Georgia (country)
  - / ს 12: Grigoleti ( E70 E97) - Lanchuti - Samtredia ( E60)
