= Pichvnari =

Ancient Colchian settlement

Coordinates: 41°53′36″N 41°46′30″E

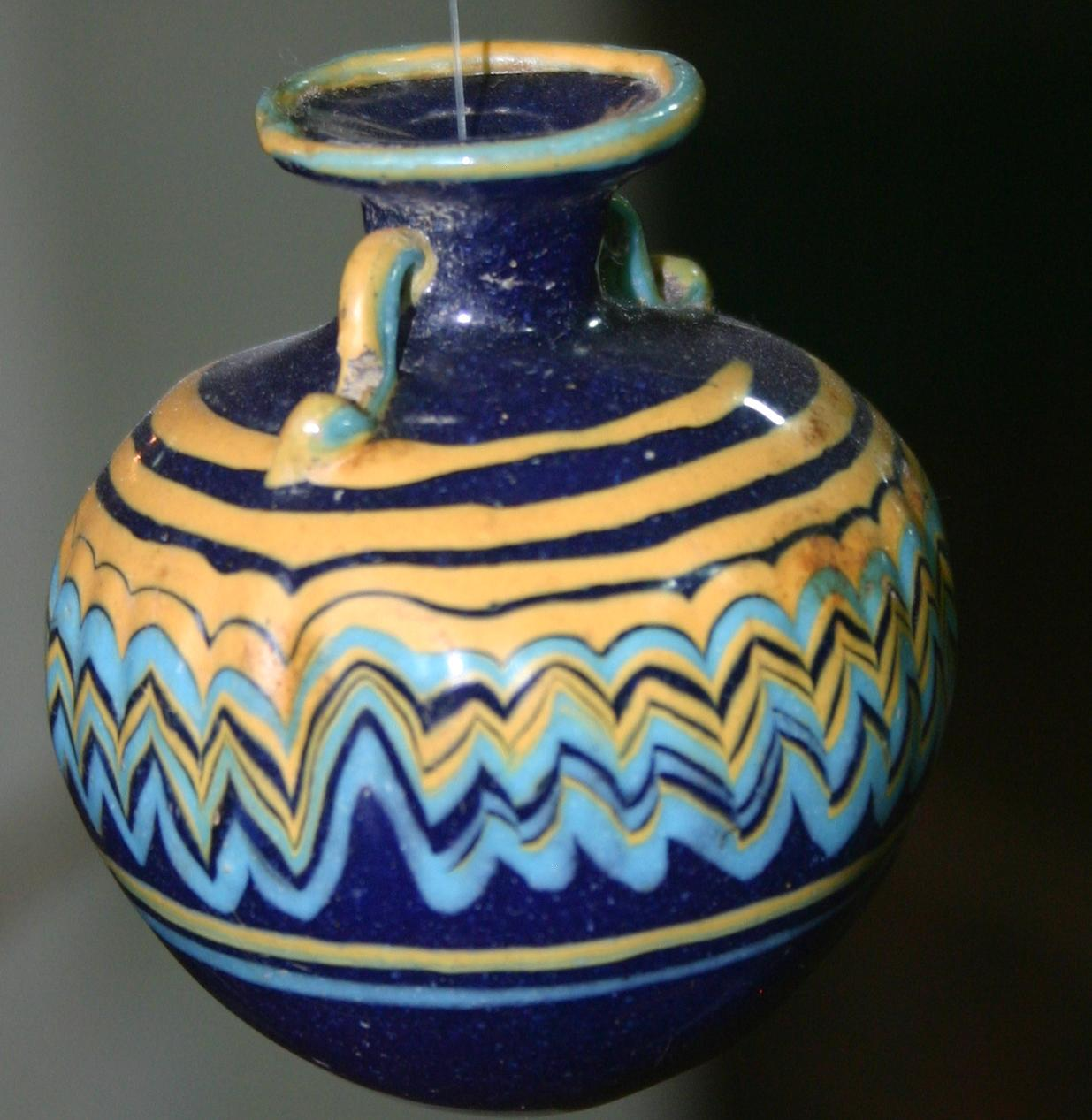
Polychrome glass perfume jar

Pichvnari (Georgian: ფიჭვნარი, also transliterated as Pičvnari) is the site of a Colchian settlement; its ancient name is unknown. It is within modern Georgia, on the coast at the confluence of the Choloki and Ochkhamuri rivers, about 10 kilometres north of the seaside resort of Kobuleti.

Excavations restarted in 1998 as an Anglo-Georgian collaborative effort (British-Georgian Pichvnari Expedition of Pichvnari) between the Batumi Archaeological Museum, the N. Berdzenishvili Batumi Research Institute and the Ashmolean Museum of Oxford University.

A multilevel Bronze Age settlement of Pichori is located on the coast north of Pichvnari.

== See also ==
- Iranian Kohl-Tube from Pichvnari
