= Ozurgeti, Ozurgeti Municipality =

Town in Guria, Georgia

Ozurgeti ოზურგეთი
- Village
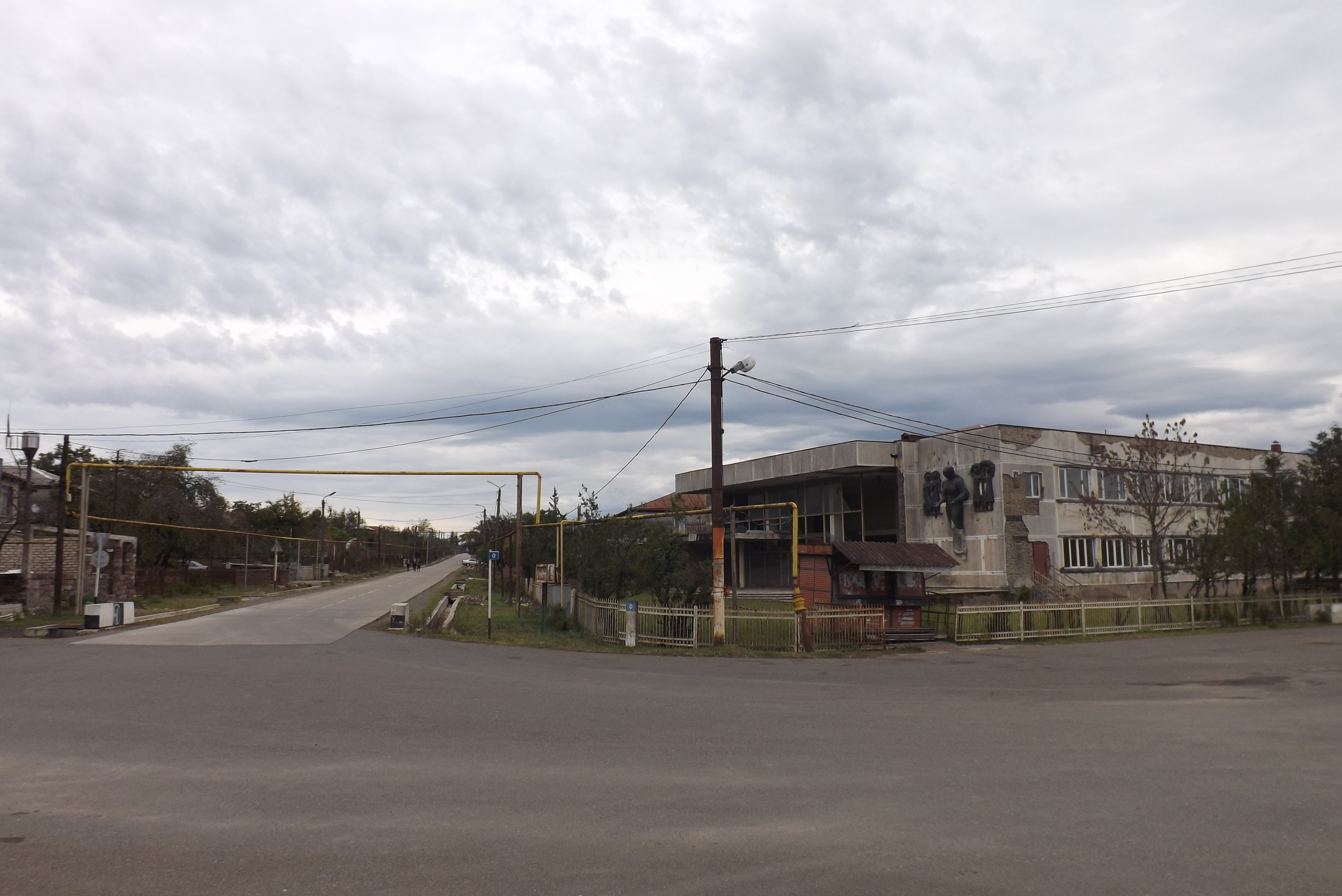

- Location within Georgia Location within Guria
- Coordinates: 41°56′26″N 41°59′26″E
- Country: Georgia
- Mkhare: Guria
- Municipality: Ozurgeti
- Elevation: 80 m (260 ft)

Population (2014)
  - Total: 1,388
- Time zone: UTC+4 (Georgian Time)

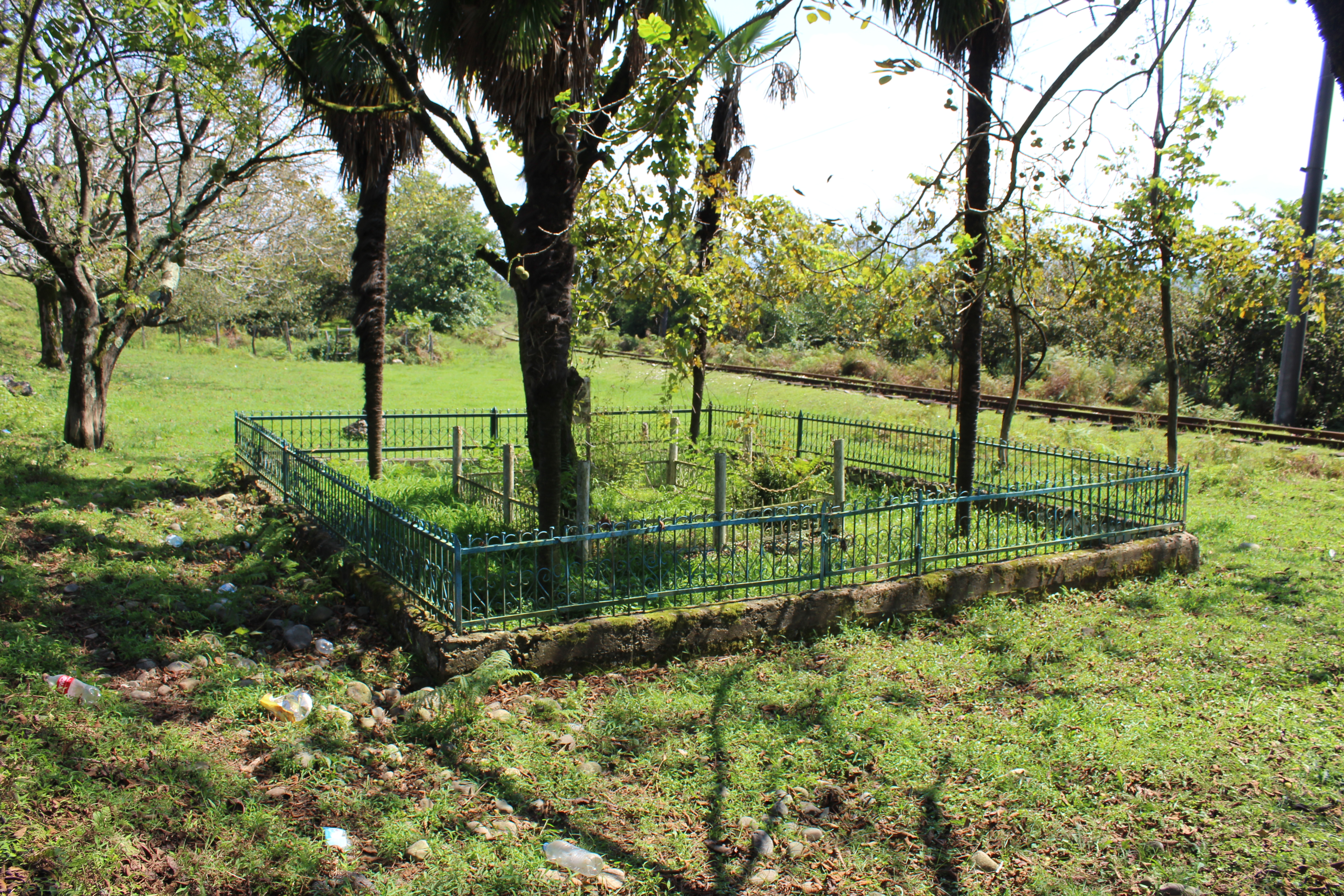
Grave of Ottoman soldiers from 1918 battle.

Ozurgeti (Georgian: ოზურგეთი) is a village in the Ozurgeti Municipality of Guria in western Georgia. It is located on the Natenebi River, 2 kilometres from the city Ozurgeti. On 11 April 1918, a small battle was fought there between the Ottoman Empire and the Transcaucasian Commissariat. A cemetery for the Ottoman soldiers is located in the village. From 1930 until 1989, the village was named Makharadze in honour of Filipp Makharadze, a Georgian Bolshevik.
