= S12 highway (Georgia) =

Trunk road in Georgia

S12
- საერთაშორისო 12
- Samtredia-Lanchkhuti-Grigoleti

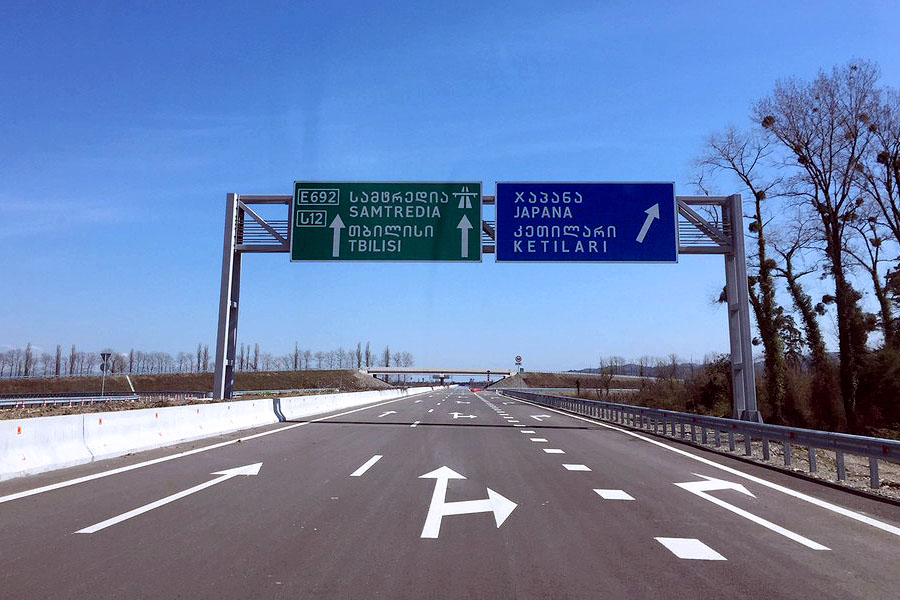
- S12 as motorway

Route information
- Part of
- Length: 56.2 km (34.9 mi)
- Existed: 1996–present

Major junctions
- East end: Samtredia
- West end: Grigoleti

Location
- Georgia
- Municipalities: Samtredia, Lanchkhuti

Highway system
- Roads in Georgia; International Routes; National Routes

The Georgian highway S12 (Georgian: საერთაშორისო მნიშვნელობის გზა ს12, Saertashoriso mnishvnelobis gza S12, road of international importance), also known as Samtredia-Lanchkhuti-Grigoleti, is a 56 kilometres (35 mi) long "road of international importance" within the Georgian road network.

== Background ==
The S12 was assigned to the route in 1996, when the current Georgian classification system was adopted and the "roads of international importance" (S-)category was introduced. Initially the S12 was recorded as the 56 kilometres (35 mi) "S12 Samtredia-Lanchkhuti-Ureki", but in later years the west terminus of the road was moved one kilometer to Grigoleti.

The highway branches of the S1 highway in Samtredia and runs through the Guria region to the S2 highway near Grigoleti at the Black Sea coast. The highway is part of the main route between Tbilisi and Batumi. In the European E-road network the highway has been assigned with the number E692.

=== Upgrade to motorway ===
After initial surveys and securing financial support since 2009, the project was divided in four sections. To bypass villages and towns, the S12 highway was newly built and realigned up to a few km north, shortening the highway to 51.5 kilometres (32.0 mi).

The European Union supported the project with a European Investment Bank loan and a grant. The S12 upgrade was part of the East-West Highway project to create an international (east-west) transport corridor through Georgia, connecting Azerbaijan and Armenia with Turkey. The project included motorway upgrades of the S1 between Tbilisi and Samtredia, the S2 between Grigoleti and the Turkish border at Sarpi (part motorway, part single carriageway), the S4 between Rustavi and the Azerbaijani border (motorway), and the S7 to the Armenian border (motorway).

The new motorway gradually opened since 2020, amidst various delays. The first 14 kilometres (8.7 mi) of Lot 2 between Japana and Lanchkhuti opened in the summer of 2020. By December 2025, most of the highway was finished.

== Photos ==
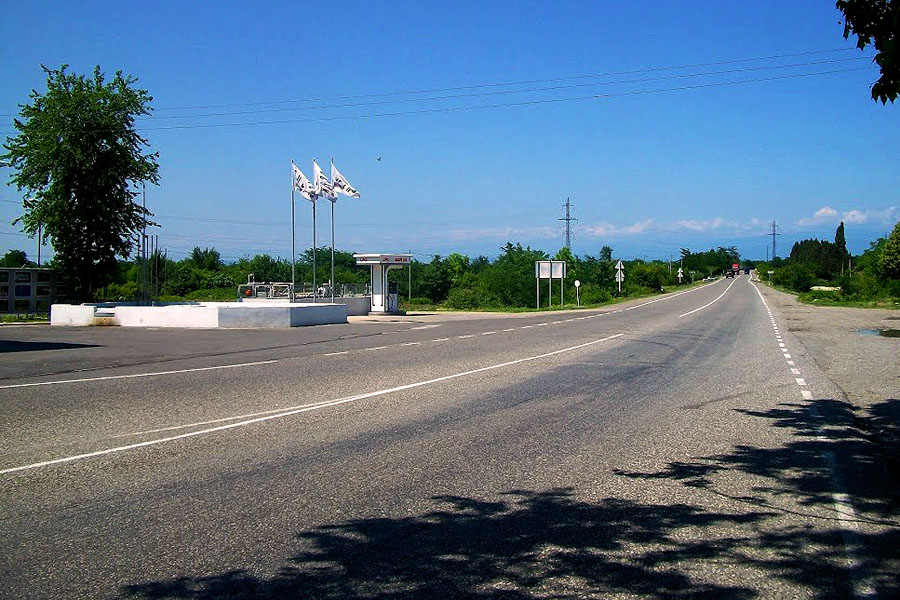
S12 highway at Dafnari

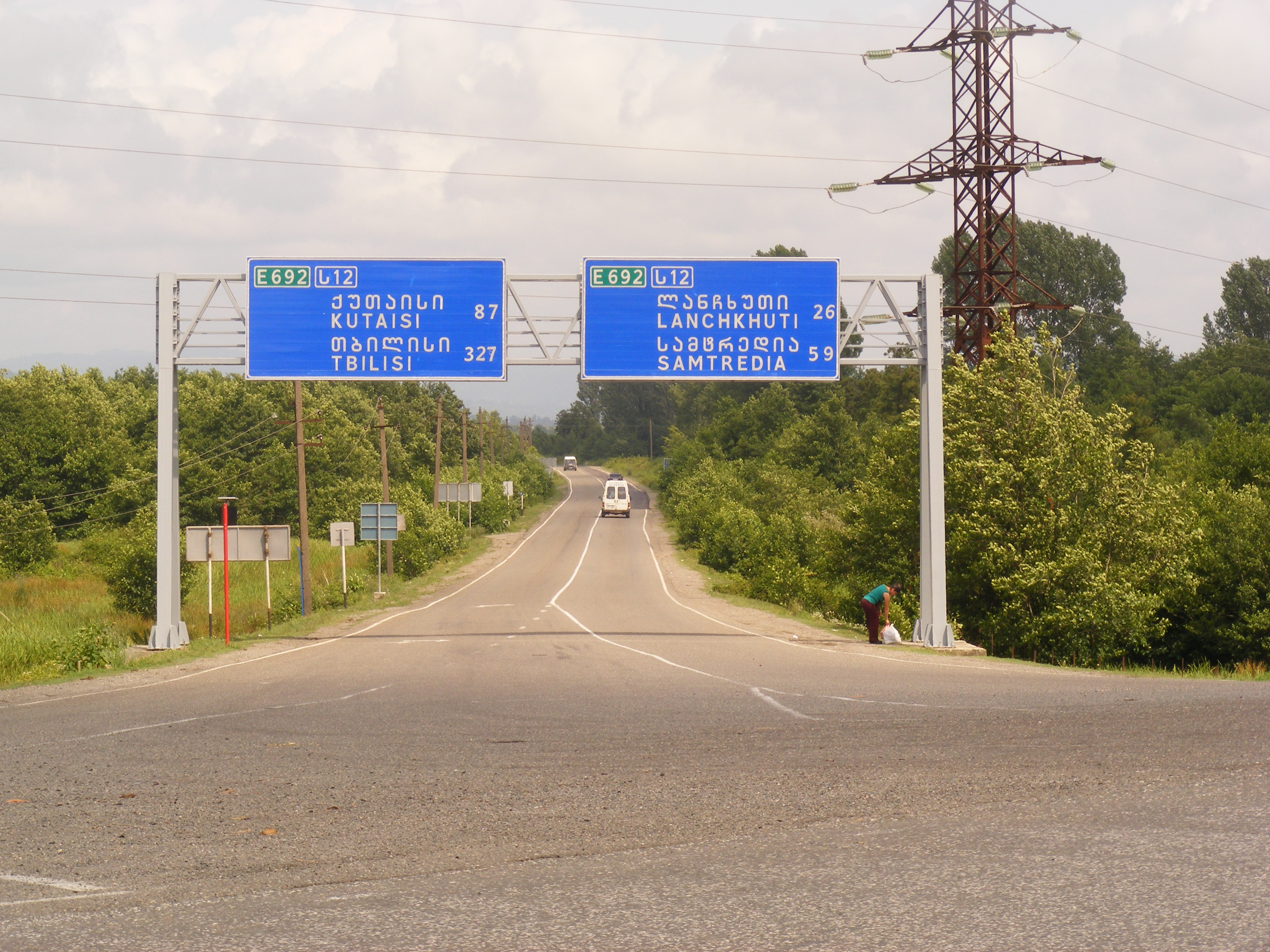
West terminus at Grigoleti

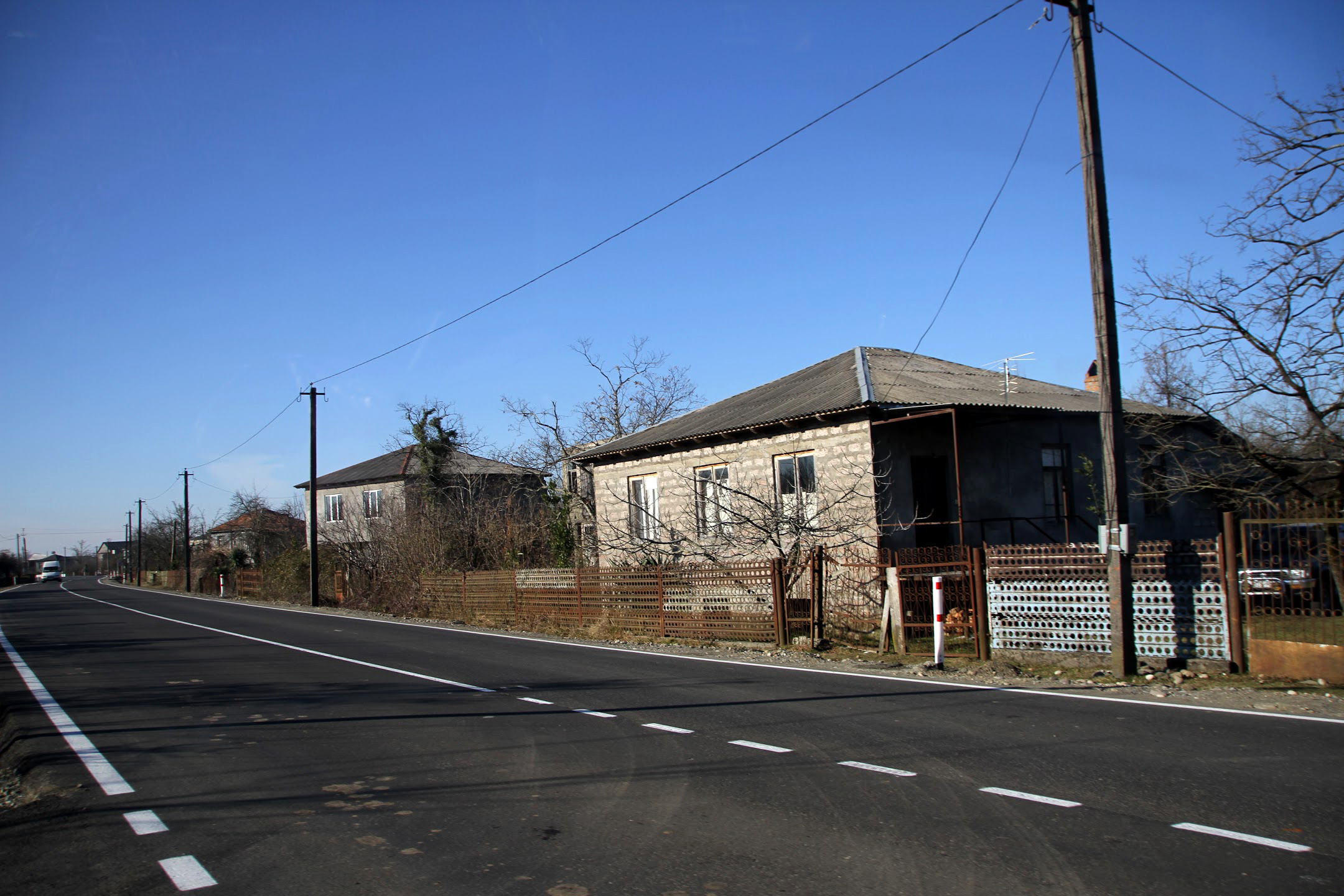
Former S12 through Supsa
