= Iranian Kohl-Tube from Pichvnari =

5th-century Iranian kohl-tube

The Iranian Kohl-Tube from Pichvnari was excavated amongst grave goods at the 5th century BC Greek cemetery at Pichvnari in present-day western Georgia (ancient Colchis). This specific kohl-tube, a polychrome glass perfume vessel wherein kohl (cosmetic for eyelids) was kept, dates to the Achaemenid era. The item is identified as "Burial 136, K-P-86/149". According to Amiran Kakhidze in Ancient Civilizations from Scythia to Siberia, the vessel was probably imported into western Georgia through eastern Georgia. Kakhidze bases his statement on grounds that western Georgia was more interconnected with the Greek world than the Iranian world, that kohl-tubes were alien to the Greek world, and because eastern Georgia had close connections with the Iranian world in addition to being the location of more excavated kohl-tubes. It was presumably made in what is contemporary northwestern Iran.

== Sources ==
- Kakhidze, Amiran (2007). "Iranian Glass Perfume Vessel from the Pichvnari Greek Cemetery of the Fifth Century BC". Ancient Civilizations from Scythia to Siberia. 13 (1–2): 109–115. doi:10.1163/157005707X212698.
