= Makhinjauri =

Makhinjauri მახინჯაური
- Borough
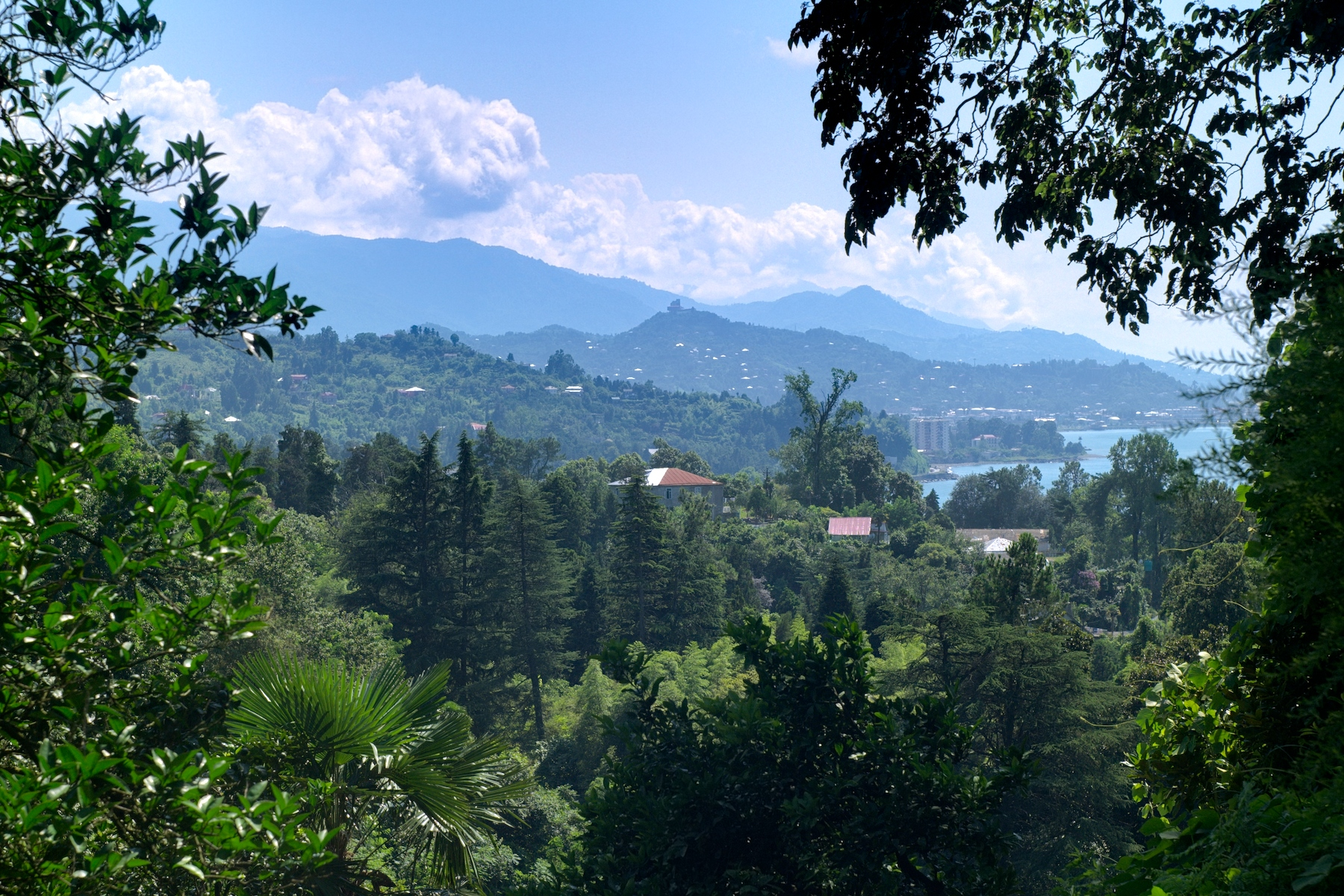
- Makhinjauri

- Location within Georgia Location within Adjara
- Coordinates: 41°40′31″N 41°41′41″E
- Country: Georgia
- Autonomous Republic: Adjara

Population (2014)
  - Total: 735
- Time zone: UTC+4 (Georgian Time)
  - Summer (DST): UTC+5

Makhinjauri (Georgian: მახინჯაური [maχindʒauri]) is a small town (daba) in Adjara, Georgia, with the population of 735 according to the 2014 census. It is located on the Black Sea coast, 5 km north of Batumi, the capital of Adjara, and functions as a seaside resort. Until the opening of Batumi railway station in 2015, Makhinjauri station was the one serving Batumi. Administratively, Makhinjauri was part of the Khelvachauri district from 1959 to 2011 and of the city of Batumi since 2011.

== Geography ==
Located within the range of 15 m to 1,300 m above sea level, Makhinjauri possesses humid subtropical climate, with warmer winters and cooler summers compared to Batumi. Makhinjauri functions as a seaside climatic spa and is part of the group of resorts on Georgia's southwestern Black Sea coast located around Batumi.

== History ==
The toponym "Makhinjauri" (also transliterated as Makhindjauri and Makhindzhauri) is derived from the Georgian word makhinji, meaning "ugly" or "mutilated". A legend holds that the area was a scene of a crackdown on Christians by the Ottoman soldiers in which several people were mutilated.

Owing to its subtropical climate and sulphur springs, the then-village Makhinjauri was developed into a resort under the Imperial Russian rule around 1904. One of the mansions built at that time and then owned by the Siberian gold magnate Alexander Sibiryakov is now in use as the rest-house Narinji. In 1906, during the revolutionary upheaval in the Caucasus, Makhinjauri was the scene of a resounding murder of the British-American diplomat William Horwood Stuart.

Under the Soviet rule, Makhinjauri was granted the status of an urban-type settlement (Georgian: daba) in 1959. It was popularized in the Georgian SSR as a health resort with the options of climatotherapy and sulphuric springs. As of the 2002 census, Makhinjauri had a population of 3,400. Starting from 2006, Makhinjauri saw its infrastructure improved and modernized. Some of the important projects were a new railway station terminal, serving to the regional capital of Batumi, and a new Chakvi-Makhinjauri motor road tunnel, which is part of the Batumi-Kobuleti tunnel complex.

== See also ==
- Adjara
