= Ochkhamuri (river) =

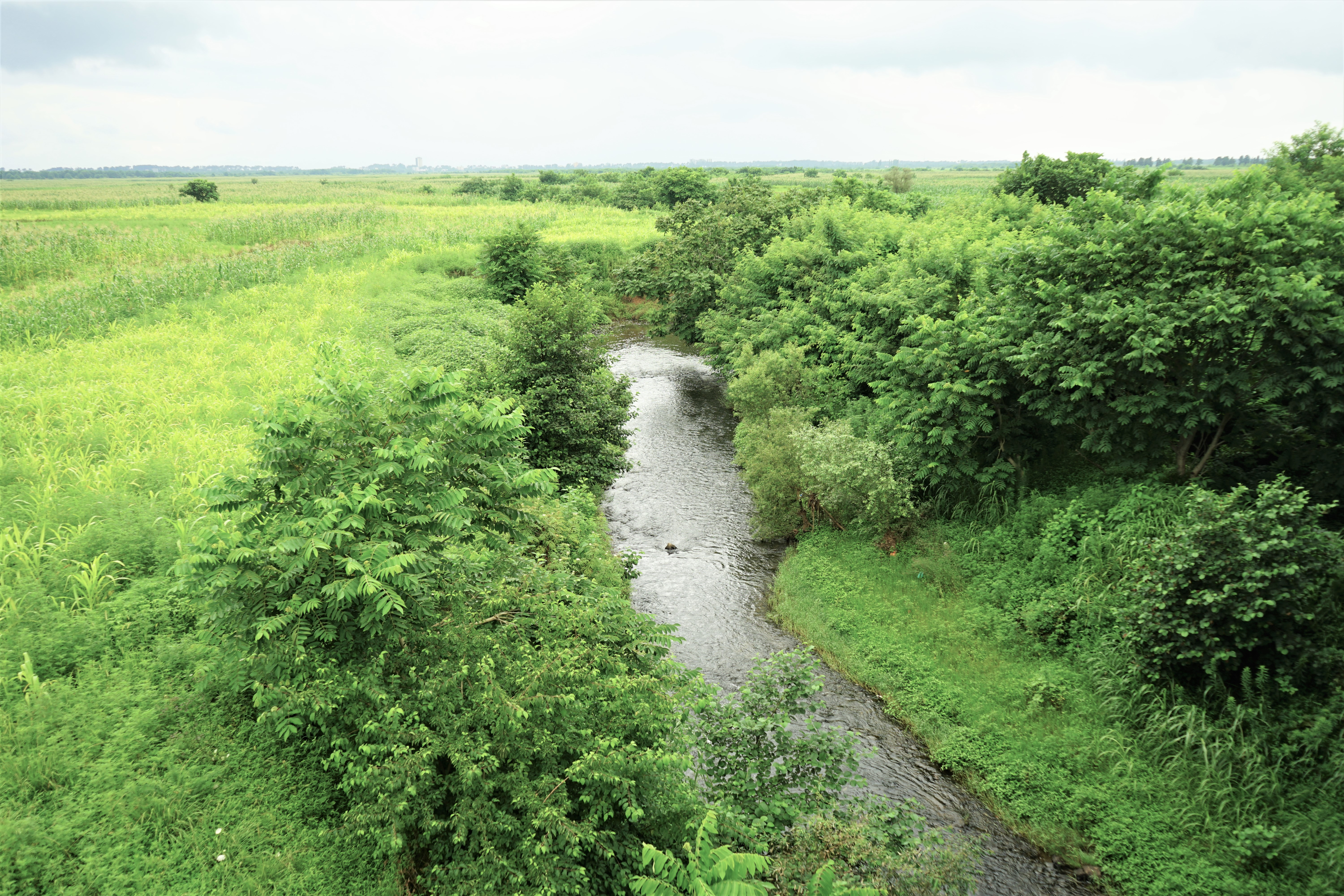

- Location within Adjara Location within Georgia
- Native name: ოჩხამური (Georgian)

Location
- Country: Georgia
- State: Adjara

Physical characteristics
- Source: Meskheti Range
- Mouth: Choloki
  - coordinates: 41.8918°N 41.7828°E
- Length: 21.4 km (13.3 mi)
- Basin size: 65.2 km2

Basin features
- Progression: Choloki→ Natanebi→ Black Sea

The Ochkhamuri (Georgian: ოჩხამური) is a river in Adjara, Georgia, a left tributary to the Choloki. Its length is 21,4 km and the area of basin is 65,2 km.^{2} The townlet of the same name is located on the banks of the river.

The archaeological complex of Pichvnari lies at the confluence of the Choloki and the Ochkhamuri, near the Black Sea coast. Both rivers flow through the area which was home to a rich Bronze Age culture of Colchis.

== See also ==
- Ochkhamuri
