= Batumi railway station =

Railway station in Georgia

Batumi Central ბათუმი ცენტრალი
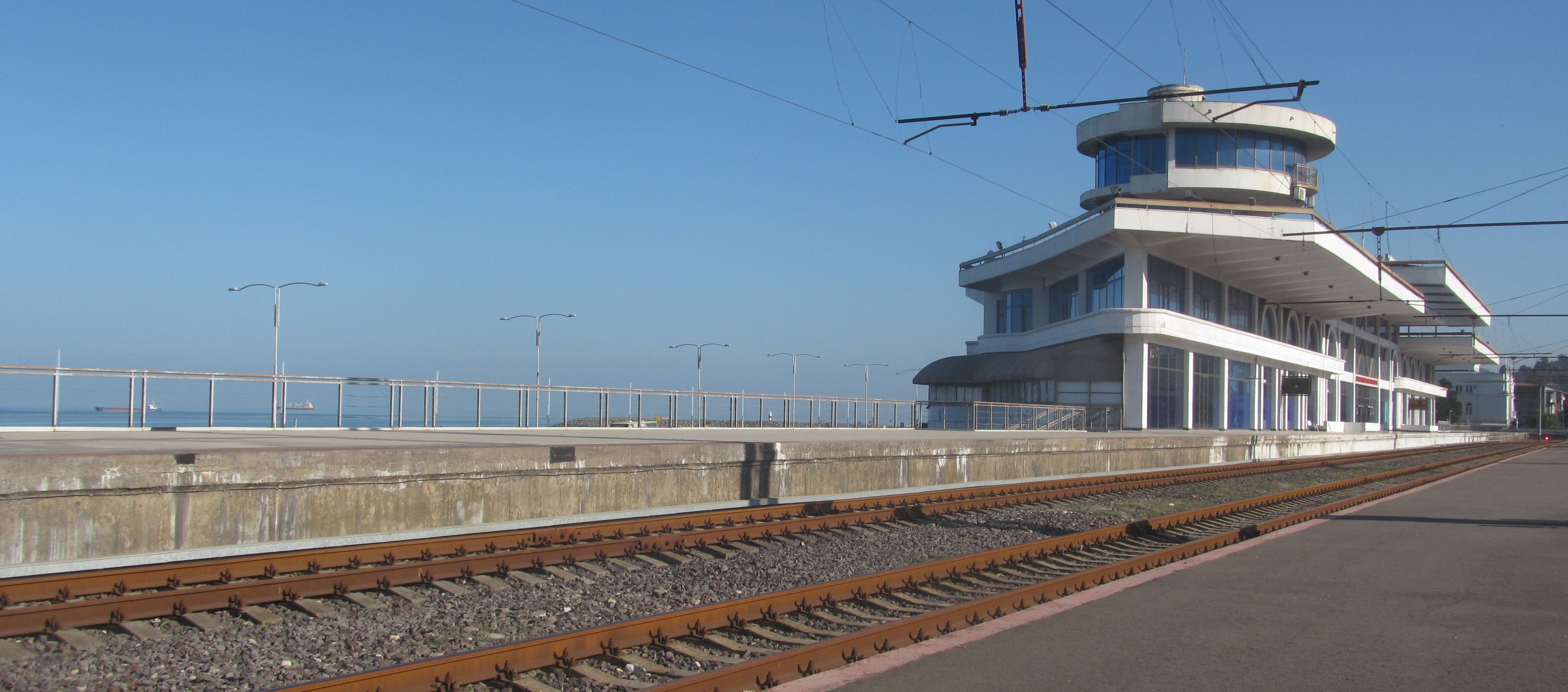

General information
- Location: Queen Tamar Highway, Batumi, Georgia
- Coordinates: 41°39′31″N 41°40′39″E
- System: Georgian Railway terminal
- Owner: Georgian Railway
- Platforms: 2
- Tracks: 7

History
- Opened: 2015
Location

Batumi Central (Georgian: ბათუმი ცენტრალი) is the railway station serving Batumi, Georgia. Despite its name, the station is located on the outskirts of the city, some 4 km away from the Old Town. The four-storey station building is combined with a bus terminal and a shopping centre, with the total floor area of 22,500 sq.m.

== History ==
Batumi station was the original terminus of the Batumi-Tiflis-Baku railway, whose construction completed in 1900. The historic railway station was located in the very centre of Batumi, on Chavchavadze st. near Batumi Cathedral of the Mother of God. It had one platform and three tracks, connected with a single-track running along Chavchavadze street to the freight station near the port, then further north-east.

In the 1990s, following the collapse of the Soviet Union, Georgian Railway was in decline, and the services to Batumi station ceased by the end of 1996. To make a better use of the lucrative land in the city centre, the tracks along Chavchavadze st. were lifted in 1999, and the line ended with a buffer stop on Mayakovsky st. The old railway station building stood abandoned until 2008, when it was taken over by TBC Bank for its main office in Batumi. When railway services to Batumi were renewed (by 1998), they terminated at Makhinjauri station, over 6 km away from Batumi city centre.

The current station was opened on 5 July 2015, and named Batumi Central to highlight its location within the city boundaries, unlike Makhinjauri station which was Batumi's only railway connection during the preceding decade.

== Services ==
As of 2018, Batumi Central has three daily long-distance services to Tbilisi railway station, as well as slower trains to Ozurgeti and Kutaisi, one daily service to each of the two.
