= Shekvetili =

Shekvetili შეკვეთილი
- Village
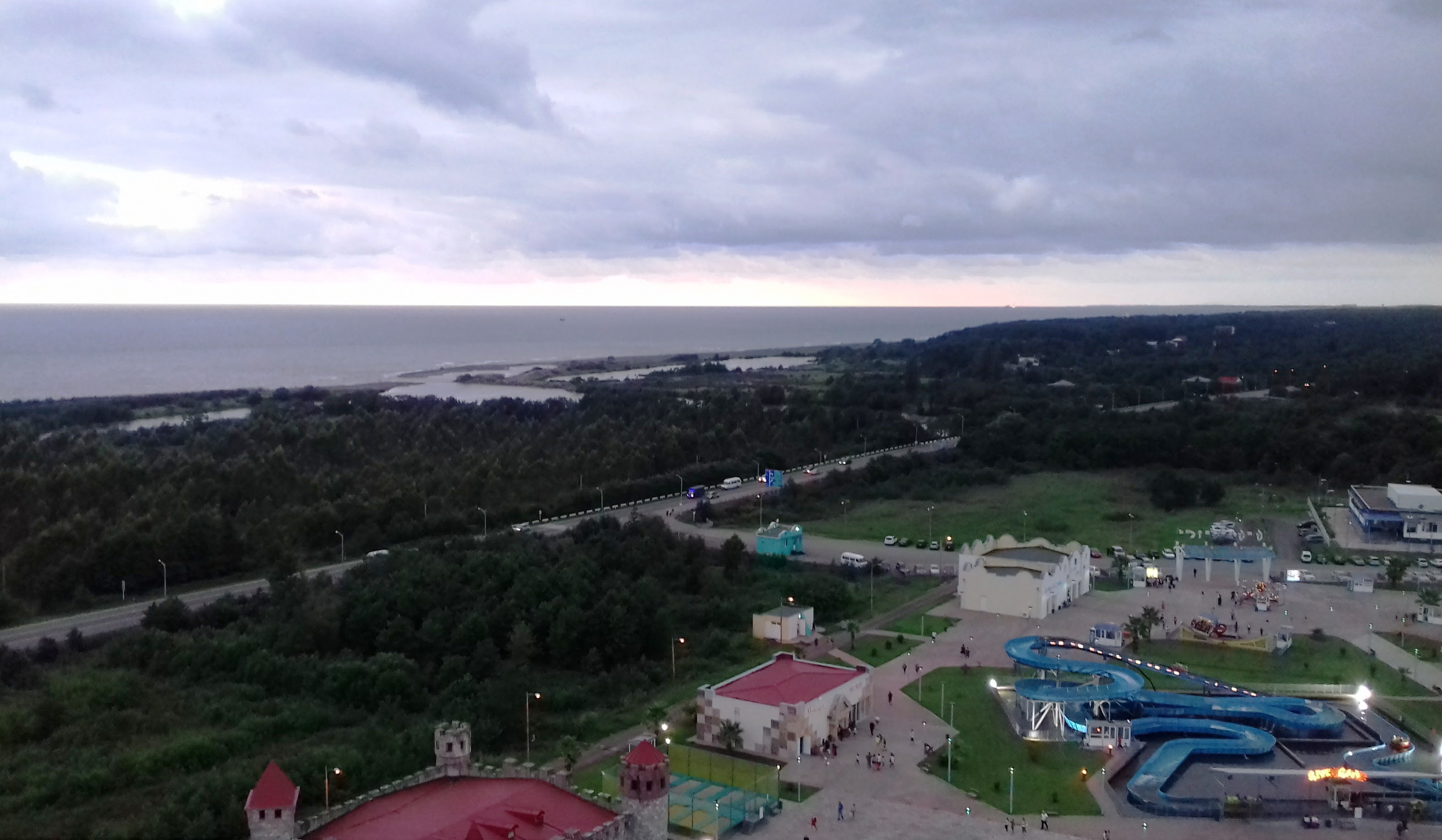
- Shekvetili Park

- Location in Georgia Shekvetili (Guria)
- Coordinates: 41°55′40″N 41°46′05″E
- Country: Georgia
- Region: Guria
- Municipality: Ozurgeti
- Elevation: 2 m (6.6 ft)

Population (2014)
  - Total: 175
- Time zone: UTC+4 (Georgian Time)

Shekvetili (Georgian: შეკვეთილი) is a village and sea resort in Ozurgeti Municipality, Guria, Georgia, located on the eastern Black Sea coast, at the mouth of the Natanebi river. Shekvetili is home to the popular amusement park Tsitsinatela, large indoor venue Black Sea Arena, the Miniature Park, an open-air exhibition of scale models of Georgia's architectural landmarks, and a dendrological park. The arboretum has been created by the Georgian politician and business oligarch Bidzina Ivanishvili, but has met with protests from environmentalists.

== Geography ==
Shekvetili is a 5 km seaside strip dominated by the forest of pine trees, at 2 m above sea level. It is located midway between the sea resorts of Ureki and Kobuleti, 21 km west of Ozurgeti, the main town of Guria. The resort is traversed by the S2 highway and is also served by the Natanebi railway station.

== History ==
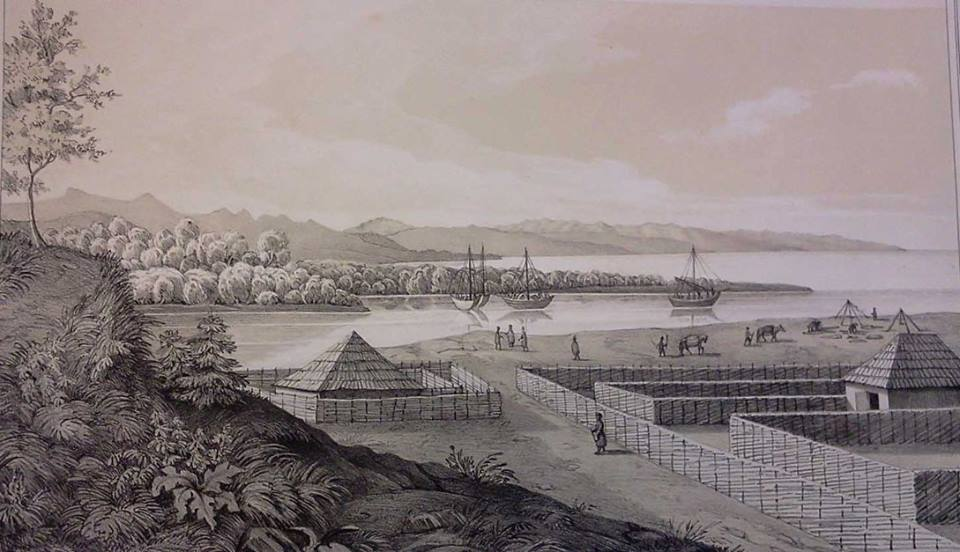
The Shekvetili Fort in the early 19th century.

Shekvetili served as an important trading locale within the southwestern Georgian Principality of Guria in the 18th century. It was occupied by an Ottoman garrison in 1723 and passed into Russian possession in the Treaty of Bucharest in 1812. The Turks referred to it as Shefketil, while to the Russians it came to be known as the Fort of St. Nicholas. According to a contemporary account, "the stores for Fort St. Nicholas are landed upon an adjoining tongue of land, and transported thither on men's shoulders."

=== Battle of Limani (1829) ===
As a frontier fortress, Shekvetili was a scene of military confrontations between the Russian and Ottoman forces in the course of the Russo-Turkish wars. During the 1828–29 conflict, the Fort of St. Nicholas was one of the bases for Russian operations into "Turkish Guria" (Adjara). On 5 March 1829, Major-General Karl Hesse at the head of a force of 1,200 Russian regulars and some 1,500 Gurian militiamen stormed and destroyed a large fortified Ottoman camp at Limani, close to Shekvetili.

=== Battle of Shekvetili (1853) ===
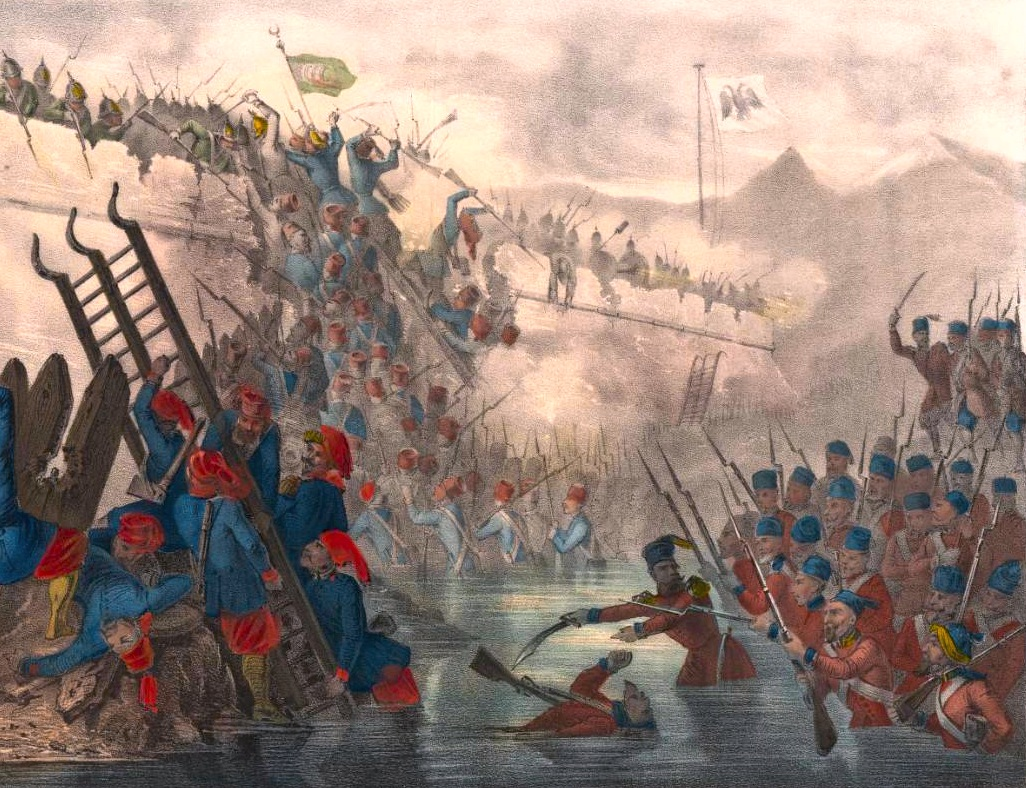
The Battle of Shekvetili (1853).

During the Crimean War, on the night of 15–16 October 1853, a superior Ottoman force of three or five battalions, including bashi-bazouks, led by Hasan and Ali Beys and Dede Ağa, natives of Çürüksu, stormed Shekvetili, held by two companies of Russian infantry and a local Georgian militia under Captain Shcherbakov, and captured the post after hours of a pitched battle. Atrocities committed by the bashi-bazouks in and around Shekvetili alienated local Muslim Georgians, who had initially welcomed the Ottoman advance. The Russian casualties amounted to nearly 1,000 killed, including Captain Shcherbakov and Georgian militia commander Prince Giorgi Gurieli, and 80 captured, while the Turks lost 32 dead and 59 wounded. The battle opened the Caucasus front of the Crimean War.
