= Ochkhamuri =

Ochkhamuri ოჩხამური
- Borough
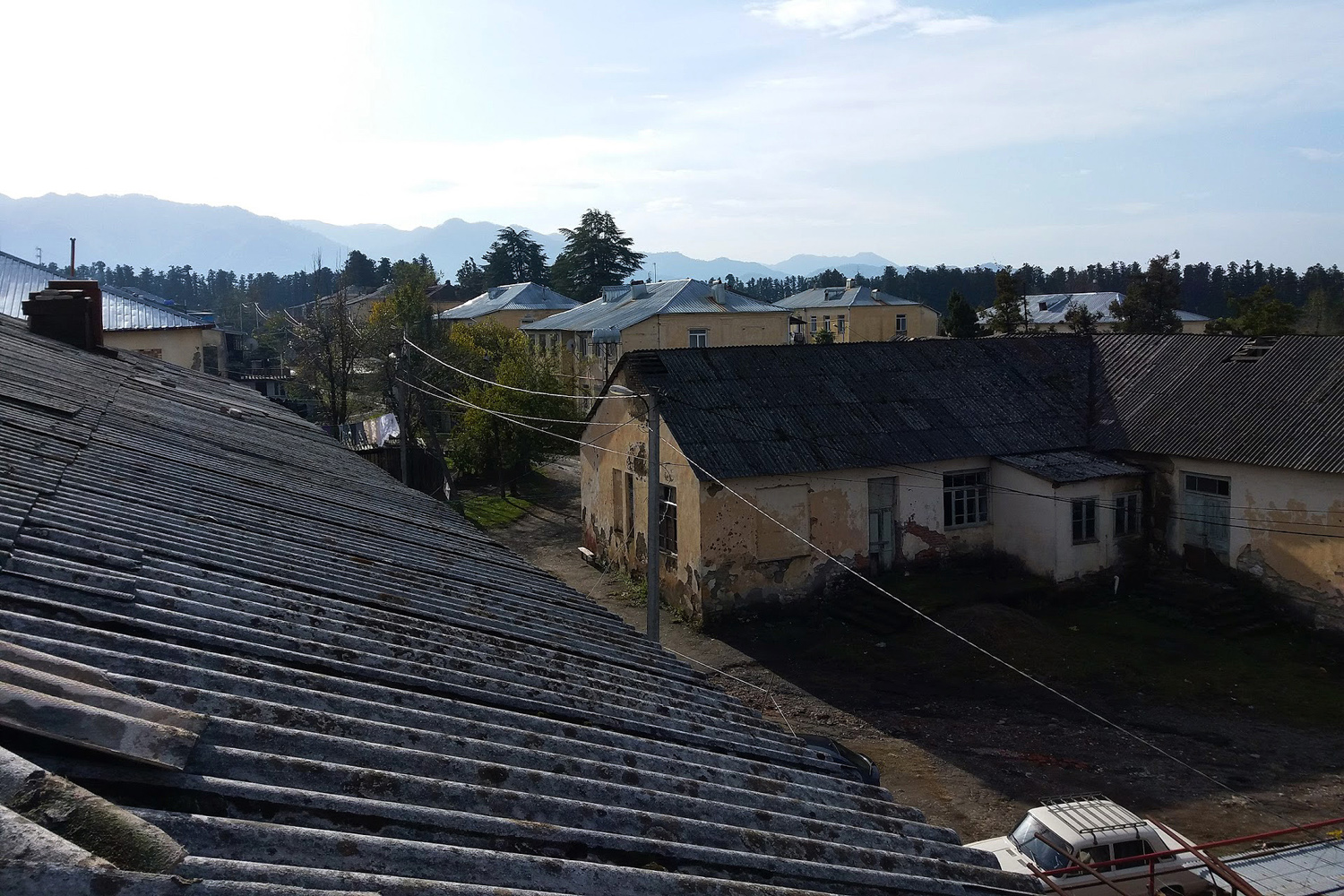
- Derelict kolkhoz houses in Ochkhamuri

- Location within Georgia Location within Adjara
- Coordinates: 41°51′19″N 41°50′10″E
- Country: Georgia
- Autonomous Republic: Adjara
- Municipality: Kobuleti
- Town from: 1954
- Elevation: 12 m (39 ft)

Population (2014)
  - Total: 5,355
- Time zone: UTC+4 (Georgian Time)

Ochkhamuri (Georgian: ოჩხამური [otʃʰχamuɾi]) is a small town (daba) on the Ochkhamuri river in Adjara, Georgia, with a population of 5,355 as of the Georgian census of 2014.

== Geography ==
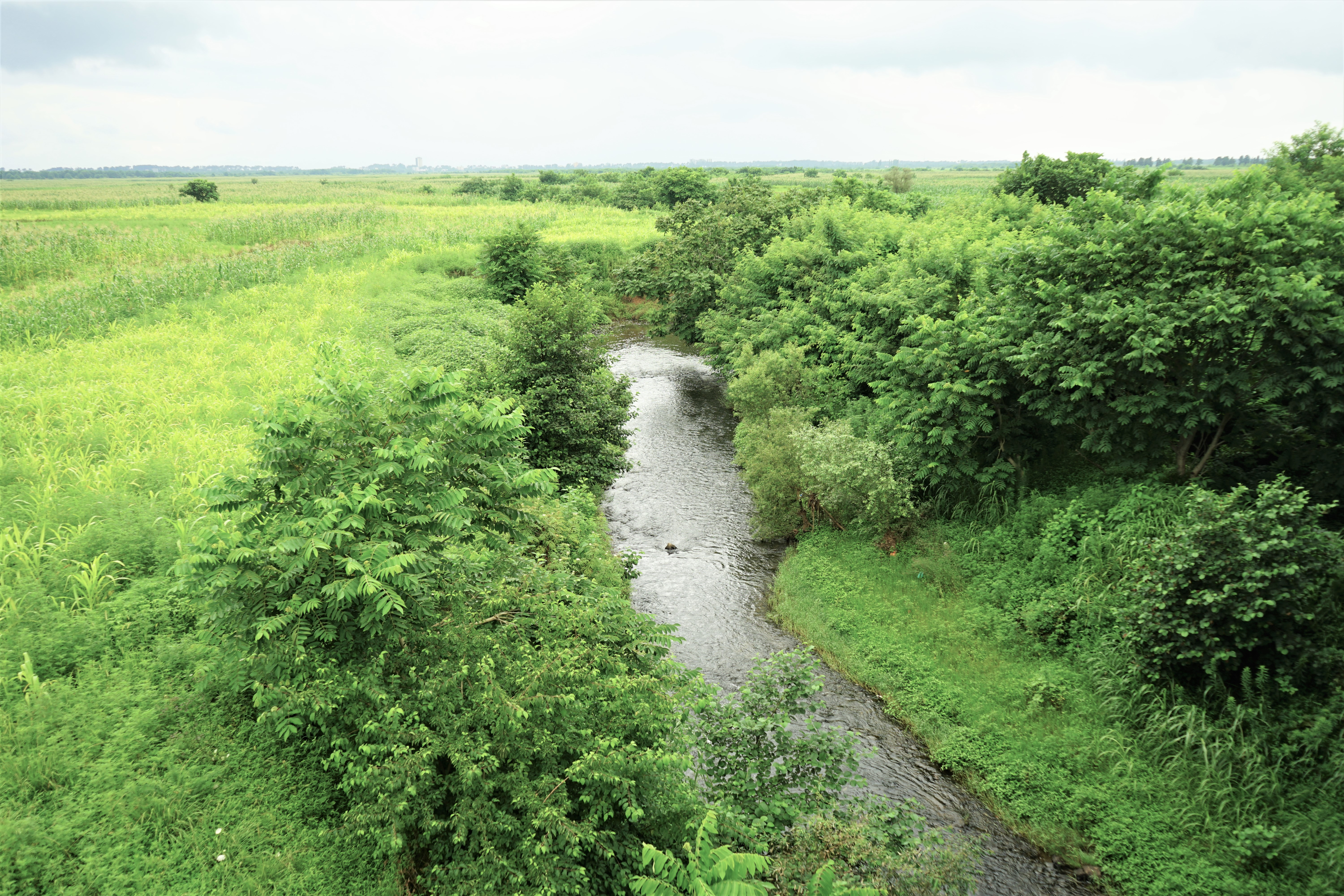
Ochkhamuri river.

Ochkhamuri is located on the banks of the Ochkhamuri river, at 12 m above sea level. It is part of the Kobuleti Municipality and is situated on the administrative boundary of the Autonomous Republic of Adjara with the rest of Georgia, specifically with the region of Guria.

== History ==
The Soviet collectivization campaign of the 1920s and 1930s made this otherwise non-notable village a part of a larger subtropical agricultural area. A tea kolkhoz farm created at Ochkhamuri triggered an influx of migrants which significantly increased the settlement's population. In 1954, the village was given the status of an urban-type settlement (Georgian: daba).

== See also ==
- Adjara
