= Tskhemliskhidi =

Tskhemliskhidi ცხემლისხიდი
- Village
- Location within Georgia Location within Guria
- Coordinates: 41°55′33″N 42°05′03″E
- Country: Georgia
- Mkhare: Guria
- Municipality: Ozurgeti
- Elevation: 90 m (300 ft)

Population (2014)
  - Total: 446
- Time zone: UTC+4 (Georgian Time)

Tskhemliskhidi (Georgian: ცხემლისხიდი) is a village in the Ozurgeti Municipality of Guria in western Georgia.
