= Kvemo Natanebi =

Kvemo Natanebi ქვემო ნატანები
- Village
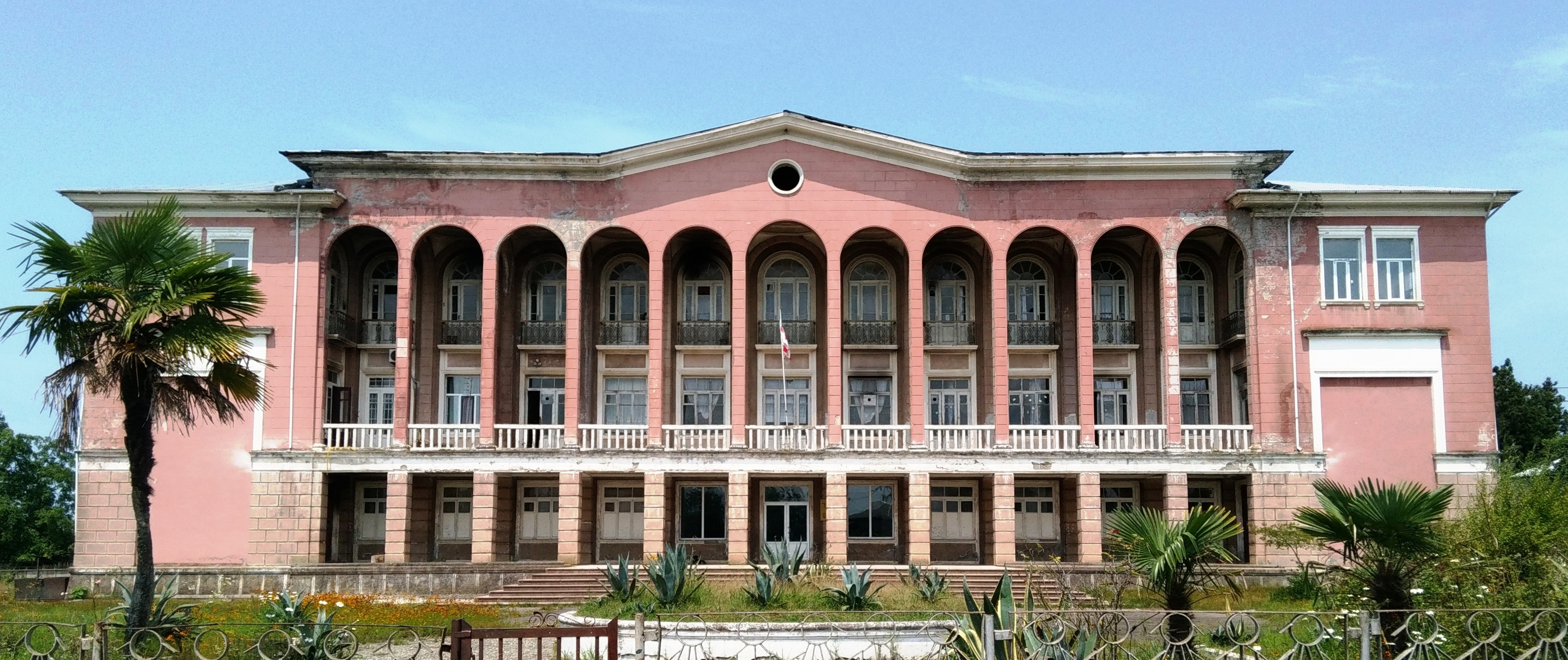
- Kvemo Natanebi School

- Location within Georgia Location within Guria
- Coordinates: 41°56′16″N 41°48′14″E
- Country: Georgia
- Mkhare: Guria
- Municipality: Ozurgeti
- Elevation: 10 m (33 ft)

Population (2014)
  - Total: 3,099
- Time zone: UTC+4 (Georgian Time)

Kvemo Natanebi (Georgian: ქვემო ნატანები) is a village in the Ozurgeti Municipality of Guria in western Georgia.
