= Chanieti =

Chanieti ჭანიეთი
- Village
- Location within Georgia Location within Guria
- Coordinates: 41°52′06″N 41°58′58″E
- Country: Georgia
- Mkhare: Guria
- Municipality: Ozurgeti
- Elevation: 120 m (390 ft)

Population (2014)
  - Total: 489
- Time zone: UTC+4 (Georgian Time)

Chanieti (Georgian: ჭანიეთი) is a village in the Ozurgeti Municipality of Guria in western Georgia.
