= Choloki =

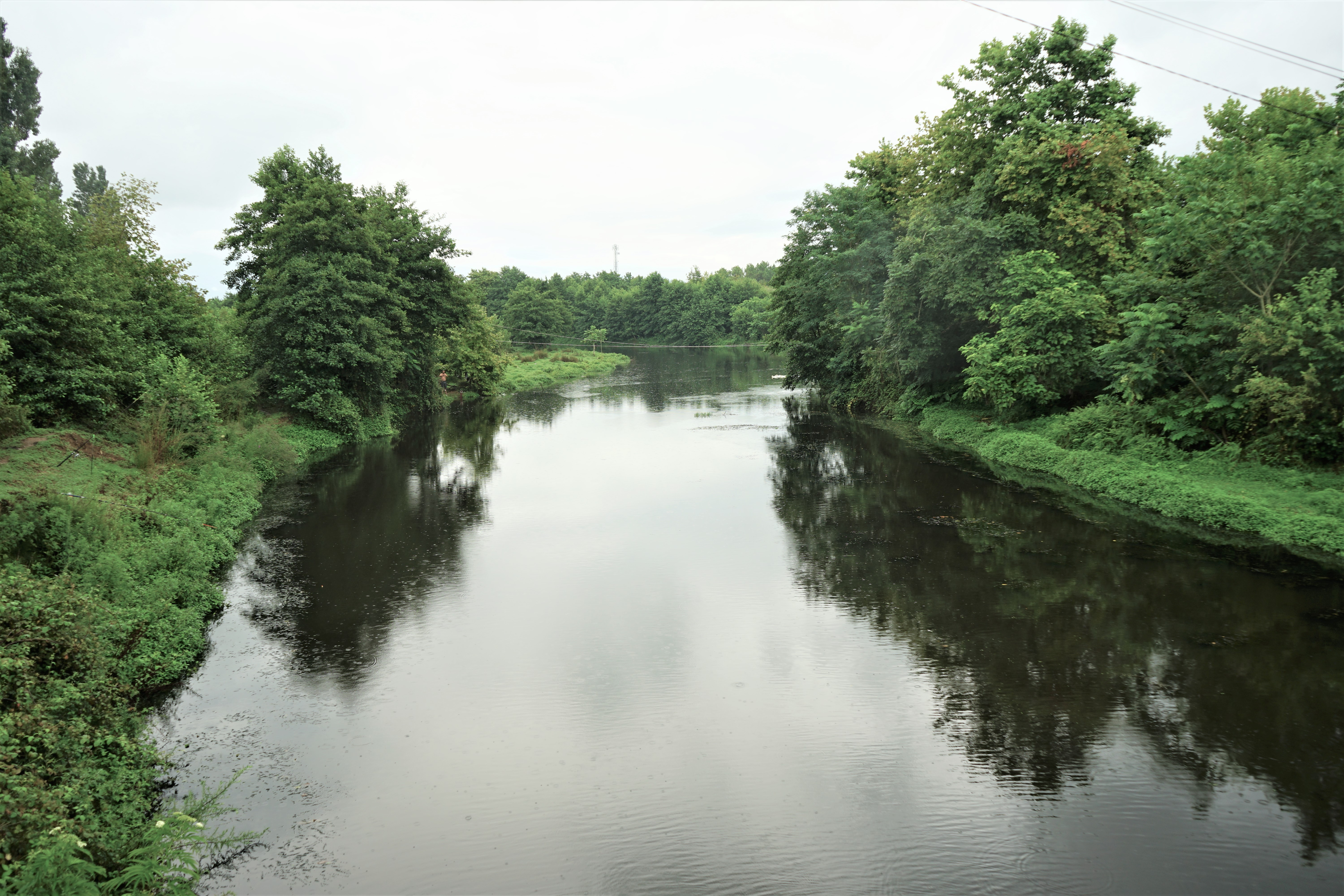
- Choloki River as seen in 2021.

- Location within Georgia
- Native name: ჩოლოქი (Georgian)

Location
- Country: Georgia
- State: Adjara

Physical characteristics
- Source: Caucasus Mountains
- Mouth: Natanebi
  - coordinates: 41°54′38″N 41°46′12″E
- Length: 29.5 km (18.3 mi)
- Basin size: 159 km^{2} (61 sq mi)

Basin features
- Progression: Natanebi→ Black Sea
- Tributaries
  - left: Ochkhamuri

The Choloki (Georgian: ჩოლოქი, also Cholok) in Georgia forms the border between the autonomous province of Ajaria and the province of Guria. For a time in the 19th century it formed the border between Turkey and Imperial Russia.

== History ==
During the Crimean War the Turks crossed it in 1853 and were driven back the following year during the Battle of Choloki.

Another military episode took place on April 16, 1918, when the Georgian National Guard under General-Lieutenant Giorgi Mazniashvili repelled a Turkish invasion force.

The bridge over Choloki river that was a main road link between Ajaria and the rest of Georgia was blown up on May 2, 2004, by the ousted leadership of the Autonomy. Ajarian leader Aslan Abashidze called the decision to blow up the bridges in the Kobuleti border region "a preventive measure against the possible attempt of military action by the central Georgian authorities."
