= Chakvi =

Chakvi ჩაქვი
- Urban-type settlement
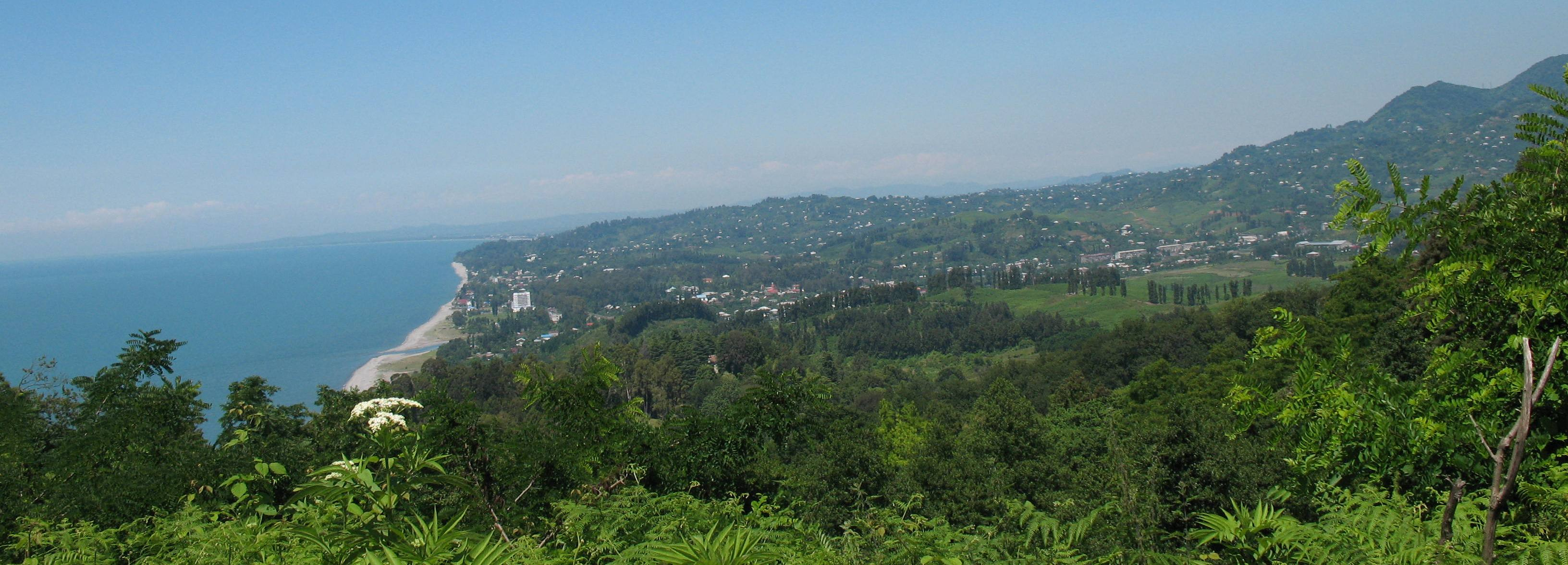
- Chakvi

- Location within Georgia Location within Adjara
- Coordinates: 41°43′08″N 41°44′00″E
- Country: Georgia
- Autonomous Republic: Adjara
- Municipality: Kobuleti
- Town from: 1954
- Elevation: 30 m (98 ft)

Population (2014)
  - Total: 6,720
- Time zone: UTC+4 (Georgian Time)

Chakvi (Georgian: ჩაქვი [tʃʰakʰʷi]), also known as Chakva, is a resort town in Georgia by the Black Sea coast. It is part of Kobuleti Municipality.

== Economy ==
Chakvi is known throughout Georgia as being the birthplace of tea production in Georgia. Chakvi was one of several tea producing areas that produced tea for the Soviet Union. Wild tea plants can still be found, and some limited tea production still continues, in the hills above Chakvi.

In July 2007 the $600,000 Chakvi radar station was constructed through oversight of the U.S. Army Corps of Engineers Europe District. It serves both the commercial and military port.

== See also ==
- Adjara
