= Grigoleti =

Grigoleti გრიგოლეთი
- Village
- Location in Georgia Grigoleti (Georgia)
- Coordinates: 42°02′13″N 41°44′21″E
- Country: (Georgia (country)) Georgia
- Region: Guria
- District: Lanchkhuti
- Elevation: 3 m (9.8 ft)

Population (2014)
  - Total: 286
- Time zone: UTC+4 (Georgian Time)

Grigoleti (Georgian: გრიგოლეთი) is a small seaside village located on the Black Sea coast in the Lanchkhuti Municipality of Guria region of Georgia.

== Geography ==
It is situated in the Guria lowlands, 1.24 miles (2 km) south of Poti, approximately 186.4 miles (300 km) west of Georgia's capital, Tbilisi, and just south of Kolkheti National Park. The village is 3 meters above sea level.

The area is covered by perennial pine trees, and its shoreline is known for its magnetic dark sand beach. The village's sand is said to have medicinal properties that treat hypertension, cardiovascular diseases, rheumatic diseases, and disorders of the central nervous system, among others.

== Demography ==
According to the 2014 national Census, Grigoleti has a population of 286.

== See also ==
- Poti
