= Natanebi =

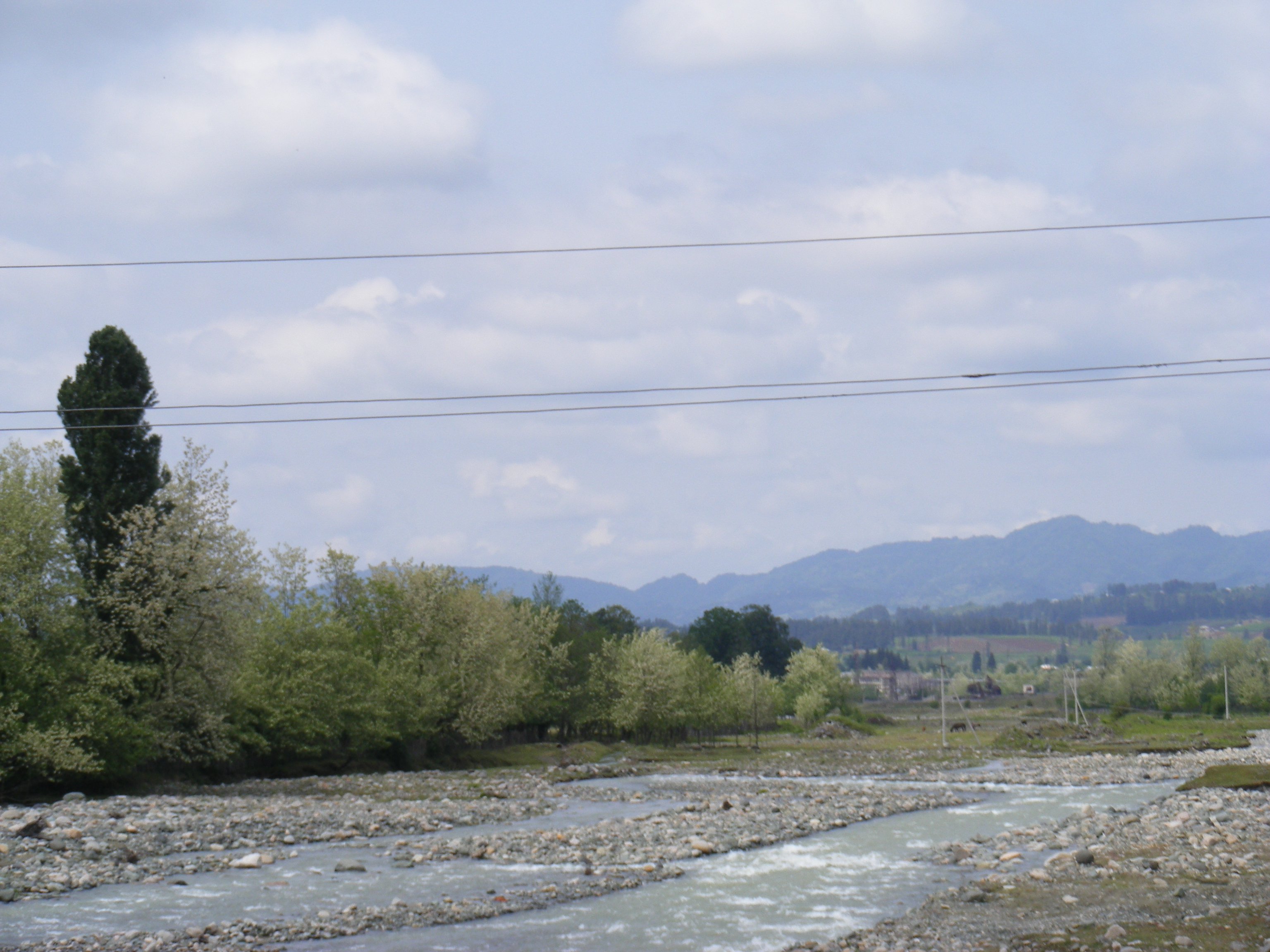
- The Natanebi near Tskhemliskhidi
- Native name: ნატანები (Georgian)

Location
- Country: Georgia

Physical characteristics
- Mouth: Black Sea
  - location: Shekvetili
  - coordinates: 41°54′50″N 41°46′01″E
- Length: 60 km (37 mi)
- Basin size: 657 km (408 mi)

Basin features
- Tributaries
  - left: Choloki

The Natanebi (Georgian: ნატანები) is a river in western Georgia, located in the region of Guria. It originates on the northern slope of the Meskheti Range, at an altitude of 2,548 m above sea level. It flows into the Black Sea near Shekvetili. It is 60 km (37 mi) long, and has a drainage basin of 657 km^{2} (254 sq mi).

The Natanebi corresponds to the ancient River Isis, described by Greek historian Arrian of Nicomedia in his Periplus of the Euxine Sea.
