= Karakala =

Karakala may refer to:

- Karakala, Armavir, Armenia
- Karakala, Kotayk, Armenia
- Karakala, Lori, Armenia
- Sevaberd, Armenia
- Karakala, Azerbaijan
- Caracal, Romania
- Garrygala, Turkmenistan, formerly Kara-Kala
