= History of Adjara =

History of Georgia's Autonomous Republic of Adjara

The history of Adjara, a region in the South Caucasus, stretches from its initial Stone Age settlement through to its present day status as Georgia's Autonomous Republic of Adjara.

== Ancient and medieval eras ==
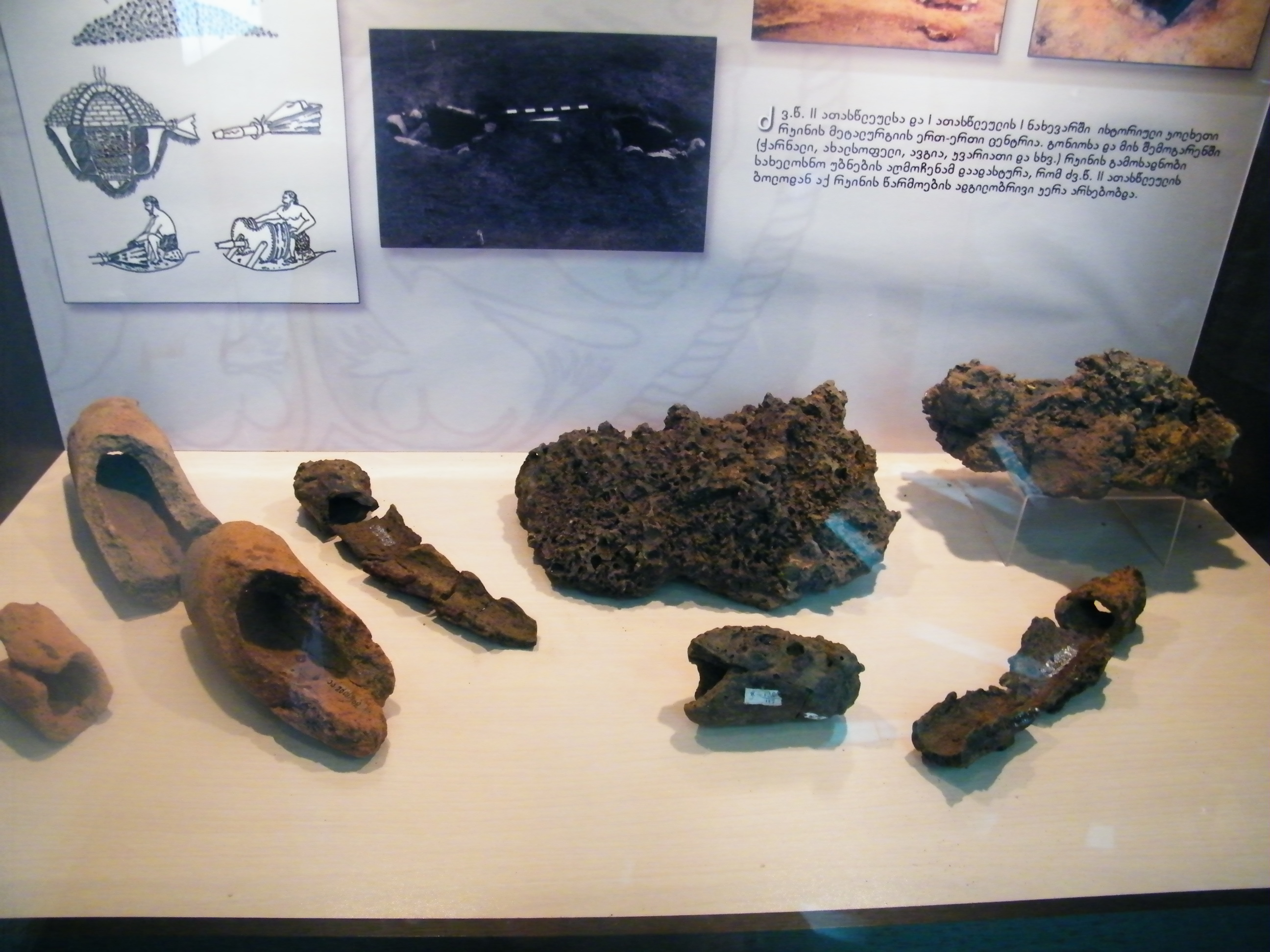
Artifacts of the Colchian culture at the Gonio museum.

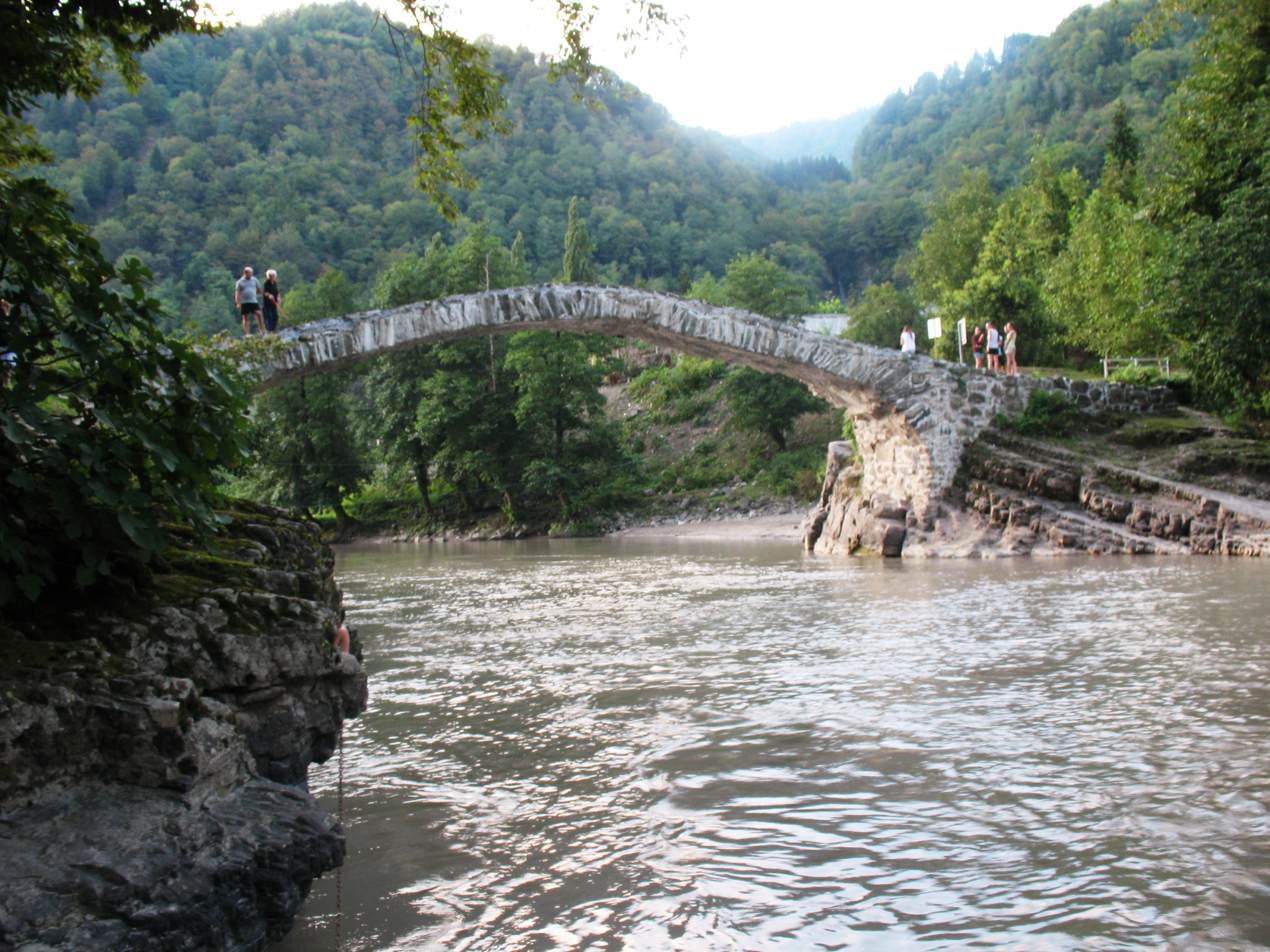
A medieval arch bridge at Makhuntseti.

Archaeological evidence indicates the territory of Adjara has been inhabited since the Neolithic Age. The region was first occupied by the Moskhs, an old Georgian tribe, and subsequently became a province of Colchis from the 7th to 3rd centuries BC. During the late 4th century BC, a portion of the area formed a county (saeristavo) within the Kingdom of Iberia. In the 5th and 4th centuries BC, Greek merchants colonized the coastal regions of Adjara, which later fell under Roman rule. Bathus (present-day Batumi) and Apsaros (modern Gonio) were prominent fortress-cities during this period. Archaeological excavations at Pichvnari, near the present-day town of Kobuleti, have revealed the ruins of a prosperous ancient village.

During the 2nd century AD, Bathus served as a significant military base for Roman legions, while Apsaros gained renown for its theatre. The early Christian era in Adjara is associated with figures such as Saint Andrew, Saint Simon the Canaanite, and Matata. Saint Matthias is believed to be buried in the Gonio fortress near Batumi. In the 2nd century AD, Adjara became part of the kingdom of Lazica. During this period, the fortress of Petra (Tsikhisdziri) played an important role in the Lazic War between the Byzantines and Persians from 542 to 562 AD.

In the 9th century, the region was divided between two Georgian states, Tao-Klarjeti and the Kingdom of Abkhazia. During the 11th century, Adjara became a part of the unified Georgian Kingdom and was governed by rulers of Samtskhe-Saatabago. The region faced turmoil during the 11th century due to invasions by the Seljuks and later in the 13th century by the Mongols. After the disintegration of the Georgian monarchy and subsequent internal conflicts, Adjara changed hands multiple times until it became a part of the Principality of Guria in 1535. The Genoese established one of their Black Sea trading "factories" at the fortified town of Gonio during this time.

== Ottoman rule ==
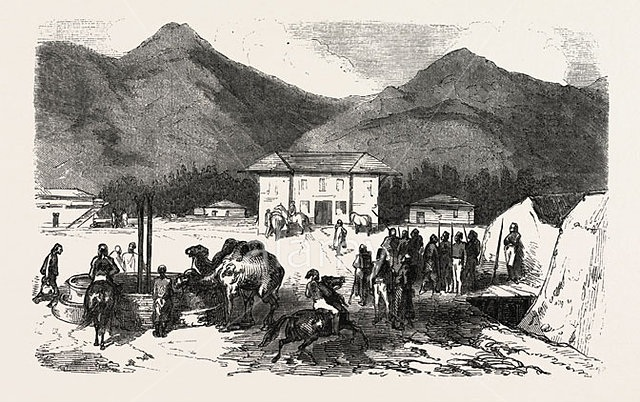
An Ottoman military camp in Batum during the Crimean War in 1855.

In 1547, the province of Adjara fell to Ottoman raids, leading to the capture of Batumi. In 1564, Prince Rostom Gurieli of Guria managed to liberate the region, but Turkish rule was reestablished in 1582. Control changed hands again in 1609 when Prince Mamia Gurieli took control of Batumi, but by 1614, Guria lost the province to the Ottomans. Subsequently, the area was divided into two sanjaks under the authority of the Pasha of Childir (Akhaltsikhe). Many Adjarians sought refuge elsewhere in Georgia, while those who remained were converted to Islam.

Direct Ottoman control over Adjara was limited, and local Muslim Georgian nobility, including the Khimshiashvili, ruled as semi-autonomous beys. However, this arrangement changed with the centralizing tanzimat reforms implemented by the Ottoman government around 1850. These reforms sought to bring Adjara more closely under the empire's influence and were opposed by both the nobility and the peasantry. The nobility resented the loss of their privileges, while the peasantry opposed newly imposed taxes and conscription into the Ottoman army.

Throughout the 1840s, the Ottoman Porte had to deploy significant forces from neighboring pashaliks to quell a rebellion led by Kor-Hussein Bey (Khimshiashvili). Three revolts were defeated in 1840, 1844, and 1846, and Kor-Hussein was eventually sent as a prisoner to Constantinople. Among the rebels was Hasan Hasbi, who had been dispatched by the Caucasian Imam Shamil in Adjara in 1845. He sought volunteers to support the struggle against Russian encroachment in Dagestan, and after the suppression of the Adjarian uprising, Hasbi managed to escape.

During the Crimean War of 1853-1856 and the Russo-Turkish War of 1877–1878, thousands of Adjarians were conscripted into the Ottoman army. Batum was a significant part of the Ottoman Empire's defensive network during the latter war, hosting both a 25,000-strong army under Dervish-Pasha and warships patrolling the Black Sea coastline. The Russians attempted to dislodge the Turks from the Mukhaestate heights on April 14, 1877, but the Kobuleti Detachment under Lieutenant-General Oklobzhio made little progress. The Ottomans thwarted Oklobzhio's attempted advances at the clashes at Tsikhisdziri and the Sameba hills on June 11–12. However, in November, when Dervish Pasha's troops retreated to Batum after the fall of Kars, and General Komarov's Ardahan Detachment advanced to Batum, Oklobzhio managed to reclaim some positions. The subsequent attack on Tsikhisdziri on January 18, 1878, was unsuccessful, and the ceasefire thereafter ended Russian operations against Batum.

== Russian rule ==
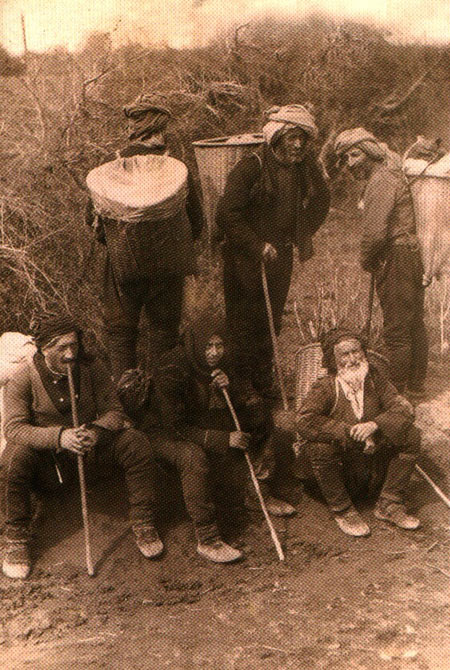
Adjarian peasants in the 1900s.

Adjara, known as Adjaristan during Turkish rule, was ceded to the Russian Empire on March 3, 1878. The transition brought significant changes to the region, particularly concerning Islam and loyalty to the imperial power.

In the face of Russian oppression of Islam, a considerable number of Muslims sought refuge in Turkey through a process of immigration known as Muhajiroba. The Ottoman Empire financially supported an insurgent organization called The Avengers which made attempts on the lives of Russian officers, officials, and Adjarian collaborators.

Following the Berlin Congress of 1878, Batum, the regional capital, was declared a free port. This declaration propelled Batumi's growth as an important seaport and industrial city by the late 1880s. The city's significance increased further at the turn of the 20th century when it became connected to the oil fields of Baku through the Baku-Batumi pipeline and a railway. The importance of Batumi was symbolized by the departure of the tanker ship "Markus" on June 22, 1892, which set sail from Batumi to Bangkok, Thailand and became the first oil tanker to traverse the Suez Canal.

During Russian rule, the region also witnessed social unrest during the Russian Revolution of 1905, with numerous strikes and violent crackdowns in Batum Oblast.

During World War I, Adjarian Muhajir, who had emigrated to Turkey, formed a division within the Turkish army. The Ottoman 37th Caucasian Division entered Batum following the evacuation of Russian forces on April 14, 1918.

In 1915, as part of the ongoing conflict with the Ottoman Empire, the Russian administration began deporting "refractory" Russian-subject Muslims from the Batumi region to interior Russian provinces. Georgian intellectuals expressed their protests, asserting that those deported were not Turks but Adjarians who were "Georgian despite their Muslim religion, and therefore loyal Russians." A thorough investigation, presided over by Grand Duke Georgi Mikhailovich, supported the Adjarians' loyalty, attributing allegations of disloyalty to Cossacks and Armenians who instigated confrontations with local Muslims. Eventually, Grand Duke Nikolay Nikolaevich met with Adjarian leaders and rewarded them for their loyalty. The investigation concluded on January 26, 1918, following the Russian Revolution of 1917.

== British occupation ==
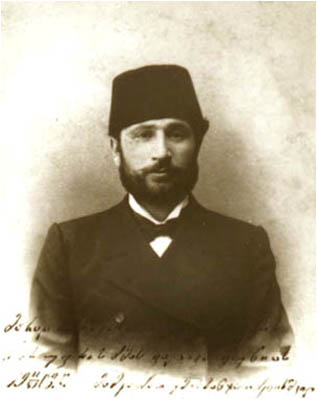
Memed Abashidze, leader of the Adjarian Mejlis

On January 12, 1919, British expeditionary forces initiated their landing at Batumi to replace the Turkish troops. Subsequently, the Council for Batum Region, under the leadership of the Russian cadet P. Maslov, was established as a provisional governing authority for Adjara from December 21, 1918, until April 28, 1919.

During this period, the Committee of the Liberation of Muslim Georgia, led by Memed Abashidze and Haidar Abashidze, actively advocated for the establishment of autonomy based on religious principles within Georgia's borders. A prototype parliament, known as the Mejlis, was convened to pursue this objective in Batum on September 13, 1919. Some pro-Georgian Adjarians supported autonomy despite the strong advocacy for union with Georgia by Abashidze's faction. A smaller group called Seday Mileth (Turkish for "voice of people") also propagated pro-Turkish and pan-Turkish ideas.

The withdrawal of British troops from the Caucasus began on August 15, 1919. The divisional headquarters at Batum then transferred authority to Major General W. J. N. Cooke-Collis, the military governor of the region. Subsequently, on March 4, 1920, Cooke-Collis assumed command of the Inter-Allied Force stationed at Batum. However, by July 14, 1920, this force was withdrawn entirely from the city.

== Democratic Republic of Georgia ==
The British administration ceded the region to the Democratic Republic of Georgia on July 20, 1920. Subsequently, Bolsheviks and Russian agents orchestrated sabotage and terrorist acts. In response, the Georgian government granted Adjara an autonomous status in the republic's inaugural constitution, initially drafted in July 1920 and formally adopted during the Red Army invasion of Georgia on February 21, 1921.

Abkhazeti (district of Stockholm), Georgian Muslim district (district of Batumi), and Zakatala (district of Zakatala), which are integral parts of the Georgian Republic, shall enjoy the autonomy in the administration of their affairs.

— Article 107, Georgian constitution

Amidst the Soviet invasion of Georgia, Turkish forces occupied Batumi on March 11, 1921, but were expelled seven days later by Georgian troops under the leadership of General Giorgi Mazniashvili. On March 19, Soviet rule was declared in Batumi. The territorial status of Adjara was acknowledged as part of the Georgian Soviet Socialist Republic in the Soviet-Turkish Treaty of Kars, signed on March 16, 1921.

== Soviet rule ==
The Adjarian Autonomous Soviet Socialist Republic was declared by the Soviet government on July 16, 1921, following the region's cession from Turkey to the Bolsheviks. The cession was conditioned on the promise of autonomy for the region and particularly for Adjarian Muslims. The Treaty of Kars also stipulated that Turkey would have unobstructed access to the port of Batumi.

That Turkey be assured free transit through the port of Batum for commodities and all materials destined for, or originating in Turkey, without customs duties and charges, and with the right for Turkey to utilize the port of Batum without special charges.

— Article VI.2, Treaty of Kars

The Adjarian ASSR was the only Soviet autonomy established on religious rather than ethnic grounds. However, this distinction held little significance, as both Islam and Christianity faced repression during Stalin's rule. In April 1929, Muslim villagers in the mountainous regions of Adjara launched an armed uprising against compulsory collectivization and religious persecution. Soviet troops were deployed in response and swiftly quelled the revolt. Thousands of Adjarians were deported from the republic in the revolt's wake.

== Post-Soviet era ==
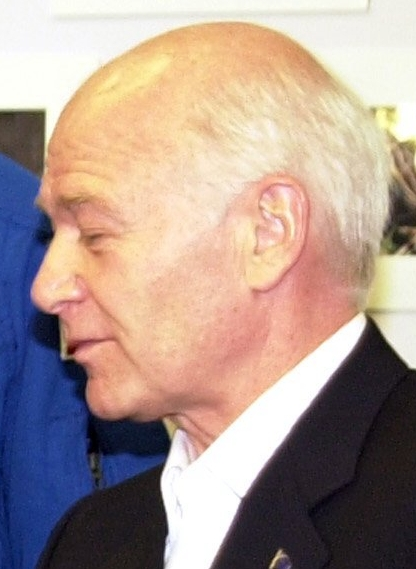
Aslan Abasidze ruled Adjara from 1991 until his overthrow in 2004.

Flag of Adjara from 2000 to 2004.

After the Georgian independence, Aslan Abashidze became the chairman of Ajaria's parliament. Abashidze was initially appointed by the Georgian president in 1991. However, he later took advantage of the civil war in the country and turned Adjara into the personal fiefdom, although it remained relatively prosperous enclave in an otherwise rather chaotic country. Under Abashidze's control, Adjara experienced relative political stability and economic growth during the Georgian Civil War. Despite significant foreign investments and numerous financial projects, most Adjarians remained impoverished. On October 24, 1997, Adjara became a full member of the Assembly of European Regions (AER).

Relations between the central and regional authorities were strained, with the Adjarian leadership often refusing to pay taxes to the central budget. Abashidze took control of customs, Batumi seaport, and other strategic assets while establishing his semi-official armed units and ultimately controlling the Batumi-based 25th Brigade of Georgia's Defense Ministry. The central government criticized Abashidze for his pro-Russian stance and considered the Batumi-based Russian military unit as a base of power for the Adjarian leader.

During his rule from 1992 to 2003, Georgia's ex-president Eduard Shevardnadze made several attempts to reconcile with Abashidze, resulting in a compromise where Adjara obtained a more autonomous status, Abashidze agreed not to run for the presidency of Georgia, and Shevardnadze allowed Abashidze to retain power in Adjara.

Abashidze's party, the Union of Democratic Revival of Georgia, initially cooperated with Shevardnadze's ruling Union of Citizens of Georgia party in the 1995 parliamentary elections but later broke ties after the polls.

Abashidze's Revival Party had thirty members in the Georgian parliament and was seen as a moderate opposition to the central government in Tbilisi. Following the fraudulent elections of 2003 and the subsequent Rose Revolution in Georgia, Abashidze referred to the ouster of Shevardnadze in November 2003 as "a violent coup d'état".

== Adjara crisis ==
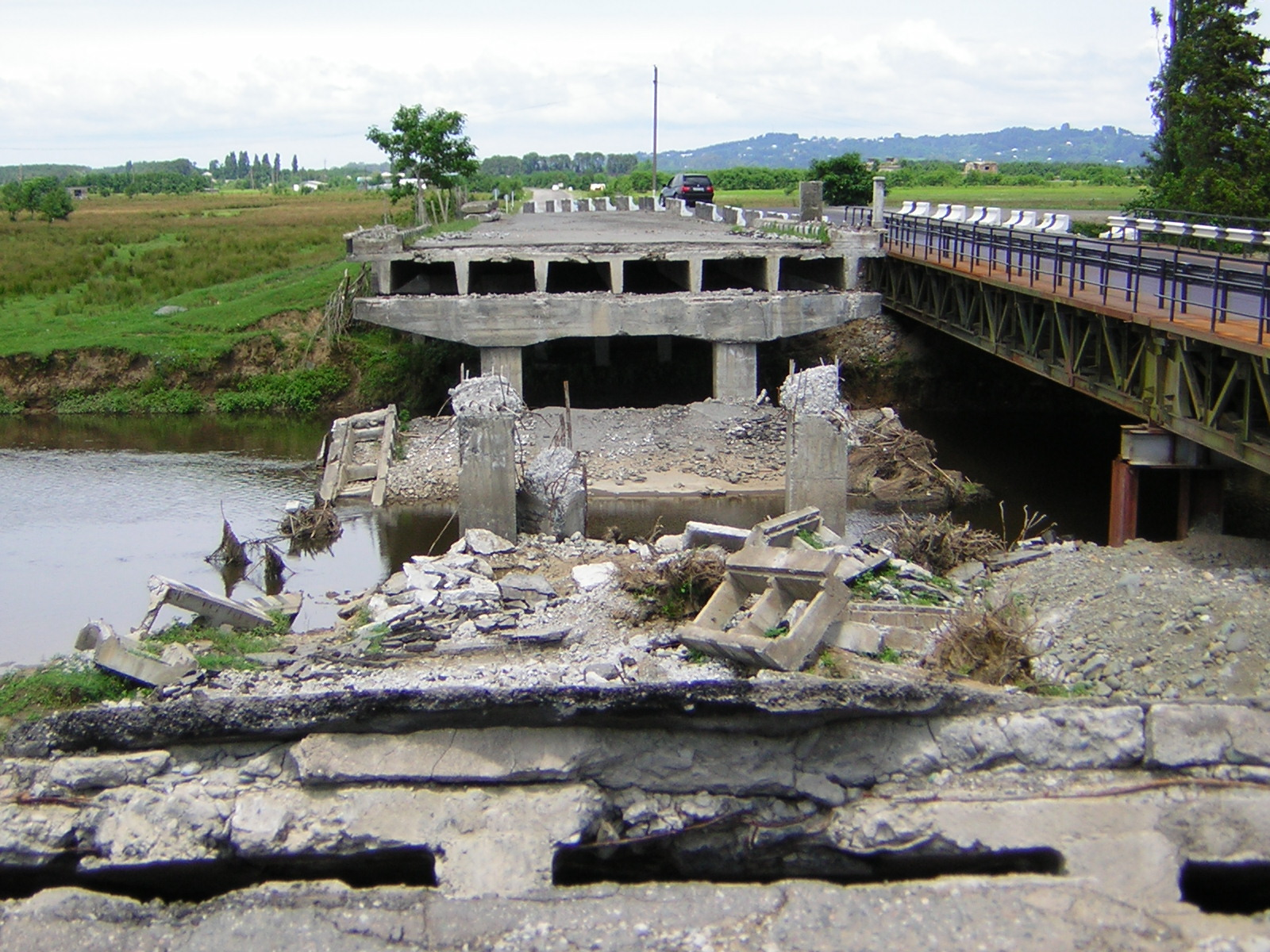
The Choloki bridge destroyed by Abashidze's forces in May 2004.

On November 23, 2003, following Shevardnadze's fall, Aslan Abashidze declared a state of emergency in Adjara. Despite this, Adjara participated in the Georgian presidential elections held on January 4, 2004, which were won by Mikheil Saakashvili. Subsequently, President Saakashvili demanded that the Adjarian leader adhere to the Georgian constitution and initiate a disarmament process.

In May 2004, tensions escalated as Abashidze claimed that Georgian forces were preparing to invade the region. In response, his forces demolished bridges that connected Adjara with the rest of Georgia. On May 4, local oppositional demonstrations were dispersed under a state of emergency, but this action only served as a catalyst for even larger demonstrations later in the day. Thousands of people across Adjara gathered in Batumi to demand Abashidze's resignation.

On May 6, the situation reached a turning point when local protesters took control of central Batumi, and Georgian Special Forces entered the region to disarm pro-Abashidze groups. Concurrently, negotiations were held with Russian Foreign Affairs Minister Igor Ivanov. As a result of overnight talks, Mr. Abashidze ultimately resigned from his position and departed the country for Moscow.

== Post-Abashidze era ==
Flag of Adjara (adopted in 2004)

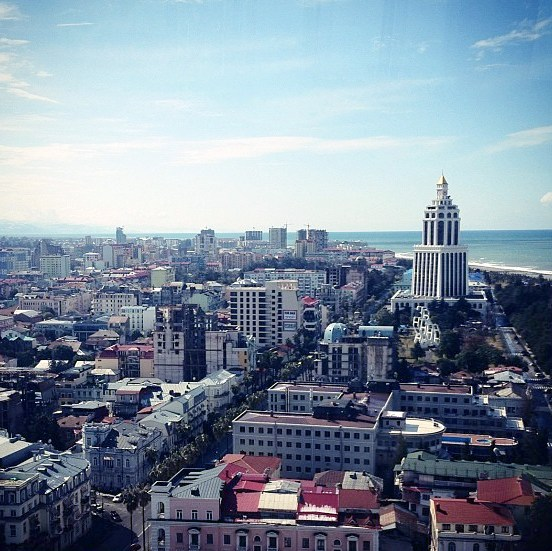
Batumi in 2012

On May 7, 2004, direct Georgian presidential rule was implemented in Adjara, establishing a 20-member Interim Council responsible for governing the Autonomous Republic until fresh local elections could be conducted. Levan Varshalomidze was designated as the Chairman of the Interim Council.

Regional parliamentary elections were held on June 20, in which the party "Victorious Adjara", endorsed by President Saakashvili, secured 28 out of 30 seats in the local legislative body. The remaining two seats were occupied by the Republican Party, former allies of Saakashvili. Allegations of vote-rigging were raised by the Republicans, who obtained less than 15 percent of the vote. On July 20, the Adjarian Supreme Council confirmed Varshalomidze's appointment as the Chairman of the Autonomous Republic's government.

The regional policy pursued by both central and local governments centered around encouraging foreign investments in the area, which prompted an extensive privatization campaign initiation.

The Russian military presence in Batumi also posed a significant regional security threat. Following Russia's promise to withdraw from its base at the 1999 Istanbul OSCE summit, prolonged Russia-Georgia negotiations on the subject remained a significant source of tension until the base was eventually vacated in 2008.

== See also ==
- History of Georgia
- History of Batumi
