= History of Batumi =

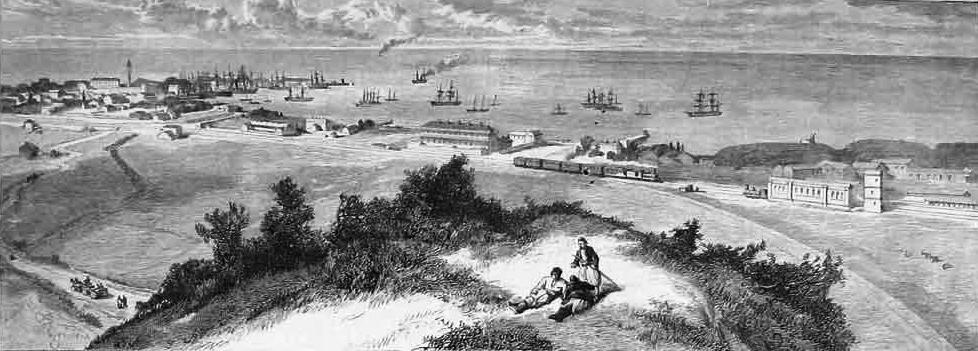
Batumi in the 1880s

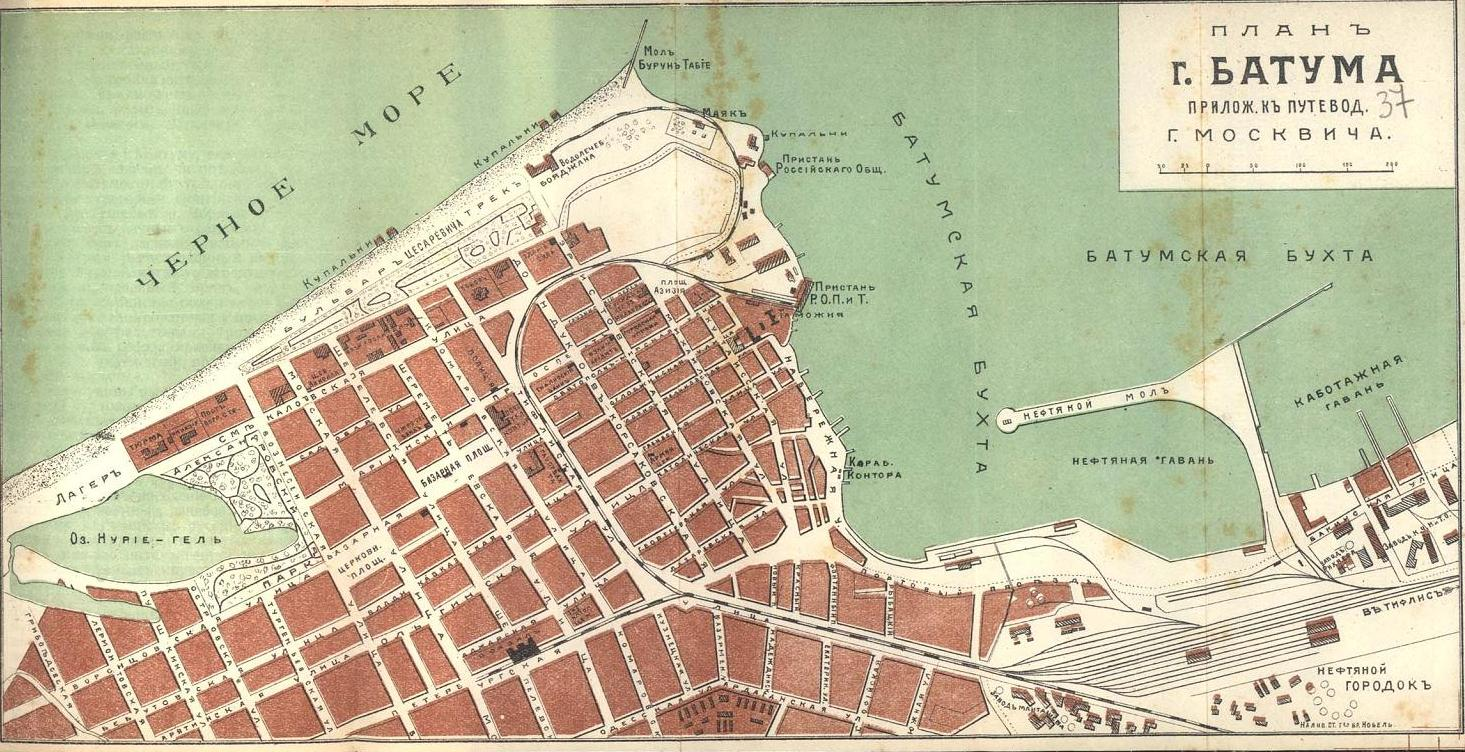
Map of Batumi, 1913

Batumi (Georgian: ბათუმი) is the capital city of Adjara, an autonomous republic in southwest Georgia, located on the eastern coast of the Black Sea.

The history of Batumi is inextricably bound with that of Adjara. Founded on the site of the Hellenic colony of Bathys, it was a small fortified town in the medieval kingdom of Georgia. In the 17th century, Batumi was conquered by the Ottoman Empire which relinquished its control of the town to the Russian Empire in 1878. It was under the Russian rule that Batumi became a major port city on the crossroads of Eurasia. After the successive Ottoman and British occupations at the end of World War I, Batumi and its region passed to the Democratic Republic of Georgia in 1920. After the Sovietization of Georgia in 1921, Adjara was granted the status of an autonomous republic and Batumi became its capital. Along with Poti, Batumi is one of Georgia's most important ports. It is also an important cultural and political center.

== Early history ==
Batumi is purported to be located on the site of one of the Greek colonies on the coast of Colchis. Its environs the ancient Greeks named Bathus Limen or Bathys Limen (i.e., "deep harbor", a description rightfully applicable to the gulf on which Batumi itself stands), hence the city's modern name. This Bathys is sometimes identified with Portus altus, possibly a Latin rendition of the locale's Greek name, of the Tabula Peutingeriana, a road map from the Roman period.

The earliest archaeologically confirmed settlement on the territory of present-day Batumi dates to the 8th-7th century BC. It is located along the Karolitskhali River and centered on a hillock which is now popularly referred to as Tamar's Fortress after the medieval Georgian queen Tamar (r. 1184–1213). A number of unearthed imported items, fragments of amphorae among them, testify to the Greek influence there. The locale was a home to a Roman military fort during the reign of Hadrian (r. 117-138 AD), but was deserted for the fortress of Petra constructed under Justinian I (r. 527–565) on the site of the present-day Tsikhisdziri to the north of Batumi.

== Medieval Batumi ==
The medieval history of Batumi, or Batomi as Georgians called it down to the early 20th century, is scarcely mentioned in the contemporary sources. However, it reemerges in both Georgian and European accounts in the 15th century. The Venetian diplomats, Giosafat Barbaro and Ambrogio Contarini, call Batumi Vati or Vathi. Barbaro reports it being one of the two ports of the lord "Bendian" (the other being Sebastopolis, i.e., modern-day Sukhumi), while Contarini describes it as a maritime town centered on a fortress. The "Bendian" of Barbaro is apparently a corruption of Bediani, the title of the Dadiani princes who governed several western Georgian provinces under the increasingly nominal authority of the kings of Georgia.

A curious incident occurred in 1444 when the Burgundian flotilla, after a failed crusade against the Ottoman Empire, penetrated the Black Sea and engaged in piracy along its eastern coastline until the Burgundians under the knight Geoffroy de Thoisy were ambushed during their landing raid at Vati/Batumi. De Thoisy was taken captive and released through the mediation of the emperor John IV of Trebizond.

== Ottoman control ==
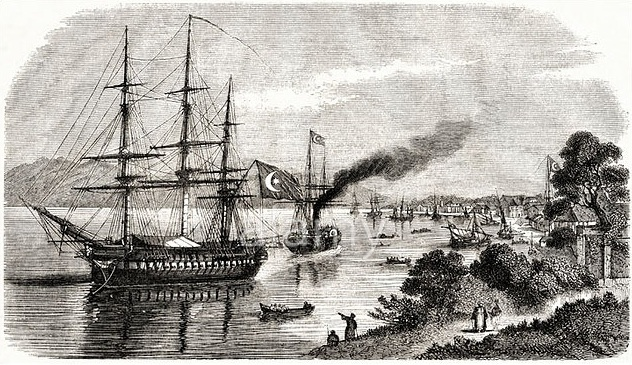
An Ottoman navy frigate in the port of Batum during the Crimean War. c. 1854

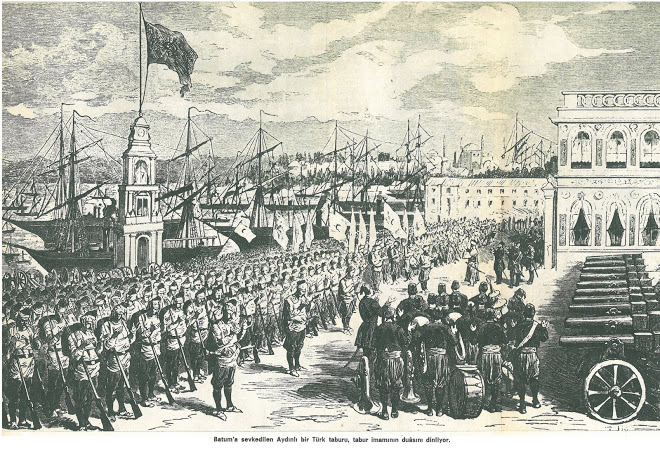
Ottoman troops in Batum

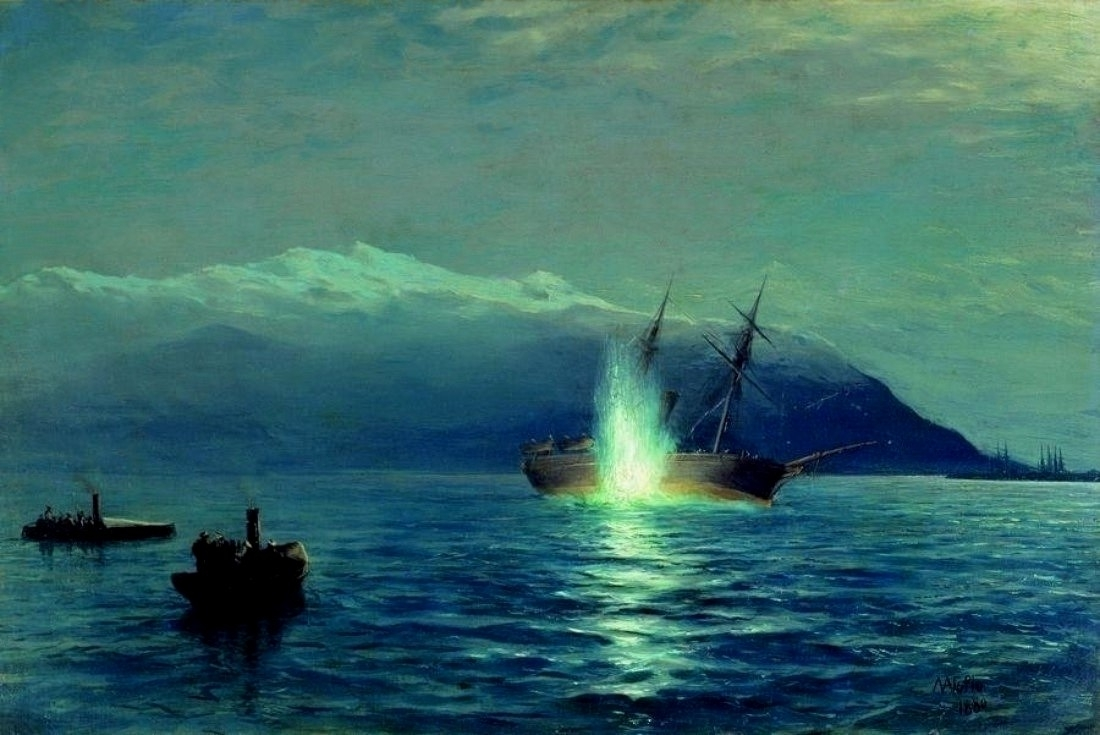
A naval battle between the Russian and Turkish vessels off Batumi in 1878

After the fragmentation of the Kingdom of Georgia in the late 15th century, the town and district of Batumi passed to the Georgian noble house of Gurieli, Princes of Guria. In the reign of Kakhaber II Gurieli (1469–1483), the Ottomans occupied Batumi, but did not hold it. They returned in force a century later after the decisive defeat which they inflicted on the combined army of Georgian rulers at Sokhoista in 1545. Batumi was reclaimed, first by the prince Rostom Gurieli in 1564, who lost it soon afterwards, and again in 1609 by Mamia II Gurieli. However, the Ottoman naval blockade imposed on the western Georgian coast forced Mamia II into surrendering Batumi and Adjara to the Ottoman control in the treaty of 13 December 1614.

Under the Ottoman government, the city was known as "Batoum" and was made a center of a sanjak that stretched from the Chrorokhi-Adjaristskali basin to Tsikhis-Dziri to the north of the city. With the Ottoman conquest the Islamization of the region, hitherto Christian, began and would be completed by the end of the 18th century. The Georgian geographer Prince Vakhushti (1696–1757) describes Batoum as a town with an excellent citadel, while the French consul Adrien Dupré, who visited the area in 1807, reports it being a large village with a population of 2,000 living in the houses scattered along the bay and in the nearby forests. Batoum had an active port, which was also a big center of the Caucasian slave-trade.

During the Russo-Turkish War of 1828-1829, the Russian imperial general Dmitri Osten-Sacken made an unsuccessful attempt to penetrate to Batoum by the valley of the Ajaris-Tskali, but he only reached Khulo, far east of Batoum. During the following two decades, the Ottoman government consolidated their hold of the Batoum area by eliminating the power of the Khimshiashvili, a local family of Muslim Georgian beys.

In 1863, the Ottoman government decided to make Batoum a principal town of the Lazistan province and began the construction of a new town to the north-west of the extant harbor. A new fort Burun-Tabiya was also built at the cape of Batoum. By 1872, Batoum had a population of around 5,000. It was ruled by a chief administrator, mutasarrıf, who was directly subordinated to the governor-general (wali) of Trabzon. The town was home to the Italian, Russian, and Persian consulates and an increasingly lively trading center. Yet, it was a typical Asian town, with scattered houses and muddy streets.

In spite of the tight Ottoman control, the Russian interest toward Batoum did not fade. In 1876, a thorough reconnaissance of the area was made by a Georgian scholar and colonel in the Russian service, Prince Giorgi Kazbegi, who left the only general account of the region available at that time. During the Russo-Turkish War of 1877-1878, the Ottomans had Batoum heavily fortified and successfully resisted the Russian amphibious attempts at capturing the town. However, an eventual defeat in the war forced the Sublime Porte to cede Batoum and Adjara, among other territories, to the Russian Empire in the Treaty of San Stefano of 3 March 1878. This clause was confirmed, following dramatic negotiations, by the final act of the Congress of Berlin in July 1878. In exchange for acquiescing in a Russian acquisition of Batoum, the British Foreign Secretary Marquess of Salisbury persuaded the Russian diplomats to declare Batoum a free port, fortifications, naval arsenal, or naval station being forbidden.

== Imperial Russian rule ==
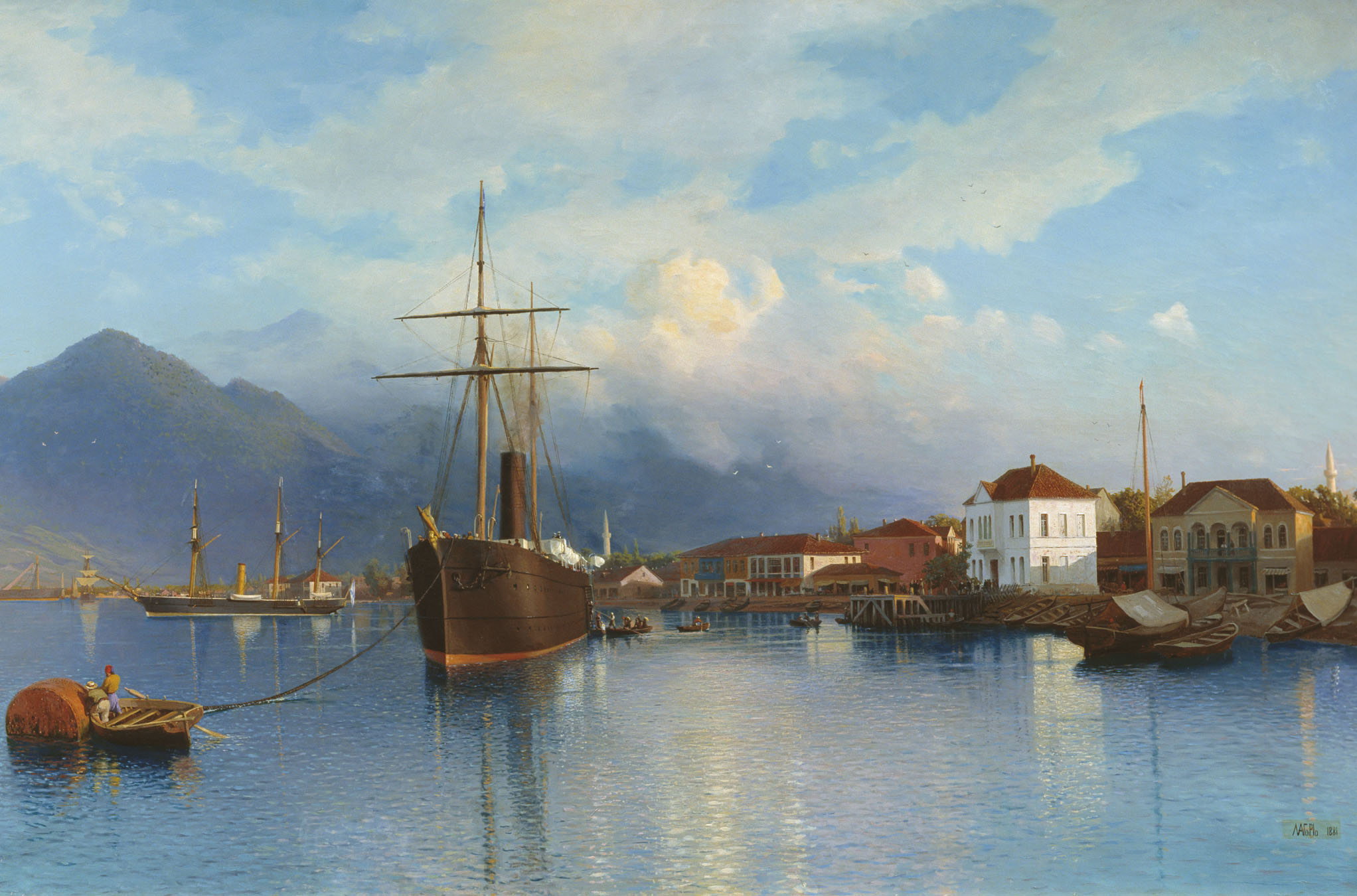
Port of Batumi in 1881

On 25 August 1878, the Russian army under General Dmitry Ivanovich Svyatopolk-Mirsky entered Batoum, and the Ottoman marshal Dervish-Pasha surrendered him a city key in Aziziye Square (modern-day Freedom Square).

The town was declared a free port until 1886. It functioned as a center of a special military district until being incorporated in the Government of Kutaisi on 12 June 1883. Finally, on 1 June 1903, with the Okrug of Artvin, it was established as the region (oblast) of Batumi placed under the direct control of the General Government of Georgia.

Batum was officially granted the city status and the right to elect the city council (duma) on 28 April 1888. On 2 September 1888, Gavronsky elected the first mayor of Batum. On 25 January 1895, Prince Luka Asatiani, former mayor of Kutaisi, was elected a mayor of Batum. He was re-elected in 1898. He presided over several modernizing projects such and suddenly died in 1902. He was succeeded by Prince Ivane Andronikashvili, who remained on this post until 1916 when he moved to Tiflis.

The expansion of Batumi began in 1883, with the construction of the Batumi-Tiflis-Baku railway completed in 1900 by the finishing of the Baku-Batumi pipeline. Henceforth Batumi became the chief Russian oil port in the Black Sea. The town expanded to an extraordinary extent and the population increased very rapidly: 8,671 inhabitants in 1882, and 12,000 in 1889. By 1902 the population was 16,000, with 1,000 of them oil refinery workers.

== War, Communism and Independence ==
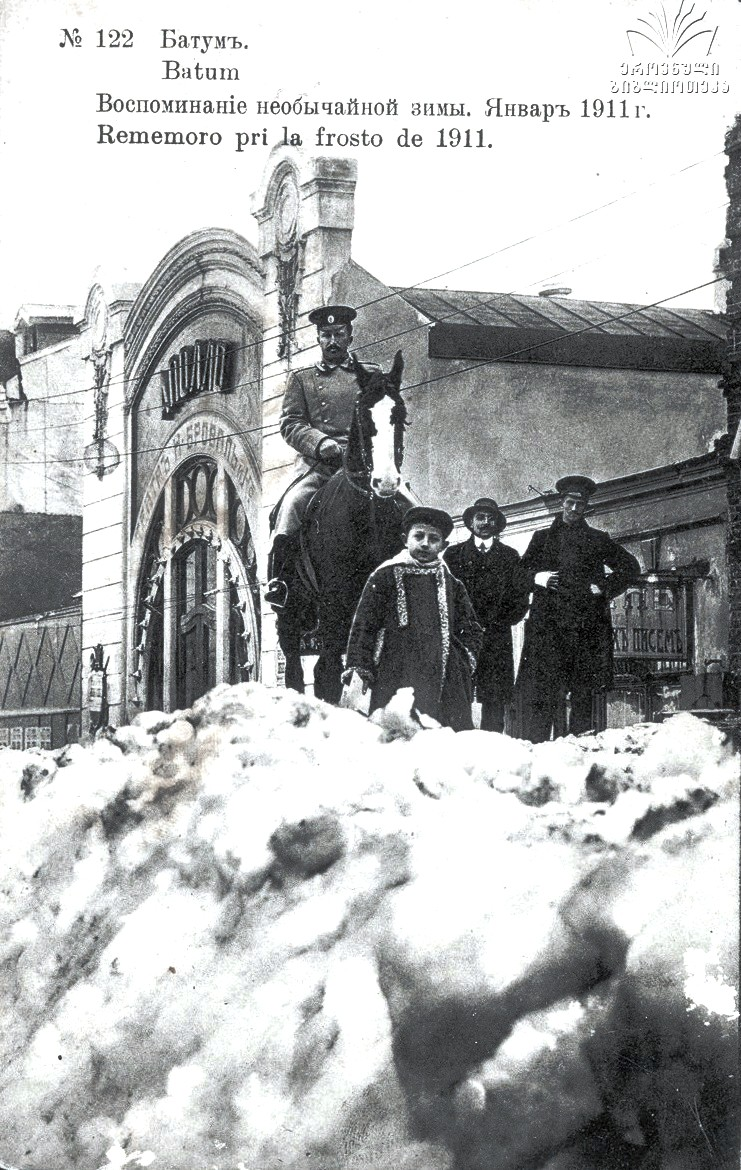
Batumi, winter of 1911

Early in the 1900s, Batumi became a focus of Social Democratic agitation, leading to a mass strike at the Rothschild oil refinery in March 1902. Stalin arrived in late 1901 setting up base in Ali, the Persian tavern. He got a job at the Rothschild's refinery.

1 January 1902 (Julian calendar ): Stalin made a speech to 30 party members shouting "We mustn't fear death! The sun is rising. Let's sacrifice our lives!"

4 January: Stalin set the refinery on fire, the workers put it out meaning they are due a bonus which is refused. Stalin got a printing press from Tiflis and called a strike.

17 February: the strikers win a 30% pay increase.

26 February: 389 radical workers are sacked. Stalin calls a second strike.

7 March: strike leaders arrested.

8 March: Stalin leads demonstrations outside the police station demanding their release. The prisoners are moved to a transit prison. Governor general Smagin agrees to meet the demonstrators.

10 March: A mob tries to storm the prison but a renegade tips off the Cossacks and troops who fire on them though some prisoners escape. The events culminated in rioting in which the future Soviet leader Joseph Stalin played a role. The clashes with police left 15 dead, 54 wounded, and 500 in prison.

12 March: the dead workers are buried triggering a 7,000 strong demonstration surrounded by Cossacks and gendarmes who ban songs and speeches.

In 1910, the Russian authorities decided to dismantle the Mikhailovsky naval fortress at Batumi. In the period of 1912–1913, a gunboat was stationed permanently to keep a check on arms smuggling. Although the project to dismantle the Batum fortifications had not been completed by the beginning of World War I in 1914, the port still remained vulnerable to the powerful Ottoman-German vessels SMS Breslau and Goeben, which shelled Batum, without much effect, on 7 and 10 December, respectively. Further, Batum's docks lacked the repair shops necessary for supporting and servicing any considerable naval force. In January 1915, the Batumi Naval Detachment was established to support the Russian ground operations against Trebizond.

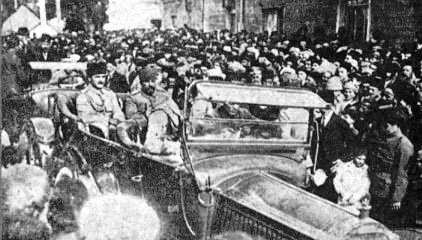
Ottoman military officer Enver Pasha, 1918, Batumi

Unrest during World War I led to Turkey re-entering on 12 February 1918. On 3 March 1918, now Soviet Russia granted the Muslim population of Batumi, Kars and Ardahan the right of self-determination under the Ottoman suzerainty. The Transcaucasian delegation attempted to reverse the clause on the Trabzon conference of 14 March-5 April 1918, but failed to achieve any results. On 14 April 1918, the Ottoman army annexed Batum. The two subsequent rounds of negotiations between Turkey and Transcaucasian republics were held from 11 to 26 May and from 31 May to 4 June 1918, when Turkey forced the newly independent Democratic Republic of Georgia into surrendering Batum, Ardahan, Akhaltsikhe and Akhalkalaki. In the context of anarchy spreading in the Caucasus, the Ottoman occupation was relatively well accepted by large parts of the local population, as demonstrated by available testimonies. Early in 1919, the British took over and appointed General James Cooke-Collis as the governor of Batumi. They also created the Batumi council under the presidency of the Russian cadet Prlidian Maslov. On 14 April 1919, the governor disbanded the council and left the city in July 1920, ceding the entire region to Georgia.

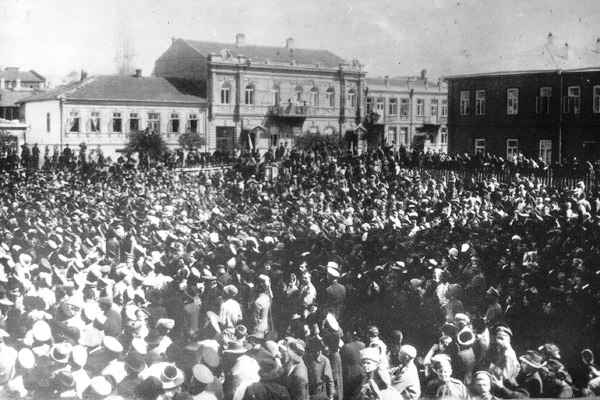
Demonstration in Batumi in 1917

Batumi was briefly occupied by Turkey during the Soviet invasion of Georgia in March 1921. On 18 March 1921, the city was recovered by Georgian troops, who then ceded its control to the arriving Soviets. Finally, in the treaty of Kars, Kemal Atatürk ceded Batumi to the Bolsheviks, on the condition that it be granted autonomy, for the sake of the Muslims among Batumi's mixed population. Thus, it became the capital of the Adjar ASSR within the Georgian SSR. During the 1924 August Uprising in Georgia, Batumi remained relatively quiet. On 31 August 1924, the local cell of the anti-Soviet underground organization was destroyed; its leaders, including major general Giorgi Purtseladze (then the chief of staff of the Batum fortifications), were shot. During World War II, the city sent 12,258 soldiers in the Soviet army, and 4,728 never returned home.

After the dissolution of the Soviet Union, Aslan Abashidze was appointed head of Adjara's governing council and subsequently held onto power throughout the unrest of the 1990s. Whilst other regions, such as Abkhazia, attempted to break away from the Georgian state, Adjara maintained an integral part of the Republic's territory. However, due to a fragile security situation, Abashidze was able to exploit the central government's weaknesses and rule the area as a personal fiefdom. In May 2004, he fled the region to Russia as a result of mass protests sparked by the Rose Revolution in Tbilisi.

== Present day ==
Batumi today is the main port of Georgia. It has the capacity for 80,000-tonne tankers to take materials such as oil. This oil originates from Azerbaijan and is shipped all over the world. Smaller oil exports also come from Kazakhstan and Turkmenistan. Additionally the city exports regional agricultural products. Since 1995 the freight conversion of the port has constantly risen, with an approximate 8 million tonnes in 2001. The annual revenue from the port is estimated at between $200 million and $300 million.

Since the change of power in Adjara, Batumi has attracted several international investors with real estate prices in the city trebling since 2001. Kazakh investors have reportedly invested $100 million to purchase more than 20 hotels in the Adjara region of Georgia. Construction of a number of new hotels will be launched in Adjara's Black Sea resorts starting from 2007.

Batumi was also host to the Russian 12th Military Base. Following the Rose Revolution, the central government pushed for the removal of these forces, and in 2005 an agreement with Moscow was reached. According to the agreement, the process of withdrawal was planned to be completed in a course of 2008, but the Batumi base was officially handed over to Georgia on 13 November 2007, ahead of planned schedule.
