= The Church of the Three Bishops of Kobuleti =

Church in Bobokvati, Georgia

The Church of the Three Bishops
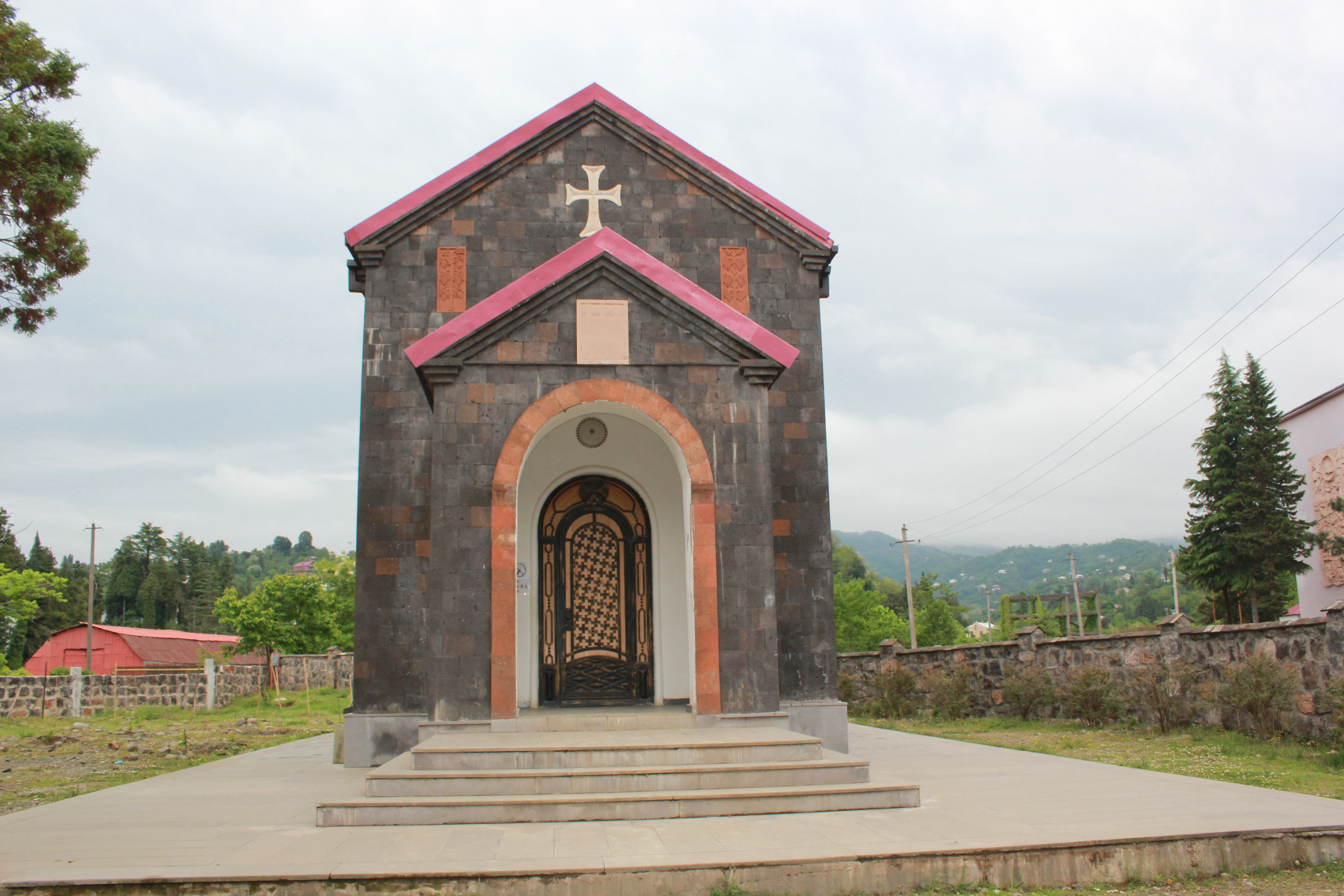
- The Church of the Three Bishops of Bobokvati

- Location within Adjara Location within Georgia

Religion
- Affiliation: Georgian Orthodox Church
- District: Kobuleti Municipality
- Province: Adjara
- Ecclesiastical or organizational status: Patriarchal cathedral
- Leadership: Ilia II of Georgia
- Year consecrated: 2009

Location
- Location: (Georgia (country)) Bobokvati, Kobuleti Municipality, Abkhazia, Georgia
- Interactive map of The Church of the Three Bishops
- Coordinates: 41°45′21″N 41°47′50″E

Architecture
- Type: Church
- Style: Triple-nave basilica
- Completed: 2009

The Church of the Three Bishops (Georgian: სამი მღვდელმთავრის სახელობის ეკლესია) St. Basil the Great, St. Gregory the Theologian and St. John Chrysostom is located in the village of Bobokvati. It houses the relics of 28 saints. The day of the temple is celebrated on 12 February.

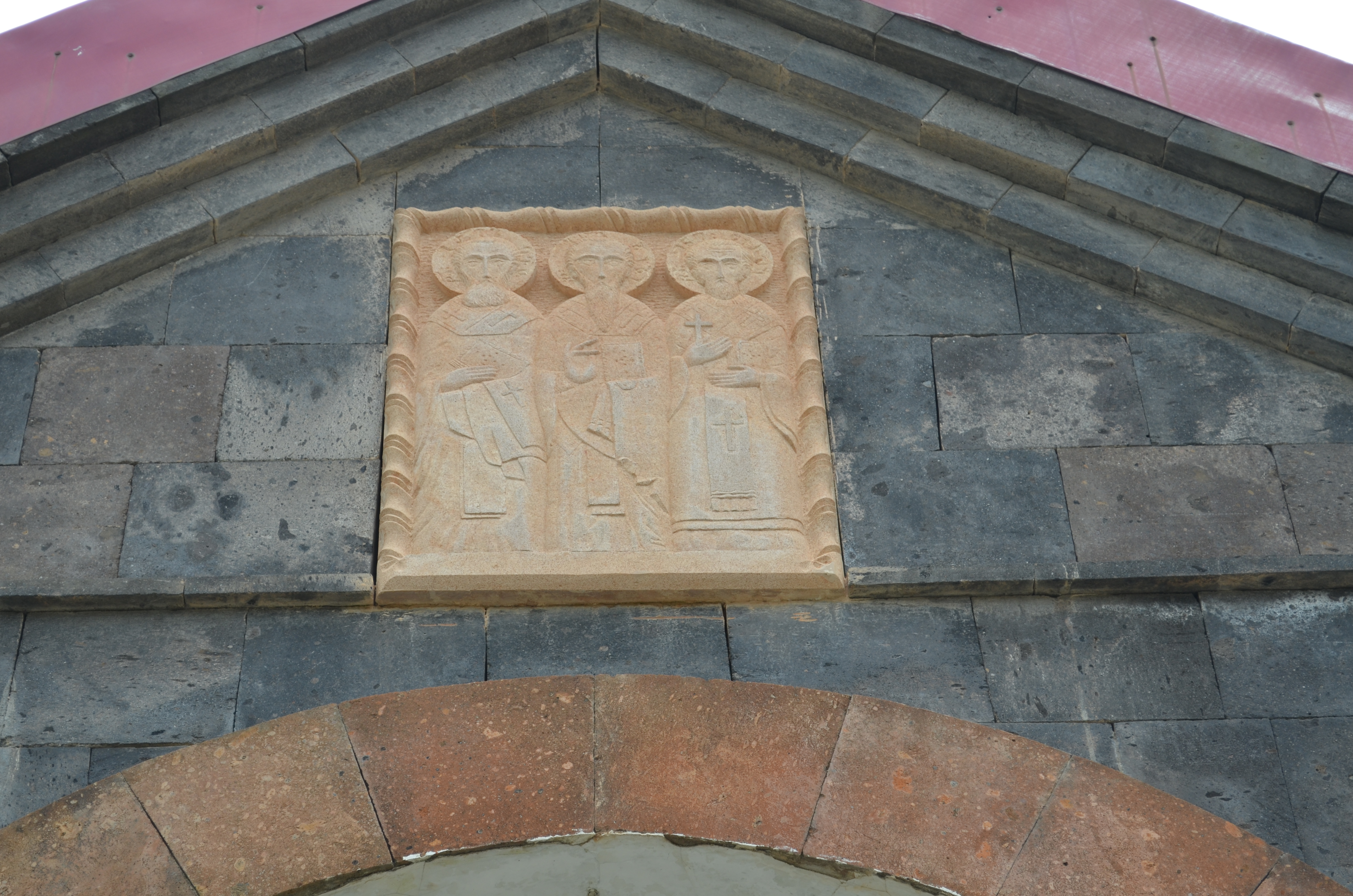
Three Holy Hierarchs

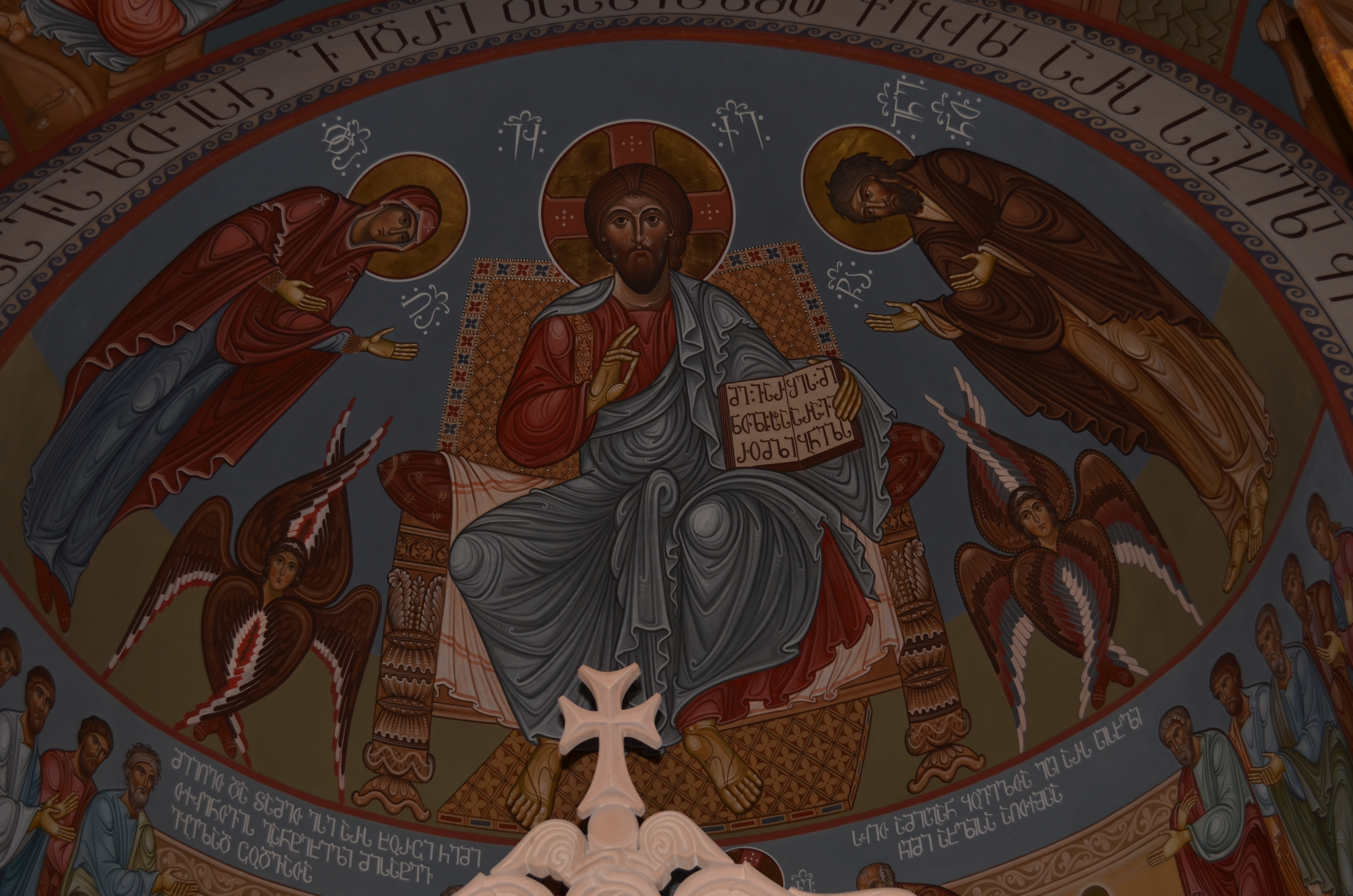
Church Interior

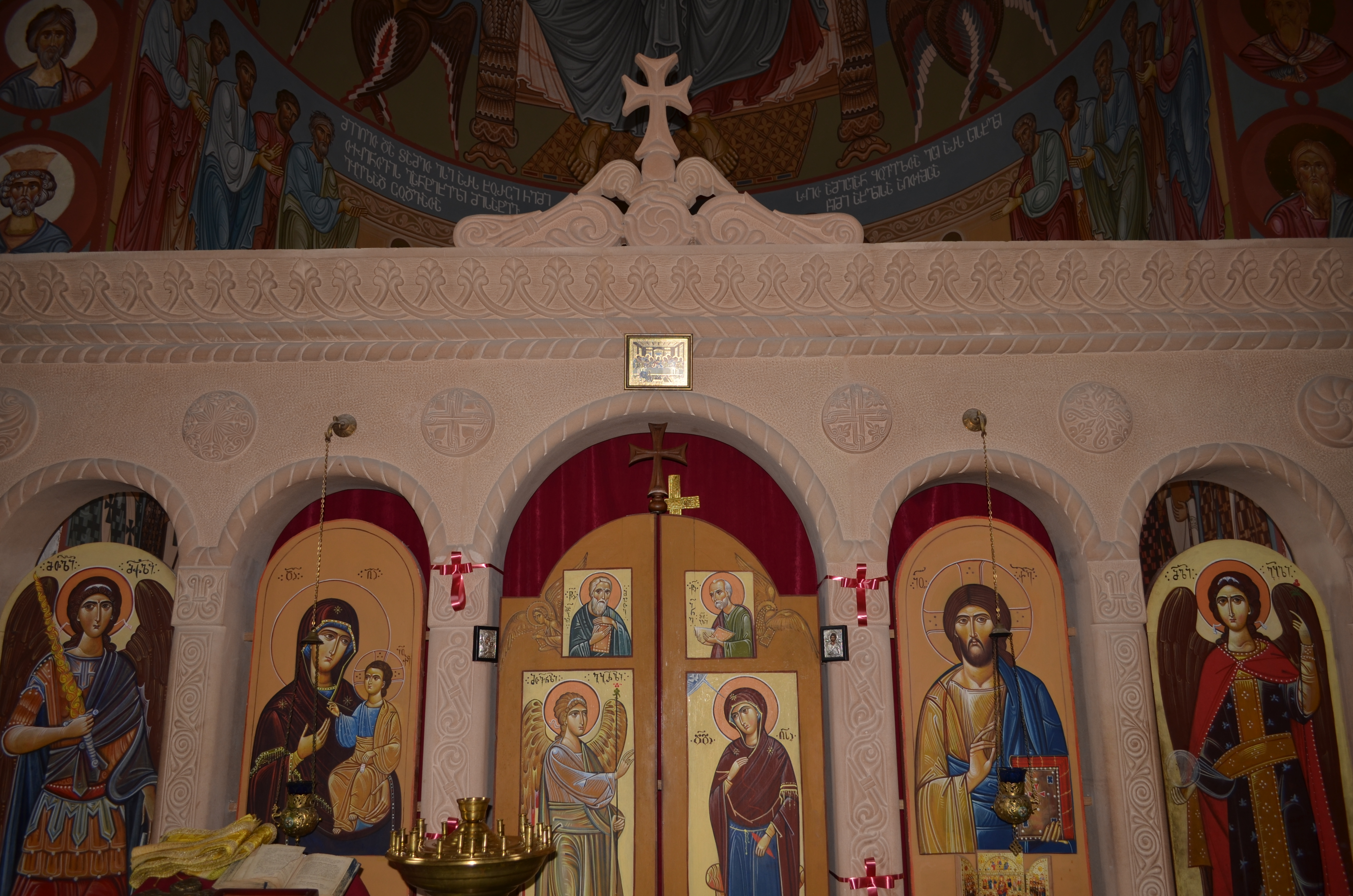
Church Interior and icon
