= Kobuleti Municipality =

Coordinates: 41°49′12″N 41°46′31″E

Kobuleti Municipality ქობულეთის მუნიციპალიტეტი
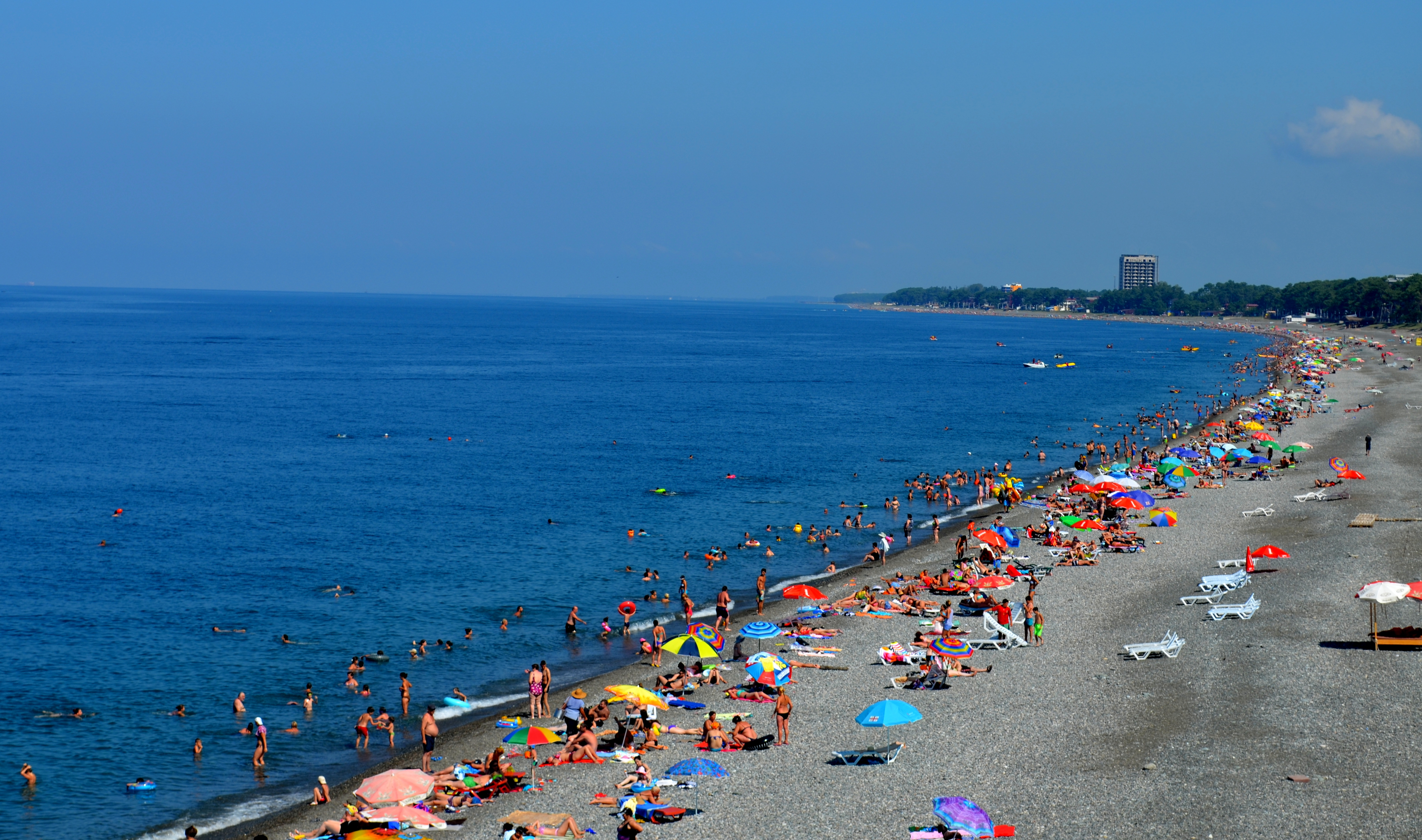
- Kobuleti Beach

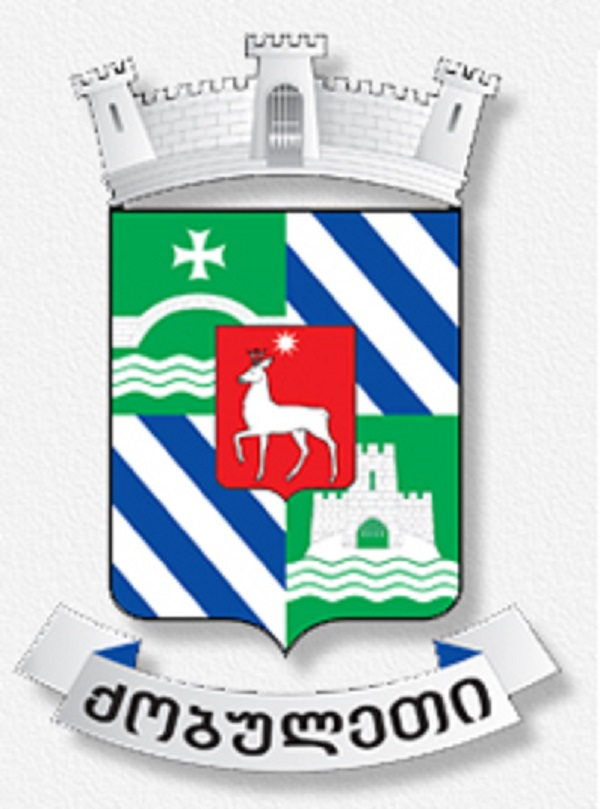
- Flag Seal

- Country: Georgia
- Autonomous Republic: Adjara
- Administrative centre: Kobuleti

Government
  - mayor: Levan Zoidze (GD)

Area
  - Total: 712 km^{2} (275 sq mi)

Population (2020)
  - Total: 104,013
  - Density: 146/km^{2} (378/sq mi)
- Time zone: UTC+4 (Georgian Time)
- Website: http://kobuleti.gov.ge

Kobuleti (Georgian: ქობულეთის მუნიციპალიტეტი) is a district of Georgia, in the autonomous republic of Adjara. Its main town is Kobuleti.

Since 1921, the municipality's territory has been included in the Kobuleti Mazra of the Autonomous Republic of Adjara. In 1930, it was formed as a separate district. In 1962-64, it was included in the Chakvi district, with the centre in the Chakvi borough. On 7 April 1964 the Chakvi district was abolished, and the Kobuleti district was re-established with the centre in the city of Kobuleti. This administrative status was maintained until the restoration of Georgia's independence. Since 2006, after the legislative reform of the self-government system, Kobuleti district has been renamed Kobuleti municipality. Contents

== History ==
Kobuleti municipality is a settlement with a centuries-old past. It has been inhabited since ancient times. Stone Age settlements, Early Bronze Age materials, Bronze Age archaeological monuments, ancient ruins, and other materials reflecting the richest historical past are abundantly found here. In the middle of the 17th century, Gurians granted Kobuleti and its surroundings to Tavdgiridzes, who owned it until the 70s of the 18th century. After the Kuchuk-Kainarji truce, the Ottoman Empire occupied Kvemo Guria and Kobuleti. During Ottoman rule, the city was given the Turkish name Çürüksu. Churuk-Su Kaza was created, which was included in the Sanjak of Lazistan.

After the Russo-Ottoman war in 1877-1878, Kobuleti, as well as the entire Adjara, was taken over by the Russian Empire. In the second half of the 19th century, Kobuleti became an elite resort. By decree of the Russian Emperor Alexander II, the coastal part was given to the commanders-in-chief who distinguished themselves during the Russian-Turkish operation. High-ranking officials began developing the coastal Kobuleti coastal area with luxurious country houses. The healthy climate of Kobuleti became known in just a few years.

After the Sovietization of Georgia, the houses of the aristocrats came under the ownership of the red commissars. In 1923, Kobuleti received the status of a resort and in 1944, the status of a city.

During the Soviet period, the Kobuleti district was one of the most important centres of citrus and tea production and processing throughout the Soviet Union, supplemented by other agricultural production such as horticulture, cattle breeding, sericulture, and beekeeping. Kobuleti district has gained popularity as a resort destination due to its beach and warm summer. Eco-tourism in the Kintrish Nature Reserve was also developed.

== Administrative divisions and population ==
Kobuleti Municipality is a self-governing entity with administrative boundaries and an administrative centre - the city of Kobuleti. Self-governing bodies of the municipality are represented by the municipal council and the mayor's office. Kobuleti Municipality includes 21 territorial units. Settlements consist of one city Kobuleti, two boroughs, and 17 other territorial bodies, which include 48 villages. The population is 70,700 people, and the average density is 126.5 people per 1 km².

=== Settlements ===
#	Name of the administrative entity	Villages and Settlements	Population		Area
1	Kobuleti town	Kobuleti town	16 546	16 546	14,99
2	Ochkhamuri borough	Ochkhamuri	5355	5355	25,25
2	Ochkhamuri borough	Tsetskhlauri	5355	5355	25,25
2	Ochkhamuri borough	Jikhanjuri	5355	5355	25,25
3	Chakvi borough	Chakvi	6720	8574	19,66
3	Chakvi borough	Buknari village	1166	8574	19,66
3	Chakvi borough	Sakhalvasho village	688	8574	19,66
4	Alambari	Alambari village	1837	2145	11,1
4	Alambari	Zemo Kondidi village	308	2145	11,1
5	Achkhvistavi	Achkvistavi village	1 057	1057	8,09
6	Bobokvati	Bobokvati village	2 282	2 817	9,05
6	Bobokvati	Qvemo Dagva	545	2 817	9,05
7	Gvara	Gvara Village	1089	1409	5,23
7	Gvara	Kvemo Kondidi village	320	1409	5,23
8	Dagva	Dagva village	2032	2032	8,87
9	Zeniti	Zeniti village	764	764	3,76
10	Kvirike	Kvirike village	1921	4119	19,19
10	Kvirike	Zemo Kvirike village	490	4119	19,19
10	Kvirike	Kvemo Kvirike village	1699	4119	19,19
11	Leghva	Leghva village	2081	3182	15,09
11	Leghva	Skura village	403	3182	15,09
11	Leghva	Tskhraphona village	698	3182	15,09
12	Mukhaestate	Mukhaestate village	2045	2045	8,84
13	Sachino	Sachino village	758	2931	8,96
13	Sachino	Zemo Achkva village	1037	2931	8,96
13	Sachino	Kvemo Achkkva village	1136	2931	8,96
14	Kakuti	Kakuti village	1211	1621	21,25
14	Kakuti	Achi village	253	1621	21,25
14	Kakuti	Gogmachauri village	53	1621	21,25
14	Kakuti	Natskhvataevi village	104	1621	21,25
15	Kobuleti	Tsikhisdziri village	2 472	4 162	10,46
15	Kobuleti	Stalinis ubani village	956	4 162	10,46
15	Kobuleti	Shuaghele village	734	4 162	10,46
16	Chaisubani	Chaisubani village	2 847	2 847	12,32
17	Tskavroka	Tskavroka village			
18	Chakhati	Chakhati village	390	610	26,92
18	Chakhati	Didvake village	-	610	26,92
18	Chakhati	Varjanuli village	-	610	26,92
18	Chakhati	Kakucha village	0	610	26,92
18	Chakhati	Kachieti village	78	610	26,92
18	Chakhati	Kobalauri village	-	610	26,92
18	Chakhati	Okhtomi village	121	610	26,92
18	Chakhati	Tkemakravi village	-	610	26,92
18	Chakhati	Khino village	-	610	26,92
19	Khala	Khala village	1503	2861	18,73
19	Khala	Gorgadzeebi village	1298	2861	18,73
19	Khala	Chakvistavi village	60	2861	18,73
20	Khutsubani	Khutsubani Village	3483	5084	16,87
20	Khutsubani	Nakaidzeebi village	672	5084	16,87
20	Khutsubani	Kvemo Sameba village	929	5084	16,87

== Geography and climate ==
Protected areas of Kobuleti

Kobuleti municipality is located 10 m above sea level. Its area is 711.8 sq. km. The average annual temperature is 13–15 °C. The average amount of precipitation is 2500–3000 mm per year. The climate is subtropical.

The municipality is located in the southwestern part of Georgia and in the northern part of the Autonomous Republic of Adjara. It is located between the Black Sea, the Cholok River and the Meskheti Range. The municipality borders Ozurgeti municipality from the north (border length 55 km), Khelvachauri municipality from the southwest (border length 24 km), Keda municipality from the south (border length 33 km), Shuakhevi municipality from the southeast (border length 21 km). The length of the coastal line is 24 km. The municipality occupies an area of 711.8 km². Twenty-one thousand one hundred seventy thousand square meters of land is used for agricultural and residential purposes, which is 29.4% of the entire municipality. Protected areas cover 30,252 hectares which are 42% of the entire municipality.

== Politics ==
Kobuleti Municipal Assembly (Georgian: ქობულეთის საკრებულო, Kobuletis Sakrebulo) is a representative body in Kobuleti Municipality, consisting of 39 members which is elected every four years. The last election was held in October 2021. Levan Zoidze of Georgian Dream was elected mayor.

Party	2017	2021	Current Municipal Assembly
Georgian Dream	29	24	
United National Movement	6	13	
For Georgia		1	
Independent		1 (Note: Shota Gogitidze - expelled from For Georgia.)	
Alliance of Patriots	1		
European Georgia	1		
Total	37	39	

== Education ==
There are 29 preschools and 46 public and three private schools in Kobuleti municipality. As of 2022, 3,300 children are enrolled in preschools, and 12,500 students study in schools. JSC Kobuleti Culture Centre and its library department, as well as a student youth house, are functioning in the municipality. There is a college Akhali Talgha in the municipality.

== Culture ==
In Kobuleti Municipality is functioning Kobuleti Museum, which combines expositions on the history of education, cultural history, history and archaeology of Kobuleti, and ethnography. The works of artist and sculptor Vazha Verulidze are exhibited here.

The following institutions operate on the territory of the municipality:

- Folk ensemble Kobuleti
- Guram Tamazashvili song and dance ensemble Mkhedruli
- Children's choreographic ensemble Saunje
- Folk instruments school Changi
- New Rhythms, a club for learning rhythmic dances
- Choirmaster department
- Kakuti choreographic ensemble
- Suliko ensemble, named after S. Mamulaishvili
- Alilo vocal group at the Leghva Rural Club
- Vakhtanguri ensemble in Dagva
- Adilo vocal group in Alambari Rural Club
- Shvarden vocal ensemble in Khala Culture House
- The vocal group at the Tsikhisdziri House of Culture
- Choreographic ensemble Sikharuli in Zedi Achkva.
- Choreographic ensemble Choloki
- Choreographic Ensemble Chakura at the Kobuleti Rural Club
- Choreographic ensemble Taiguli in Tsetskhlauri.

Every year in February, the public reading day is celebrated in Kobuleti.

=== Festivals and public holidays ===
Event	Date	Description
"The Sun Shines in the Countryside"	July	The festival aims to popularize rural tourism. Visitors can learn about local culture, see the exhibitions, taste dishes characteristic of local cuisine, and buy products and souvenirs. As part of the festival, sports and culinary competitions and concerts are organized.
Summer Festival	July	Every year at the beginning of summer, Kobuleti hosts a summer festival, the main goal of which is to create a summer, relaxing and fun mood. Local and guest bands and DJs create a fun atmosphere for the festival guests throughout the day. Various summer activities are taking place in parallel with the concert. There is a special corner for children, where animators prepare a lot of interesting games for the little guests of the festival. There are seasonal open cafes on the beach, where you can taste different types of Georgian and European, as well as traditional Kobuletian food and sweets. Fire and balloon shows, bonfires on the beach, thousands of colourful helium balloons into the sky, and the beautiful fireworks make the festival more colourful.
International Bird Watching Festival	September - October	The festival brings together ornithologists and bird watchers from different countries, who have the opportunity to observe more than a million birds of prey migrating through the world's third-largest migration corridor. At the same time, lectures and seminars are held by local and invited specialists.
"Chakvistavoba"	September	The public festival Chakvistavoba is celebrated in the village of Chakvistavi every year, where concerts and sports competitions in backgammon and arm wrestling are held, and an exhibition of handicrafts is organized. Local vocal-choreographic ensembles, individual performers, local entrepreneurs and athletes participate in the event.
"Mandarinoba"	November	Every year in November, the Mandarinoba festival is organized, which combines the tradition of citrus harvesting and the field of hospitality. At the festival, guests can pick mandarins in the citrus garden, make lemonade, attend Georgian cooking master classes and listen to live music.

== Sport ==
JSC "Kobuleti Sports School" operates in Kobuleti Municipality, which has the following sports infrastructure:

- A well-equipped mini-football stadium with an artificial cover
- Two wrestling halls in the city of Kobuleti and the village of Kvirike
- Two bicycle cabinets
- Chess cabinet

== Tourism ==
There is a tourism information centre in the municipality, which provides foreign and local visitors with the necessary information about attractions, tourist infrastructure, architectural and archaeological monuments, cultural events, festivals, public holidays, protected areas, transport, and other issues. The centre also helps visitors plan their preferred tours.

Types of tourism in the municipality

- Marine tourism
- Ecotourism
- Medical tourism
- Cultural tourism
- Sports tourism
- Rural tourism
- Scientific tourism
- Pilgrimage tourism
- Adventure tourism
- Culinary tourism

== Economy ==
The leading sectors of the economy are tourism and agriculture. Employment sectors are both public and private. Tourism in rural areas is in the stage of development. The main areas of agriculture are citrus growing, tea growing, horticulture, and animal husbandry. Small processing and food industry enterprises operate in the municipality. Service and trade are the most advanced in the municipality.

== Historical landmarks and sightseeing ==
Kintrish protected areas, Mtirala National Park and Kobuleti protected areas are located on the territory of the municipality. Important historical monuments on the territory of the municipality are Petra Fortress, Mamuka Fortress, Chekhedana Church, Khinotsminda Monastery, Kvirike Mosque, Tetrosani Monastery, Elia Fortress, Pichvnari Ancient Settlement and others. The Church of the Three Bishops of Kobuleti, located in Bobokvati, houses the relics of 28 saints.

== Notable people ==
Photo	Name	Years	Description
	Fadiko Gogitidze	1916-1940	Adajara's first woman pilot
	Davit Khakhutaishvili	1924-1999	Georgian historian, archaeologist, member-correspondent of the Georgian Academy of Sciences
	David Evgenidze	1958	Georgian composer and musician
	Mamia Kharazi	1936-1996	Famous bibliographer and public figure
	Irakli Turmanidze	1984	Weightlifter. 2016 Rio de Janeiro Olympic Games bronze medalist.
	Nino Katamadze	1972	Georgian jazz singer and songwriter
	Zurab Gorgiladze	1937-2006	Georgian poet
	Giorgi Tkhilaishvili	1991	Rugby player, and forward of the Georgian national rugby team
	Revaz Chelebadze	1955	Georgian and Soviet football player, striker
	Jano Ananidze	1992	Football player, and member of the Georgian national team

== Twin towns – sister Municipalities ==
City	Country	Region	Area	Population	Postal Code	Website
Kielce	Poland	Świętokrzyskie	109,6 km²	199 475	25001-25900	http://www.um.kielce.pl
Pivdenne	Ukraine	Odesa	10,42 km²	32,745	65481—65489	http://www.yuzhny.org/
Palanga	Lithuania	Klaipėda County	79 km²	17 632	00100-00103	palanga.lt
Rivne	Ukraine	Rivne Oblast	63.00 km^{2}	245,289	33000	city-adm.rv.ua
Alaverdi	Armenia	Lori Province	18 km²	13,186	1701-1708	http://www.alaverdi.am/
Narva	Estonia	Ida-Viru county	84.54 km^{2}	54,409	20001 to 21020	https://www.narva.ee
Varna	Bulgaria	Northern Bulgaria region	238 km^{2}	332,686	9000	www.varna.bg
Priekule	Latvia	South Kurzeme Municipality	5.42 km^{2}	1851	LV-3434	http://www.priekule.lv/
Tartu	Estonia	Tartu	38.80 km^{2}	91407	50050 to 51111	https://tartu.ee/en
Terracina	Italy	Latina	136 km^{2}	45,850	4019	https://comune.terracina.lt.it
Piekary Śląskie	Poland	Silesia	39.98 km^{2}	54,226	41–940 to 41–949	http://www.piekary.pl/
Oborniki	Poland	Oborniki	14.08 km^{2}	17,850	17,850	https://www.oborniki.pl
Selçuk	Turkey	Izmir	279.85 km^{2}	37,689	35920	www.selcuk.bel.tr
Gurjaani	Georgia	Kakheti	846.0 კმ²	8024	1500	gurjaani.ge
Myrnohrad	Ukraine	Donetsk Oblast	23 km^{2}	55800	85320-85326	https://myrnograd-rada.gov.ua/
Babruysk	Belarus	Mogilev	83.86 km^{2}	209,675	213801-213830	bobruisk.by
Akhtala	Armenia	Lori	4.3 km²	2,092	1709-1711	http://www.akhtala.am/Pages/Home/Default.aspx

== Gallery ==
Kobuleti view

Kobuleti view

Kobuleti entrance

Kobuleti Boulevard

Kobuleti village

Didvake village

Khutsubani village

Tsikhisdziri beach

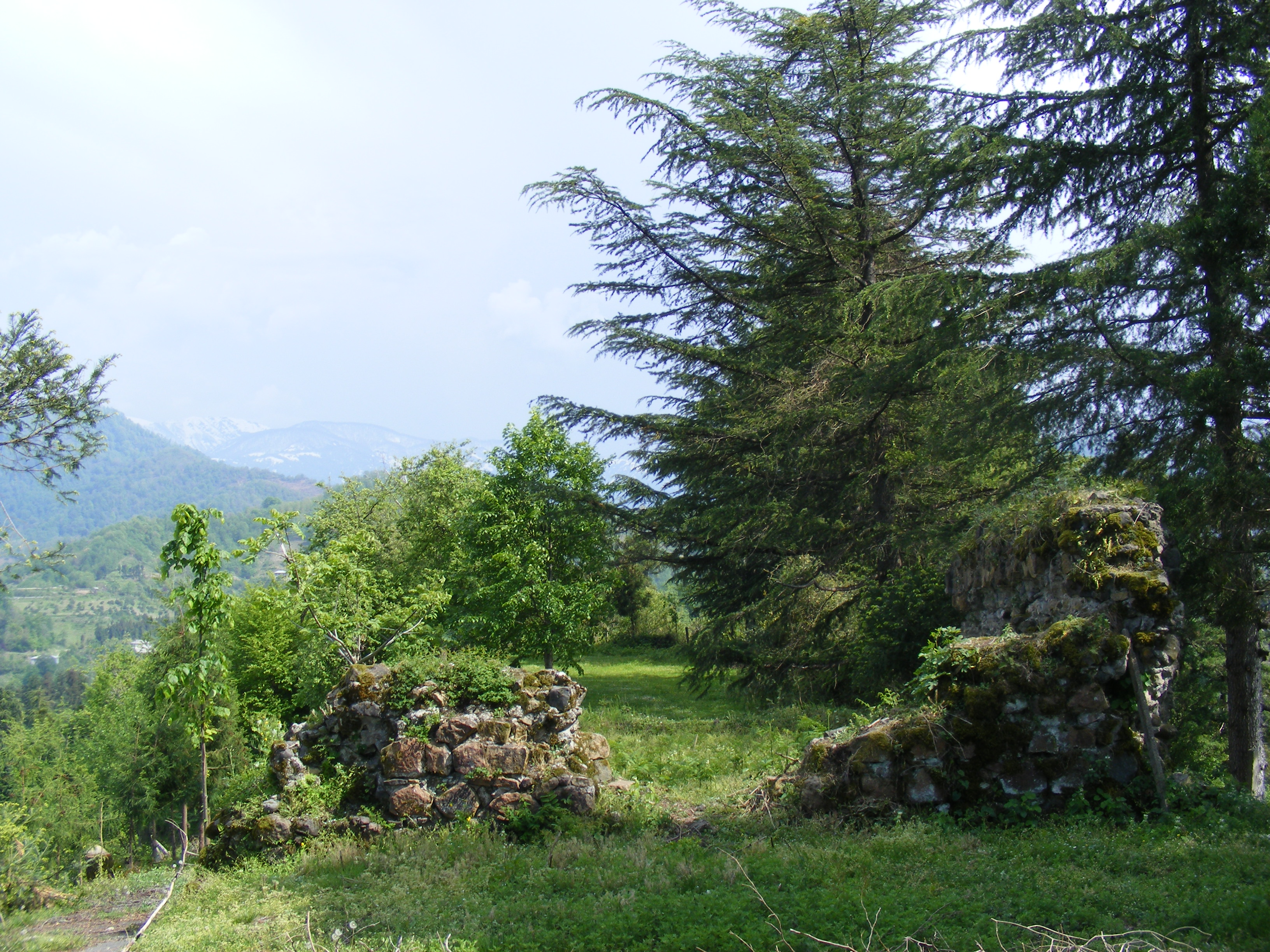
Mamuka Castle

Petra Castle

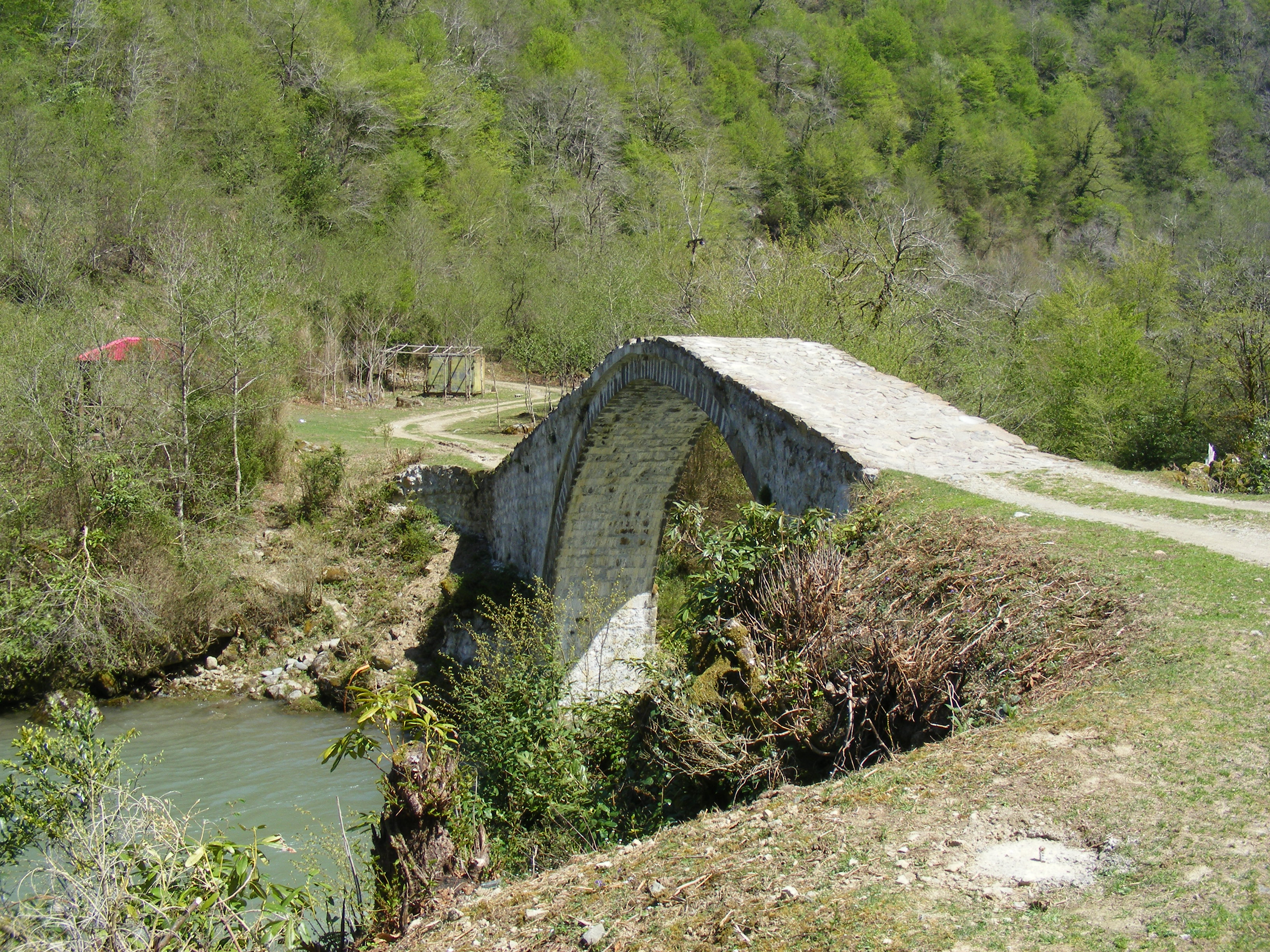
Varjanauli bridge

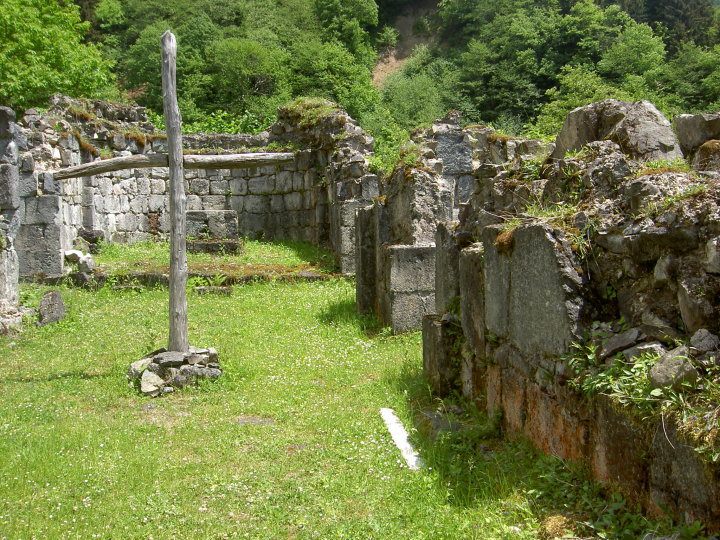
Khinotsminda

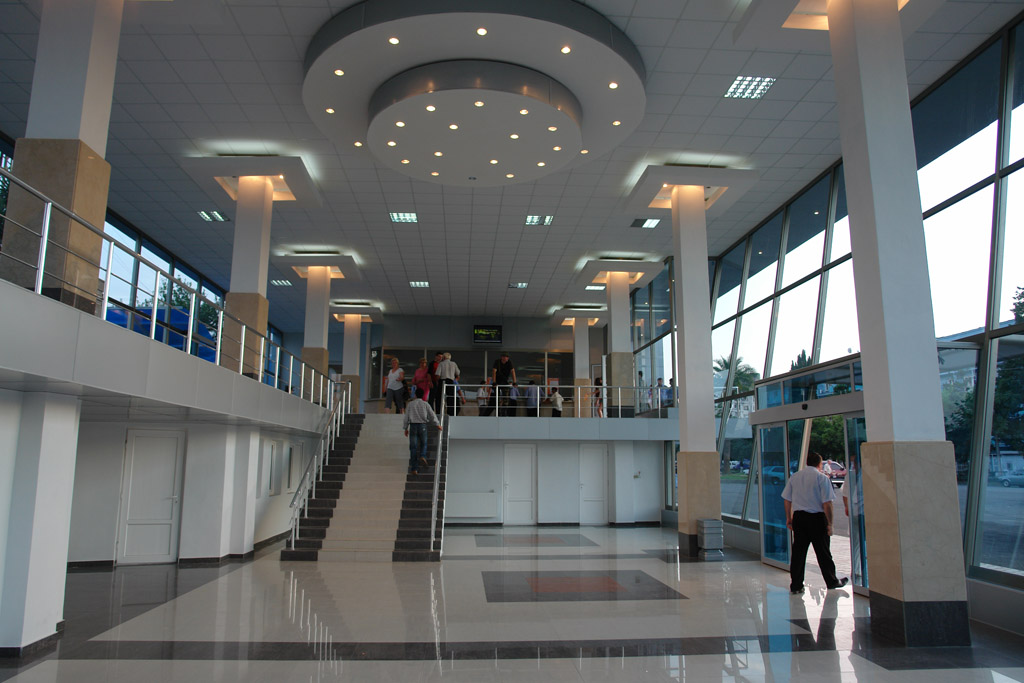
Kobuleti railway station

Kintrish Conservation Area

Mtirala National Park

Protected areas of Kobuleti

Mtirala National Park

Varjanuli village

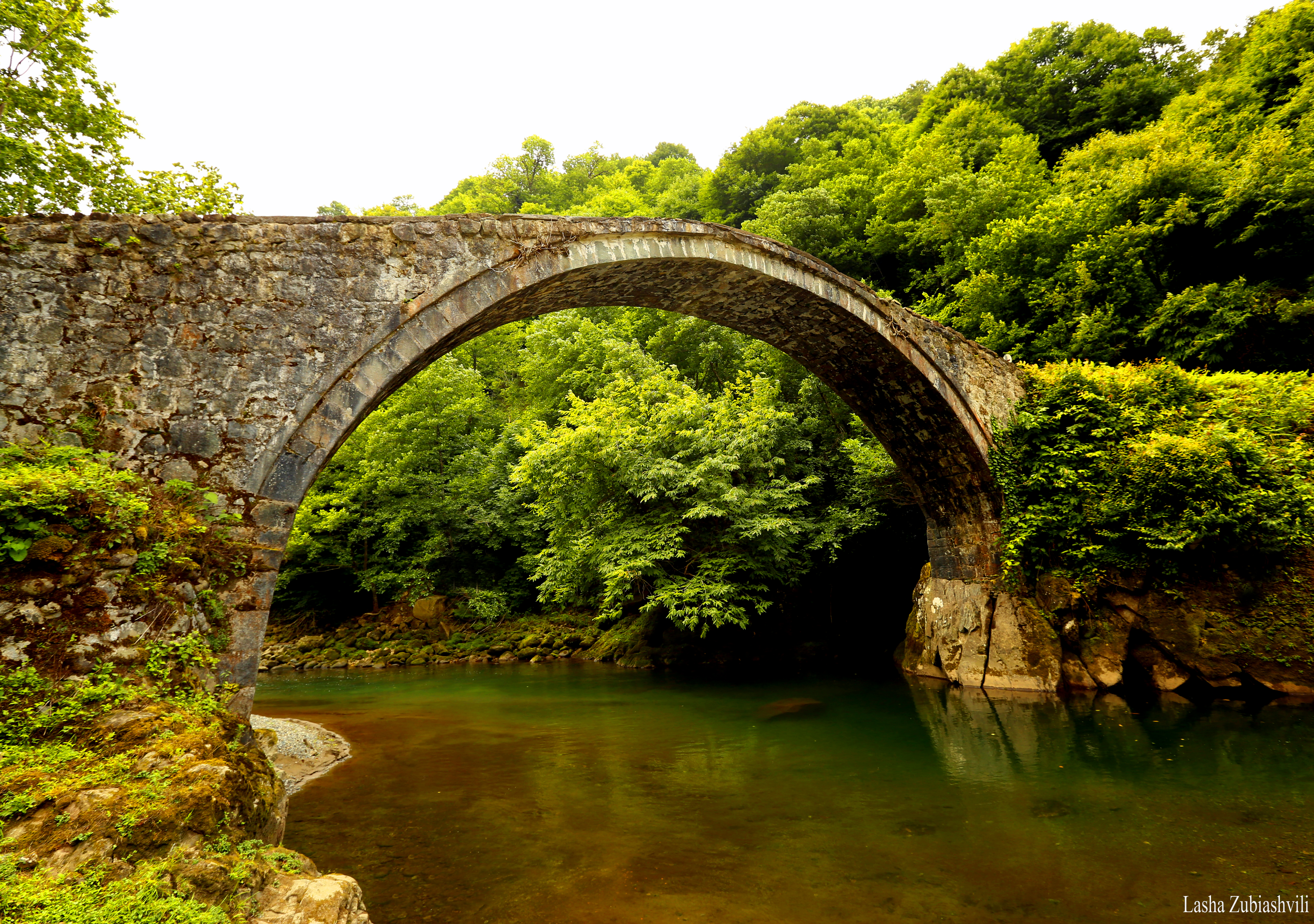
Tkemakrav Wave Bridge

Kobuleti Museum

Kobuleti Museum

== See also ==
- List of municipalities in Georgia (country)
