= 12th Military Base =

- Active: 1941–2007
- Country: Soviet Union; Russia
- Branch: Soviet Army (Red Army before 1946); Russian Ground Forces
- Type: Infantry
- Part of: Russian Transcaucasus Group of Forces (1992–2007)
- Garrison/HQ: Batumi (from 1958)

The 12th Military Base (Russian: 12-я военная база) was a Russian military base in Batumi, Georgia that existed between 1994 and 2007, when Russian troops withdrew from Georgia. The base was formed from the 145th Motor Rifle Division, which was based in Batumi for much of the Cold War.

== History ==
The 12th Military Base was formed as the 55th Fortified Region in accordance with an order of the Transcaucasian Military District of 12 May 1941. Stationed at Leninakan, the headquarters of the fortified region was formed from the 83rd Separate Machine Gun Battalion. The formation of the fortified region was completed by 20 July, and it initially included the 83rd and 128th Separate Machine Gun Battalions, the 58th and 59th Separate Machine Gun Companies, the 531st Separate Communications Battalion, 314th Separate Sapper Battalion, and 377th Separate Transport Company. The fortified region was tasked with covering the Turkish border from Chakhmakh to Karavabad, the Leninakan sector. As a result of its assignment the unit did not see action in World War II. On 25 February 1943, the 59th Separate Machine Gun Company was relocated to Karakala and transferred to the 69th Fortified Region, and the 55th Fortified Region formed the 141st Separate Machine Gun Artillery Battalion as a replacement. During 1942 and 1943 the fortified region also included the 84th, 202nd and 146th Flamethrower Companies of which the 84th and 146th were disbanded and the 202nd relocated to Baku. By September 1943 the region included the 34th Separate Flamethrower Company. According to a September 1943 report, the ethnic composition of the fortified region was 40.5 percent Armenian, 35 percent Russian, 9.5 percent Ukrainian, and 4.9 percent Georgian with the majority of the rest from other North- and Trans-Caucasian ethnicities. Lieutenant Colonel Vladimir Gal, later promoted to colonel, commanded the unit from 10 February 1942 to September 1947.

In July 1946, the 55th Fortified Region was reorganized as the 17th Machine Gun Artillery Brigade, becoming part of the 7th Guards Army. Its existence as a brigade proved brief as it was reorganized as the 17th Machine Gun Artillery Division just a few months later on 13 August. The division was reorganized as the 145th Mountain Rifle Division in 1951. The 145th Mountain Rifle Division was relocated to Batumi in 1958, replacing the disbanded 146th Motor Rifle Division there as part of the 31st Army Corps. The division was reorganized as the 145th Motor Rifle Division on 9 May 1961.

It comprised the 35th Guards, 87th, 90th, 1358th Motorized Rifle Regiments and 114th Independent Tank Battalion in 1989-90.

The division's installations lined the main roads of Khelvachauri, with at least two barracks blocks, military family housing, and what appears to be a vehicle park or ammunition storage facility which has been hollowed out of gently rolling terrain and camouflaged. There is also a military training area on the coast at Akhalsopeli just south of the Batumi airport.

It was renamed the 12th Military Base on May 15, 1992, according to the Collective Security Treaty. The renaming under the Collective Security Treaty took effect on 1 September 1994.

In late 1999, the base had 1,790 personnel and included the 35th (Batumi) and the 90th (Khelvachauri) motor rifle regiments; the 809th artillery regiment (Batumi); the 122nd communications battalion (Medjinistzqali); the 61st artillery detachment (Batumi); and the 773rd reconnaissance battalion (Medjinistzqali). An unnamed Russian Defence Ministry official, speaking to ITAR-TASS on 29 March 2004, said that the two bases had reduced their personnel – "if there were over 2,000 servicemen at each Russian base at the beginning of 2003, now there are at least 1,000 servicemen." The reorganization had also meant the disbandment of units at the bases that did not carry out direct combat missions.

Following several years of tense negotiations, Russia agreed, in March 2005, to complete the withdrawal of the base from Batumi before the end of 2008. However, the base was officially handed over to Georgia on 13 November 2007, ahead of planned schedule.

== Commanders ==
The following officers commanded the division:

- Major General Ivan Makarovich Matyukhin (26 March 1947–30 April 1948)
- Major General Nikolay Zakharovich Galay (30 April 1948–8 August 1951)
- Major General Timofey Dmitrievich Dudorov (8 August 1951–10 January 1953)
- Colonel Vladimir Dmitrievich Gal (10 January–6 November 1953)
- Colonel Aleksandr Yakovlevich Klimenko (6 November 1953–23 November 1954, promoted major general 31 May 1954)
- Major General Vasily Andreyevich Malykh (23 November 1954–20 November 1955)
- Major General Ivan Semyonovich Lukyanenko (20 November 1955–18 December 1957)
- Colonel Vladimir Mitrofanovich Kazak (18 December 1957–17 September 1958)
- Colonel Leonid Timofeyevich Bastrygin (17 September 1958–15 August 1959)
- Major General Zelimkhan Arsenovich Kharebov (15 August 1959–10 April 1964)
- Colonel Pyotr Aleksandrovich Ivanov (10 April 1964–9 September 1965, promoted major general 13 April 1964)
- Colonel Nikolay Fyodorovich Komarov (9 September 1965–12 May 1968, promoted major general 25 October 1967)
- Major General Aleksandr Fyodorovich Mishagin (23 May 1968–2 August 1971)
- Colonel Vasily Grigoryevich Popkov (2 August 1971–6 June 1974, promoted to major general 4 November 1971)
- Colonel Boris Yevgenyevich Pyankov (6 June 1974–13 July 1977, promoted to major general 5 May 1976)
