= Mukhaestate =

Mukhaestate მუხაესტატე
- Village
- Location within Georgia
- Coordinates: 41°50′31″N 41°51′59″E
- Country: Georgia
- Autonomous Republic: Adjara
- Municipality: Kobuleti
- Elevation: 60 m (200 ft)

Population (2014)
  - Total: 2,045
- Time zone: UTC+4 (Georgian Time)

Mukhaestate (Georgian: მუხაესტატე) is a village located in the west part of Georgia, in the Kobuleti municipality in the Adjarian autonomous region. The village is 60 metres above sea level, near the Achkva River. In 2014, 2,045 people lived in the village. Mukhaestate is 36.9 kilometers north of Batumi and approximately 315 km west of the nation's capital, Tbilisi.

== Notable people ==
- Nino Katamadze - jazz singer.
- Jano Ananidze - footballer

== See also ==
- Adjara
