= Karakala, Kotayk =

Karakala
- Location within Armenia
- Coordinates: 40°38′N 44°33′E
- Country: Armenia
- Marz (Province): Kotayk
- Time zone: UTC+4 ( )
  - Summer (DST): UTC+5 ( )

Karakala is a town in the Kotayk Province of Armenia.

== See also ==
- Kotayk Province
