= Karakala, Lori =

Karakala
- Location within Armenia
- Coordinates: 41°06′37″N 44°08′31″E
- Country: Armenia
- Marz (Province): Lori
- Time zone: UTC+4 ( )
  - Summer (DST): UTC+5 ( )

Karakala is a town in the Lori Province of Armenia.
