= Sevaberd =

Sevaberd Սևաբերդ
- Location within Armenia
- Coordinates: 40°16′39″N 44°47′54″E
- Country: Armenia
- Marz (Province): Kotayk
- Elevation: 2,058 m (6,752 ft)

Population (2011)
  - Total: 211
- Time zone: UTC+4 ( )
  - Summer (DST): UTC+5 ( )

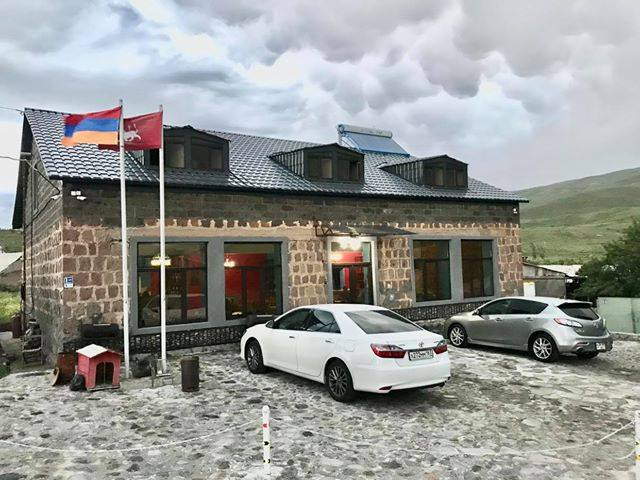
Adventure tourism in Sevaberd

Sevaberd (Armenian: Սևաբերդ; formerly, Karakala) is a village in the Kotayk Province of Armenia.

== See also ==
- Kotayk Province
