= Qaraqala =

- Municipality
- Location within Azerbaijan
- Coordinates: 39°17′25″N 45°28′11″E
- Country: Azerbaijan
- Autonomous republic: Nakhchivan
- District: Babek

Population (2005)
  - Total: 568
- Time zone: UTC+4 (AZT)

Qaraqala (also, Garagala and Kara-kala) is a village and municipality in the Babek District of Nakhchivan, Azerbaijan. It is located 15 km in the north from the district center, on the plain. Its population is busy with grain-growing, gardining, poultry and animal husbandry. There are secondary school, club, library, mosque and a medical center in the village. It has a population of 568.

== Qaraqala ==
Qaraqala - is the settlement of the Bronze and Iron Ages in the vicinity of a village with the same name, in the Babek region, on the left bank of the Nakhchivanchay River. It was recorded in 1954. The area is 3 ha. From the settlement were collected many fragments of the gray and red clay pots, obsidian and fragments of the flint. According to the findings, can say that the houses were built of bricks on the stone foundations. The cultural layer consists from the layers of soil mixed with ash and various archaeological materials. Here, were discovered fragments of clay pots, mortar and pestle, graters etc. The materials are stored in the Nakhchivan State History Museum. According to the findings, the monument belongs to the 2-1 millennium of BC.

== Qaraqala Necropolis ==
Qaraqala Necropolis - is an archaeological monument of the Middle Ages (10th-19th centuries) near the village of Qaraqala of the Babek region. From the Necropol were discovered the artifacts which is typical for the medieval era of the Nakhchivan.
