= Karakala, Armavir =

Village in Armavir, Armenia

Karakala
- Location within Armenia
- Coordinates: 40°03′01″N 43°51′59″E
- Country: Armenia
- Marz (Province): Armavir
- Time zone: UTC+4 ( )
  - Summer (DST): UTC+5 ( )

Karakala is a village in the Armavir Province of Armenia.

== See also ==
- Armavir Province
