= Maghali Etseri =

Maghali Etseri მაღალი ეწერი
- Village
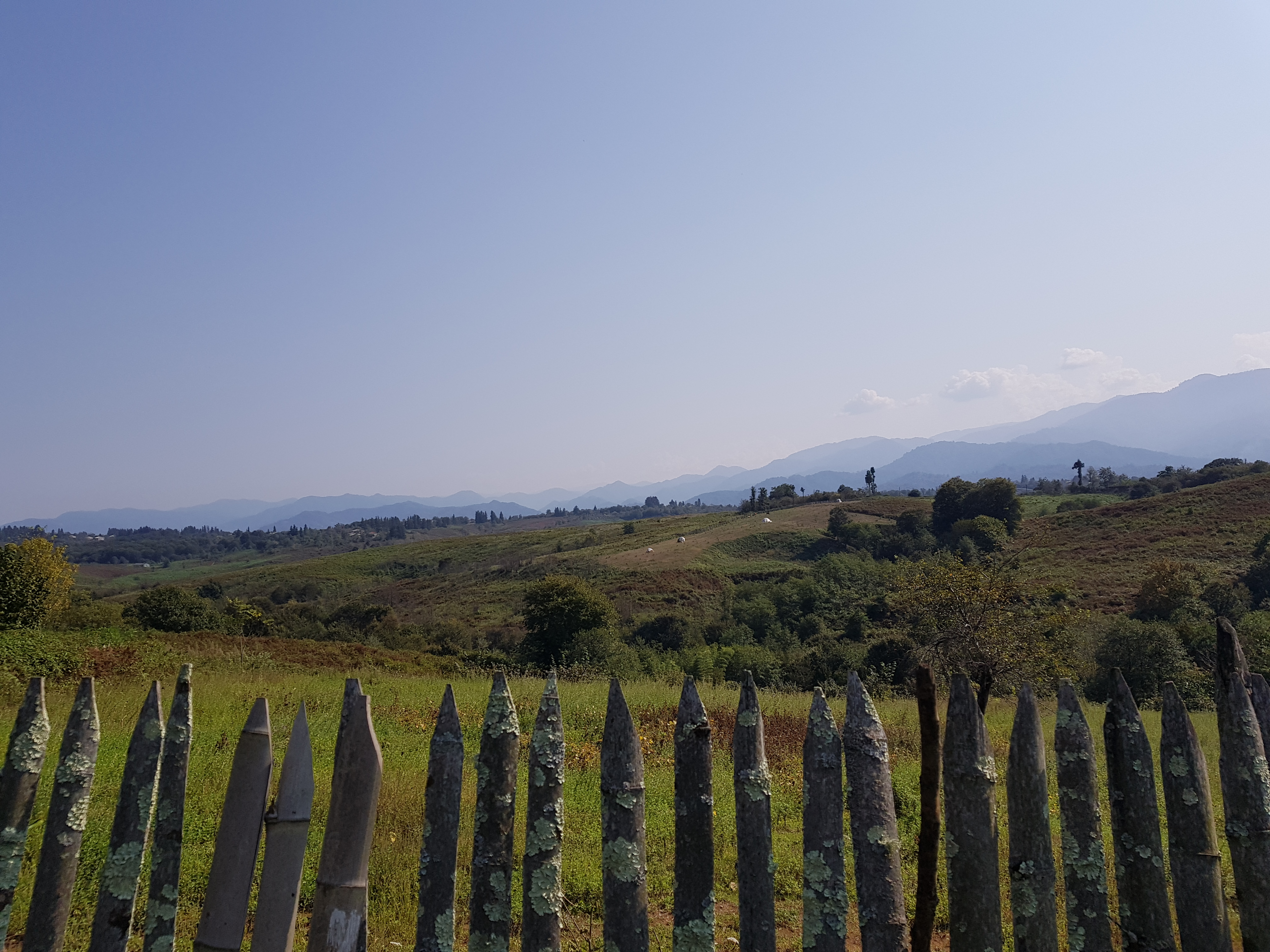

- Location within Georgia Location within Guria
- Coordinates: 41°58′21″N 42°07′39″E
- Country: Georgia
- Mkhare: Guria
- Municipality: Ozurgeti
- Elevation: 200 m (660 ft)

Population (2014)
  - Total: 129
- Time zone: UTC+4 (Georgian Time)

Maghali Etseri (Georgian: მაღალი ეწერი) is a village in the Ozurgeti Municipality of Guria in western Georgia.
