= Baileti =

Baileti ბაილეთი
- Village
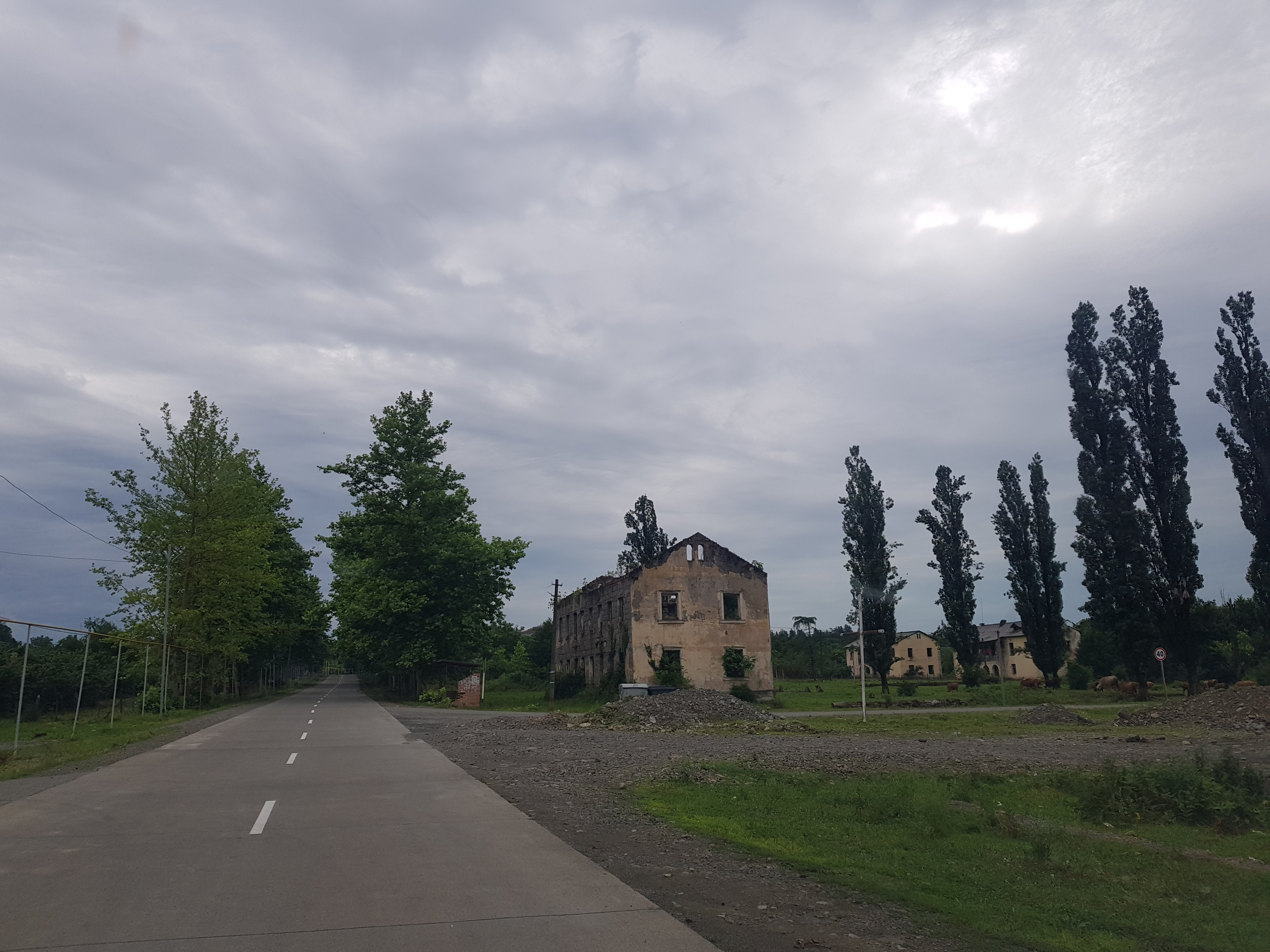
- Baileti

- Location within Georgia Location within Guria
- Coordinates: 41°58′37″N 41°58′12″E
- Country: Georgia
- Mkhare: Guria
- Municipality: Ozurgeti
- Elevation: 60 m (200 ft)

Population (2014)
  - Total: 274
- Time zone: UTC+4 (Georgian Time)

Baileti (Georgian: ბაილეთი) is a village in the Ozurgeti Municipality of Guria in western Georgia.

== Education ==
The only school in Baileti is the Baileti Public School.

== Industry ==
Large parts of Baileti are used for agriculture.
