= Tsitelmta =

Tsitelmta წითელმთა
- Village
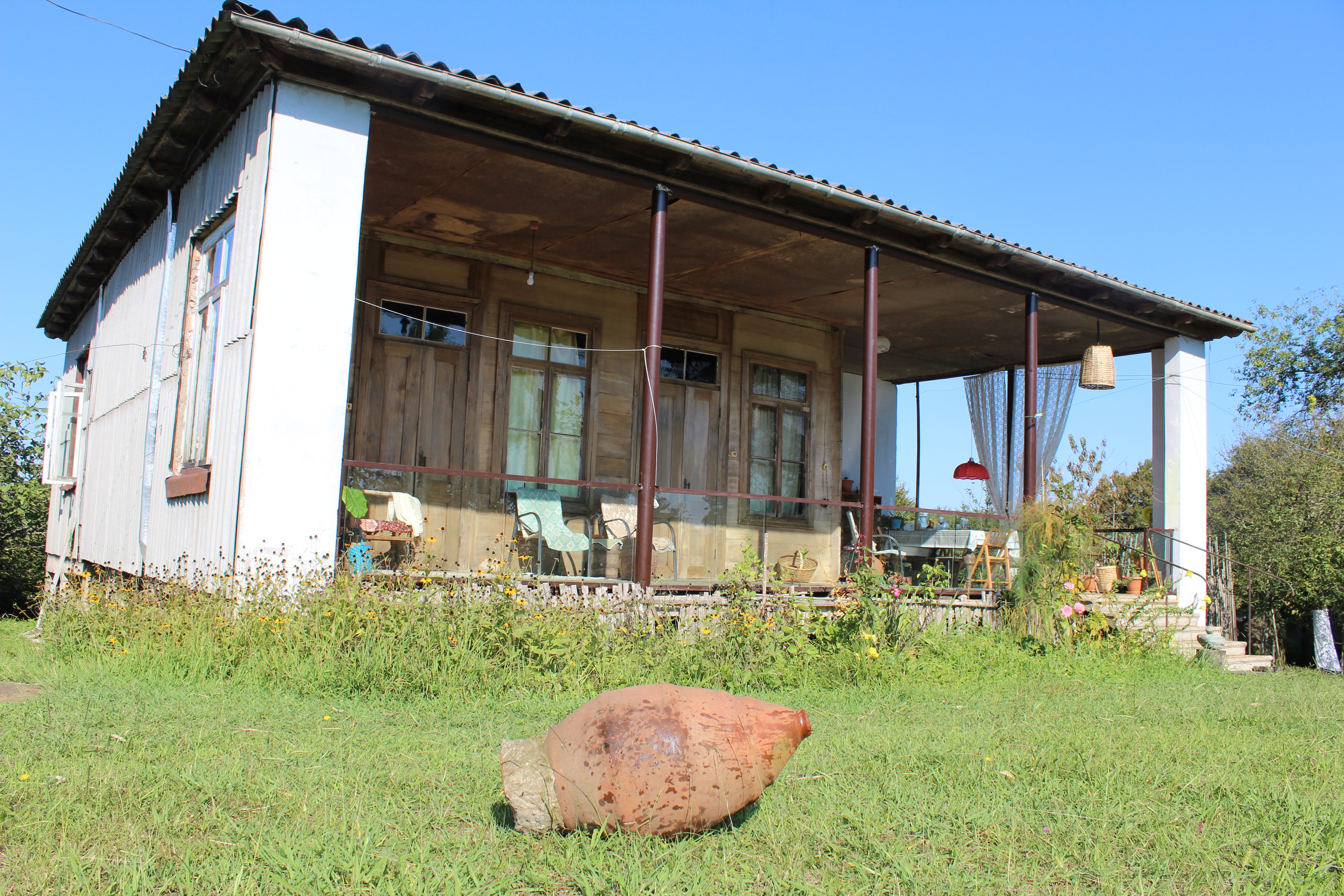

- Location within Georgia Location within Guria
- Coordinates: 41°54′46″N 42°02′42″E
- Country: Georgia
- Mkhare: Guria
- Municipality: Ozurgeti
- Elevation: 170 m (560 ft)

Population (2014)
  - Total: 591
- Time zone: UTC+4 (Georgian Time)

Tsitelmta (Georgian: წითელმთა) is a village in the Ozurgeti Municipality of Guria in western Georgia.
