= Zedubani =

Zedubani ზედუბანი
- Village
- Location within Georgia Location within Guria
- Coordinates: 41°58′55″N 41°52′34″E
- Country: Georgia
- Mkhare: Guria
- Municipality: Ozurgeti
- Elevation: 120 m (390 ft)

Population (2014)
  - Total: 175
- Time zone: UTC+4 (Georgian Time)

Zedubani (Georgian: ზედუბანი) is a village in the Ozurgeti Municipality of Guria in western Georgia.
