= Shua Isnari =

Shua Isnari შუა ისნარი
- Village
- Location within Georgia Location within Guria
- Coordinates: 41°59′29″N 42°05′51″E
- Country: Georgia
- Mkhare: Guria
- Municipality: Ozurgeti
- Elevation: 100 m (330 ft)

Population (2014)
  - Total: 293
- Time zone: UTC+4 (Georgian Time)

Shua Isnari (Georgian: შუა ისნარი) is a village in the Ozurgeti Municipality of Guria in western Georgia.
