= Gogieti =

Gogieti გოგიეთი
- Village
- Location within Georgia Location within Guria
- Coordinates: 41°52′40″N 42°02′51″E
- Country: Georgia
- Mkhare: Guria
- Municipality: Ozurgeti
- Elevation: 280 m (920 ft)

Population (2014)
  - Total: 151
- Time zone: UTC+4 (Georgian Time)

Gogieti (Georgian: გოგიეთი) is a village in the Ozurgeti Municipality of Guria in western Georgia.
