= Jumati =

Jumati ჯუმათი
- Village
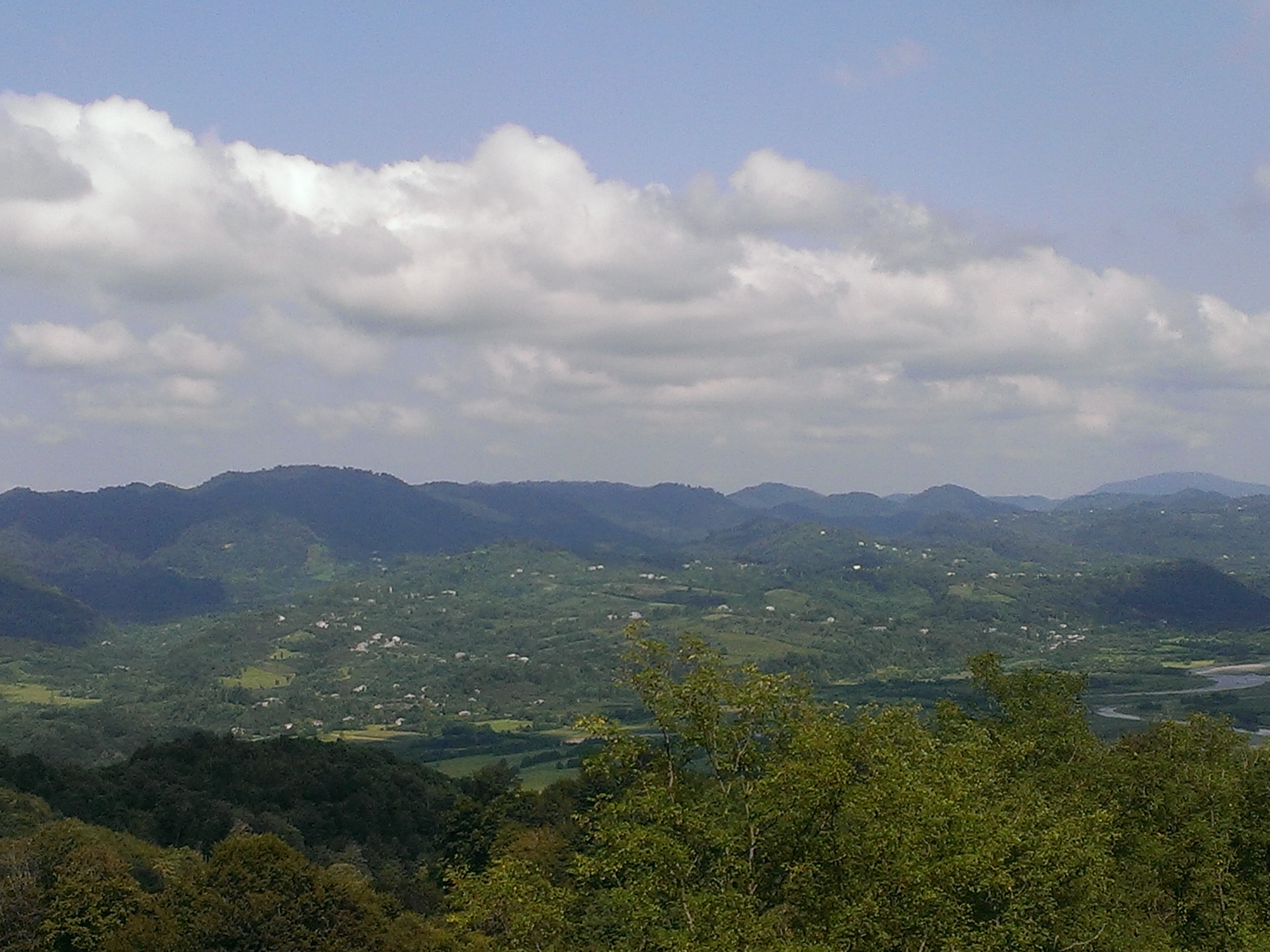

- Location within Georgia Location within Guria
- Coordinates: 42°00′36″N 41°57′50″E
- Country: Georgia
- Mkhare: Guria
- Municipality: Ozurgeti
- Elevation: 120 m (390 ft)

Population (2014)
  - Total: 345
- Time zone: UTC+4 (Georgian Time)

Jumati (Georgian: ჯუმათი) is a village in the Ozurgeti Municipality of Guria in western Georgia.
