= Bogili =

Bogili ბოგილი
- Village
- Location within Georgia Location within Guria
- Coordinates: 42°00′04″N 41°57′23″E
- Country: Georgia
- Mkhare: Guria
- Municipality: Ozurgeti
- Elevation: 50 m (160 ft)

Population (2014)
  - Total: 236
- Time zone: UTC+4 (Georgian Time)

Bogili (Georgian: ბოგილი) is a village in the Ozurgeti Municipality of Guria in western Georgia.
