= Baghdadi, Ozurgeti Municipality =

Baghdadi ბაღდადი
- Village
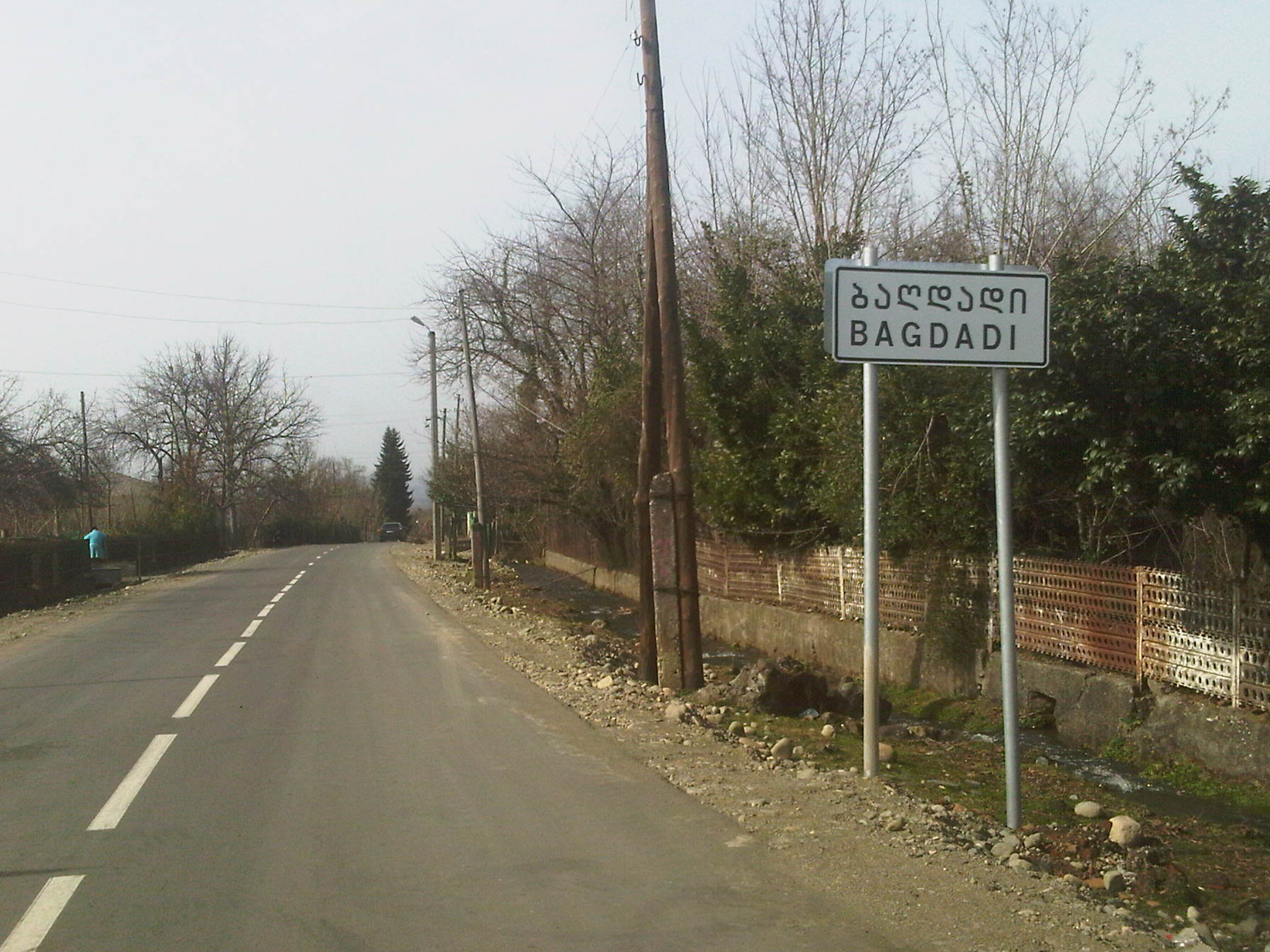

- Location within Georgia Location within Guria
- Coordinates: 41°56′00″N 42°06′00″E
- Country: Georgia
- Mkhare: Guria
- Municipality: Ozurgeti
- Elevation: 180 m (590 ft)

Population (2014)
  - Total: 678
- Time zone: UTC+4 (Georgian Time)

Baghdadi (Georgian: ბაღდადი) is a village in the Ozurgeti Municipality of Guria in western Georgia.
