= Pampaleti =

Pampaleti ფამფალეთი
- Village
- Location within Georgia Location within Guria
- Coordinates: 41°55′50″N 42°07′10″E
- Country: Georgia
- Mkhare: Guria
- Municipality: Ozurgeti
- Elevation: 250 m (820 ft)

Population (2014)
  - Total: 411
- Time zone: UTC+4 (Georgian Time)

Pampaleti (Georgian: ფამფალეთი) is a village in the Ozurgeti Municipality of Guria in western Georgia.
