= Niabauri =

Niabauri ნიაბაური
- Village
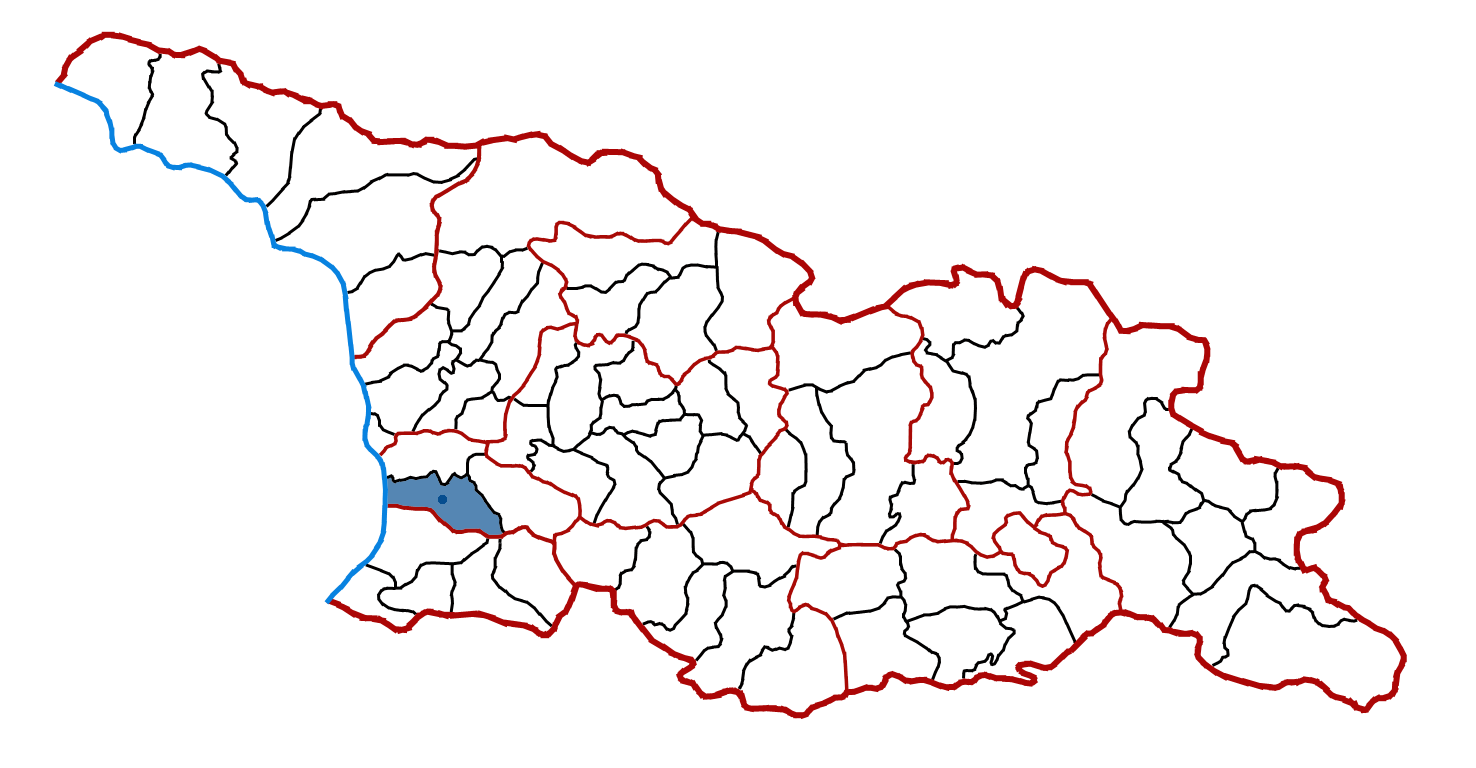

- Location within Georgia Location within Guria
- Coordinates: 41°51′51″N 42°00′22″E
- Country: Georgia
- Mkhare: Guria
- Municipality: Ozurgeti
- Elevation: 240 m (790 ft)

Population (2014)
  - Total: 553
- Time zone: UTC+4 (Georgian Time)

Niabauri (Georgian: ნიაბაური) is a village in the Ozurgeti Municipality of Guria in western Georgia.
