= Kveda Bakhvi =

Kveda Bakhvi ქვედა ბახვი
- Village
- Location within Georgia Location within Guria
- Coordinates: 41°57′34″N 42°05′26″E
- Country: Georgia
- Mkhare: Guria
- Municipality: Ozurgeti
- Elevation: 120 m (390 ft)

Population (2014)
  - Total: 681
- Time zone: UTC+4 (Georgian Time)

Kveda Bakhvi (Georgian: ქვედა ბახვი) is a village in the Ozurgeti Municipality of Guria in western Georgia.
