= Okroskedi (Bakhvi) =

Okroskedi ოქროსქედი
- Village
- Location within Georgia Location within Guria
- Coordinates: 41°57′07″N 42°07′36″E
- Country: Georgia
- Mkhare: Guria
- Municipality: Ozurgeti
- Elevation: 140 m (460 ft)

Population (2014)
  - Total: 136
- Time zone: UTC+4 (Georgian Time)

Okroskedi (Georgian: ოქროსქედი) is a village in the Ozurgeti Municipality of Guria in western Georgia. It is part of the Bakhvi community.
