= Gantiadi, Ozurgeti Municipality =

Gantiadi განთიადი
- Village

- Location within Georgia Location within Guria
- Coordinates: 41°58′47″N 41°55′57″E
- Country: Georgia
- Mkhare: Guria
- Municipality: Ozurgeti
- Elevation: 80 m (260 ft)

Population (2014)
  - Total: 373
- Time zone: UTC+4 (Georgian Time)

Gantiadi (Georgian: განთიადი) is a village in the Ozurgeti Municipality of Guria in western Georgia.
