= Zhanaura =

Zhanaura ჟანაურა
- Village
- Location within Georgia Location within Guria
- Coordinates: 41°59′30″N 42°07′08″E
- Country: Georgia
- Mkhare: Guria
- Municipality: Ozurgeti
- Elevation: 150 m (490 ft)

Population (2014)
  - Total: 156
- Time zone: UTC+4 (Georgian Time)

Zhanaura (Georgian: ჟანაურა) is a village in the Ozurgeti Municipality of Guria in western Georgia.
