= Kveda Dzimiti =

Kveda Dzimiti ქვედა ძიმითი
- Village
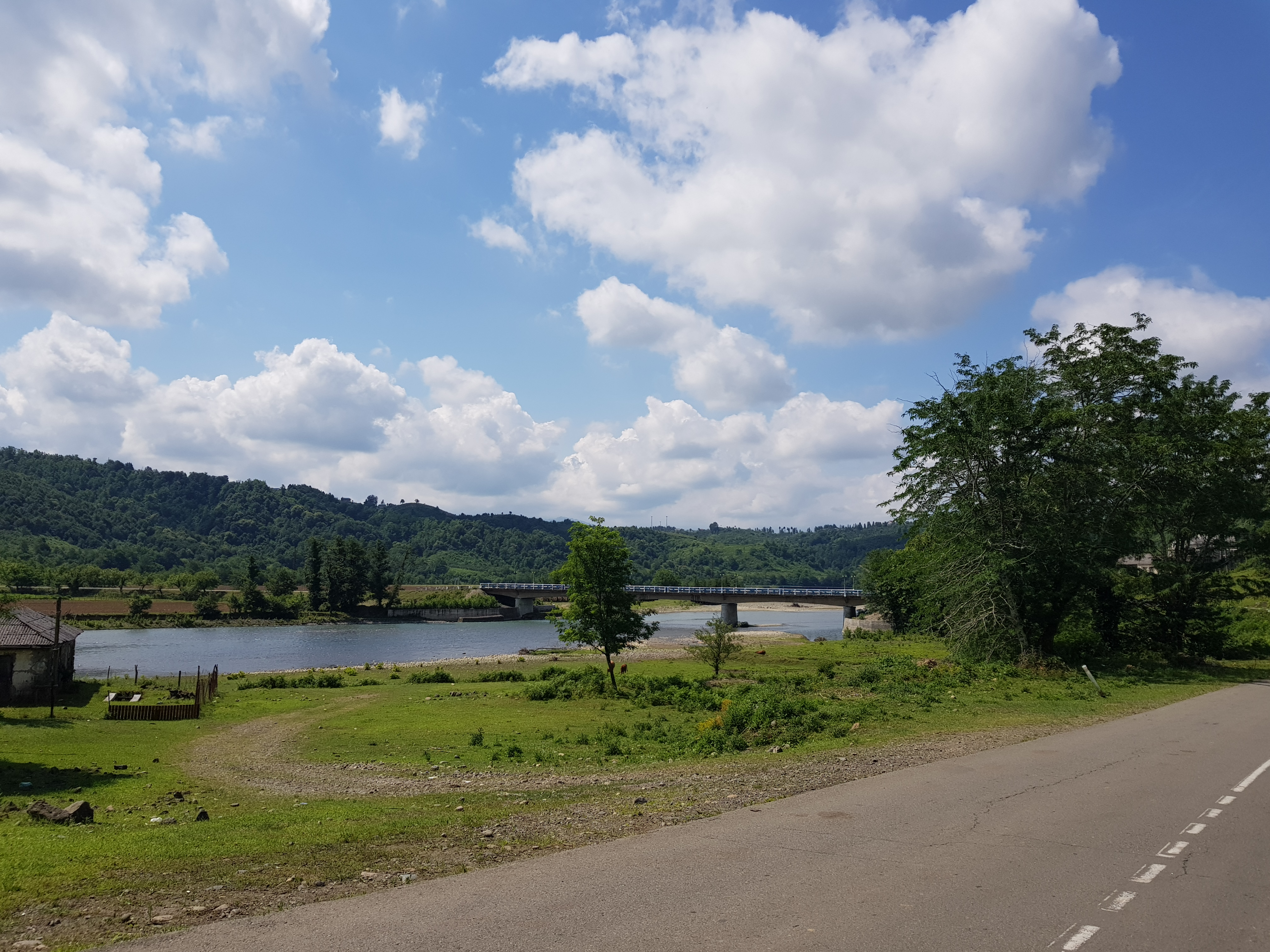

- Location within Georgia Location within Guria
- Coordinates: 41°59′38″N 42°03′32″E
- Country: Georgia
- Mkhare: Guria
- Municipality: Ozurgeti
- Elevation: 130 m (430 ft)

Population (2014)
  - Total: 885
- Time zone: UTC+4 (Georgian Time)

Kveda Dzimiti (Georgian: ქვედა ძიმითი) is a village in the Ozurgeti Municipality of Guria in western Georgia.
