= Khvarbeti =

Khvarbeti ხვარბეთი
- Village
- Location within Georgia
- Coordinates: 41°57′13″N 41°54′42″E
- Country: Georgia
- Mkhare: Guria
- Municipality: Ozurgeti
- Elevation: 80 m (260 ft)

Population (2014)
  - Total: 673
- Time zone: UTC+4 (Georgian Time)

Khvarbeti (Georgian: ხვარბეთი) is a village in the Ozurgeti Municipality of Guria in western Georgia.
