= Mshvidobauri =

Mshvidobauri მშვიდობაური
- Village

- Location within Georgia Location within Guria
- Coordinates: 41°58′02″N 42°06′51″E
- Country: Georgia
- Mkhare: Guria
- Municipality: Ozurgeti
- Elevation: 240 m (790 ft)

Population (2014)
  - Total: 251
- Time zone: UTC+4 (Georgian Time)

Mshvidobauri (Georgian: მშვიდობაური) is a village in the Ozurgeti Municipality of Guria in western Georgia.
