= Bokhvauri =

Bokhvauri ბოხვაური
- Village
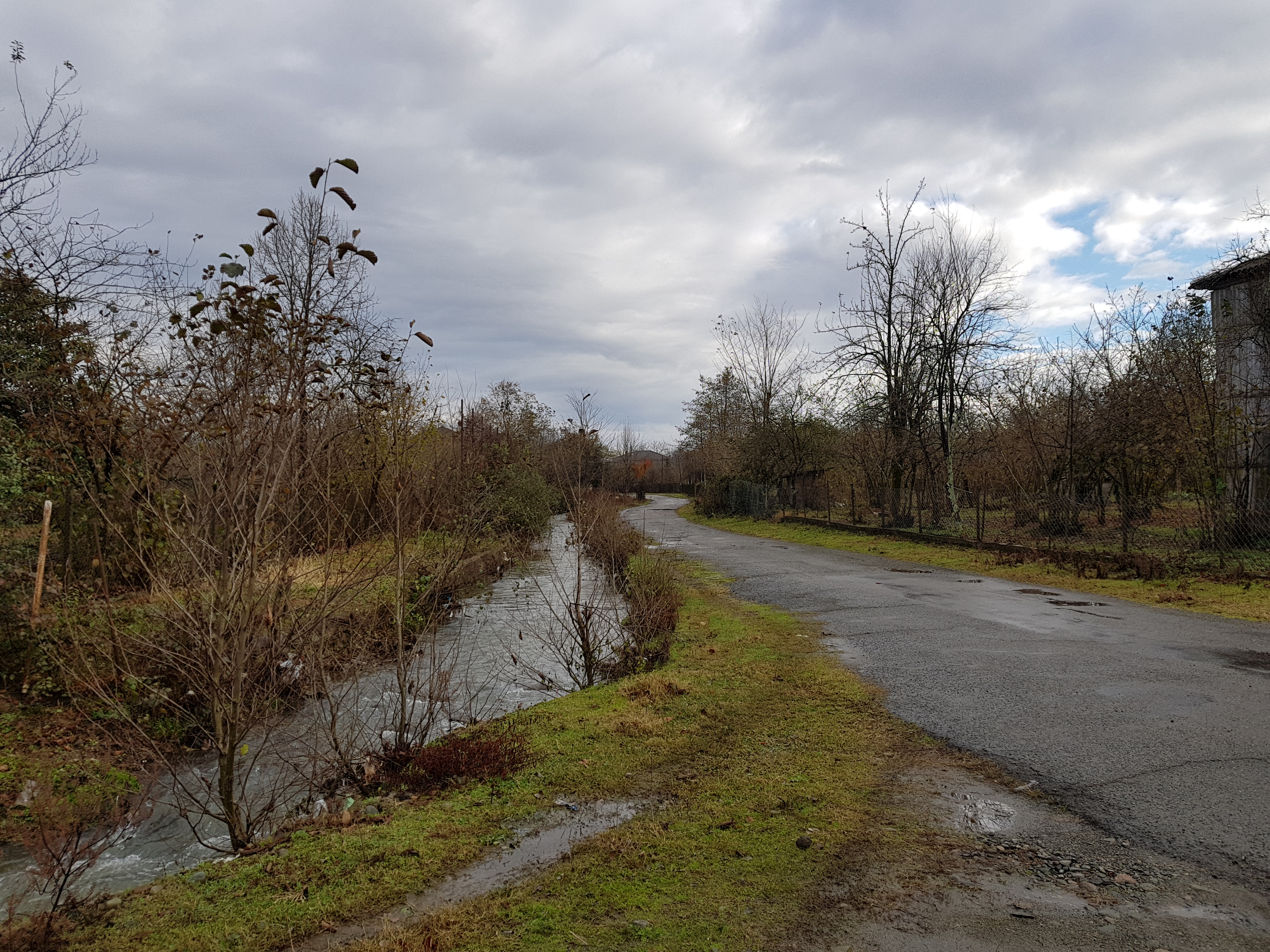

- Location within Georgia Location within Guria
- Coordinates: 41°55′27″N 42°02′09″E
- Country: Georgia
- Mkhare: Guria
- Municipality: Ozurgeti
- Elevation: 100 m (330 ft)

Population (2014)
  - Total: 1,056
- Time zone: UTC+4 (Georgian Time)

Bokhvauri (Georgian: ბოხვაური) is a village in the Ozurgeti Municipality of Guria in western Georgia.
