= Gomi, Ozurgeti Municipality =

Gomi გომი
- Village
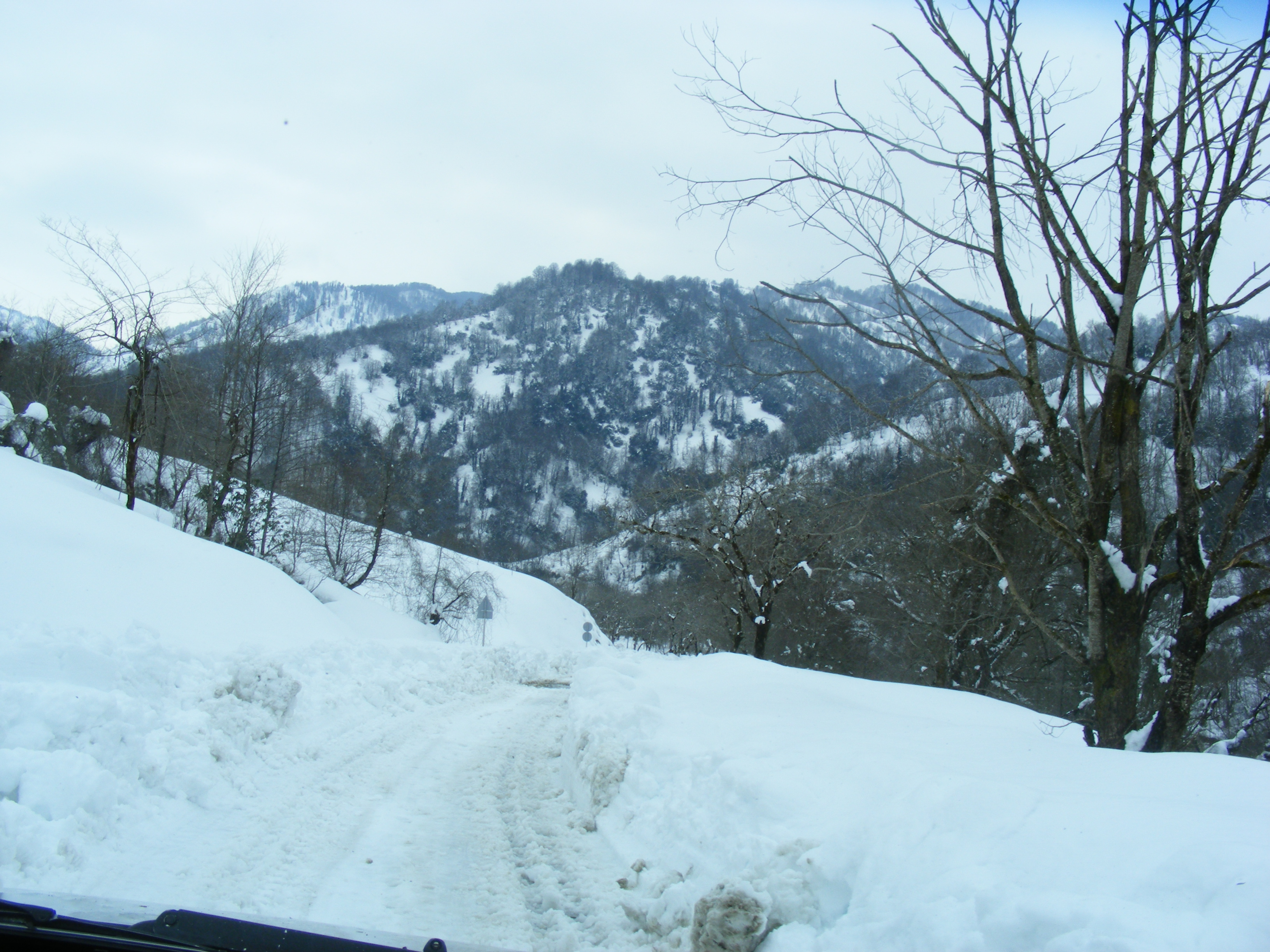

- Location within Georgia Location within Guria
- Coordinates: 41°53′35″N 42°06′05″E
- Country: Georgia
- Mkhare: Guria
- Municipality: Ozurgeti
- Elevation: 250 m (820 ft)

Population (2014)
  - Total: 344
- Time zone: UTC+4 (Georgian Time)

Gomi (Georgian: გომი) is a village in the Ozurgeti Municipality of Guria in western Georgia.
