= Gonebiskari =

Gonebiskari გონებისკარი
- Village
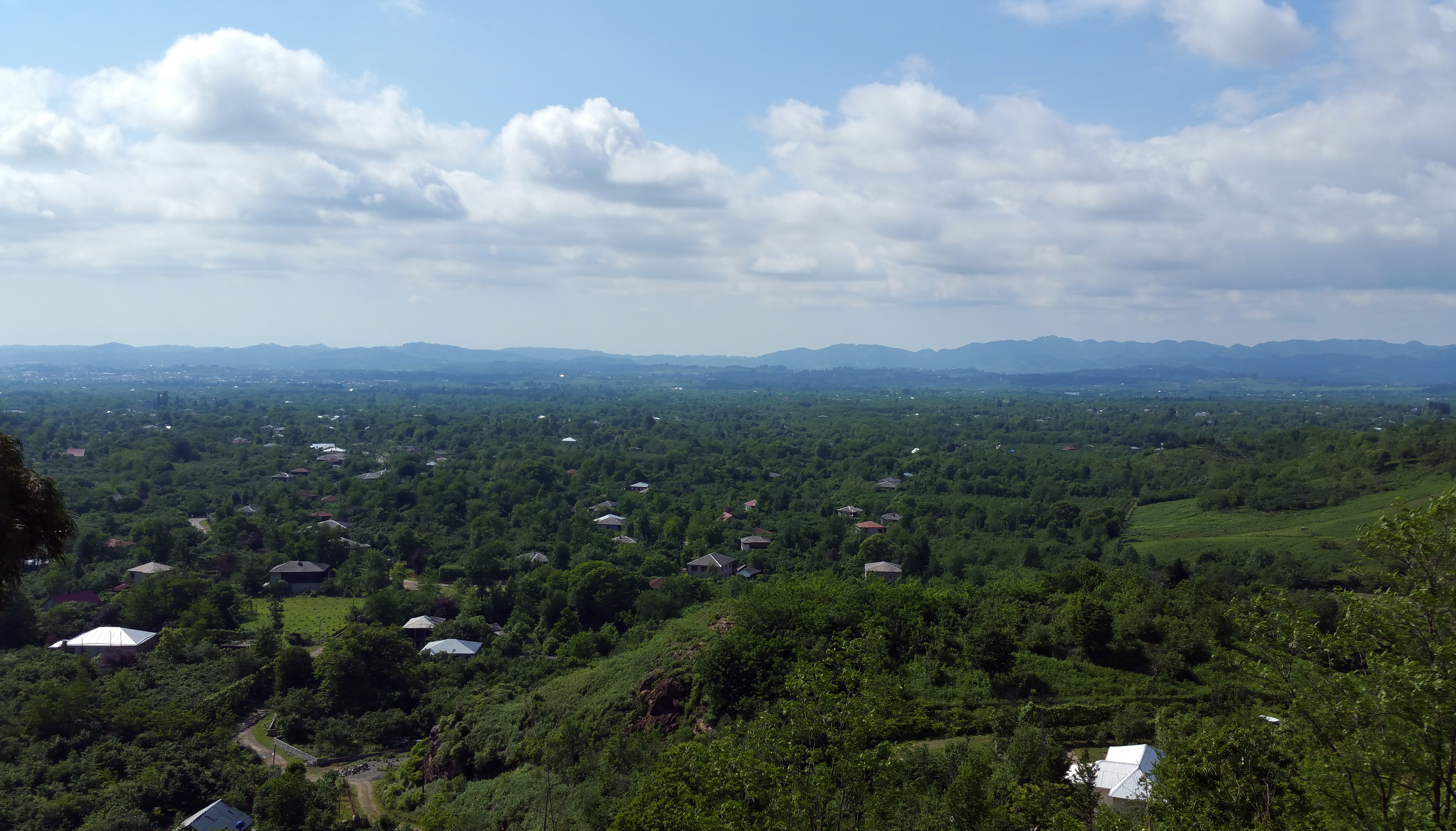

- Location within Georgia Location within Guria
- Coordinates: 41°54′20″N 42°05′00″E
- Country: Georgia
- Mkhare: Guria
- Municipality: Ozurgeti
- Elevation: 190 m (620 ft)

Population (2014)
  - Total: 88
- Time zone: UTC+4 (Georgian Time)

Gonebiskari (Georgian: გონებისკარი) is a village in the Ozurgeti Municipality of Guria in western Georgia.
