= Vakijvari =

Vakijvari ვაკიჯვარი
- Village
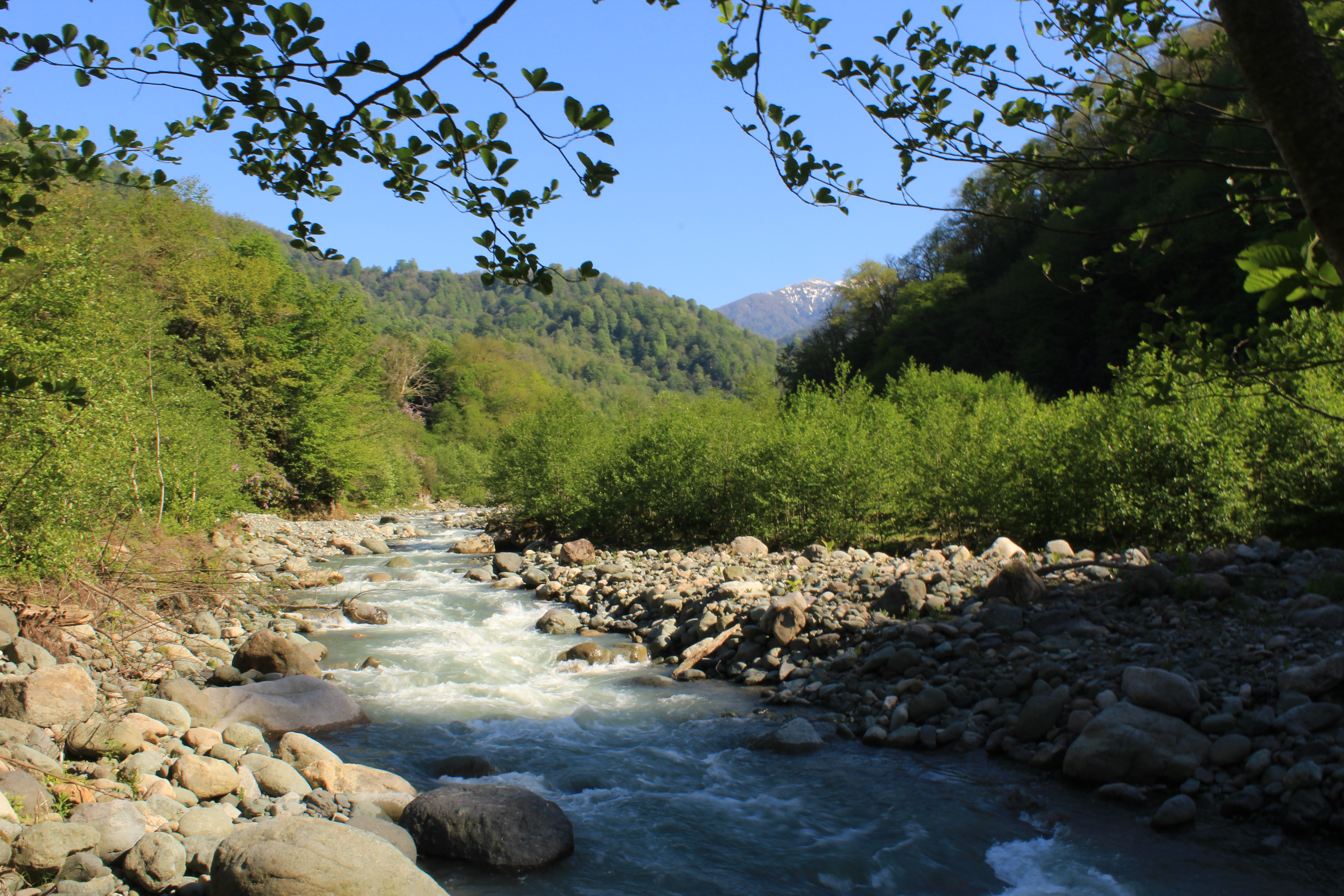

- Location within Georgia Location within Guria
- Coordinates: 41°55′02″N 42°08′43″E
- Country: Georgia
- Mkhare: Guria
- Municipality: Ozurgeti
- Elevation: 400 m (1,300 ft)

Population (2014)
  - Total: 597
- Time zone: UTC+4 (Georgian Time)

Vakijvari (Georgian: ვაკიჯვარი) is a village in the Ozurgeti Municipality of Guria in western Georgia. Vakijvari is officially recognized as resort place by Government of Georgia.
