= Dabali Etseri =

Dabali Etseri დაბალი ეწერი
- Village
- Location within Georgia Location within Guria
- Coordinates: 41°57′40″N 42°08′40″E
- Country: Georgia
- Mkhare: Guria
- Municipality: Ozurgeti
- Elevation: 170 m (560 ft)

Population (2014)
  - Total: 324
- Time zone: UTC+4 (Georgian Time)

Dabali Etseri (Georgian: დაბალი ეწერი) is a village in the Ozurgeti Municipality of Guria in western Georgia.
