= Naghobilevi =

Naghbovilevi ნაღობილევი
- Village
- Location within Georgia Location within Guria
- Coordinates: 41°56′32″N 41°52′00″E
- Country: Georgia
- Mkhare: Guria
- Municipality: Ozurgeti
- Elevation: 75 m (246 ft)

Population (2014)
  - Total: 730
- Time zone: UTC+4 (Georgian Time)

Naghobilevi (Georgian: ნაღობილევი) is a village in the Ozurgeti Municipality of Guria in western Georgia. Located north of Meria Airport.
