= Khrialeti =

Khrialeti ხრიალეთი
- Village
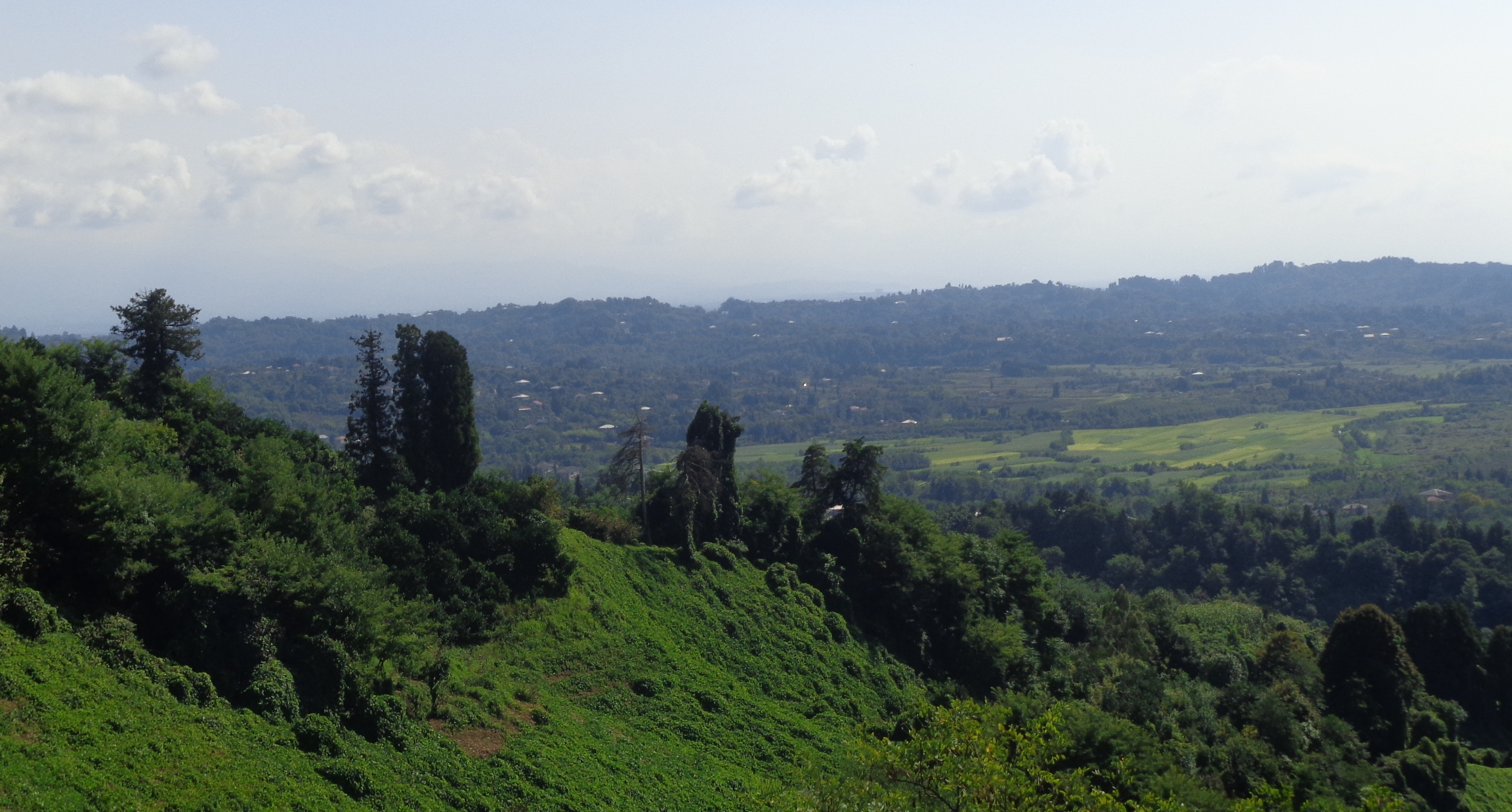

- Location within Georgia Location within Guria
- Coordinates: 42°00′22″N 41°49′49″E
- Country: Georgia
- Mkhare: Guria
- Municipality: Ozurgeti
- Elevation: 80 m (260 ft)

Population (2014)
  - Total: 1,533
- Time zone: UTC+4 (Georgian Time)

Khrialeti (Georgian: ხრიალეთი) is a village in the Ozurgeti Municipality of Guria in western Georgia.
