= Chakhvata =

Chakhvata ჭახვათა
- Village
- Location within Georgia Location within Guria
- Coordinates: 41°56′10″N 41°50′26″E
- Country: Georgia
- Mkhare: Guria
- Municipality: Ozurgeti
- Elevation: 70 m (230 ft)

Population (2014)
  - Total: 85
- Time zone: UTC+4 (Georgian Time)

Chakhvata (Georgian: ჭახვათა) is a village in the Ozurgeti Municipality of Guria in western Georgia.
