= Vaniskedi =

Vaniskedi ვანისქედი
- Village
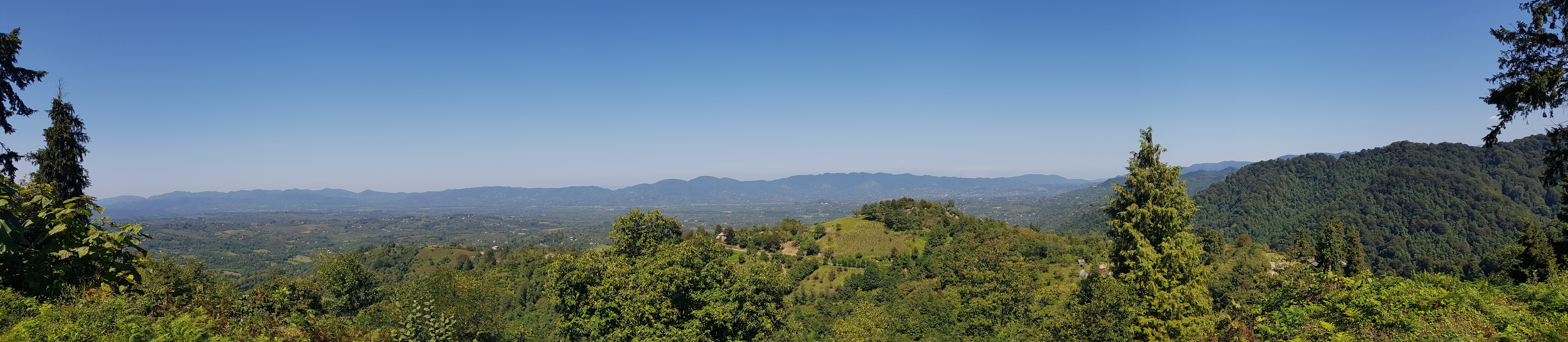

- Location within Georgia Location within Guria
- Coordinates: 41°56′30″N 42°10′45″E
- Country: Georgia
- Mkhare: Guria
- Municipality: Ozurgeti
- Elevation: 280 m (920 ft)

Population (2014)
  - Total: 215
- Time zone: UTC+4 (Georgian Time)

Vaniskedi (Georgian: ვანისქედი) is a village in the Ozurgeti Municipality of Guria in western Georgia.
