= Kvemo Makvaneti =

Kvemo Makvaneti ქვემო მაკვანეთი
- Village
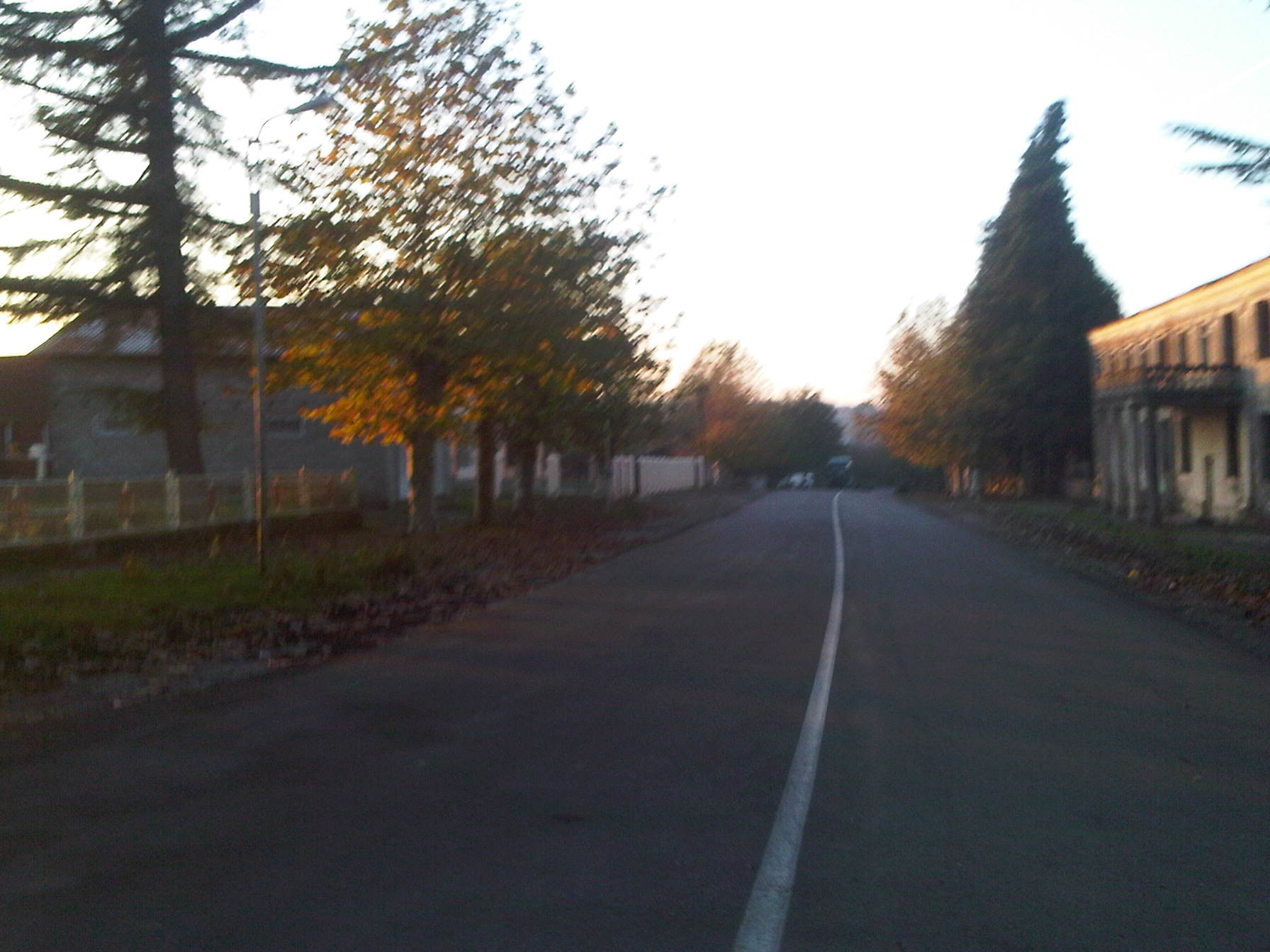

- Location within Georgia Location within Guria
- Coordinates: 41°54′15″N 42°01′06″E
- Country: Georgia
- Mkhare: Guria
- Municipality: Ozurgeti
- Elevation: 130 m (430 ft)

Population (2014)
  - Total: 797
- Time zone: UTC+4 (Georgian Time)

Kvemo Makvaneti (Georgian: ქვემო მაკვანეთი) is a village in the Ozurgeti Municipality of Guria in western Georgia.
