= Zemo Natanebi =

Zemo Natanebi ზემო ნატანები
- Village

- Location within Georgia Location within Guria
- Coordinates: 41°57′57″N 41°50′27″E
- Country: Georgia
- Mkhare: Guria
- Municipality: Ozurgeti
- Elevation: 20 m (66 ft)

Population (2014)
  - Total: 1,174
- Time zone: UTC+4 (Georgian Time)

Zemo Natanebi (Georgian: ზემო ნატანები) is a village in the Ozurgeti Municipality of Guria in western Georgia.
