= Mziani =

Mziani მზიანი
- Village
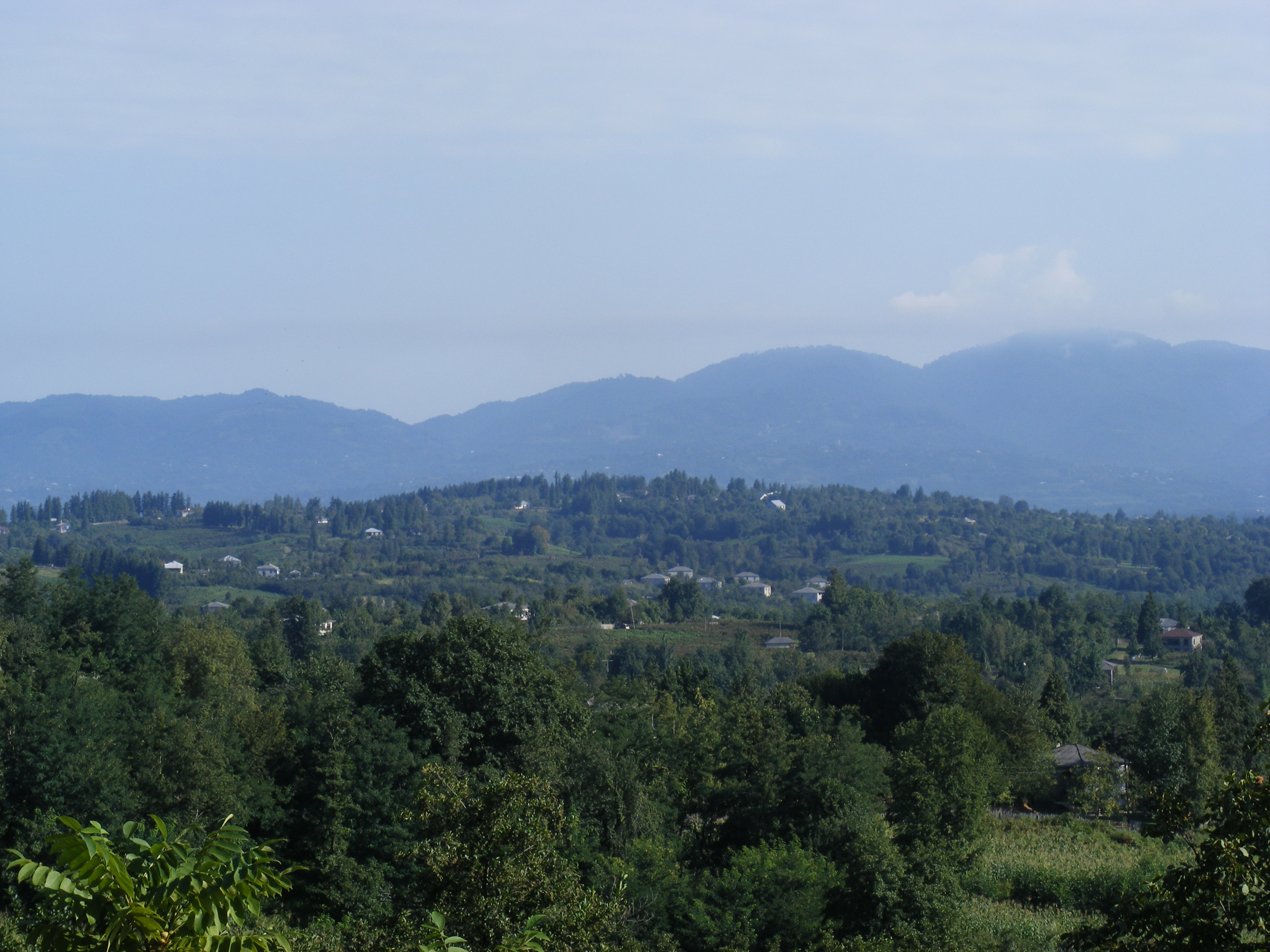

- Location within Georgia Location within Guria
- Coordinates: 41°58′45″N 42°09′30″E
- Country: Georgia
- Mkhare: Guria
- Municipality: Ozurgeti
- Elevation: 160 m (520 ft)

Population (2014)
  - Total: 263
- Time zone: UTC+4 (Georgian Time)

Mziani (Georgian: მზიანი) is a village in the Ozurgeti Municipality of Guria in western Georgia. The village lies within an area of known ancient metalworking furnaces, and was the focus of a 2010 magnetic survey by Oxford University. One of the furnaces identified by the magnetic survey was subsequently excavated.
