= Kvachalati =

Kvachalati კვაჭალათი
- Village
- Location within Georgia Location within Guria
- Coordinates: 41°52′55″N 42°01′07″E
- Country: Georgia
- Mkhare: Guria
- Municipality: Ozurgeti
- Elevation: 140 m (460 ft)

Population (2014)
  - Total: 694
- Time zone: UTC+4 (Georgian Time)

Kvachalati (Georgian: კვაჭალათი) is a village in the Ozurgeti Municipality of Guria in western Georgia.
