= Askana =

Askana ასკანა
- Village
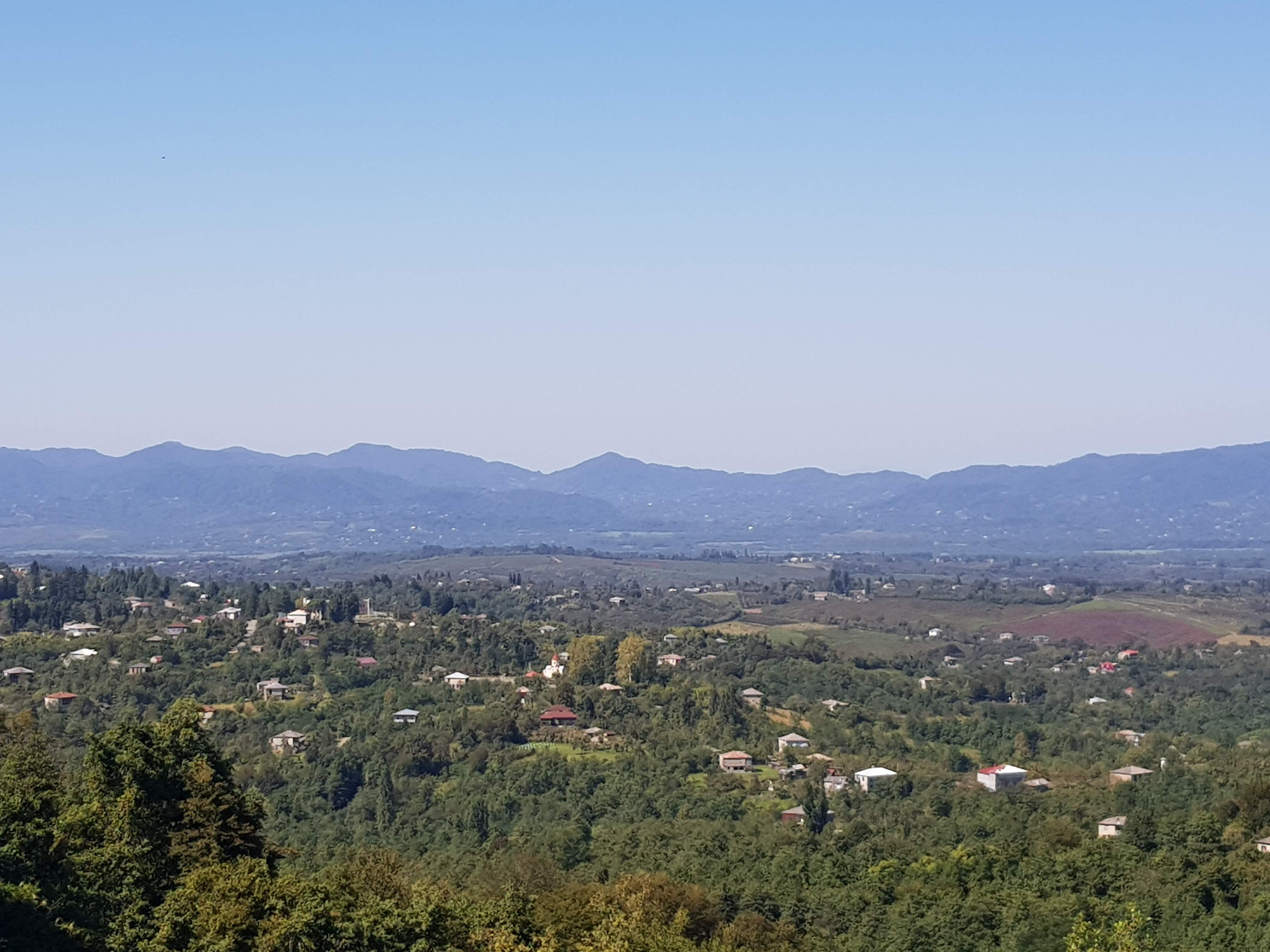

- Location within Georgia Location within Guria
- Coordinates: 41°57′05″N 42°09′12″E
- Country: Georgia
- Mkhare: Guria
- Municipality: Ozurgeti
- Elevation: 173 m (568 ft)

Population (2014)
  - Total: 424
- Time zone: UTC+4 (Georgian Time)

Askana (Georgian: ასკანა) is a village in the Ozurgeti Municipality of Guria in western Georgia with a population of 424 as of 2014.
