= Gaghma Dvabzu =

Gaghma Dvabzu გაღმა დვაბზუ
- Village

- Location within Georgia Location within Guria
- Coordinates: 41°56′57″N 42°04′01″E
- Country: Georgia
- Mkhare: Guria
- Municipality: Ozurgeti
- Elevation: 125 m (410 ft)

Population (2014)
  - Total: 772
- Time zone: UTC+4 (Georgian Time)

Gaghma Dvabzu (Georgian: გაღმა დვაბზუ) is a village in the Ozurgeti Municipality of Guria in western Georgia.
