= Vake, Ozurgeti Municipality =

Vake ვაკე
- Village
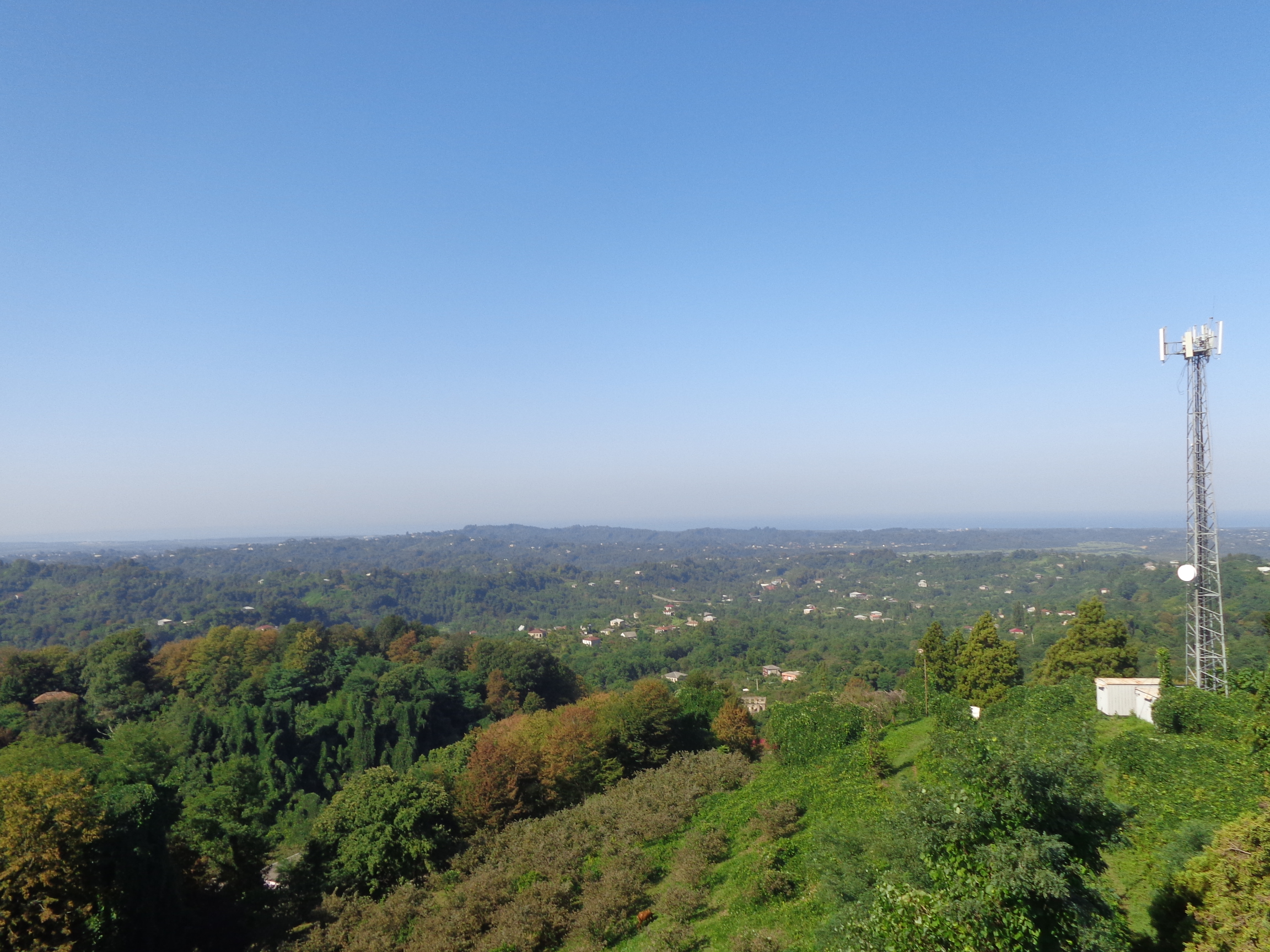

- Location within Georgia Location within Guria
- Coordinates: 41°59′12″N 41°51′32″E
- Country: Georgia
- Mkhare: Guria
- Municipality: Ozurgeti
- Elevation: 100 m (330 ft)

Population (2014)
  - Total: 504
- Time zone: UTC+4 (Georgian Time)

Vake (Georgian: ვაკე) is a village in the Ozurgeti Municipality of Guria in western Georgia.
