= National University of San Agustín =

Public university in Arequipa, Peru

Coordinates: 16.4137°S 71.5342°W

- Universidad Nacional de San Agustín
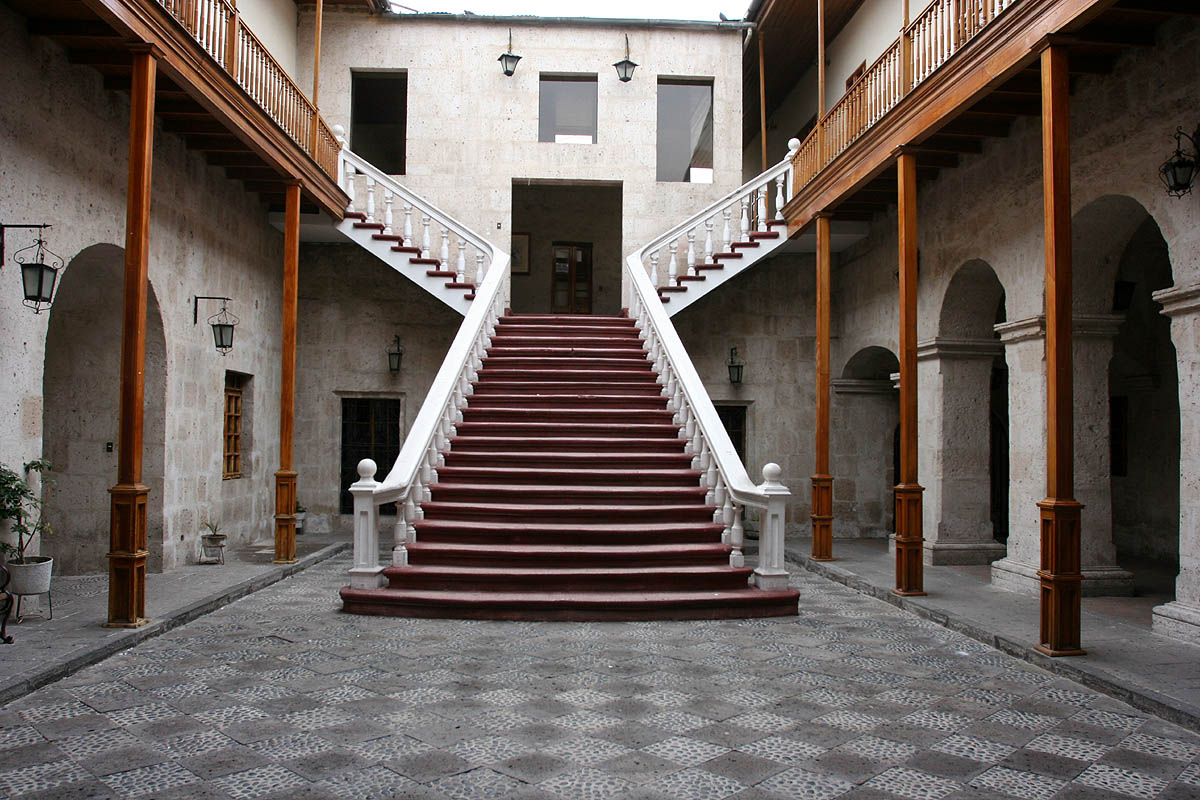
- Motto: "Domus Sapientiae"
- Type: Public university
- Established: 1828; 198 years ago
- Rector: Rohel Sanchez Sanchez
- Students: 27,300
- Location: Calle Santa Catalina 117 Arequipa, Peru, Arequipa, Arequipa, Peru
- Website: www.unsa.edu.pe

The National University of San Agustín (UNSA; Spanish: Universidad Nacional de San Agustín) is a public university in Arequipa, Peru. The university has been consistently ranked as one of the top public universities in Peru. It is one of the oldest public universities in Latin America with continuous operation since its founding on November 11, 1828.

The university comprises three campuses, 17 colleges, and 45 professional schools from the fields of humanities, natural sciences, biological, social sciences and engineering.

== Colleges and professional schools ==
College and faculties	School
College of Biological Sciences	Agronomy
College of Biological Sciences	Biology
College of Biological Sciences	Nutritional Sciences
College of Biological Sciences	Farming Engineering
College of Nursing	Nursing
College of Medicine	Medicine
College of Architecture and Urbanism	Architecture
College of Natural and Formal Sciences	Physics
College of Natural and Formal Sciences	Mathematics
College of Natural and Formal Sciences	Chemistry
College of Geology, Geophysics and Mining	Geophysical Engineering
College of Geology, Geophysics and Mining	Geological Engineering
College of Geology, Geophysics and Mining	Mining Engineering
College of Civil Engineering	Civil Engineering
College of Civil Engineering	Sanitary Engineering
College of Process Engineering	Metallurgical Engineering
College of Process Engineering	Chemical Engineering
College of Process Engineering	Food Industry Engineering
College of Process Engineering	Materials Engineering
College of Process Engineering	Environmental Engineering
College of Production and Services	Electronic Engineering
College of Production and Services	Industrial Engineering
College of Production and Services	Mechanical Engineering
College of Production and Services	Electric Engineering
College of Production and Services	Systems Engineering
College of Production and Services	Computer Science
College of Production and Services	Telecommunications Engineering
College of Business	Business
College of Business	Marketing
College of Business	Banking and Insurance
College of Business	Management
College of Accountancy and Finance	Accountancy
College of Accountancy and Finance	Finance
College of Education	Education
College of Historic Social Sciences	History
College of Historic Social Sciences	Sociology
College of Historic Social Sciences	Social Work
College of Historic Social Sciences	Anthropology
College of Historic Social Sciences	Tourism
College of Law	Law
College of Economy	Economy
College of Philosophy and Humanities	Arts and Music
College of Philosophy and Humanities	Philosophy
College of Philosophy and Humanities	Literature
College of Psychology and Communications	Psychology
College of Psychology and Communications	Public Relations
College of Psychology and Communications	Communication

Arequipa's principal stadium — one of the largest in Peru, Estadio de la UNSA — was built by the university.

== Notable alumni ==
- Zeda Dzimiti - politician

== See also ==
- Official website
- List of universities in Peru
