= Gomismta =

Historic spa place in Georgia

Gomismta გომისმთა
- Borough
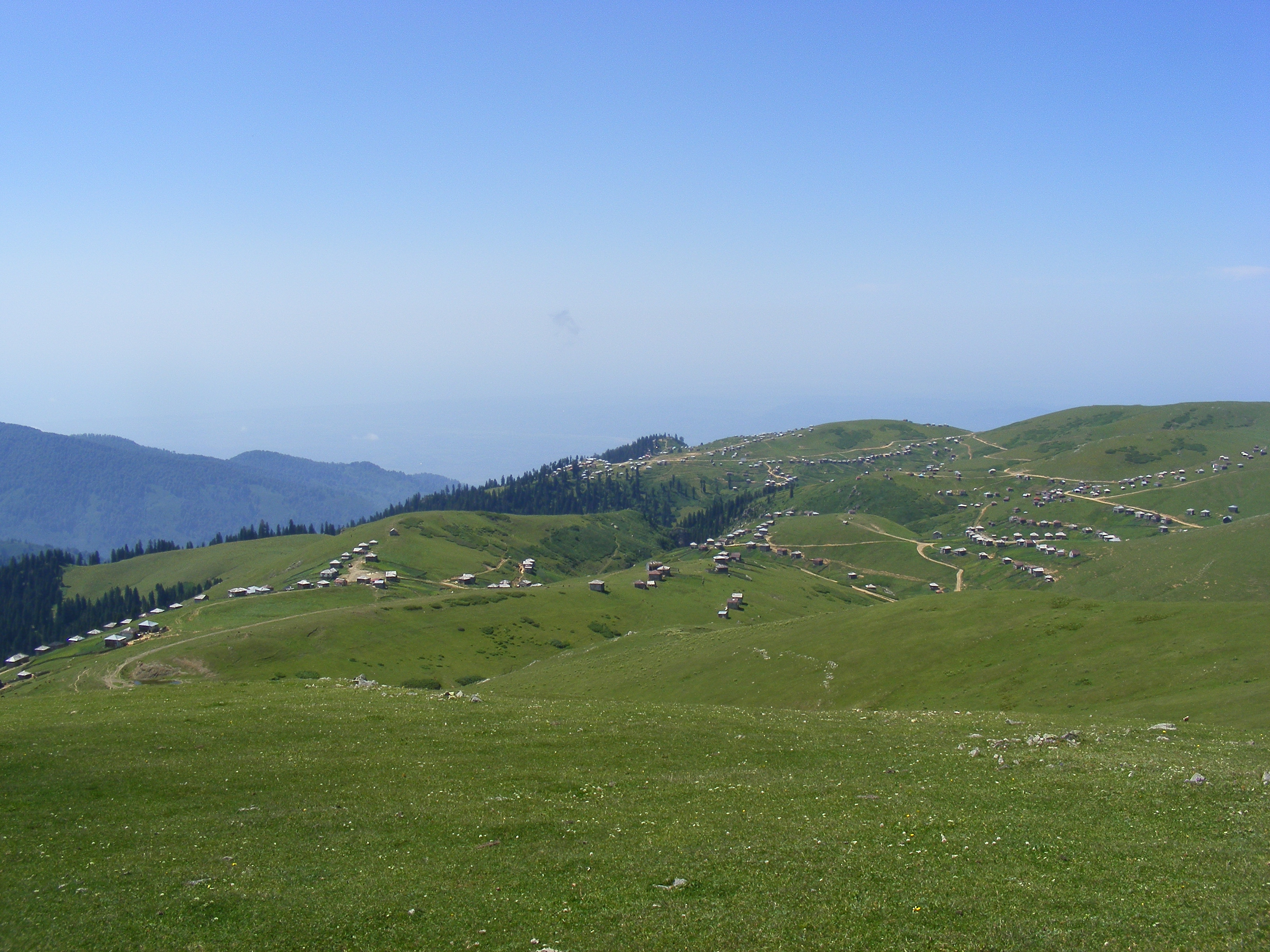
- Interactive map of Gomismta
- Location within Georgia Location within Guria
- Coordinates: 41°49′25″N 42°09′32″E
- Country: Georgia
- Mkhare: Guria
- Municipality: Ozurgeti
- Elevation: 2,000 m (6,600 ft)

Population (2014)
  - Total: 0
- Time zone: UTC+4 (Georgian Time)

Gomismta (Georgian: გომისმთა) is a Daba and mountain resort in the Ozurgeti Municipality of Guria in western Georgia. Gomismta is located on the northern slope of Meskheti Range, in the gorge of Bzhuzhi river. It is on the way to Gomismta-Shuakhevi path through Meskheti Mountains.

== History ==
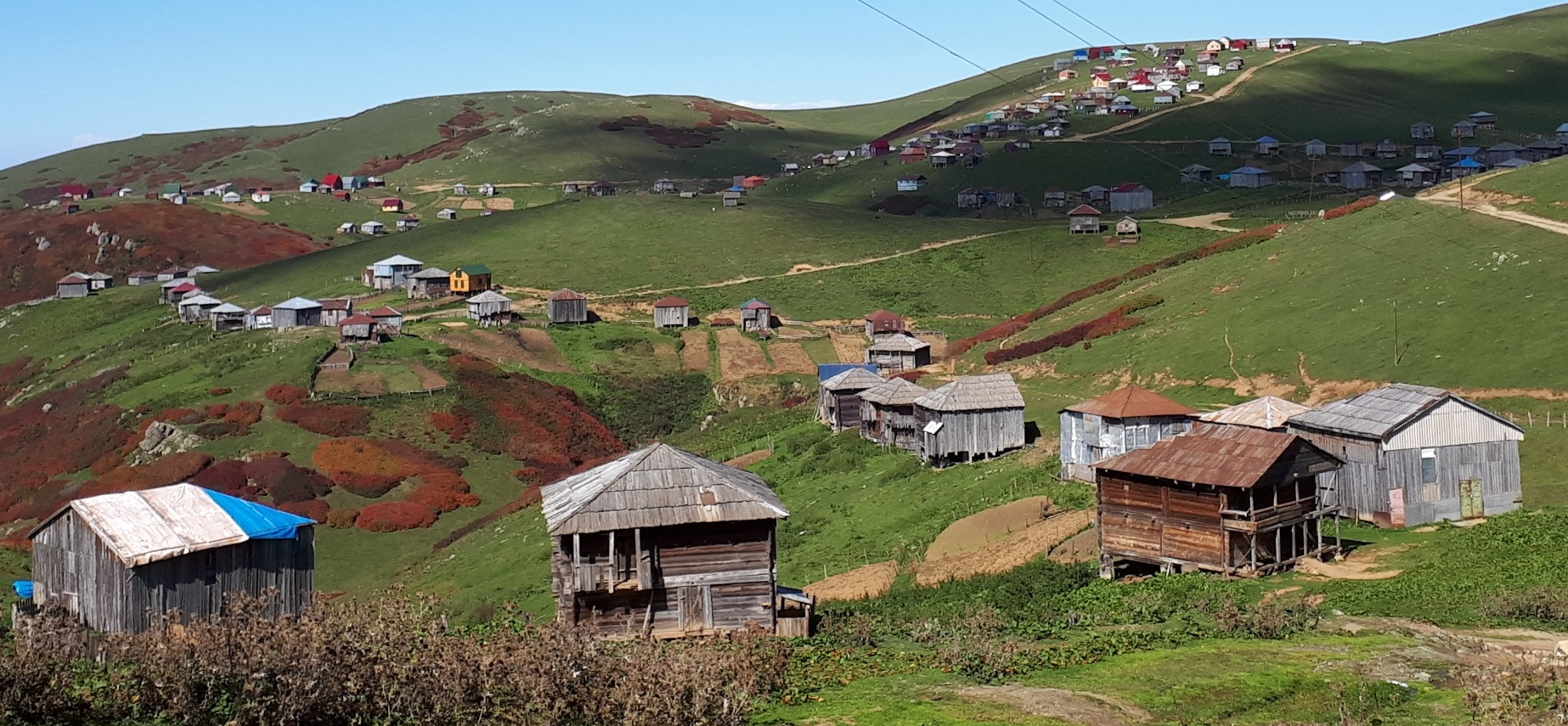
Gomismta resort area, Guria region, Georgia

After the Russo-Turkish War of 1828-1829 resulted in annexation of Guria into the Russian Empire, the border between Turkey and Russia was established along the watershed of the Mescheti Mountains until 1878. The present-day border of Guria and Adjara. According to a local newspaper in 1902, there were about 20 small houses and a small shop. A legend about Gomismta illustrates the long-known health benefits of the environment of Gomismta. The legend tells of a shepherd who climbed the mountain for the first time with a daughter who suffered from incurable hay fever, after which she quickly healed. The healthy climatic characteristics of the area were described in the early 20th century. After the World War II, development picked up, and the road to Gomismta was built in the 1950s. By that time there were already about 500 cottages and 4500-5000 people a year visited the spa. By 1970, this number had doubled. After the resort fell into disrepair after the fall of the Soviet Union, the increasing tourism to Georgia since 2010 and the profiling of the mountain areas for ecotourism have increased the interest in developing the place again.

== See also ==
- Shemokmedi

Other Georgian highland resorts:

- Bakhmaro
- Abastumani
- Sairme
