= Kviriketi =

Kviriketi კვირიკეთი
- Village
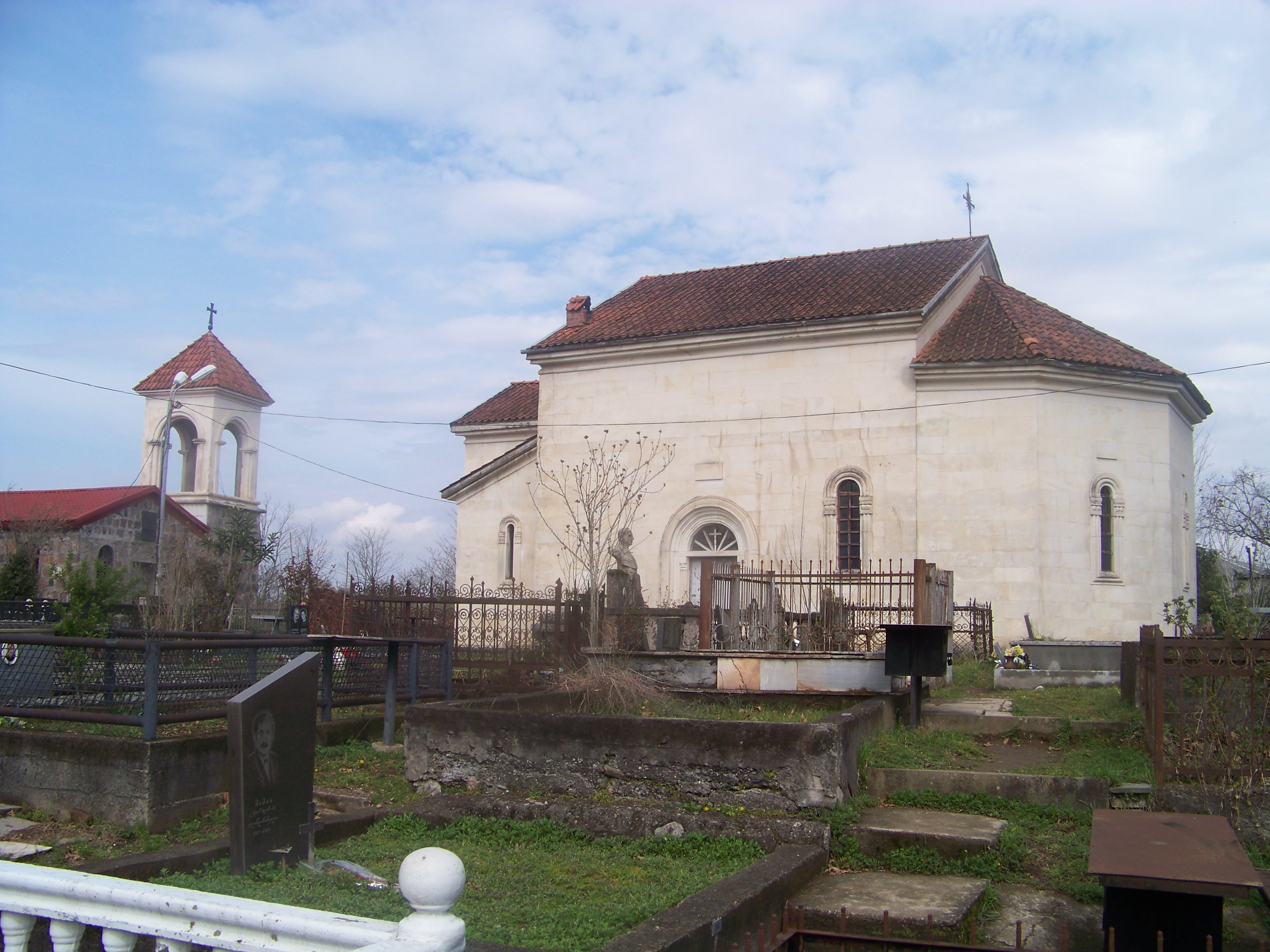

- Location within Georgia Location within Guria
- Coordinates: 41°54′50″N 42°01′40″E
- Country: Georgia
- Mkhare: Guria
- Municipality: Ozurgeti
- Elevation: 75 m (246 ft)

Population (2014)
  - Total: 284
- Time zone: UTC+4 (Georgian Time)

Kviriketi (Georgian: კვირიკეთი) is a village in the Ozurgeti Municipality of Guria in western Georgia.
