= Chanieturi =

Chanieturi ჭანიეთური
- Village
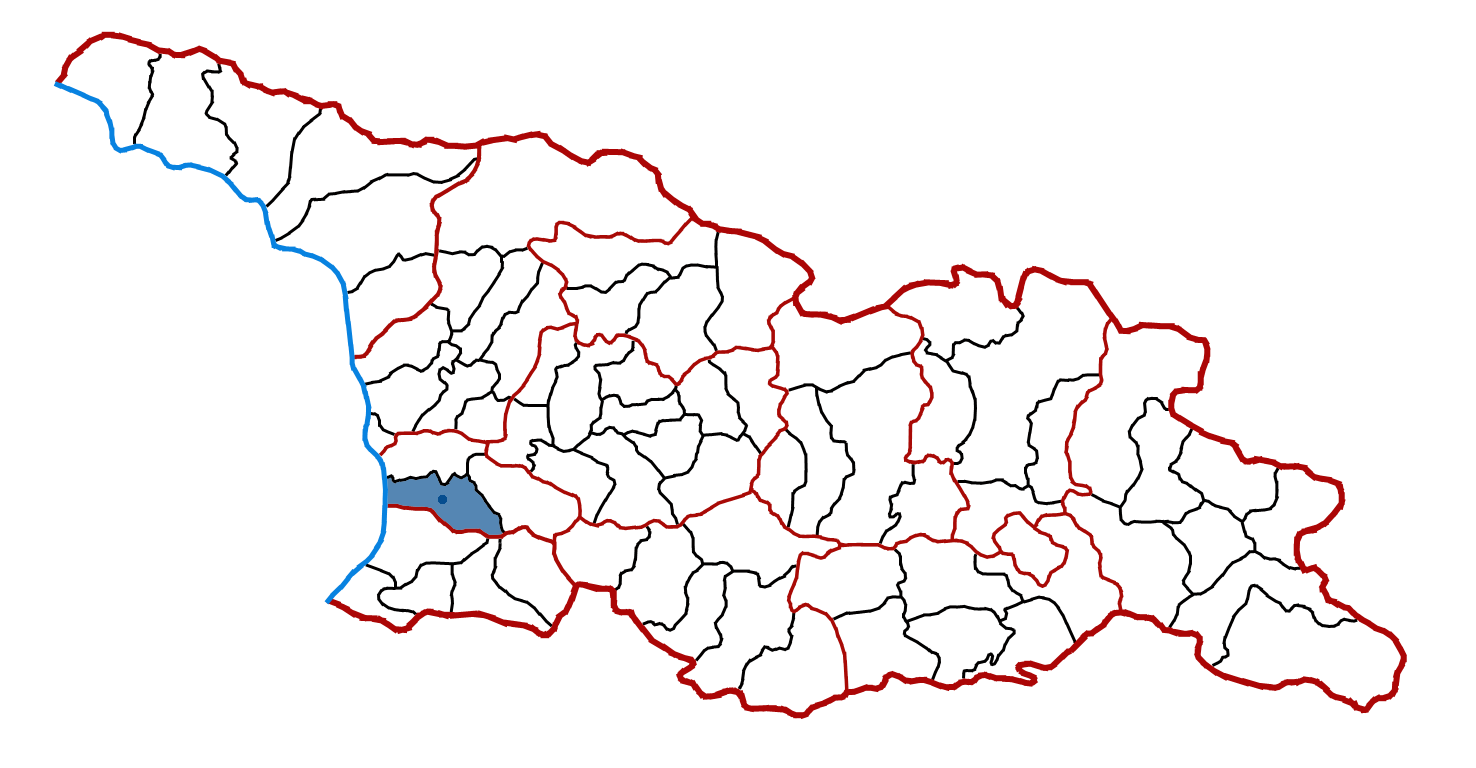

- Location within Georgia Location within Guria
- Coordinates: 41°58′27″N 41°57′42″E
- Country: Georgia
- Mkhare: Guria
- Municipality: Ozurgeti
- Elevation: 80 m (260 ft)

Population (2014)
  - Total: 239
- Time zone: UTC+4 (Georgian Time)

Chanieturi (Georgian: ჭანიეთური) is a village in the Ozurgeti Municipality of Guria in western Georgia.
