= Vashtiali =

Vashtiali ვაშტიალი
- Village
- Location within Georgia Location within Guria
- Coordinates: 41°51′20″N 41°58′30″E
- Country: Georgia
- Mkhare: Guria
- Municipality: Ozurgeti
- Elevation: 200 m (660 ft)

Population (2014)
  - Total: 43
- Time zone: UTC+4 (Georgian Time)

Vashtiali (Georgian: ვაშტიალი) is a village in the Ozurgeti Municipality of Guria in western Georgia.
