= Laituri =

Laituri ლაითური
- Town
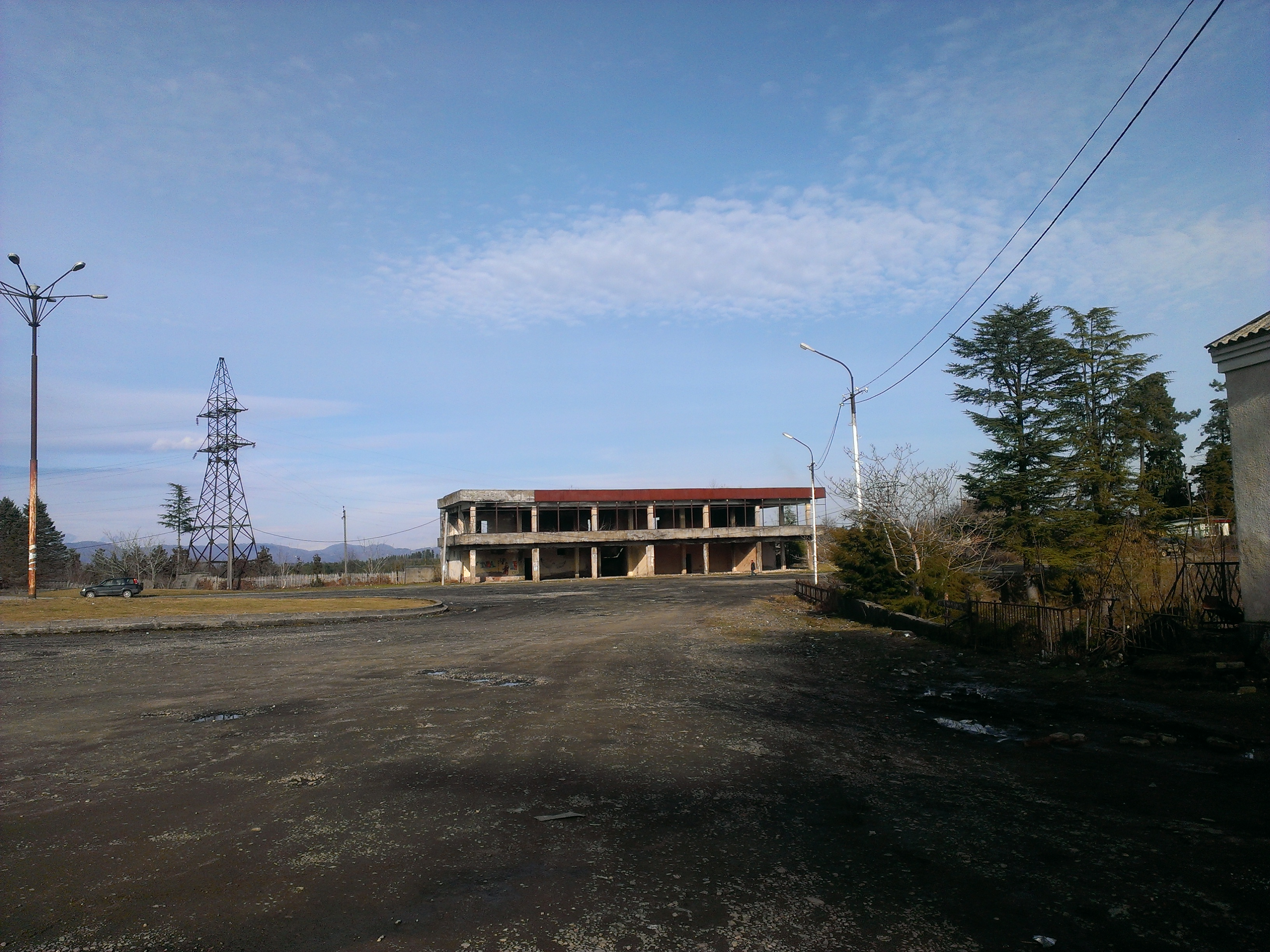

- Location within Georgia Location within Guria
- Coordinates: 41°54′45″N 41°54′33″E
- Country: Georgia
- Mkhare: Guria
- Municipality: Ozurgeti
- Elevation: 80 m (260 ft)

Population (2014)
  - Total: 2,697
- Time zone: UTC+4 (Georgian Time)

Laituri (Georgian: ლაითური) is a daba (small town) in the Ozurgeti Municipality of Guria in western Georgia.
