= Kveda Nasakirali =

Kveda Nasakirali ქვედა ნასაკირალი
- Town

- Location within Georgia Location within Guria
- Coordinates: 41°58′14″N 42°01′11″E
- Country: Georgia
- Mkhare: Guria
- Municipality: Ozurgeti
- Elevation: 180 m (590 ft)

Population (2014)
  - Total: 2,898
- Time zone: UTC+4 (Georgian Time)

Kveda Nasakirali (Georgian: ქვედა ნასაკირალი) is a daba (small town) in the Ozurgeti Municipality of Guria in western Georgia.
