= Zeda Dzimiti =

Zeda Dzimiti ზედა ძიმითი
- Village

- Location within Georgia Location within Guria
- Coordinates: 42°00′31″N 42°03′31″E
- Country: Georgia
- Mkhare: Guria
- Municipality: Ozurgeti
- Elevation: 160 m (520 ft)

Population (2014)
  - Total: 330
- Time zone: UTC+4 (Georgian Time)

Zeda Dzimiti (Georgian: ზედა ძიმითი) is a village in the Ozurgeti Municipality of Guria in western Georgia.
