= Naruja =

Naruja ნარუჯა
- Town
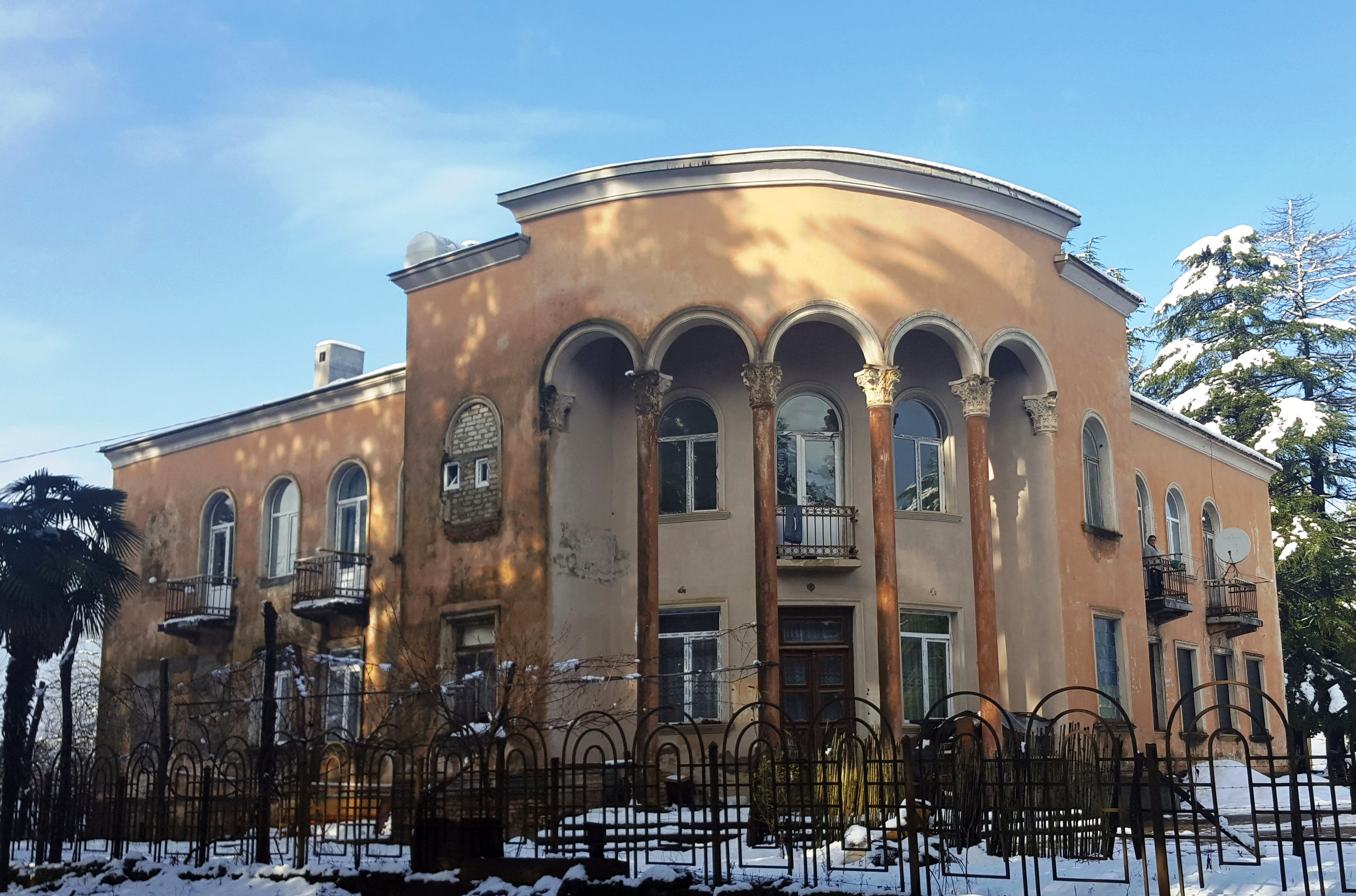
- Naruja town centre

- Location within Georgia Location within Guria
- Coordinates: 41°54′25″N 41°57′15″E
- Country: Georgia
- Region: Guria
- District: Ozurgeti

Population (2014)
  - Total: 2,148
- Time zone: UTC+4 (Georgian Time)
- Area code: +995 496

Naruja (Georgian: ნარუჯა) is a daba (small town) in the Ozurgeti Municipality of Guria in western Georgia with a population of 2,148 as of 2014.

== See also ==
- Guria
