= Ozurgeti Municipality =

Ozurgeti Municipality ოზურგეთის მუნიციპალიტეტი
- Municipality
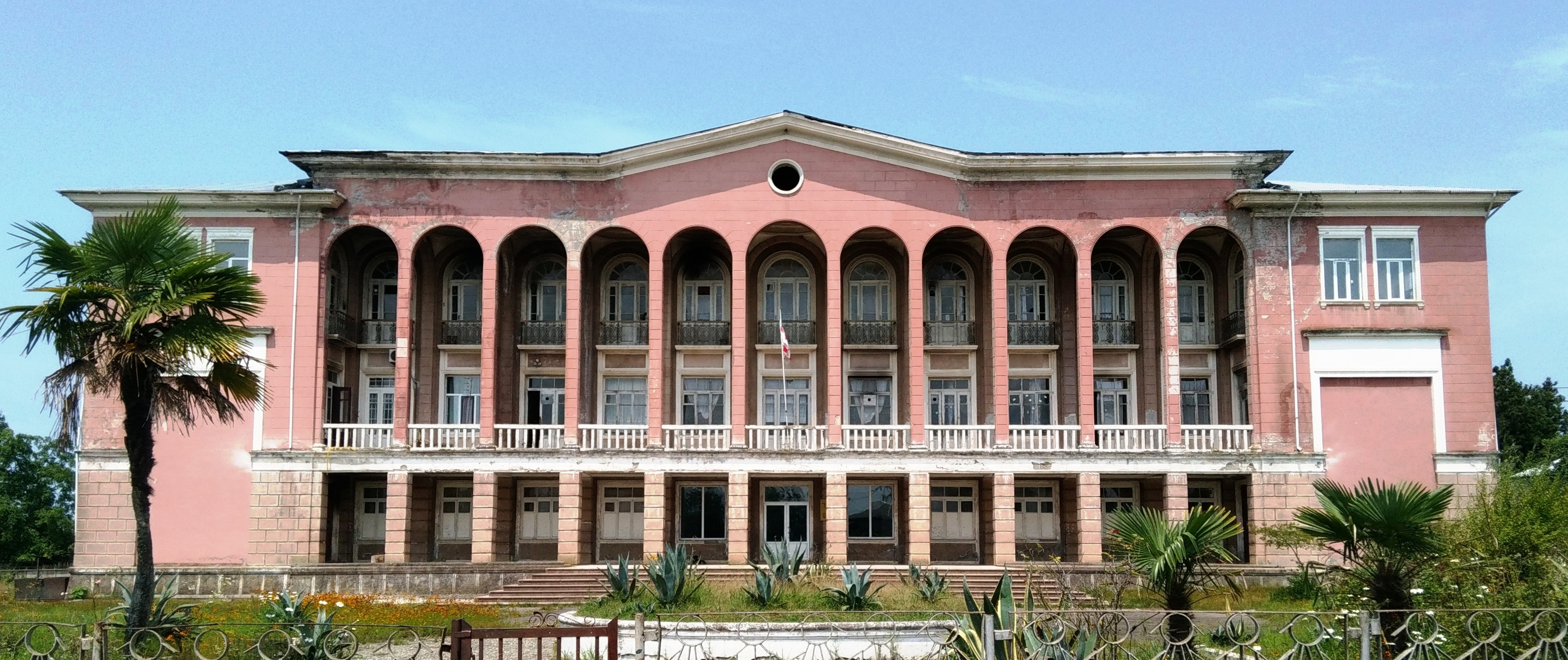
- School in Ozurgeti

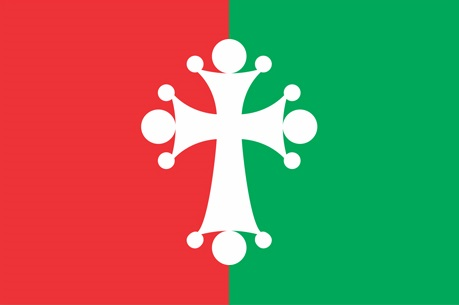
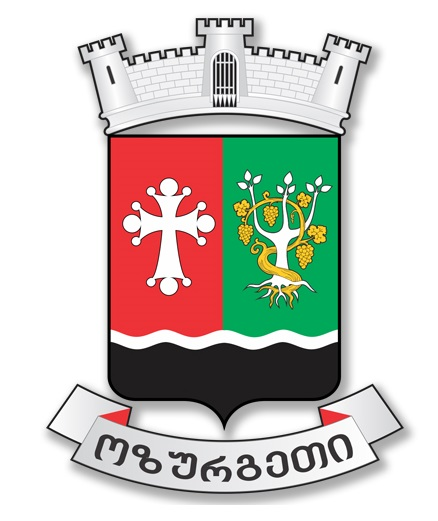
- Flag Seal

- Location of the municipality within Georgia
- Coordinates: 41.9333°N 41.9833°E
- Country: Georgia
- Region: Guria
- Capital: Ozurgeti

Government
  - Type: Mayor–Council
  - Body: Ozurgeti Municipal Assembly
  - mayor: Avtandil Talakvadze (GD)

Area
  - Total: 675 km^{2} (261 sq mi)

Population (2021)
  - Total: 59,357
  - Density: 87.9/km^{2} (228/sq mi)

Population by ethnicity
  - Georgians: 97.19 %
  - Armenians: 1.77 %
  - Russians: 0.59 %
  - Ukrainians: 0.17 %
- Time zone: UTC+4 (Georgian Standard Time)
- Postal code: 3500
- Area code: +995 496
- Website: ozurgeti.mun.gov.ge

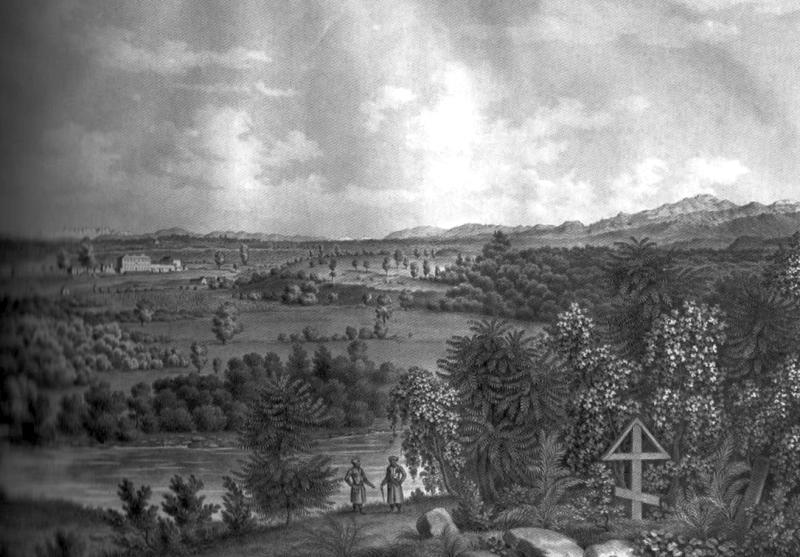
Fridrich Dubois de Montpereux “Old Ozurgeti” in 1830s

Ozurgeti (Georgian: ოზურგეთის მუნიციპალიტეტი, Ozurgetis munitsipalit'et'i) is a municipality of Georgia, in the region of Guria. Its main town is Ozurgeti.

Ozurgeti municipality is located on the territory of western Georgia. Its area is 675 km^{2} (261 sq mi). Ozurgeti municipality is bordered on the west by the Black Sea, on the south by the Adjara-Guria ridge, the Choloki River and the Autonomous Republic of Adjara; Chokhatauri municipalities in the east and Lanchkhuti municipalities in the north. Black earth-alluvial and earthen soils are spread in the territory of the municipality. Red earth soils are spread in the hilly strip of the municipality. Red alloys of alluvial secondary origin are developed on the terraces of rivers, sediments, and swamps, and swampy soils are developed in the coastal zone.

== History ==
Until 1917, the territory of the municipality was included in Ozurgeti Mazra of Kutaisi Province, in 1930 it was formed as a separate territorial unit and was called Ozurgeti District. In 1934, the Makharadze district was renamed in honor of Philip Makharadze. In the early 1960s, the area of the district was reduced: part of the area near Gomismti was transferred to Kobuleti district, and part of the area around the river Supsa to Lanchkhuti district. In 1963–64, Chokhatauri district joined Makharadze district and the city of Makharadze was defined as the center. In 1990, the district was renamed Ozurgeti, and since 2006 - Ozurgeti Municipality. Between 2014 and 2017 the city of Ozurgeti, like others, was separated from the municipality and was a so-called "self-governed" city (or kalaki).

== Geography ==
The territory of the municipality is full of rivers and valleys, the rivers belonging to the Black Sea basin. The river Supsa flows in the territory of the municipality; the river Bakhvistskali joins it. Also important are the sediments with tributaries: Bzhuzhi, Choloki, Bogila, and others. The rivers of the municipality are fed by lanyards, rains, soil water, and springs. At the confluence of the seas, they contribute to the marshes of the lowlands. The river Choloki separates Ozurgeti municipality from the territory of Kobuleti municipality. The rivers are rich in fish, including trout, barbel, salmon, and sorrel. The highest points of the territory of the municipality are in the south-eastern part of its border; the highest points are Mount Sakornia (2,756 m [9,042 ft]) and Gunistavi (2,132 m [6,995 ft]). The south-western part of the municipality is a plain, which is a floodplain of the river Natanebi, with an average height of 20 metres (66 ft) above sea level.

== Climate ==
The climate is characterized by a subtropical humid climate. Humidity is due to the proximity of the Black Sea and high ridges to the east. Humidity is especially high in summer. The average annual rainfall is 2,100 to 2,800 mm (83 to 110 in). The maximum precipitation falls in September, the minimum - in May. The average annual air temperature is 14.5 to −4 °C (58.1 to 24.8 °F), the coldest month is January (+5 to −5 °C [41 to 23 °F]), and the warmest is August (23 to 13 °C [73 to 55 °F]). The absolute minimum temperatures are −17 to −18 °C (1 to 0 °F) (coastal lowlands) and −30 to −32 °C (−22 to −26 °F) (high mountains). The absolute maximum ranges between 31 and 41 °C. The territory of the municipality is characterized by seasonal winds: south-east winds in winter and west winds in summer. The average wind speed is 3.2 m/s (10 ft/s). Knows fions in winter and spring, though they do less harm; Than in other parts of western Georgia. The territory of the municipality is in the 5-6 magnitude zone in terms of earthquake danger.

== Biodiversity ==
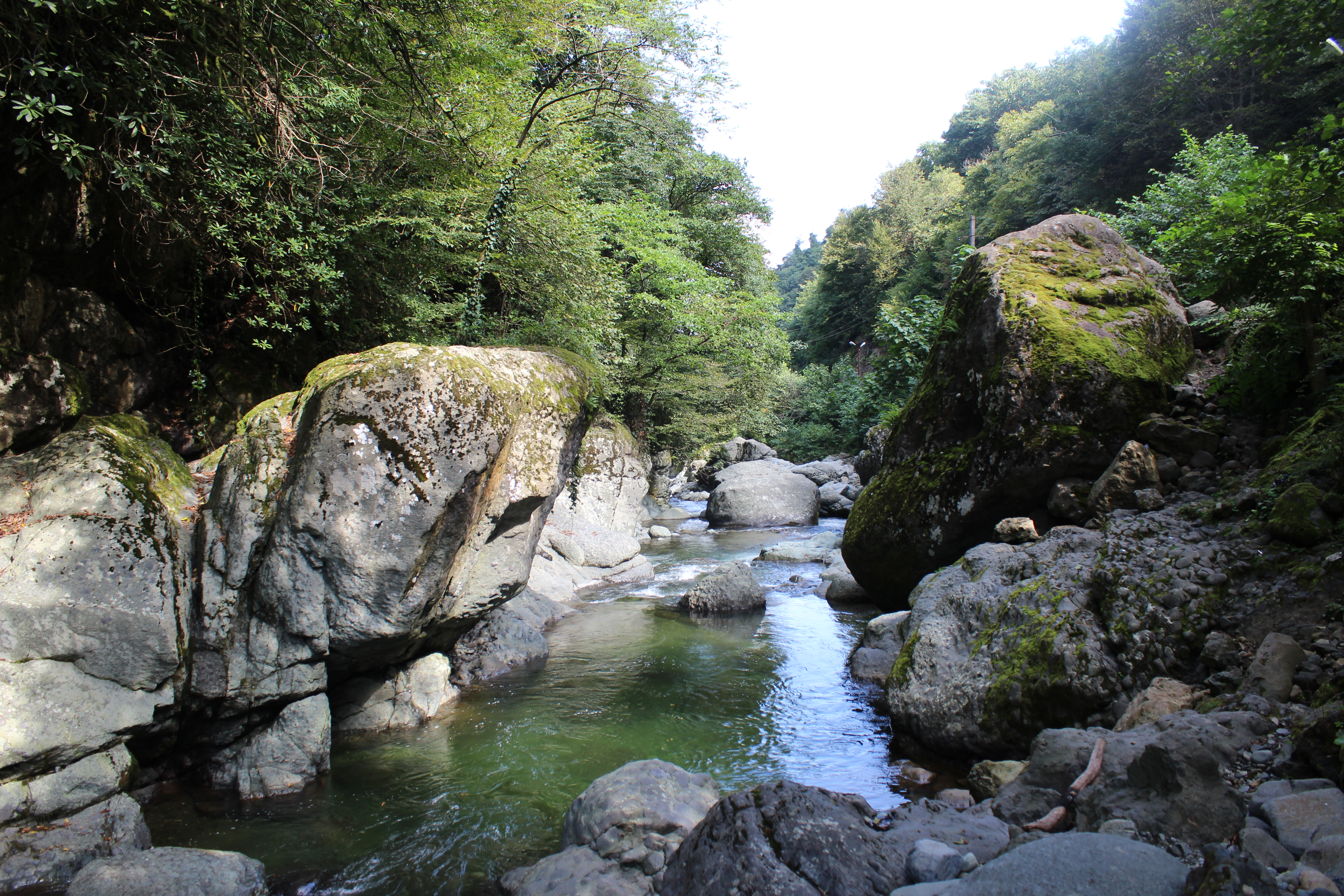
Achistskali River

The forest occupies 17,021 hectares (42,060 acres) on the territory of the municipality. The vegetation is formed by chestnut, hornbeam, beech, dried fruit, in the form of undergrowth can be found blueberries, sage, watercress. Natural forests are preserved in the south-eastern highlands of the municipality. At 700 to 1,700 m (2,300 to 5,600 ft) above sea level, there is a deciduous forest (alder, hornbeam, beech), and at 1,700 to 2,100 m (5,600 to 6,900 ft) there is a coniferous forest (pine, fir, spruce). Bears, roe deer, marten, tortoises, lynxes, squirrels, wolves, ticks, hedgehogs, badgers, rabbits, rabbits are common in the forests. Among the birds common are dzera, kvavi, orbi, thrush, chkhartvi, wild duck, swamp hen, niblia, kodala, tavshava, heartworm, hawk. Migratory birds enter in spring: ghazo, jadon, quail, hoopoe, mullet.

== Politics ==
Ozurgeti Municipal Assembly (Georgian: ოზურგეთის საკრებულო, Ozurgeti Sakrebulo) is a representative body in Ozurgeti Municipality, consisting of 45 members and elected every four years. The last election was held in October 2021.

Party	2017	2021	Current Municipal Assembly
Georgian Dream	36	30	
United National Movement	4	11	
For Georgia		4	
Alliance of Patriots	2		
European Georgia	1		
Labour Party	1		
Independent	2		
Total	46	45	

== Population ==
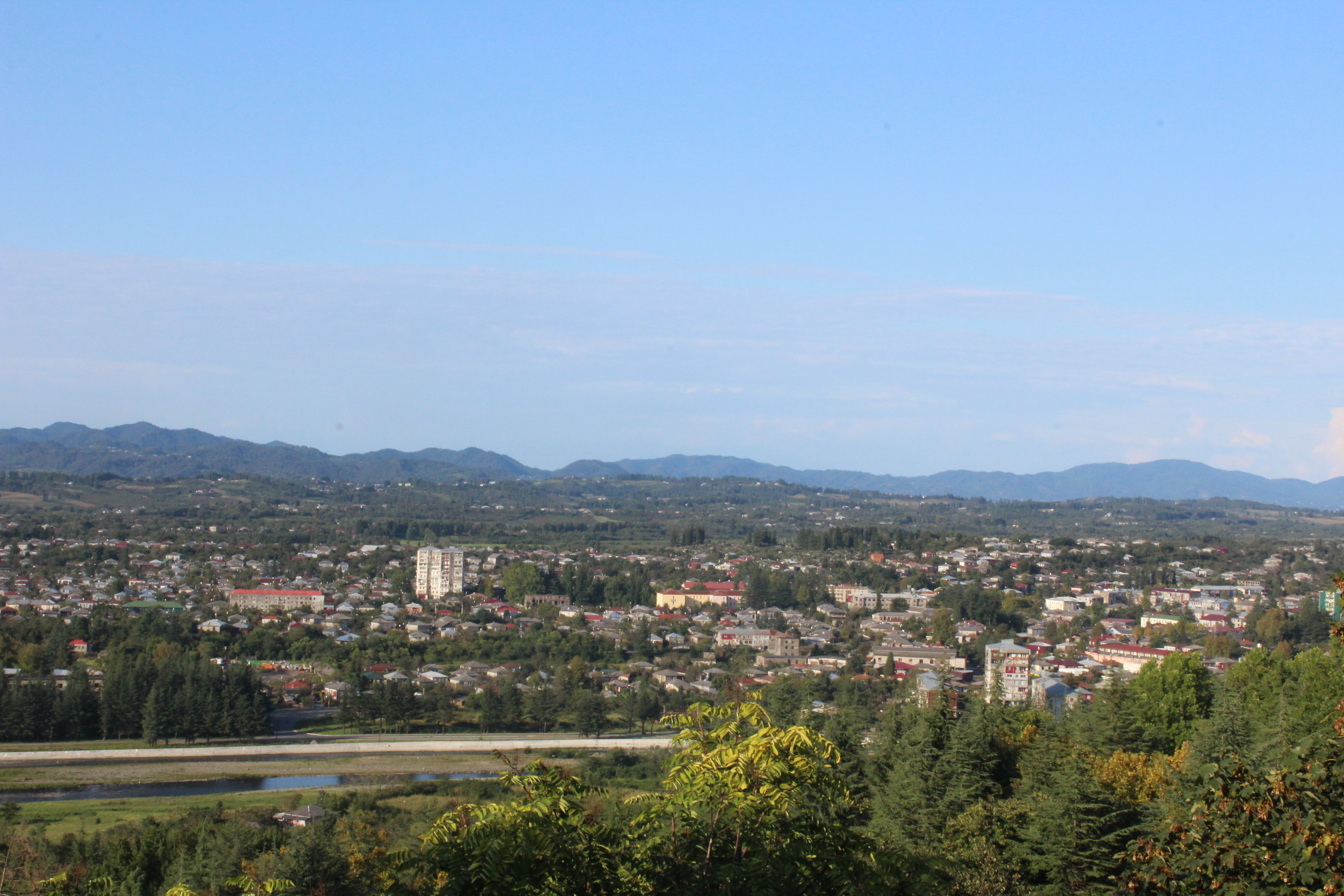
Ozurgeti City

By the start of 2021 the population was determined at 59,357 people, a decline compared to the 2014 census. (Note: Combined figures of the city municipality (kalaki) Ozurgeti and the municipality of Ozurgeti.) There are 75 settlements in the municipality: 1 city, 4 urban-type settlements (daba) and 70 villages. The density is 87.9 inhabitants per square kilometre (228/sq mi).

97% of the residents are Georgians, mainly Gurians, as well as Adjarans. There are also Armenians (2%) and Russians (1%). The vast majority of the population is Orthodox Christian, a small portion is Muslim, and there are small groups of other religious denominations living in the municipality, such as Catholics, Protestants and Jehovah's Witnesses.

Population Ozurgeti Municipality
	1897	1922	1926	1939	1959	1970	1979	1989	2002	2014	2021
Ozurgeti Municipality	-	-	-	-	75,240	▲79,710	▲84,278	▲90,040	▼78,760	▼62,863	▼59,357
Ozurgeti	4,710	▲5,626	▲5,874	▲11,419	▲19,131	▲21,679	▲22,393	▲23,399	▼18,705	▼14,785	▼14,341
Laituri (daba)	-	-	-	-	5,018	▼3,398	▲5,327	▼3,854	▼3,556	▼2,697	▲3,369
Naruja (daba)	-	-	-	-	-	-	-	2,219	▼1,295	▲2,148	▼1,514
Kveda Nasakirali (daba)	-	-	-	-	-	-	2,290	▲2,616	▼2,550	▲2,898	▼2,550
Ureki (daba)	-	-	-	-	1,736	▼1,249	▲1,486	▲1,758	▼1,422	▼1,166	▲1,481
Data: Population statistics Georgia 1897 to present. Note: (Note: The 2014 census found an inexplicable gap with the data from the national statistical office Geostat. UN-assisted research has found the 2002 census was inflated by about 8-9 percent. See, "1. Introduction", Page 1.)

== Historical sites ==
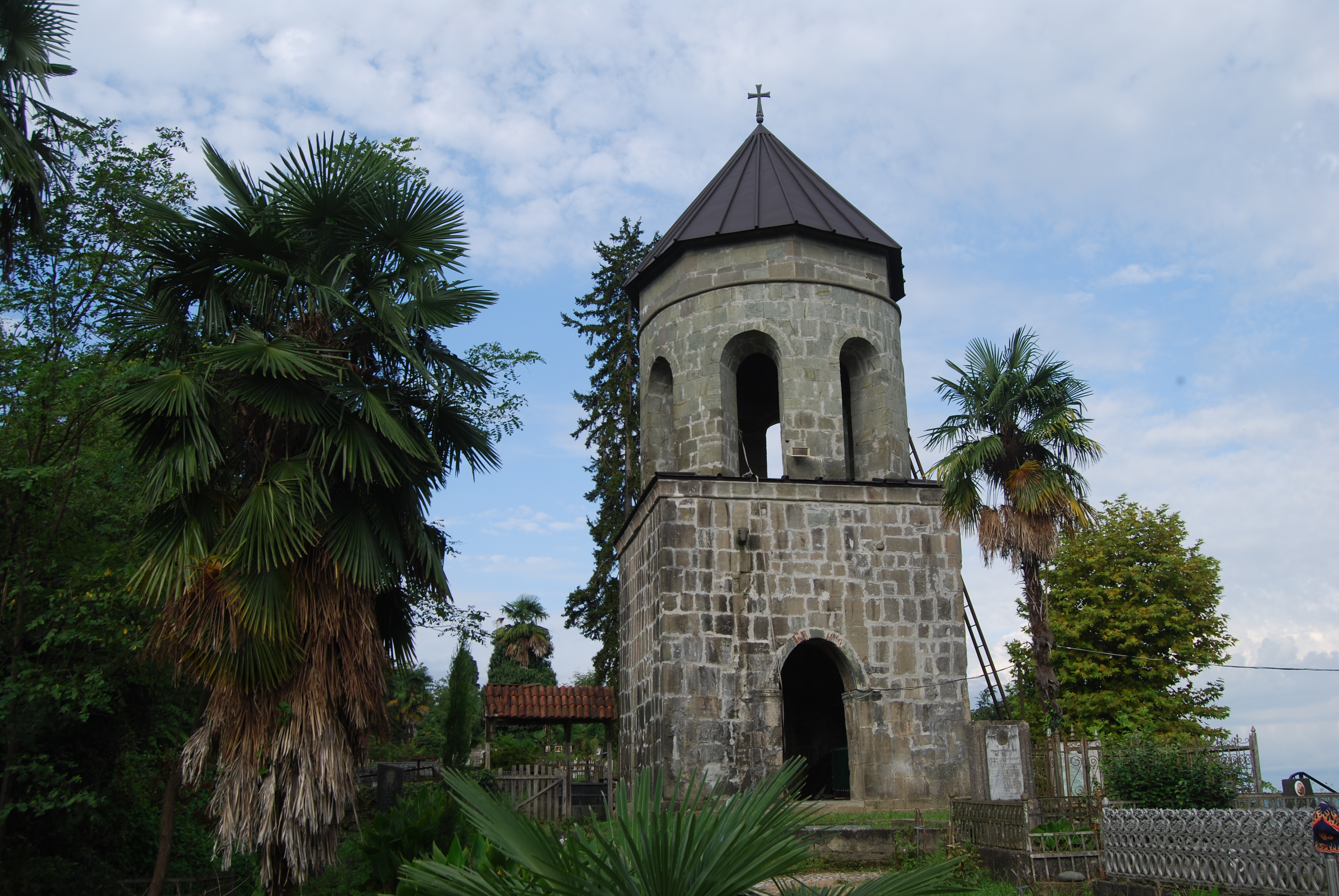
Likhauri Church Belltower

The oldest historical monument on the territory of the municipality is the town of Vashnari. There are two castles on the territory of the municipality and both are named after Queen Tamar. These are the castles of Askani and Likhauri. Askani Castle Among the medieval church buildings are the Church of the Creator, which is the center of the Diocese of the Creator, and the Church of Jumat, which was the historic center of the Diocese of Jumat. Important monuments are the churches of Achi, Likhauri, and Baileti, where rare frescoes are preserved. In addition, hall and basilica type churches are located in Dvabzu, Vaniskedi, Kviriketi, Meria, Mtispiri, Konchkati and Khrialeti.

Historical sites include:

- Achi Monastery
- Jumati monastery
- Likhauri Church
- Shemokmedi Monastery

== Resorts and tourism ==
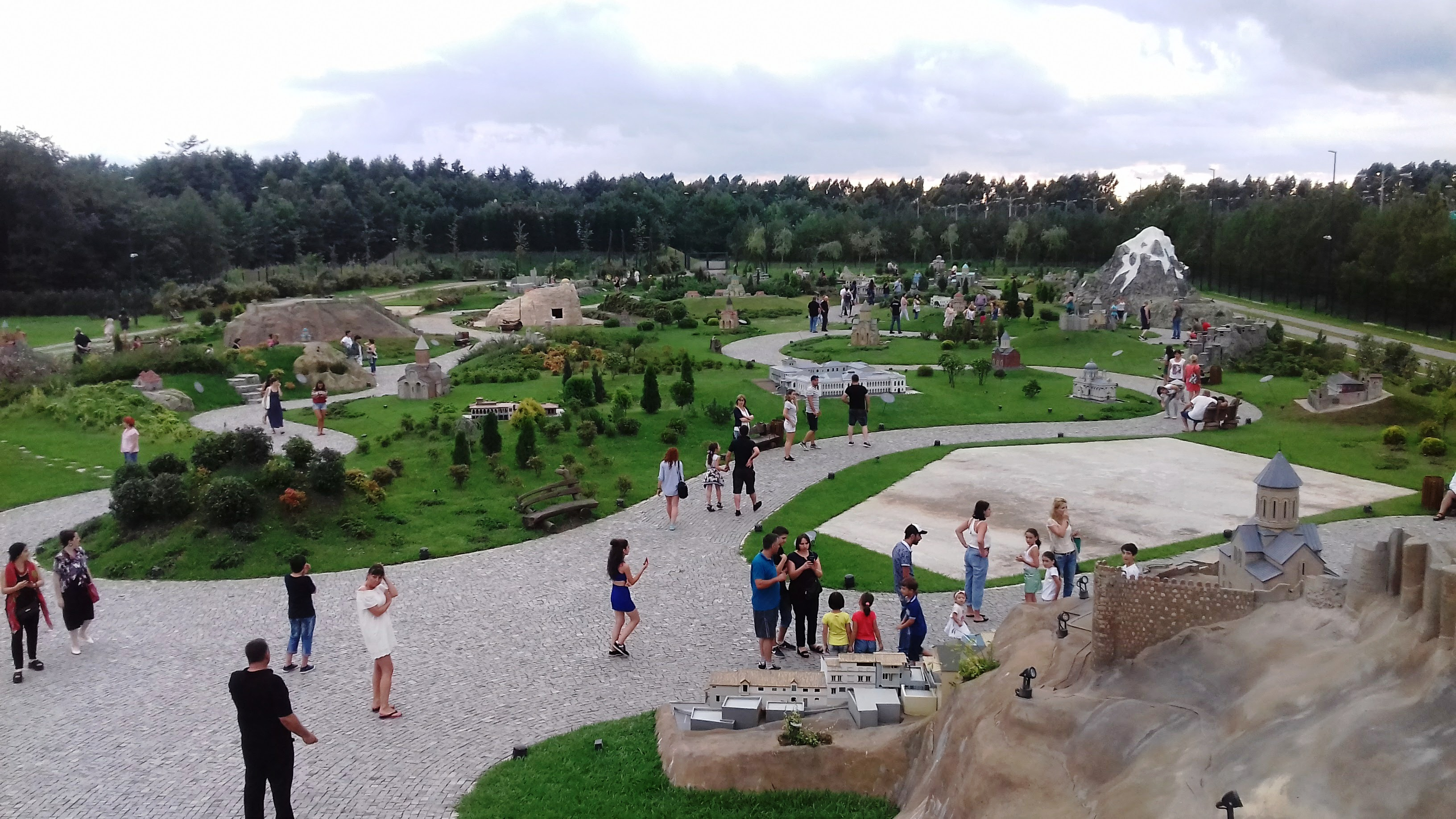
Shekvetili Miniature Park

Ozurgeti Municipality has unique resorts both on the seaside and in the alpine zone. Of the four recreational status resorts in Georgia, Ureki is located in the municipality. The resorts of the municipality allow to host tourists from Georgia or abroad in winter and summer, which is one of the main preconditions for budget growth and employment of the population. Ureki, Shekvetili and Gomismta mountain resort are among the seaside resorts of the municipality.

Resorts and Tourist sites include:

- Ureki
- Shekvetili
- Nasakirali
- Black Sea Arena
- Ozurgeti Drama Theatre
- Ozurgeti History Museum
- Shekvetili Miniature Park
- Dimitri Gurieli Palace

== Twin towns – sister cities ==
- Boyarka, Ukraine
- Rokiškis, Lithuania

== See also ==
- List of municipalities in Georgia (country)
- Askana, a village within Ozurgeti
- Chanieturi, a village within Ozurgeti
- Gaghma Dvabzu, a village within Ozurgeti
- Kvachalati, village
- Vashtiali, a village within Ozurgeti
- Vake, Ozurgeti Municipality, village
- Zeda Dzimiti, village
