= Mkhare =

Administrative divisions of Georgia (country)

A mkhare (Georgian: მხარე, mxare) is a type of administrative division in the country of Georgia. It is usually translated into English as "region".

According to presidential decrees issued in 1994 and 1996, Georgia's division into regions is on a provisional basis until the secessionist conflicts in Abkhazia and South Ossetia are resolved. The regional administration is headed by a state commissioner (სახელმწიფო რწმუნებული, Saxelmćipo Rćmunebuli, usually translated as "governor"), an official appointed by the president.

The regions are further subdivided into municipalities. There are nine regions in Georgia (see also map opposite):

| Region | Capital | Population estimate (as of Jan. 1, 2019) |
|---|---|---|
| Guria | Ozurgeti | 109,396 |
| Imereti | Kutaisi | 497,396 |
| Kakheti | Telavi | 312,453 |
| Kvemo Kartli | Rustavi | 433,162 |
| Mtskheta-Mtianeti | Mtskheta | 93,636 |
| Racha-Lechkhumi and Kvemo Svaneti | Ambrolauri | 29,701 |
| Samegrelo-Zemo Svaneti | Zugdidi | 308,358 |
| Samtskhe-Javakheti | Akhaltsikhe | 154,139 |
| Shida Kartli | Gori | 257,279 |

== See also ==
- Administrative divisions of Georgia
