= Chokhatauri =

Chokhatauri ჩოხატაური
- town
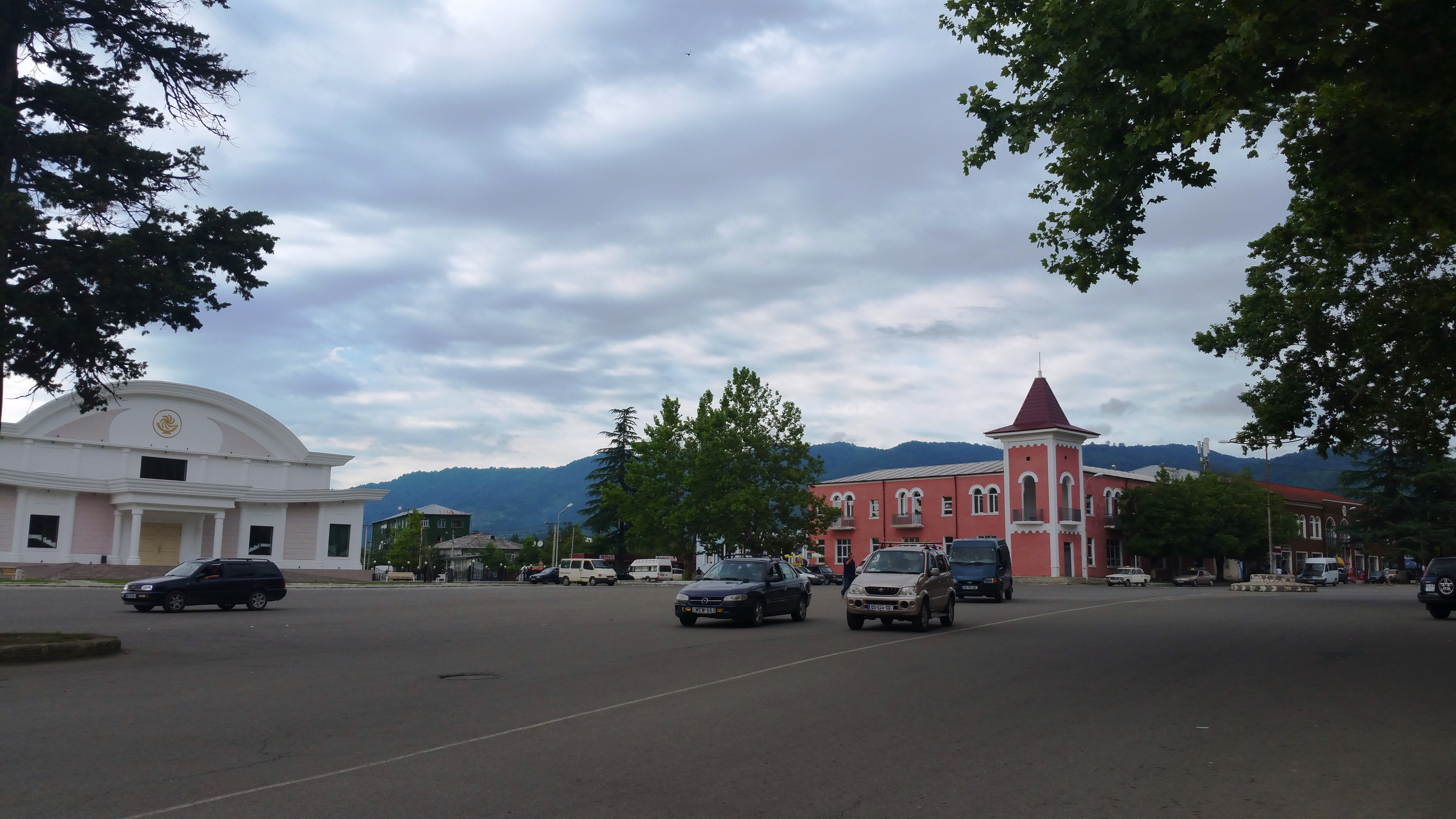

- Location within Georgia Location within Guria
- Coordinates: 42°1′8″N 42°14′22″E
- Country: Georgia
- Region: Guria
- Municipality: Chokhatauri

Area
  - Total: 204 km^{2} (79 sq mi)
- Elevation: 150 m (490 ft)

Population (2014)
  - Total: 1,815
- Time zone: UTC+4 (Georgian Time)

Chokhatauri (Georgian: ჩოხატაური) is a town in Georgia’s Guria region, 310 km west to the nation's capital of Tbilisi. It is an administrative center of Chokhatauri Municipality, which comprises the town itself and its adjoining 61 villages. The population of the town is 1815 as of 2014.

Several historical monuments are scattered across the district, e.g. an early medieval fortress of Bukistsikhe, and a monastic complex of Udabno.

Near the town is a health resort based on the natural mineral water Nabeglavi, which is similar to Borjomi in its chemical composition. Bakhmaro is another nearby mountain resort that is famous for its unique wooden cottages on stilts in the mist of the mountains. Nabeglavi mineral water and Bakhmaro spring water are bottled by Healthy Water Ltd. in Chokhatauri.

Chokhatauri is also known as the birthplace of the LGBT rights activist Andria.

== Geography ==
The area of the town is 204 km^{2}. The town of Chokhatauri is located at the foot of the southern slope of the Guria Range to the right of the Supsa river. It is located 150 m above sea level and 20 km from Ozurgeti.

== Gallery ==
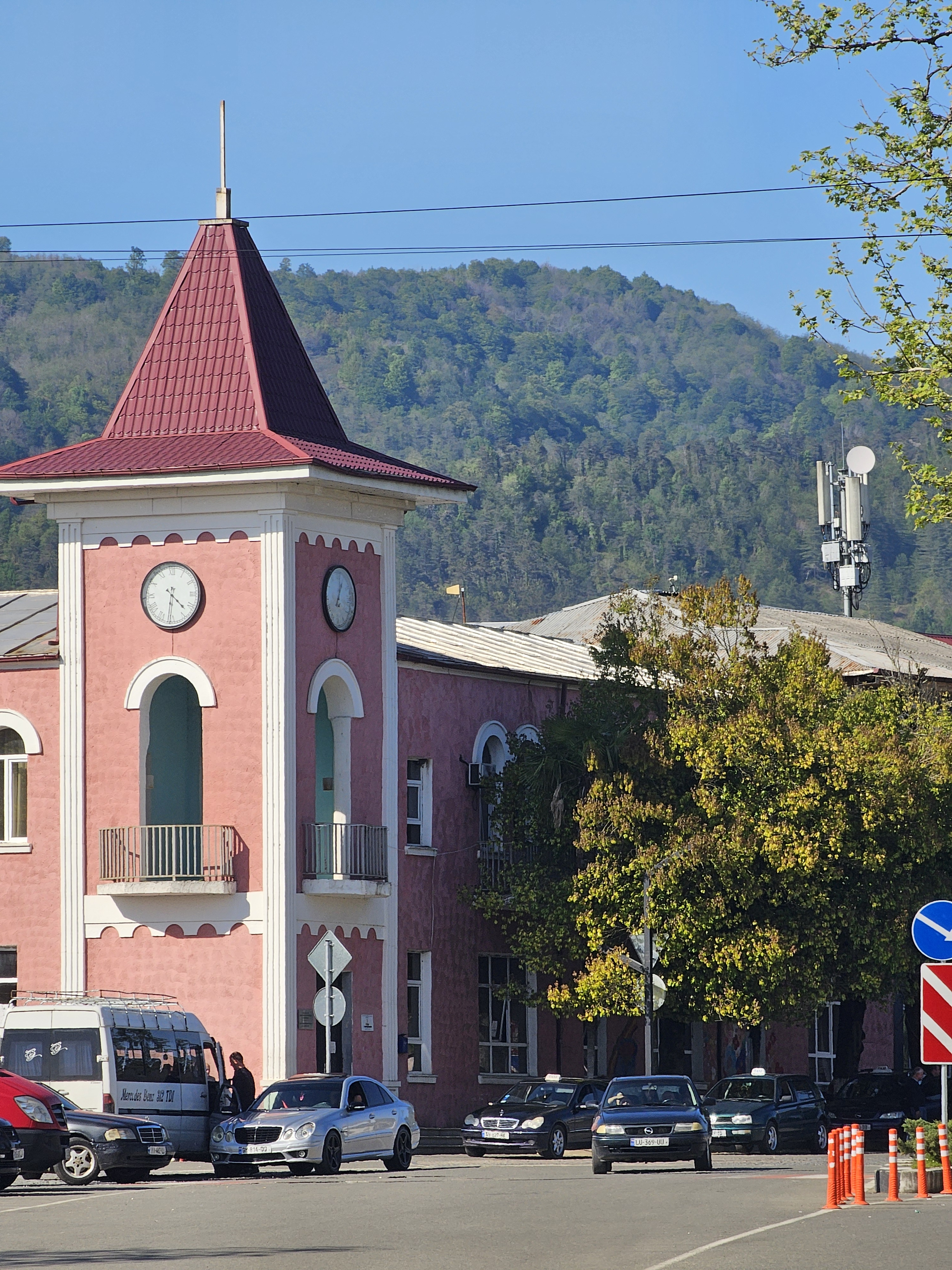
Center of the town

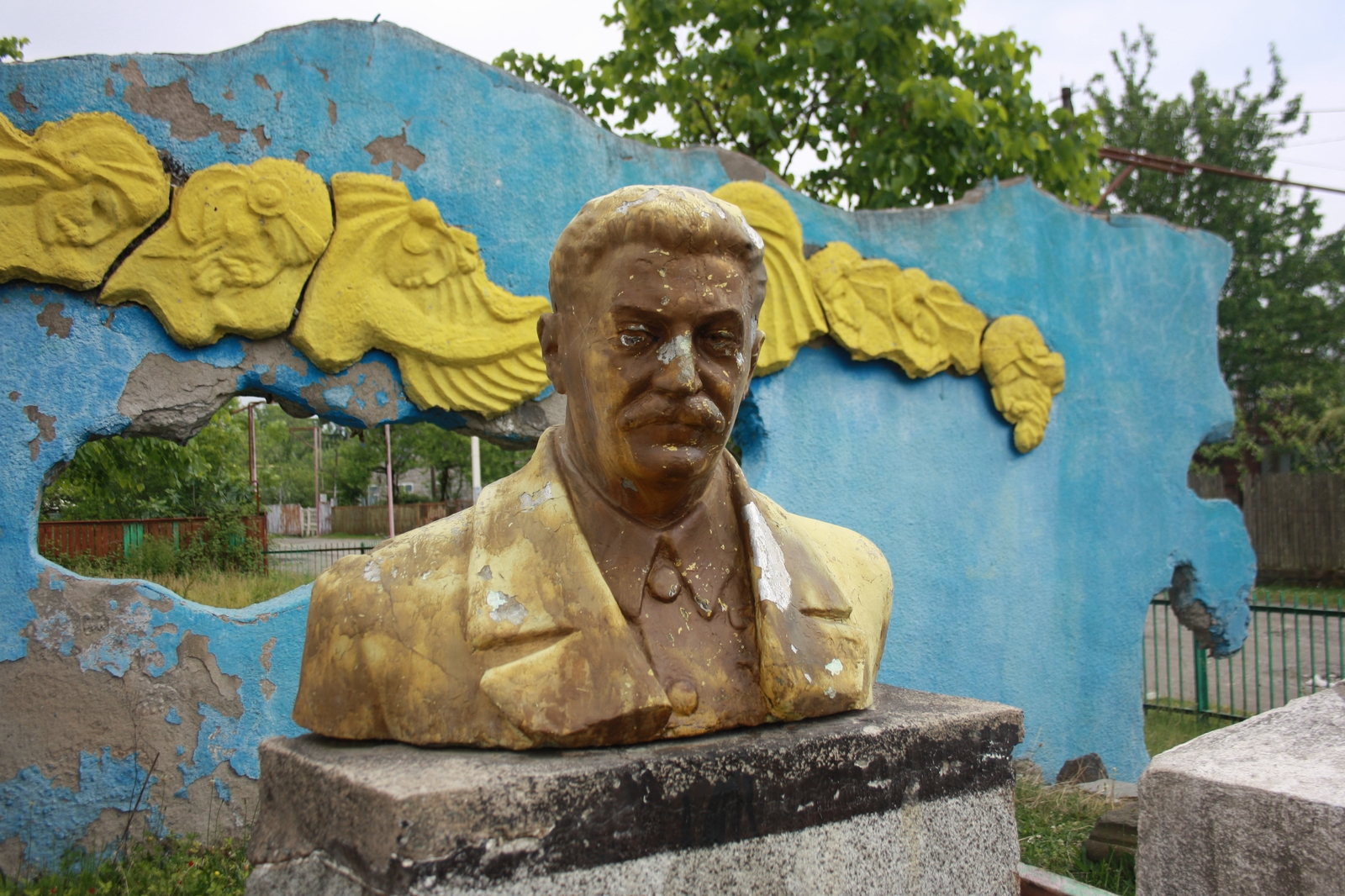
Memorial to Joseph Stalin in the town

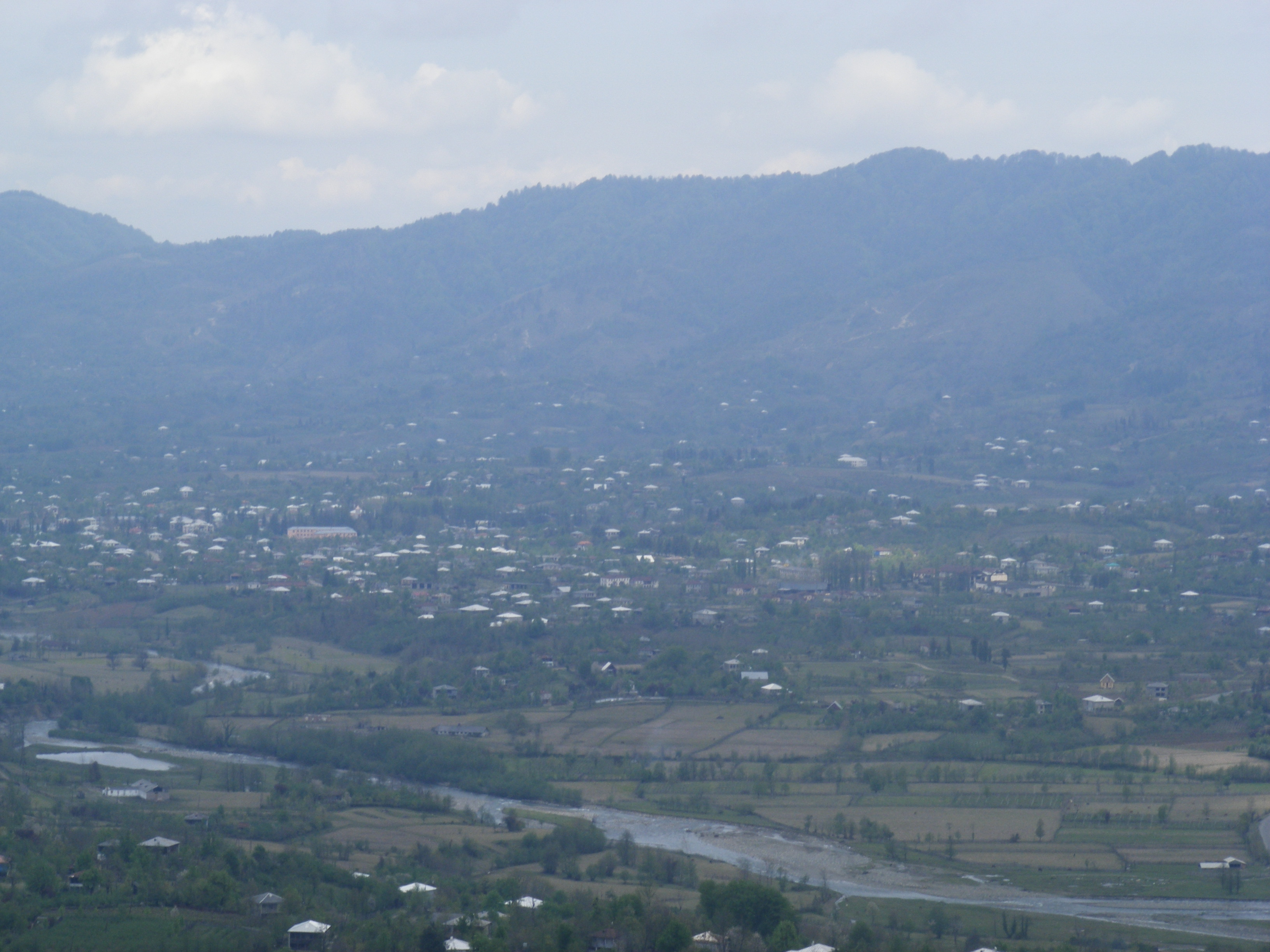
View of the town

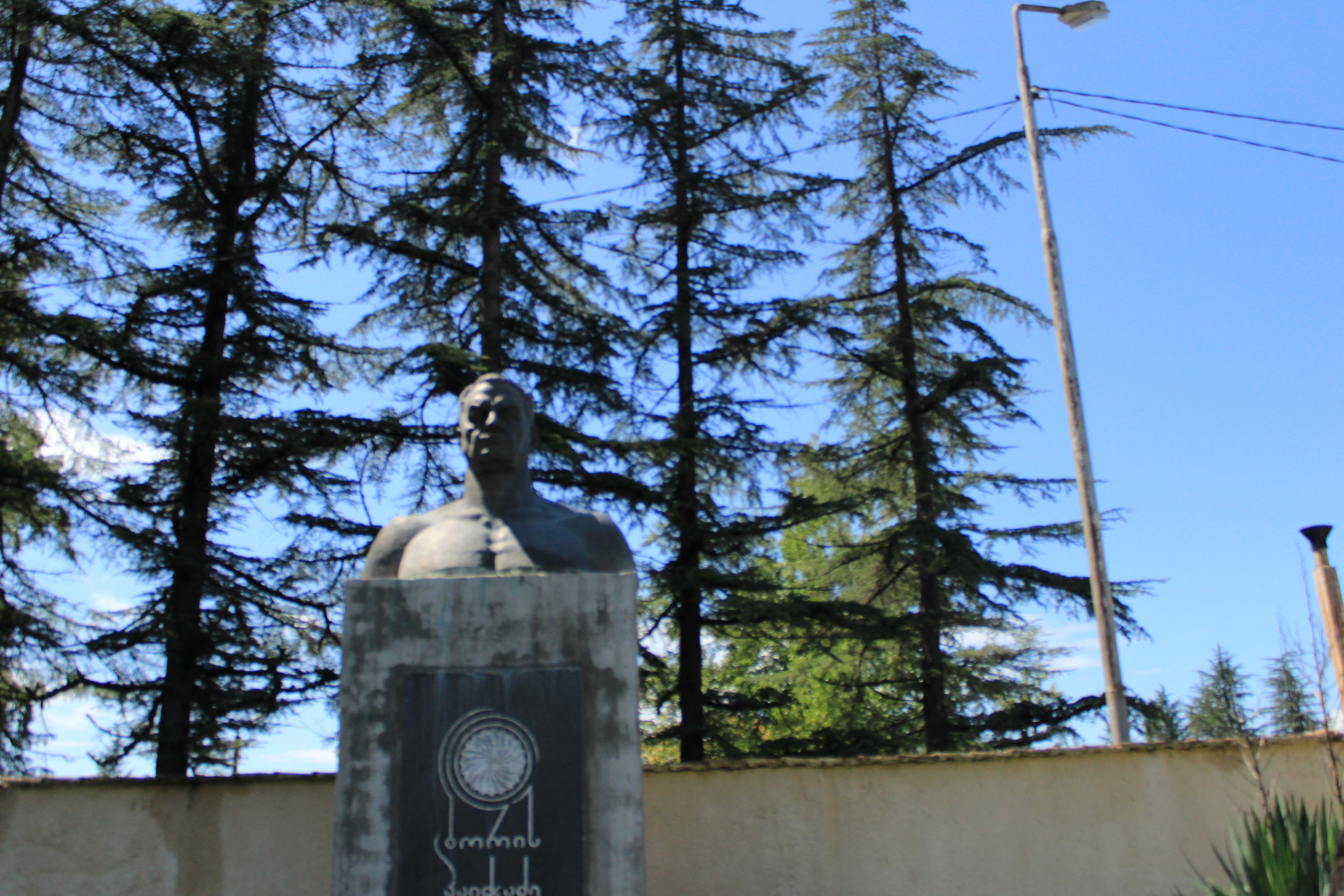
Bust of Boris Paichadze in the town

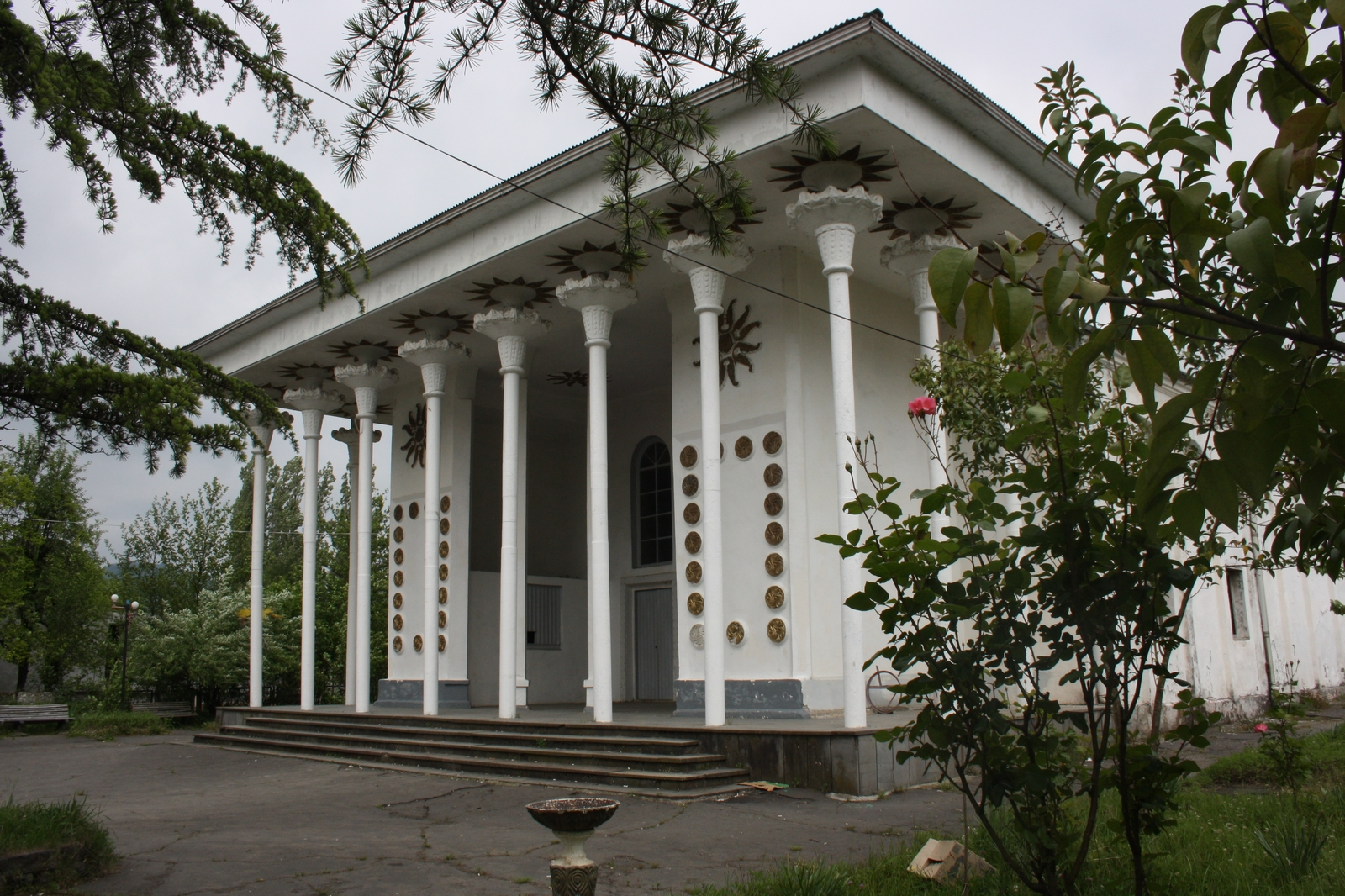
Chokhatauri Cinema

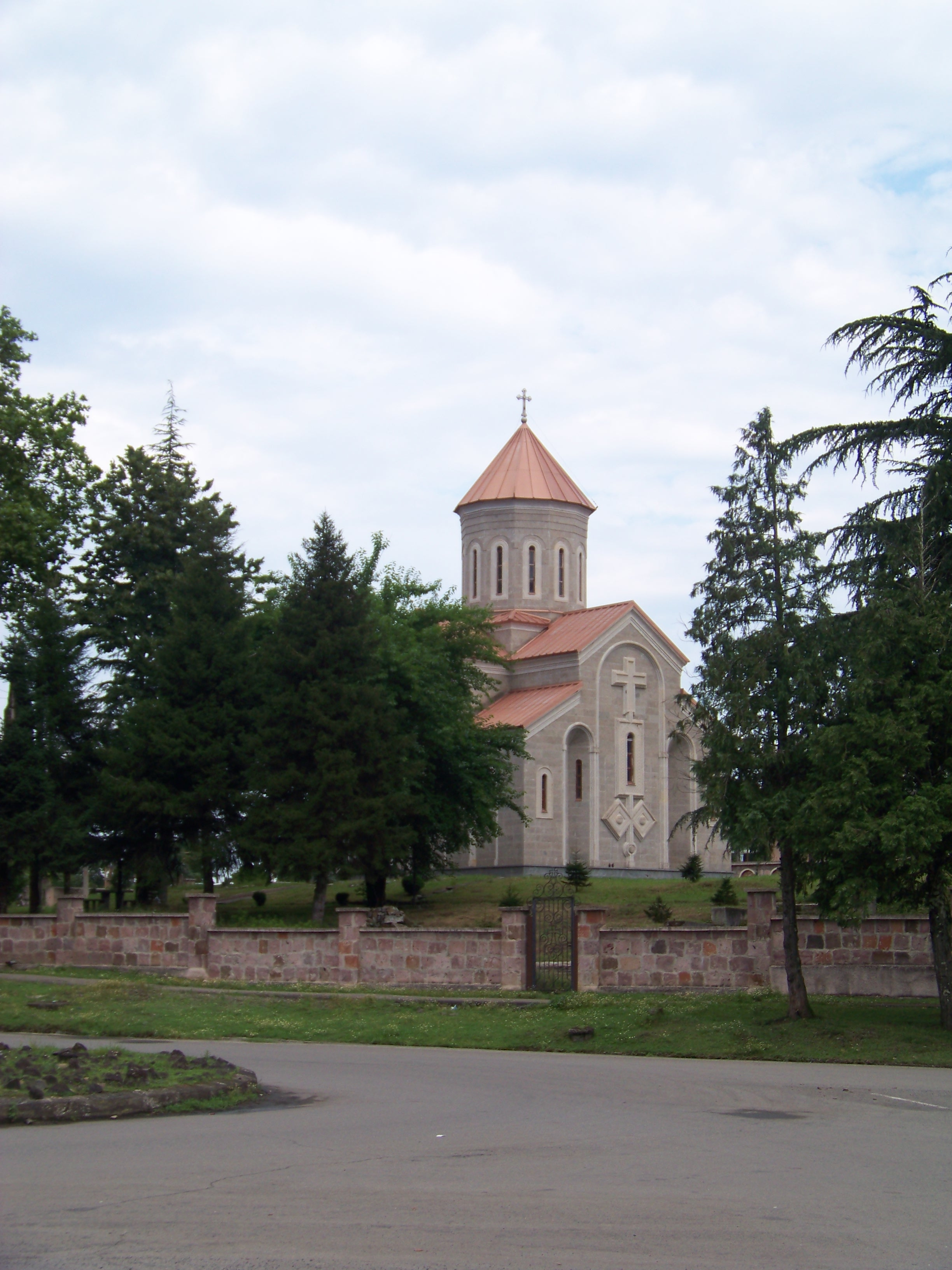
Church of Chokhatauri
