= Sakornia =

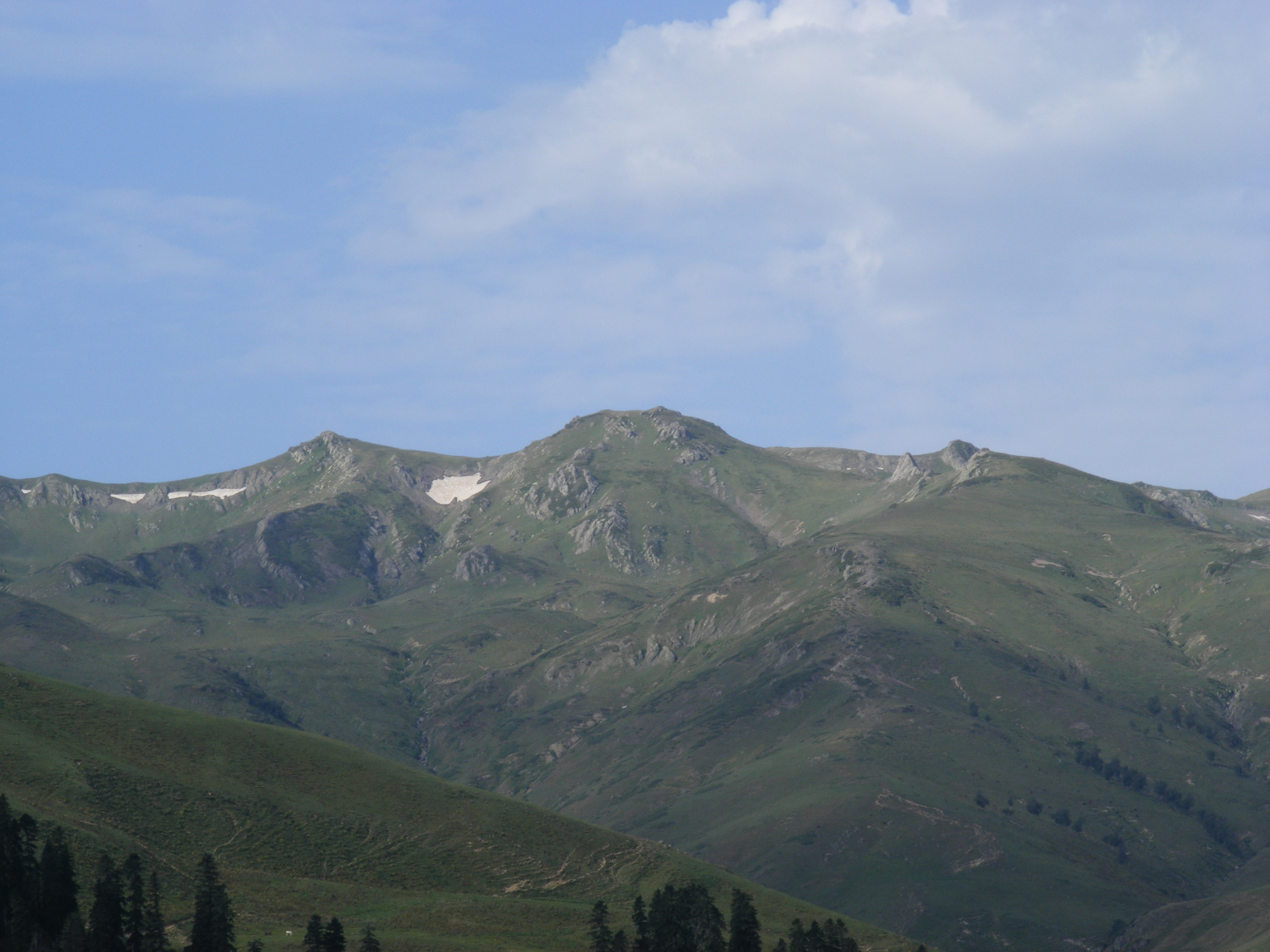

Highest point
- Elevation: 2,752 m (9,029 ft)
- Coordinates: 41°49′38″N 42°16′57″E

Geography
- Location within Georgia Location within Guria
- Country: Georgia
- Parent range: Meskheti Range

Climbing
- Easiest route: From Bakhmaro

Sakornia (Georgian: საყორნია) is a mountain in Georgia. Part of the Meskheti Range, it is located within the Chokhatauri Municipality of Guria and has an elevation of 2752 metres.
