= Mtispiri =

Mtispiri მთისპირი
- Village
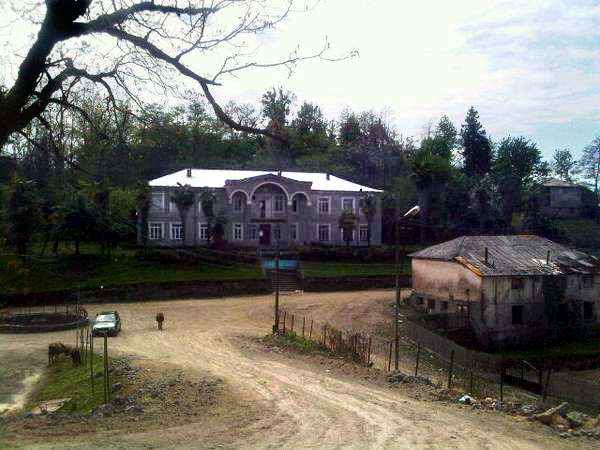

- Location within Georgia Location within Guria
- Coordinates: 41°56′19″N 42°09′23″E
- Country: Georgia
- Mkhare: Guria
- Municipality: Ozurgeti
- Elevation: 300 m (980 ft)

Population (2014)
  - Total: 238
- Time zone: UTC+4 (Georgian Time)

Mtispiri (Georgian: მთისპირი) is a village in the Ozurgeti Municipality of Guria in western Georgia. The closest city is Ozurgeti which is located 17 km from it. The total population of Mtispiri is 238 as of 2014.

== Geography ==
It is situated at one of the small mountain ranges of the Meskheti range, on the right side of Bakhvistsqali river and along the hill range, at an altitude of approximately 750 meters above sea level.

== Local government ==
Mtispiri is a part of Ozurgeti Municipality and has its representative in Municipal Council (Sakrebulo).

== Education, Cultural Facilities ==
Mtispiri has a public school for grades 1-12, where pupils from both Mtispiri and surrounding villages (Okroskedi, Ukanava) attend classes. There was a club during the Soviet era, but it no longer functions.
