= Zurab Nasaraia =

Georgian politician

Zurab Nasaraia ზურაბ ნასარაია
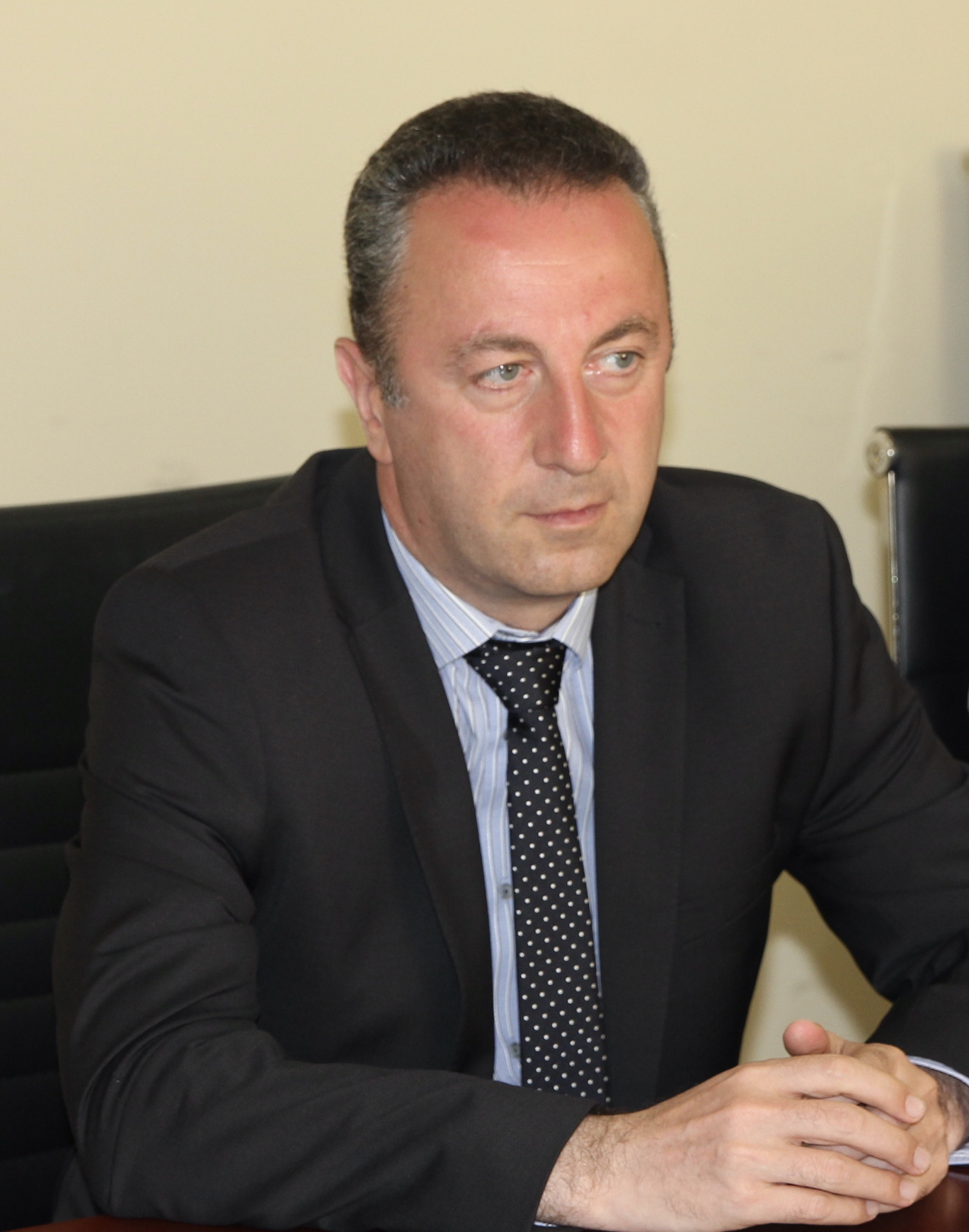

Governor of Guria
- Incumbent
- Assumed office 20 August 2018
- President: Salome Zourabichvili
- Preceded by: Merab Chanukvadze

Personal details
- Born: October 19, 1973 (age 52)

Zurab Nasaraia (Georgian: ზურაბ ნასარაია) (born 19 October 1973) is a Georgian politician who currently serves as the Governor of Guria.

== Political career ==
In 1999 Zurab Nasaraia began his political career in Poti local council becoming a Member of Parliament in 2002 serving on both the Committee on Tax Revenue, Finance & Budget as well as the Interim Corruption Investigation Commission. In 2004 he left politics getting jobs in the Georgian Railways and reentered politics again on 30 August 2018 as Governor of the Guria region of Georgia.

== See also ==
- List of Georgians
- Cabinet of Georgia
