= Supsa (river) =

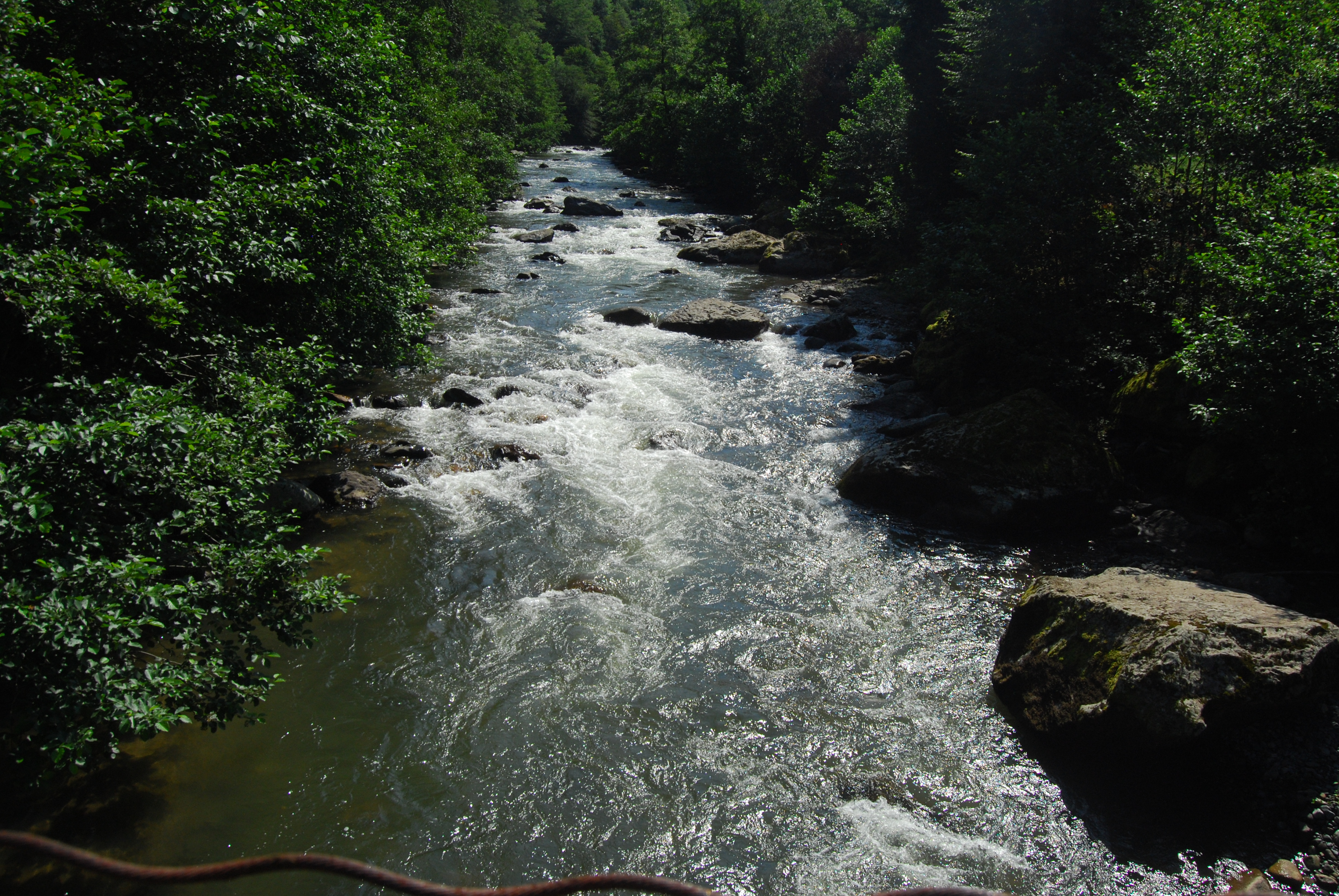
- Supsa River in the mountains near Surebi

- The Supsa river in western Georgia
- Native name: სუფსა (Georgian)

Location
- Country: Georgia
- Region: Guria

Physical characteristics
- Mouth: Black Sea
  - coordinates: 42.0192°N 41.7526°E
- Length: 108 km (67 mi)
- Basin size: 1,130 km^{2} (440 sq mi)

Basin features
- Tributaries
  - left: Bakhvistsqali

The Supsa (Georgian: სუფსა) is a river in the Black Sea basin of Georgia. It has a basin of 1,130 square kilometres (440 sq mi) and flows roughly west for 108 kilometres (67 mi) until it joins the Black Sea near the village Supsa.

The Supsa corresponds to the ancient River Mogrus (or Nogrus), described by Pliny the Elder in his Naturalis Historia.
