= Chokhatauri Municipality =

Coordinates: 42°01′03″N 42°15′20″E

Chokatauri Municipality ჩოხატაურის მუნიციპალიტეტი
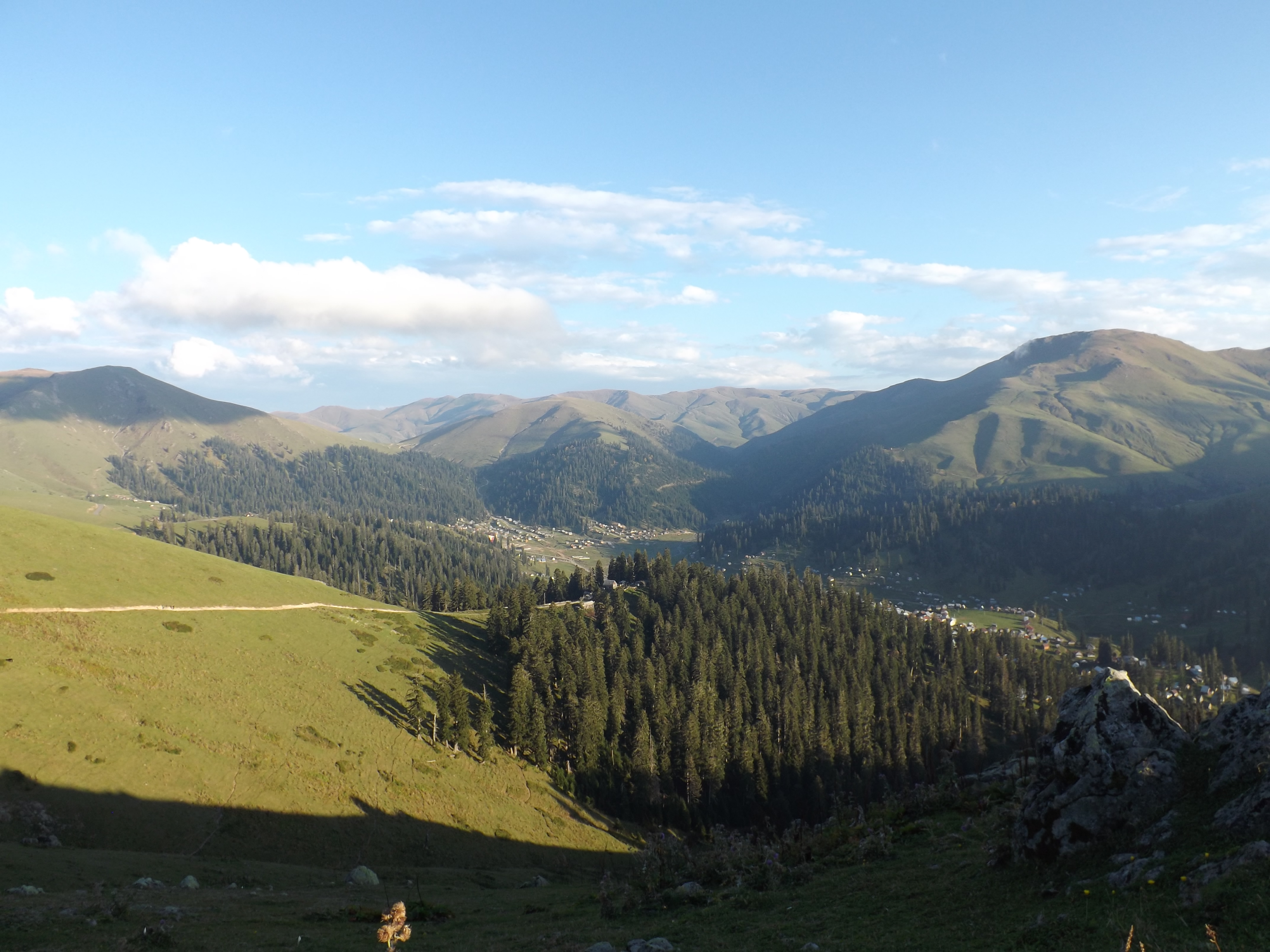
- Chokatauri Municipality

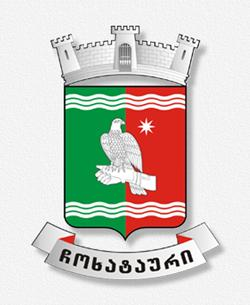
- Flag Seal

- Country: Georgia
- Mkhare: Guria
- Administrative centre: Chokhatauri

Government
  - mayor: Davit Sharashidze (GD)

Area
  - Total: 825.1 km^{2} (318.6 sq mi)

Population (2014)
  - Total: 19,001
- Time zone: UTC+4 (Georgian Time)
- Website: http://chokhatauri.ge/

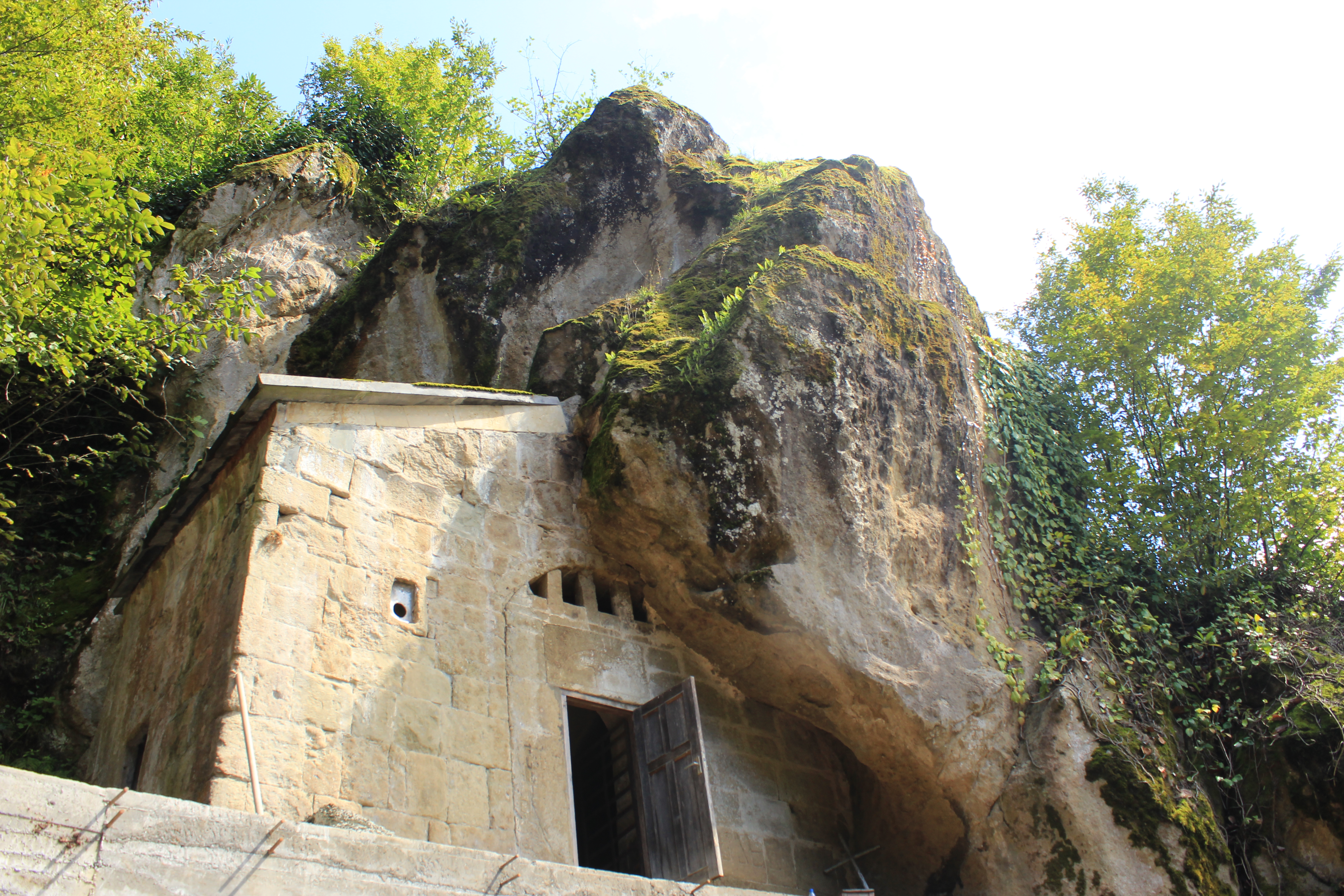
Udabno Monastery

Chokhatauri (Georgian: ჩოხატაურის მუნიციპალიტეტი) is a district of Georgia, in the region of Guria. Its largest city and administrative centre is Chokhatauri.

== Population ==
The population of the municipality is 19 001 people (2014); Density - 23.03 people / sq. km. Georgians live there. The majority of the population is Gurians, as well as Adjarans. A large part of the population is Orthodox Christian, a certain part - Muslim. There are 62 settlements in the municipality: 1 small town and 61 villages.

== Politics ==
Chokhatauri Municipal Assembly (Georgian: ჩოხატაურის საკრებულო, Chokhatauris Sakrebulo) is a representative body in Chokhatauri Municipality consisting of 36 members which are elected every four years. The last election was held in October 2021. Davit Sharashidze of Georgian Dream was elected mayor.

| Party | 2017 | 2021 | Current Municipal Assembly |
|---|---|---|---|
| Georgian Dream | 30 | 26 | |
| United National Movement | 1 | 6 | |
| For Georgia | | 3 | |
| People's Party | | 1 | |
| European Georgia | 2 | | |
| Alliance of Patriots | 2 | | |
| Development Movement | 1 | | |
| Independent | 2 | | |
| Total | 38 | 36 | |

Chokhatauri Municipality includes the following territorial units: Chokhatauri, Amagleba, Bukistsikhe, Gogolesubani, Goraberezhouli, Guturi, Dablatsikhe, Didi Vani, Erketi, Zomleti, Zemo Surebi, Zemokheti, Zoti, Kokhnari, Nabetshabi, Nabetshabi Surebi, Jvartskha, Khevi, Khidistavi.

== Economy ==
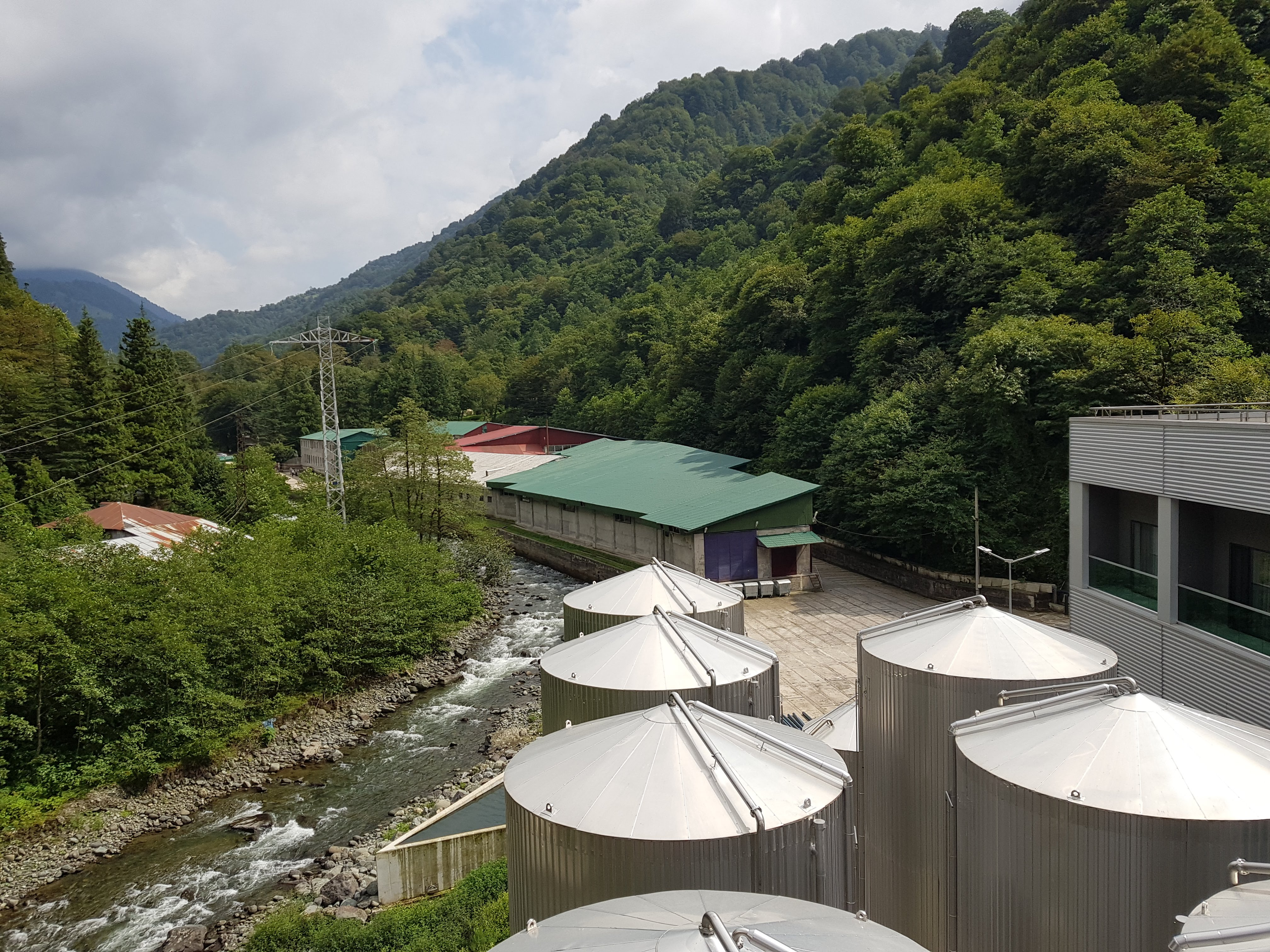
Factory of Nabeghlavi mineral water

Leading fields are agriculture, including fruit growing, grain farming, viticulture, animal husbandry. JSC Margebeli JSC (Nabeghlavi Mineral Water Bottling Plant) is an important enterprise in the municipality, with Bakhmaro and Nabeghlavi mountain-climatic resorts. The municipality is 296 km away from the capital, 24 km away from Ozurgeti, and 25 km away from the nearest railway junction. Samtredia-Kobuleti - 25 km section passes through the territory of the municipality.

== Education and Culture ==
There are 31 public and 1 private school in the municipality, art (music, art) schools, student-youth house, libraries and museums: Niko Berdzenishvili Local Lore, Niko Mari, Mose Gogiberidze, Nodar Dumbadze, Eristavi Palace.

== Tourist attractions ==
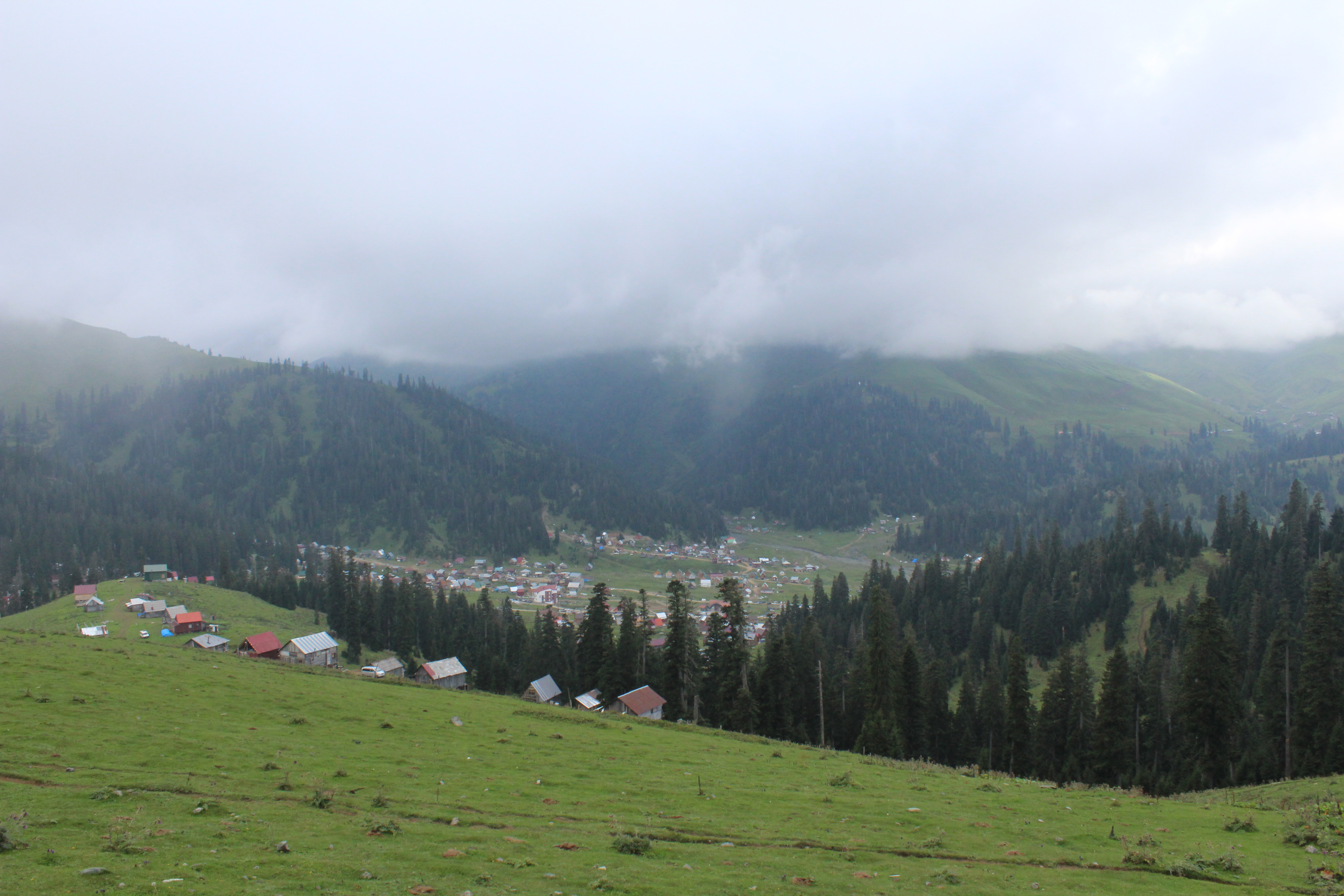
Bakhmaro resort

- Tamar Castle (Bukistsikhe)
- Erketi Convent (Erketi)
- Eristavi Palace (Goraberezhouli)
- Desert Monastery (middle elevation)
- Ghomi Castle (Zoti)
- St. George Church in Shuban

== Villages in the district ==
Villages in the Chokhatauri district include:

- Bukistsikhe
- Chaisubani
- Chokhatauri
- Dablatsikhe
- Didivani
- Erketi
- Ganakhleba
- Gogolesubani
- Goraberezhouli
- Guturi
- Khevi
- Khidistavi
- Kokhnari
- Kvenobani
- Nabeghlavi
- Partskhma
- Sachamiaseri
- Shuaganakhleba
- Shuasurebi
- Vazimleti
- Zemokheti
- Zemosurebi
- Zoti
- Janeuli

== See also ==
- List of municipalities in Georgia (country)
