= Merab Chanukvadze =

Georgian politician

Merab Chanukvadze მერაბ ჭანუყვაძე

Governor of Guria
- In office 2017 – 19 August 2018
- President: Giorgi Margvelashvili
- Preceded by: Gia Salukvadze
- Succeeded by: Zurab Nasaraia

Personal details
- Born: November 17, 1982 (age 43) Ozurgeti, Georgia.

Merab Chanukvadze (Georgian: მერაბ ჭანუყვაძე) (born 17 November 1982) is a Georgian politician who served as the Governor of Guria between 2017 and 2018.

== Political career ==
Merab Chanukvadze entered politics in 2013 becoming the Deputy Governor of Guria. In August 2014 he became the Head of Ozurgeti District Administration.

== See also ==
- List of Georgians
- Cabinet of Georgia
