= Bakhmaro =

Bakhmaro ბახმარო
- Village
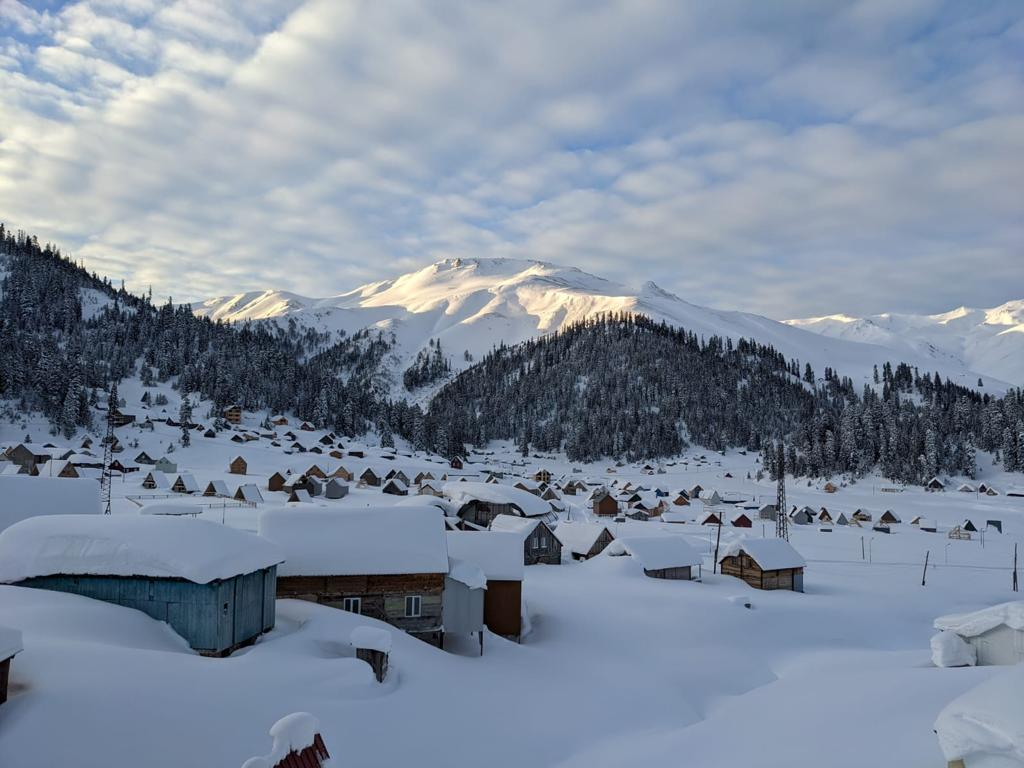

- Location within Georgia Location within Guria
- Coordinates: 41°51′06″N 42°19′32″E
- Country: Georgia
- Mkhare: Guria
- Municipality: Chokhatauri
- Elevation: 2,050 m (6,730 ft)

Population (2014)
  - Total: 0
- Time zone: UTC+4 (Georgian Time)

Bakhmaro (Georgian: ბახმარო) is a village and mountain resort in the Chokhatauri Municipality of Guria in western Georgia. It lies on the Bakhvistsqali river. Bakhmaro is a mountain climate resort.

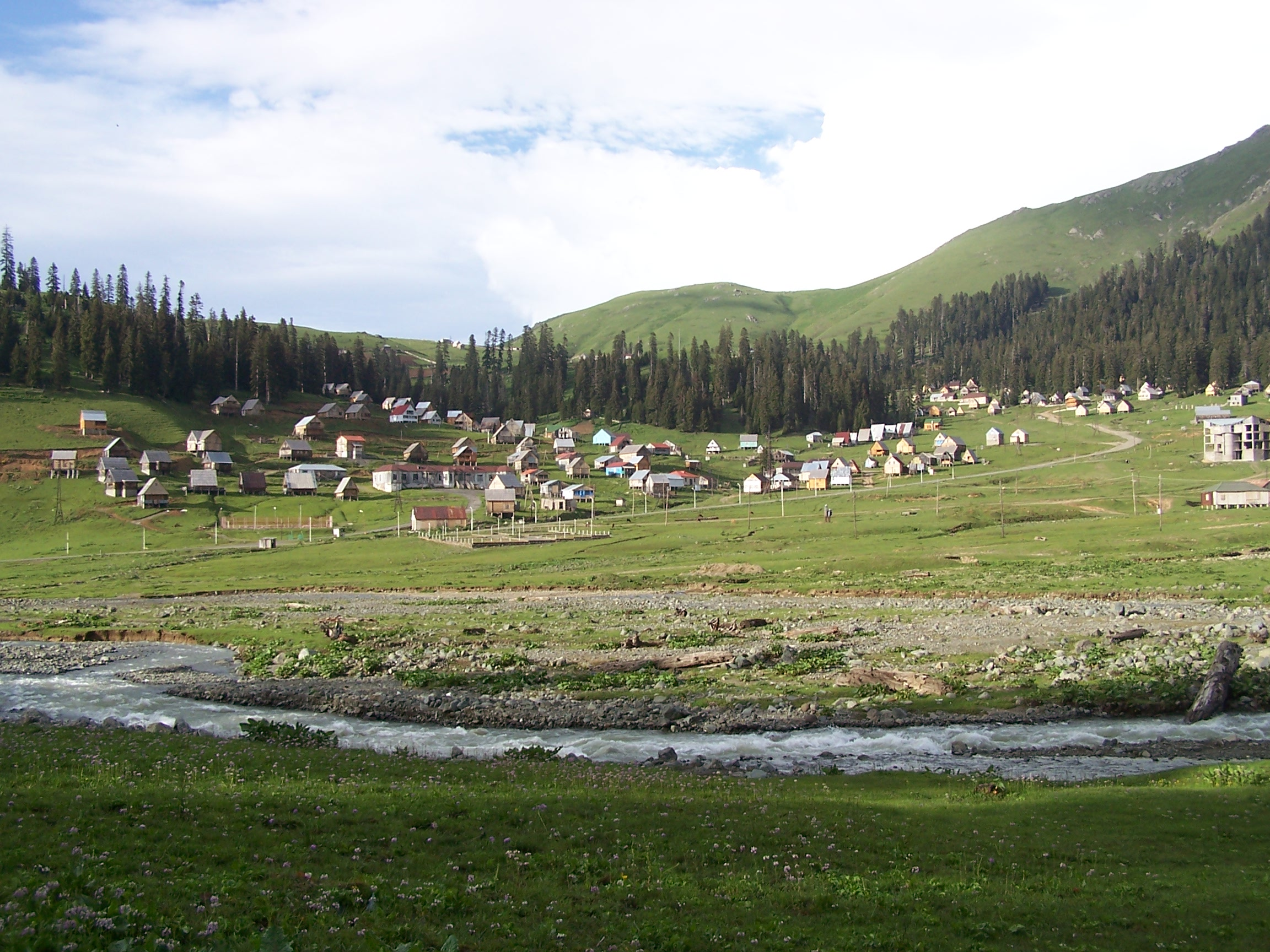
Bakhmaro recreation area in June 2009

There are several ways to go to Bakhmaro. One of them is from the village of Mtispiri and is 28 kilometer long path. In this case you would leave your car in the village. It is also possible to go to Bakhmaro by horse or foot path from Khidistavi (29 km) and from Vekhijvari (27 km). Bakhmaro is a mountain climate resort.

Unlike Gomismta, which is located on the edge of a mountain, Bakhmaro is nestled in a valley. It is located at 1950 meters above the sea level and surrounded by high mountains covered in spruce forest. The surrounding mountatins vary in height, from 2300 to 2700 meters above sea level. Bakhmaro is unique in that air from the sea rises and mixes with the mountain air.

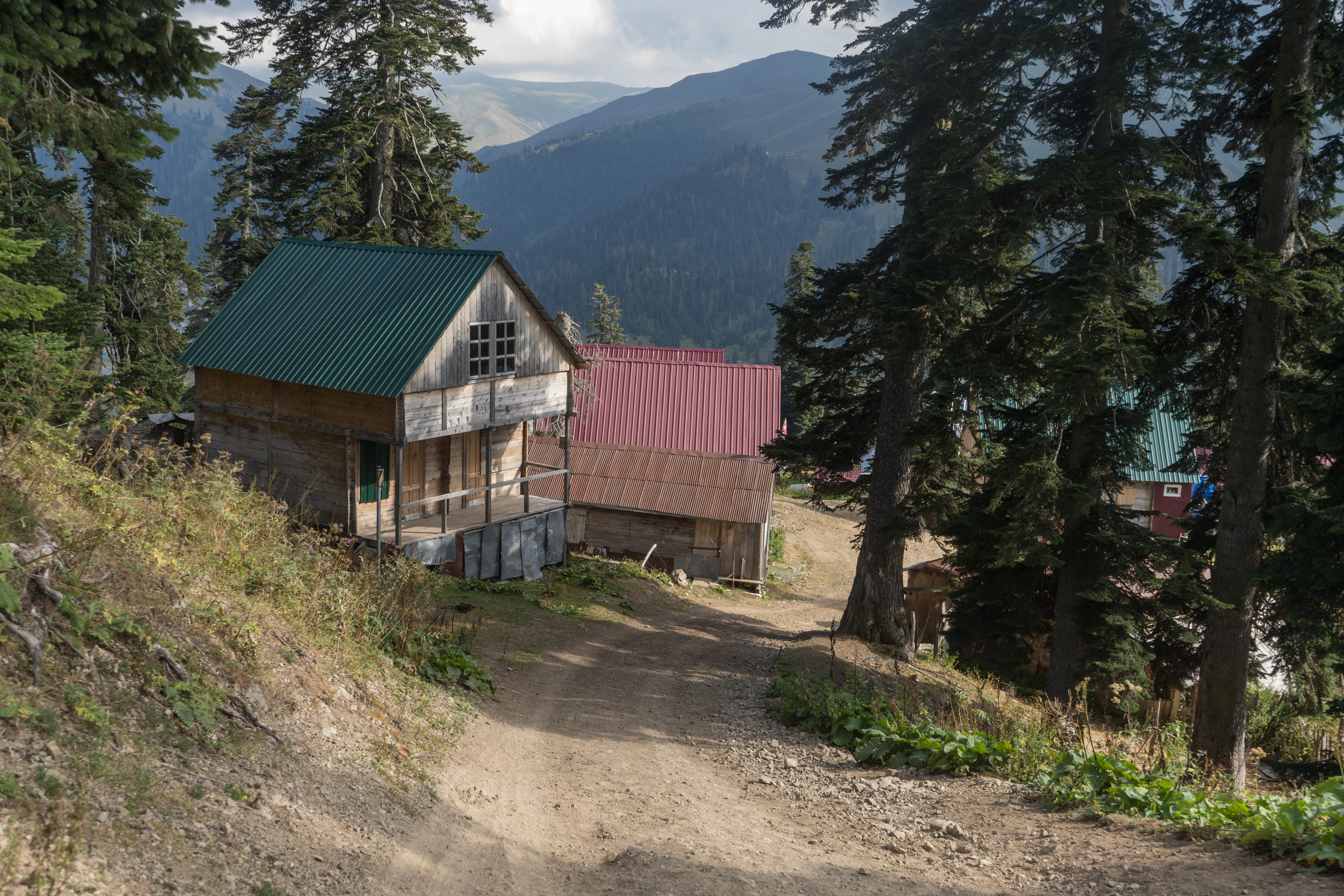
Wooden houses of Bakhmaro

Bakhmaro has historically been is recommended as a resort to treat people with respiratory ailments, tuberculosis, hemorrhage, and neurasthenia. Locals believe that it takes 21 days in Bakhmaro Resort for a person to feel full therapeutic effects. Bakhmaro has health benefits from June to October, and has been discussed as a potential winter resort since 1932. The Government of Georgia has a proposal to turn Bakhmaro into a four-season resort. Currently, the holiday season of Bakhmaro still remains about one month and a half, as it was 150 years ago.
