= Bakhvistsqali =

- Bakhvistsqali near Tskhavata Mountain.
- Native name: ბახვისწყალი (Georgian)

Location
- Country: Georgia

Physical characteristics
- Mouth: Supsa
  - coordinates: 41°59′23″N 42°03′48″E
- Length: 42 km (26 mi)

Basin features
- Progression: Supsa→ Black Sea

The Bakhvistsqali (Georgian: ბახვისწყალი) is a river in western Georgia, located in the region of Guria. It flows into the Supsa and has a length of 42 kilometres.
