= Nabeghlavi =

Georgian bottled water brand

Nabeghlavi ნაბეღლავი
- English Version Logo

- Plastic bottle with Georgian label
- Country: Georgia
- Produced by: JSC "Healthy Water"
- Introduced: 1958; 68 years ago
- Source: Nabeghlavi, Guria
- Calcium (Ca): 32–116 mg/dm^{3}
- Chloride (Cl): 37–95 mg/dm^{3}
- Magnesium (Mg): 34–120 mg/dm^{3}
- Potassium (K): 690–1270 mg/dm^{3}
- Sodium (Na): 690–1270 mg/dm^{3}
- Website: nabeghlavi.ge
- All concentrations in milligrams per liter (mg/L); pH without units

Nabeghlavi (Georgian: ნაბეღლავი; also written Nabeglavi) is a mineral water from the village of the same name in Guria, Georgia.

It's produced by the Georgian-Swiss joint stock company JSC "Healthy Water". The company was founded in 1997 and nowadays is the leader of the Georgian mineral water market, primarily due to Nabeghlavi, which they started bottling to "restore long time tradition".

Bottling was initiated in 1958, following the establishment of a health resort in the village of Nabeghlavi, which in turn was determined by revealing the water's "unique curative properties". At the time however, water production was small and the distribution area rather limited, until JSC Healthy Water obtained license and took over, with quality and popularity increasing afterwards.

There is also a Nabeghlavi Museum.

== Product ==
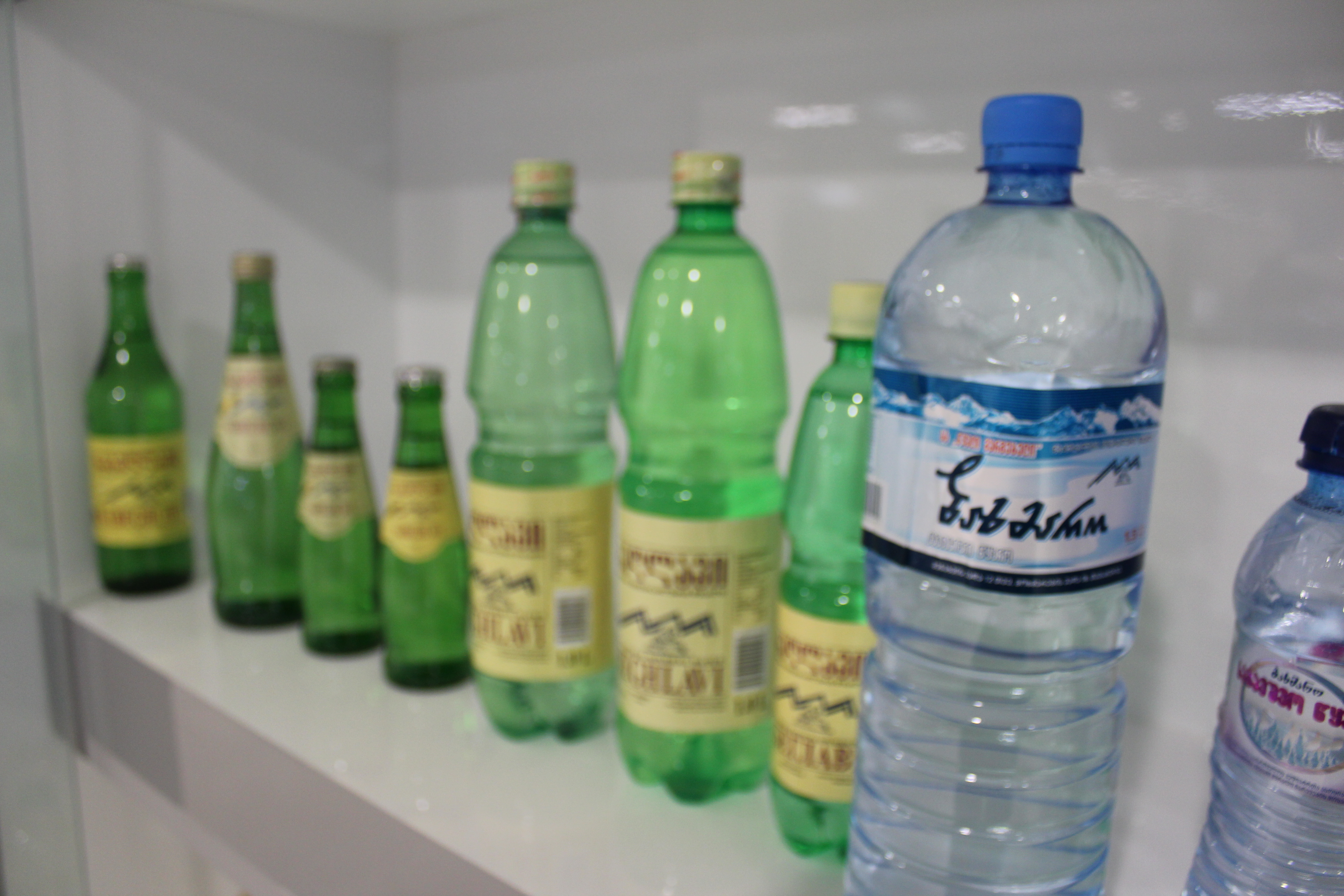
Different versions of Nabeghlavi in a museum

The source of the mineral water is located in the village Nabeghlavi, hence the name of the water.

The source was discovered in 1905. According to an old story, local inhabitants of the region noticed that buffalos were especially attracted to one of the water sources; the very same source later turned out to have special taste and curative properties.

Fundamental exploration of the mineral water deposit was conducted during the first half of the 20th century by famous Georgian and foreign researchers.

Initial study of the chemical composition of the water was performed in 1921 by Latvian scientist Roberts Kupcis, who spent most of his life in Georgia. Later hydro-geological research was led by famous Georgian and foreign scientists during the 1930s.

Within this period, chemical properties of the water were scientifically developed and the water was stated to have bicarbonate calcium-sodium composition as well as carbon dioxide.

=== Attributes ===
Nabeghlavi water is formed at a depth of 2000–3000 meters. The infiltrated waters travel through various layers of substrate and rocks, absorb specific combination of minerals and trace elements that define its unique taste and beneficial properties. Nabeghlavi water is naturally sparkling as it is infused with natural carbon dioxide (CO_{2}) at the aquifer; though it is fortified with additional amount of natural CO_{2} prior to bottling.

==== Chemical composition ====
Total dissolved solids 3.5 – 5.9 g/l

- Cations mg/l
- Ca^{2+} 32-116
- Mg^{2+} 34-120
- Na^{+} + K^{+} 690-1270
- Anions mg/l
- HCO_{3}^{−} 2400-4400
- Cl^{-} 37-95
- SO_{4}^{2−} 53-244
- Specific components mg/l
- H_{2}SiO_{3} 55-90
- H_{3}BO_{3} > 35

== Distribution ==
Outside of Georgia, the product has been distributed in the former Soviet Union and Georgian diaspora worldwide.

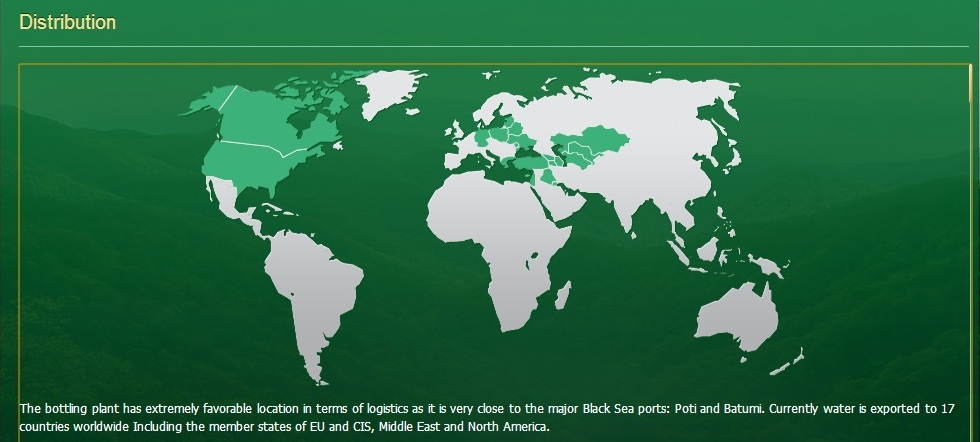
Nabeghlavi Distribution around the World (2013)

== Gallery ==
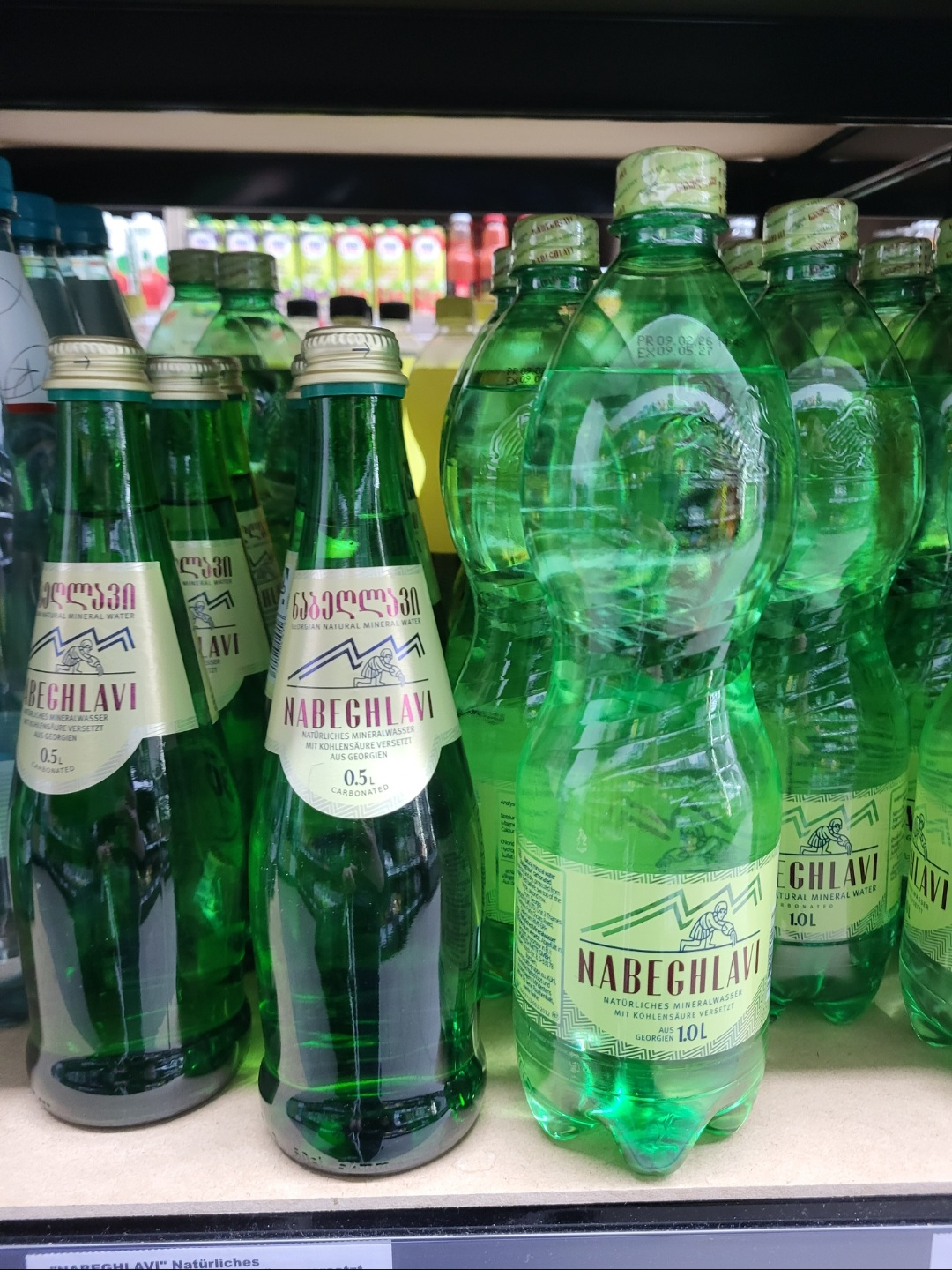
Bottled Nabeghlavi varieties

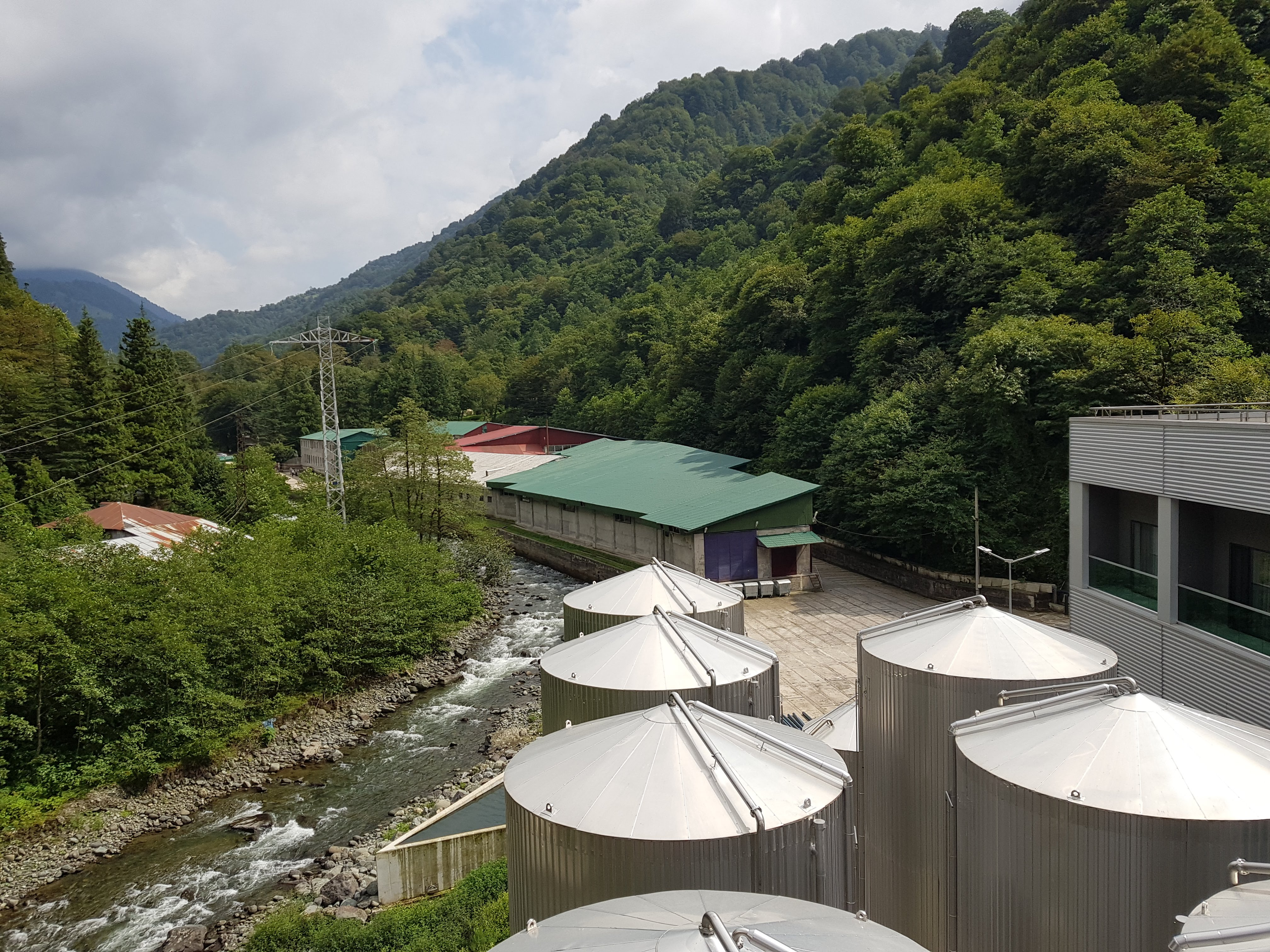
Nabeghlavi factories

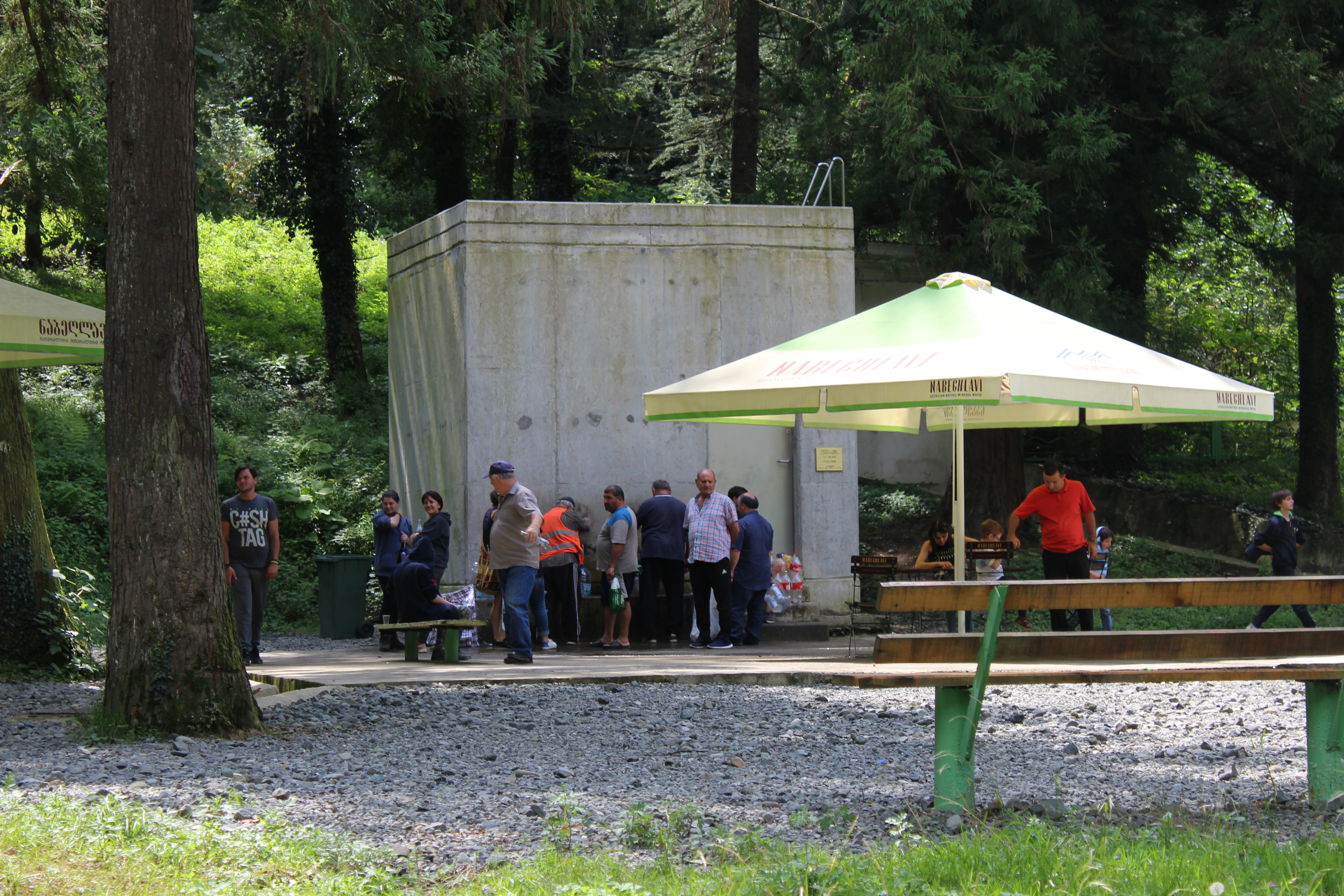
Water spring in Nabeghlavi

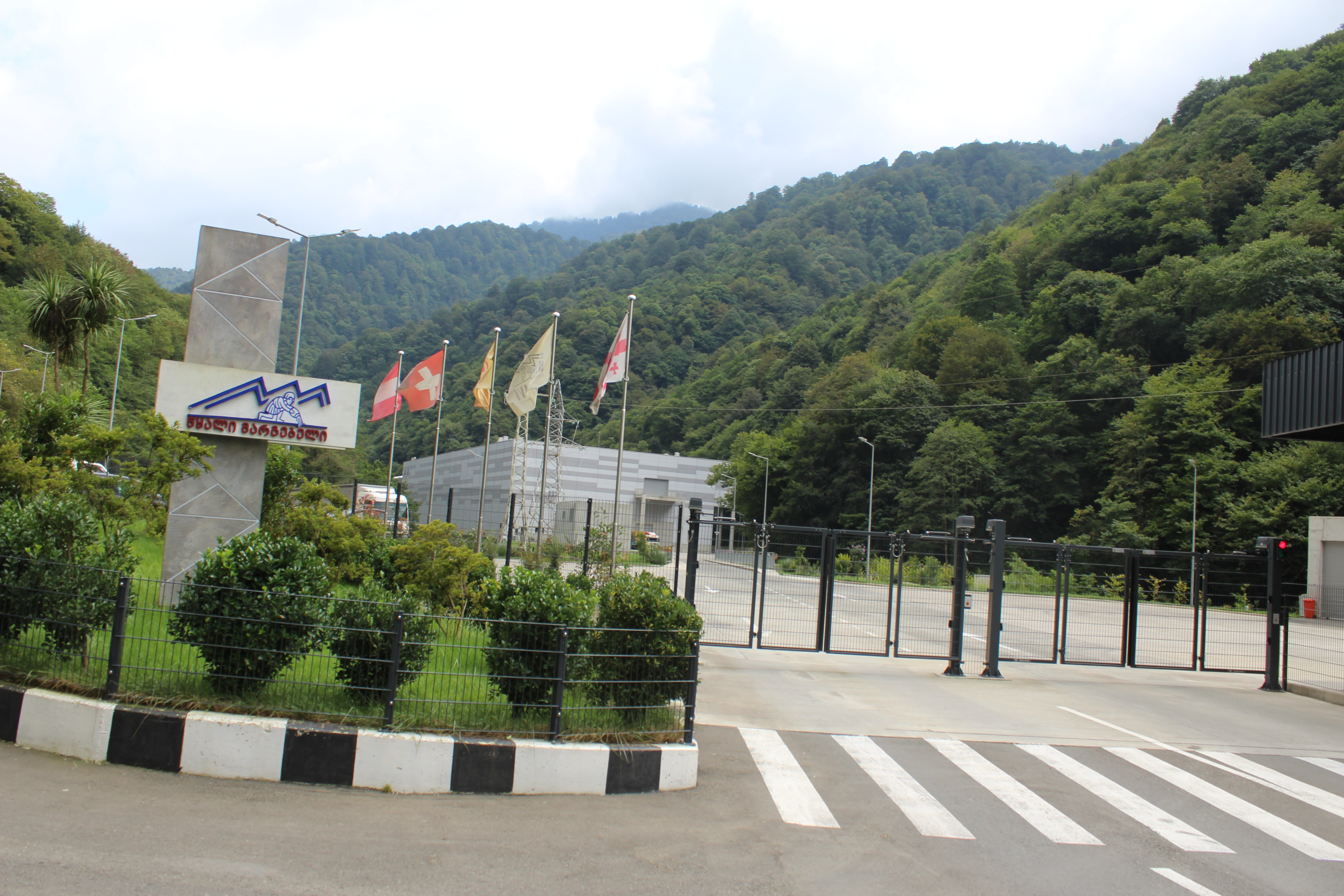
HQ of JSC Healthy Water

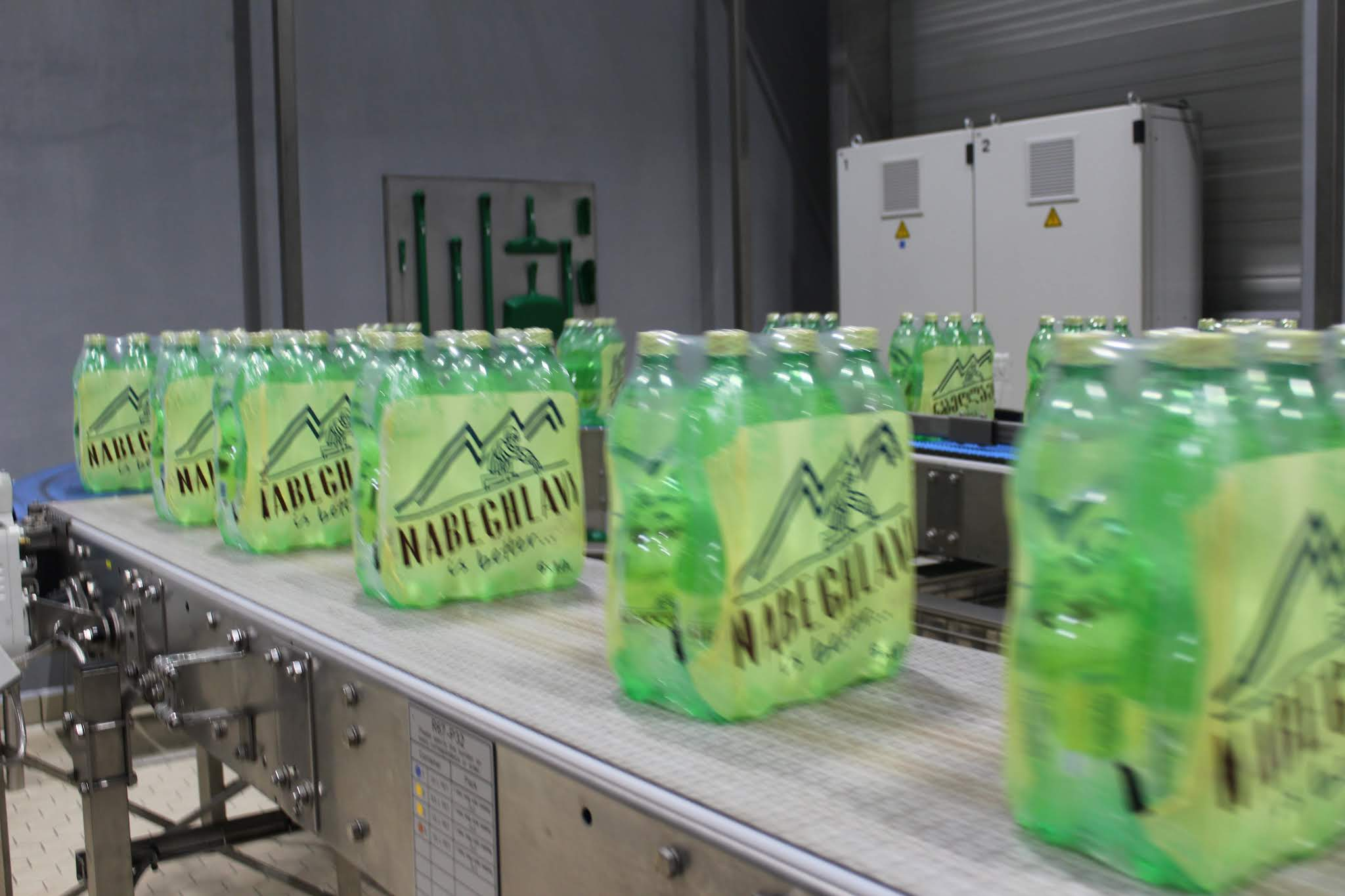
Nabeghlavi production

== See also ==
- Borjomi (water)
- Lagidze water
