= Guria =

Region (mkhare) of Georgia

Coordinates: 41°58′N 42°12′E

Guria გურია
- Mkhare (region)
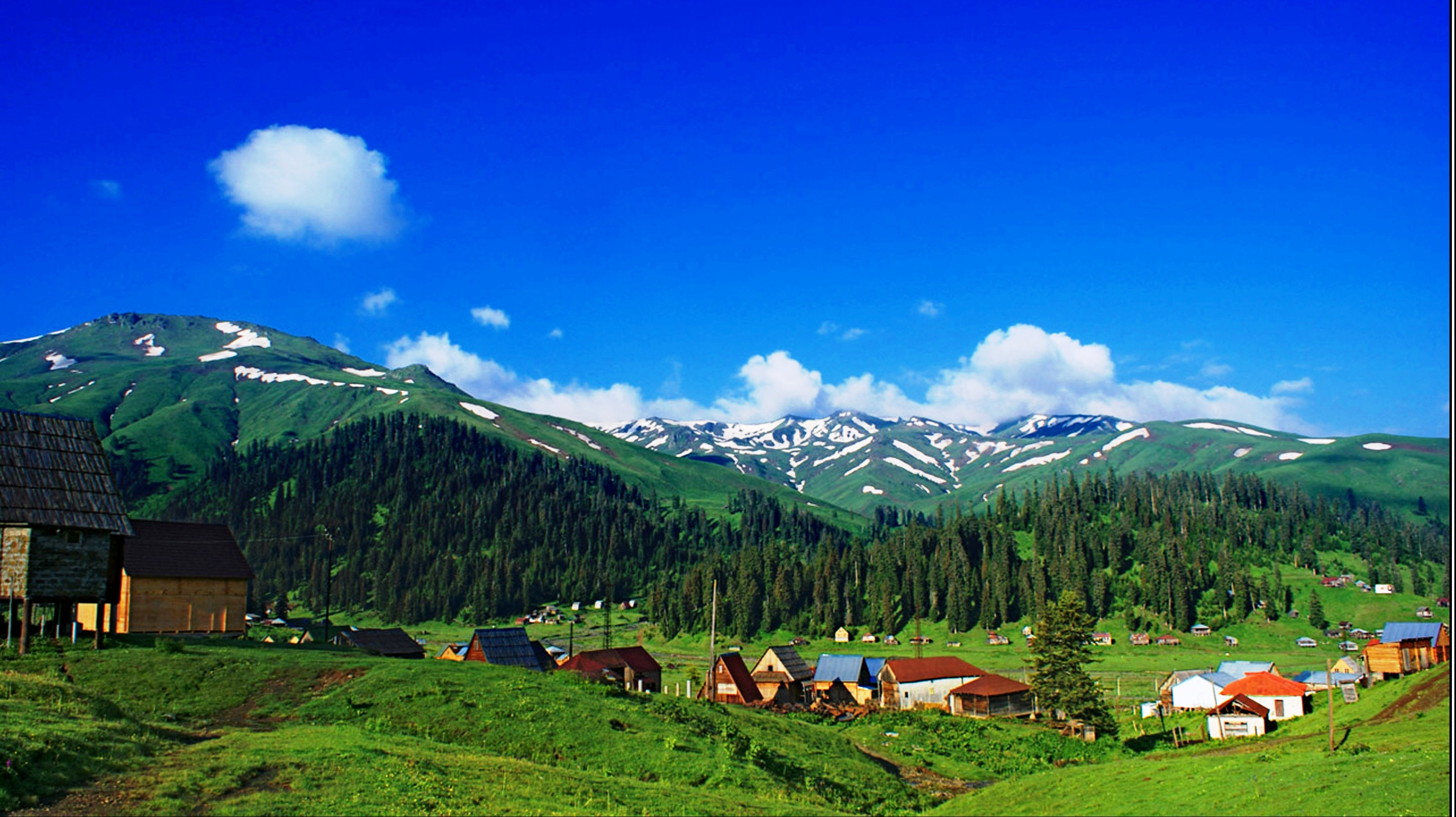
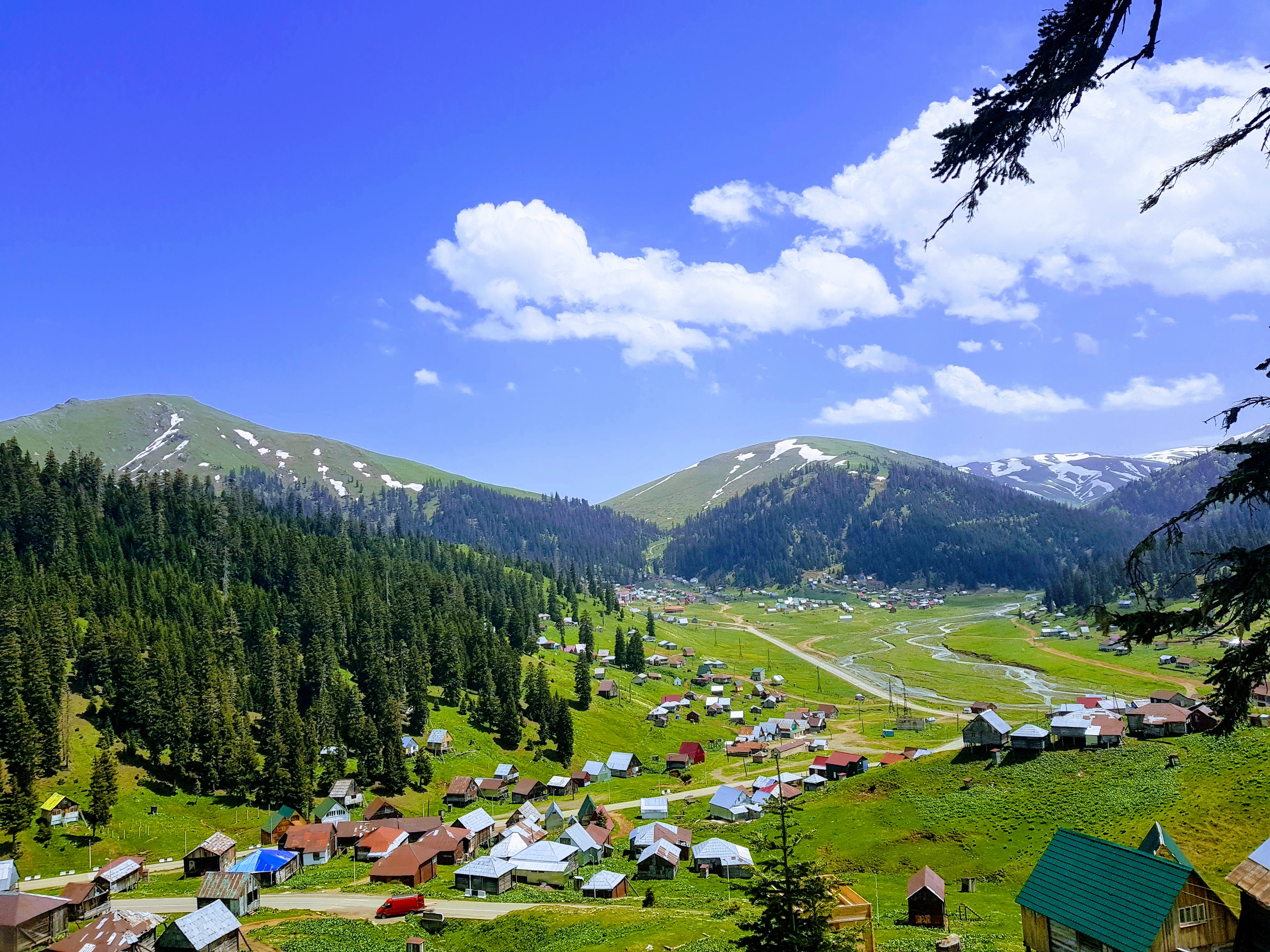
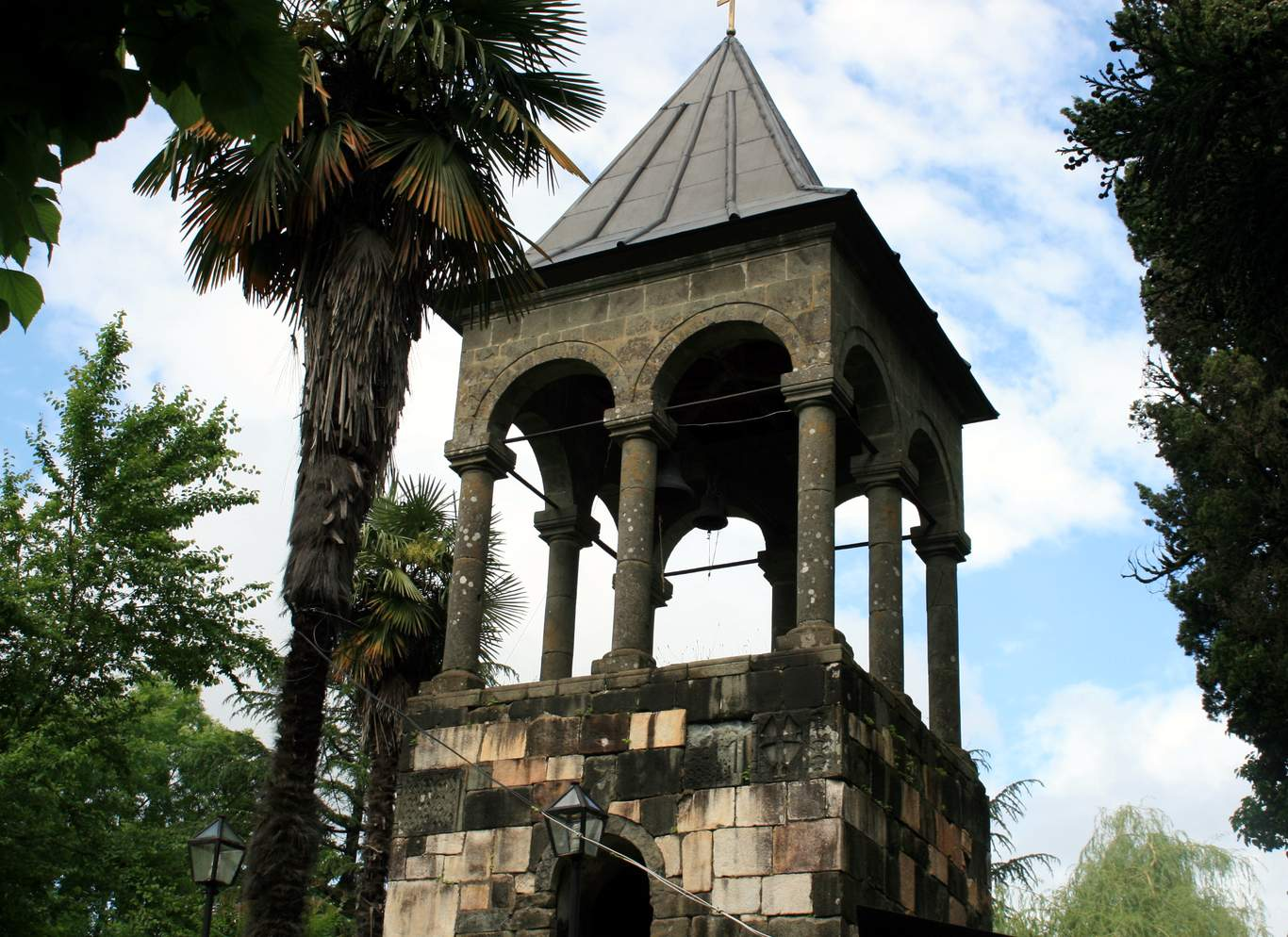
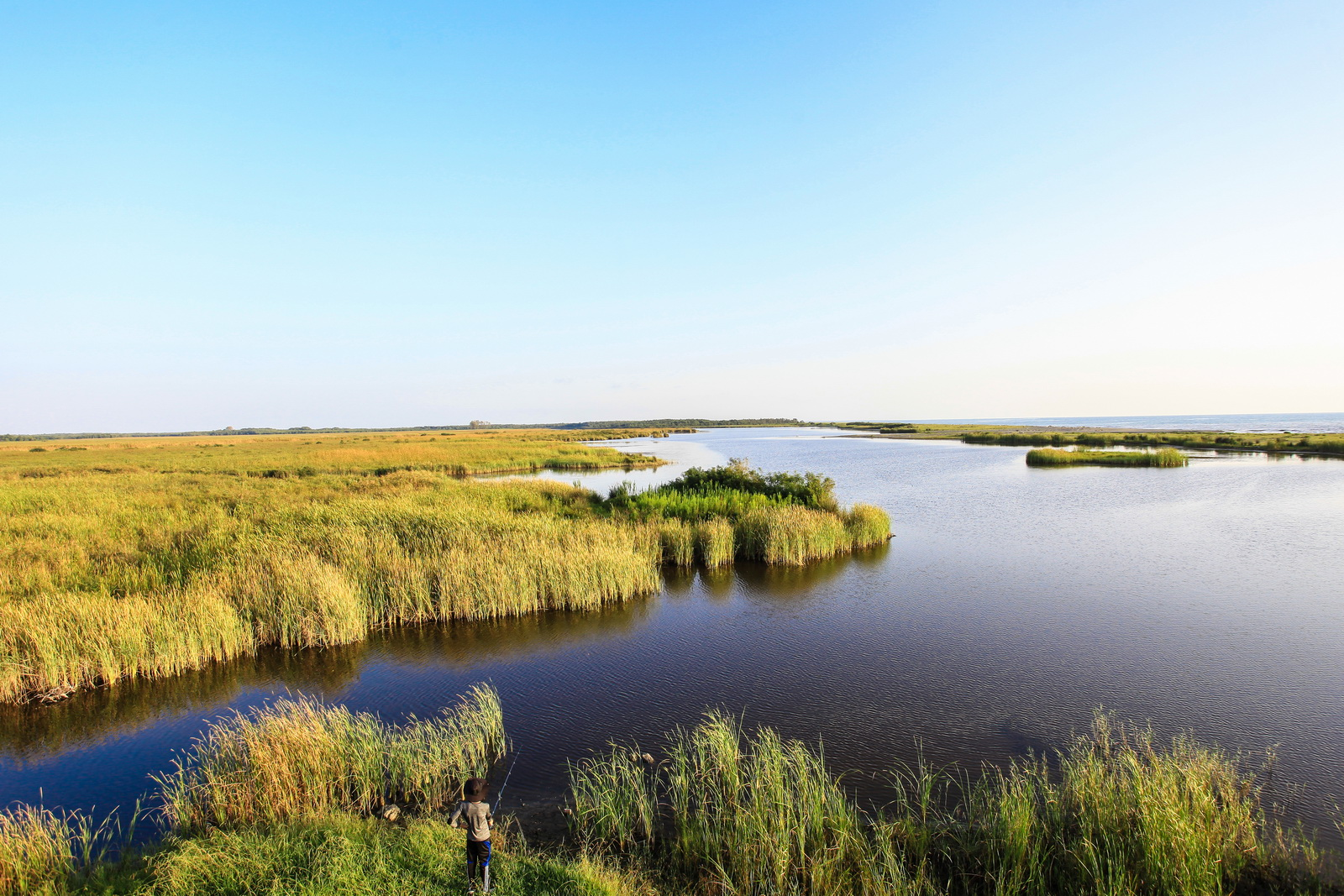
- From the top to bottom-right: Landscape of Guria, Bakhmaro, Shemokmedi Monastery, Kolkheti National Park, Bakhvistsqali River

- Country: Georgia
- Main City: Ozurgeti
- Municipalities: 3

Government
  - Governor: Zurab Nasaraia

Area
  - Total: 2,033 km^{2} (785 sq mi)

Population (2023)
  - Total: 104,338
  - Density: 51.32/km^{2} (132.9/sq mi)

GDP (nominal, 2022)
  - Total: ₾ 1.04 billion (€340 million)
  - Per Capita: ₾ 9,934 (€3,260)
- ISO 3166 code: GE-GU
- HDI (2023): 0.800 high · 9th

Guria (Georgian: გურია) is a region (mkhare) in Georgia, in the western part of the country, bordered by the eastern end of the Black Sea. The region has a population of 104,338 (2023), with Ozurgeti as the regional capital.

== Geography ==
Guria is bordered by Samegrelo to the north-west, Imereti to the north, Samtskhe-Javakheti to the east, Adjara to the south, and the Black Sea to the west. The province has an area of 2,033 km^{2} (785 sq mi).

Guria is traversed by the northeasterly line of equal latitude and longitude.

== Administrative divisions ==
Relief map of Guria

Subdivision of Guria

Guria is divided into 4 entities (3 municipalities and 1 city), including:

- City of Ozurgeti
- Ozurgeti Municipality
- Lanchkhuti Municipality
- Chokhatauri Municipality

== History ==
Coat of arms of the Principality of Guria

The territory that is now Guria was part of the kingdom of Colchis, best known in the West for the tale of the Golden Fleece. Following the collapse of the Colchian Kingdom it became part of the Kingdom of Lazica in the first century BC. In antiquity the area was a significant source of iron, as early as the fifth century BC, and also copper and gold. The toponym "Guria" is first attested in the c. 800 Georgian chronicle of Pseudo-Juansher.

Historical Guria in modern international borders of Georgia

Guria first appeared in historical records around 1352 as a fief of the house of Vardanidze-Dadiani; after 1463 it became a sovereign principality independent of the Kingdom of Georgia under a branch of that house, known thereafter by the name of Gurieli. The principality, comprising modern Guria and much of Adjara with the city of Batumi, was subsequently reduced in size and devastated in a series of conflicts with the Ottoman Empire. A Russian protectorate was established by the treaty concluded on June 19, 1810 between Mamia V Gurieli and the empire, and in 1829, during the regency of the last prince, the Gurieli David, the principality was annexed by Russia.

There were uprisings against Russian rule in 1819 and again in 1841. In 1840, Guria was made a county (uyezd) and renamed Ozurgeti, after one of its main towns. In 1846, it was transferred to the new Kutais Governorate. By 1904, the population was just under 100,000, occupying an area of approximately 532,000 acres (2,150 km^{2}) of mountains and swampy valleys, covered by corn fields, vineyards, and some tea plantations. It was the most ethnically homogenous of Georgian areas, with the peasantry and lesser rural nobility making up almost the entire population, with a high level of literacy and a relatively high degree of economic self-sufficiency. The peasant protest movement, which originated in 1902 and culminated in an open insurrection against the government during the Russian Revolution of 1905, was the most effective and organized peasant movement in the empire. The peasants’ self-government, the so-called Gurian Republic, survived into 1906, when it was crushed and Guria devastated by the Cossack punitive expedition. The region was a native powerbase of the Georgian Social Democratic (Menshevik) Party which dominated the Democratic Republic of Georgia from 1918 to 1921. Guria was a scene of guerrilla resistance to the militarily imposed Soviet rule early in the 1920s. Under the Soviet government, Guria was an agrarian area divided into three administrative districts. In 1995, the Georgian government decreed the creation of the region (mkhare) of Guria, restoring the province's historical name to official usage.

The Orthodox churches of Likhauri and Shemokmedi are the main historical buildings in the province.

== Etymology ==
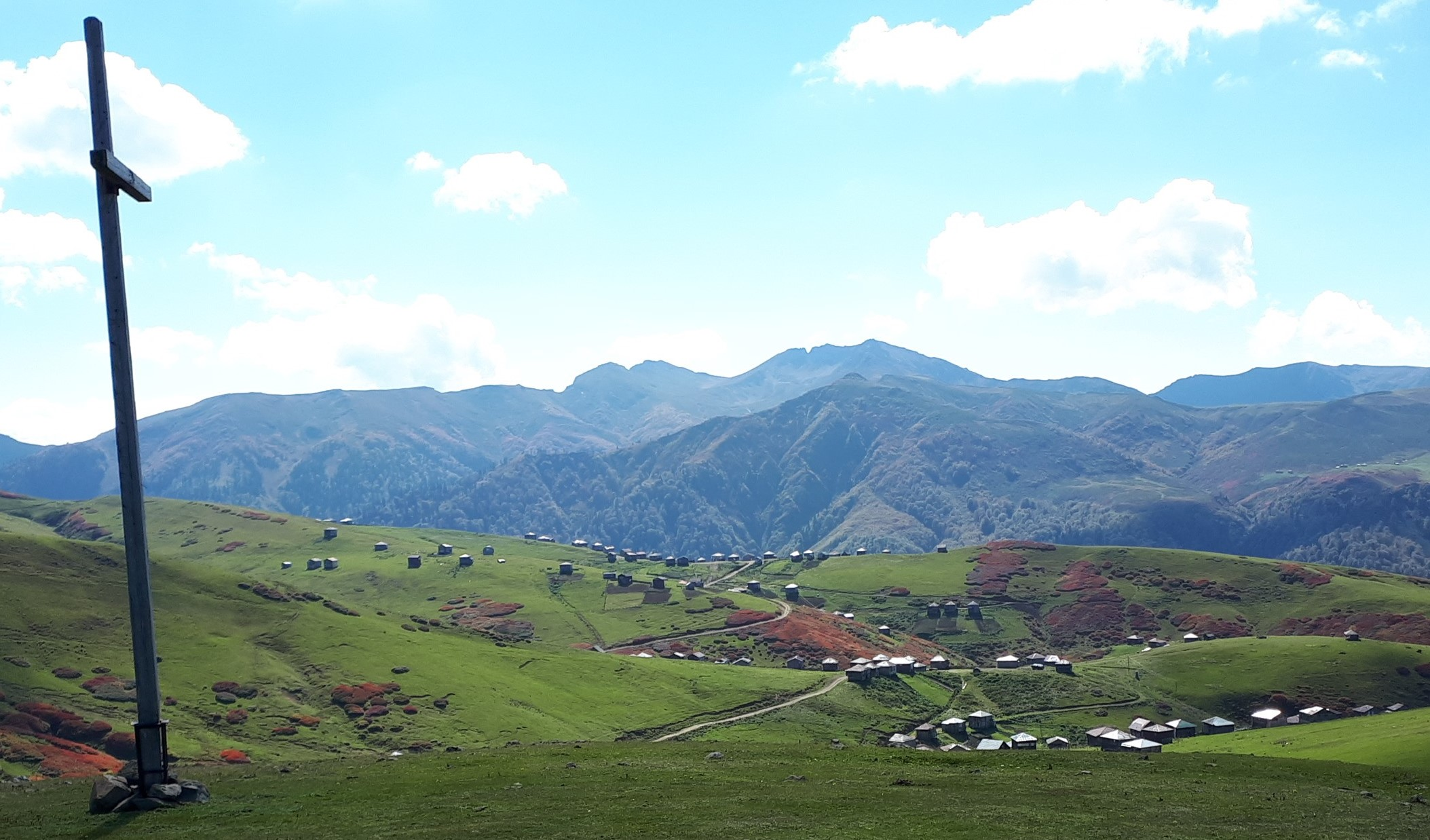
Gomismta and the Lesser Caucasus mountains (Guria region)

Some say that the root of the word [Guria] refers to restlessness and the word should mean “the land of the restless” and is associated with events during the eighth and ninth centuries when “Leon became the King of Abkhazeti. Guruls (governor of Guria) refused to obey the ruler of Odzrakho, ceased their vassal relations with Adarnase and Ashot Bagrationi and united with Leon” as it was described in Vakhushti Bagrationi’s historical works of the eighteenth century.

According to a later explanation, in the times of Georgia’s prosperity, when its borders stretched from "Nikopsia to Daruband", Guria was situated in the heart of the Georgian territory.

The linguistic evidence for the above hypothesis is the Megrelian word for “heart” – “guri” (Georgian: “guli”).

== Economy ==
Subtropic farming and tourism are a mainstay of the region's economy. Water is one of Guria's main assets. The province is famous for the mineral water of Nabeglavi, which is similar to Borjomi in its chemical composition, and the Black Sea health resort of Ureki, which is rich in magnetic sand. Guria is also one of the largest tea growing regions in Georgia.

== Demographics ==
=== Ethnic and religious groups ===
According to the 2014 census, Guria has a population of 113.350 inhabitants, which accounts for 3.1% of the total population of Georgia. 98% of the population is ethnic Georgian (mostly native Gurians), 1% is ethnic Armenian and the remaining 1% is composed of Russians and Ukrainians and the majority of the population is Orthodox Christians (87%), followed by Islam (11%).

=== Gurians ===
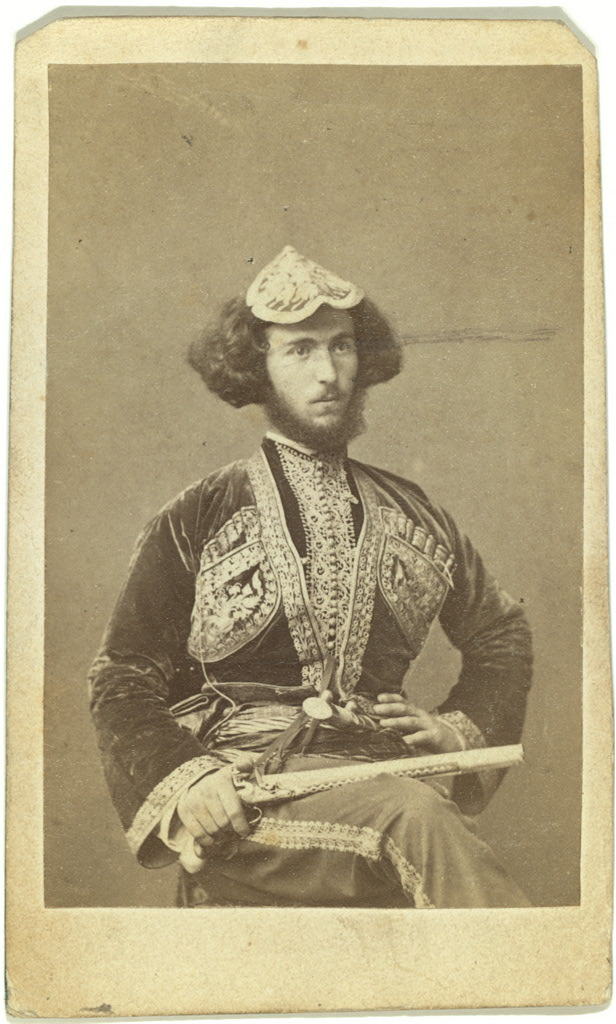
A Gurian man.

The Gurians or Gurulebi (Georgian: გურულები) is one of the ethnographical groups of Georgians, inhabiting Guria. Gurians are Orthodox Christian and speak the Gurian dialect of the Georgian language.

== Politics ==
=== Administration ===
The administration centre is Ozurgeti. There are 194 populated areas, including:

- City: 2 (Ozurgeti, Lanchkhuti)
- Daba: 7 (Chokhatauri, Bakhmaro, Gomismta, Ureki, Naruja, Laituri, Kveda Nasakirali)
- Villages: 185

=== Governors ===
To date, the following politicians have held the office of Governor of Guria:

- 1995-1997 - Mikheil Chkuaseli
- 1997-1998 - Oleg Nikoleishvili
- 1998–2003 - Carlo Gujabidze
- 2003-2004 - Vakhtang Goliadze
- 2004-2005 - Bezhan Kalandadze
- 2005-2006 - Aleko Tsintsadze
- 2006-2008 - Mikheil Svimonishvili
- 2008-2008 - Ramaz Nikolaishvili
- 2008–2013 - Valeri Chitaishvili
- 2013–2014 - Giorgi Chkhaidze
- 2015-2017 - Gia Salukvadze
- 2017-2018 - Merab Chanukvadze
- 2018–2021 - Zurab Nasaraia
- 2021–2021 - Giorgi Sakhokia
- 2021–2025 - Giorgi Urushadze
- 2025–Present - Giorgi Ghurjumelidze

== Notable people ==
- Ekvtime Takaishvili (1862–1953), historian
- Noe Zhordania (1868–1953), Prime Minister of the Democratic Republic of Georgia from 1918 to 1921.
- Egnate Ninoshvili (1859–1894), writer and social democratic activist.
- Boris Paichadze (1915–1990), football player
- Eduard Shevardnadze (1928–2014), Georgia's former president
- Nodar Dumbadze (1928–1984), writer

== See also ==
- Subdivisions of Georgia
