= Gurian Republic =

Peasant insurrection in Russian Georgia (1902–1906)

Gurian Republic გურიის რესპუბლიკა
- 1902–1906
- Guria, known at the time as the Ozurget Uyezd, within the Russian Empire
- Capital: Ozurgeti
- Common languages: Georgian
- Government: Republic
- President
  - 1902–1906: Beniamin Chkhikvishvili
- Historical era: Modern Era
  - Sovereignty: 1902
  - Disestablished: 1906
- Currency: Ruble
- Today part of: Georgia

The Gurian Republic (Note: Georgian: გურიის რესპუბლიკა, romanized: guriis resp'ublik'a Russian: Гурийская республика, romanized: Guriiskaya respublika) was an insurgent community that existed between 1902 and 1906 in the western Georgian region of Guria (known at the time as the Ozurget Uyezd) in the Russian Empire. It rose from a revolt over land grazing rights in 1902. Several issues over the previous decades affecting the peasant population including taxation, land ownership and economic factors also factored into the start of the insurrection. The revolt gained further traction through the efforts of Georgian social democrats, despite some reservations within their party over supporting a peasant movement, and grew further during the 1905 Russian Revolution.

During its existence, the Gurian Republic ignored Russian authority and established its own system of government, which consisted of assemblies of villagers meeting and discussing issues. A unique form of justice, where trial attendees voted on sentences, was introduced. While the movement broke from imperial administration, it was not anti-Russian, desiring to remain within the Empire.

The 1905 Russian Revolution led to massive uprisings throughout the Empire, including Georgia, and in reaction the Russian imperial authorities deployed military forces to end the rebellions, including in Guria. The organised peasants were able to fend off a small force of Cossacks, but the imperial authorities returned with overwhelming military force to re-assert control in 1906. Some of the Republic's leaders were executed, imprisoned or exiled, but others later played prominent roles in the 1918–1921 Democratic Republic of Georgia. The Republic also showed that peasants could be incorporated into the socialist movement, an idea previously downplayed by leading Marxists.

== Background ==
=== Guria within the Russian Empire ===
Guria is a historic region in western Georgia. In the early 19th century it had been incorporated into the Russian Empire: the Principality of Guria was made a protectorate in 1810 and retained autonomy until 1829 when it was formally annexed. The region was re-organised in 1840 into an uyezd (Russian: уезд; a secondary administrative division) and renamed the Ozurget Uyezd, after Ozurgeti, the main city in the region; it was added to the Kutais Governorate in 1846. Until the Russo-Turkish War and the annexation of Adjara in 1878, Guria bordered the Ottoman Empire, and that legacy as a borderland was slow to dissipate: many residents remained armed, and bandits frequented the region.

The Russian Empire's only census, in 1897, counted Guria's population at just under 100,000, while the Kutais Governorate had the second-highest population density in the Caucasus (after the Erivan Governorate). That reflected a major increase during this era, and by 1913 it had grown a further 35 per cent. Guria was overwhelmingly rural, with Ozurgeti the largest city at 4,694, and only 26 other villages listed. There were few factories, though some smaller distilleries did exist, with most of the population working in agriculture. In contrast to other parts of Georgia, especially the capital Tiflis, Guria was ethnically homogeneous, with most of the population being ethnic Georgians.

Guria had high levels of education for a poor peasant region. There were an estimated 63 schools, with 2,833 students, throughout the region by 1905. Ozurgeti alone had four, including one for girls, and 681 total students. As a result, literacy rates were high throughout the region; with one student per 20 people, the Ozurget Uyezd had by far the highest proportion of students in Georgia. This gave Guria a reputation as an educated and literate region, but there were no real opportunities for further development there, which frustrated the rural intelligentsia.

The development of the Transcaucasus Railway in 1872 had a major effect on Guria. It connected Tiflis with the port cities of Batumi and Poti, allowing passengers to easily travel across Georgia; it was possible to go from Ozurgeti to Batumi in 40 minutes. With many Gurians unable to make a living from farming land, they instead became seasonal workers, travelling to Batumi and Poti, or other developing regions across Georgia. Indeed, by 1900 most of the 12,000 workers in Batumi, which was the third-largest industrial centre in the Transcaucasus, were from Guria.

The advent of socialist ideas was also an important factor in Guria. It was noted by Grigory Aleksinsky, a Bolshevik active during the republic's existence, as "a citadel of Menshevism." Many of the leading Georgian Mensheviks, the leading faction of the Georgian Social Democrats, came from Guria; nearly 30 per cent of the Georgian delegates at the Fifth Party Congress in 1907 were from the region. Several leading Georgian Bolsheviks, the other main faction within the Russian Social Democratic Labour Party (RSDLP), were also Gurian, though the region overwhelmingly supported the Mensheviks. Many labourers who went to Batumi and Poti were exposed to socialist ideals, and participated in strikes and other labour actions led by the RSDLP; on their return to Guria they would expose the peasants to these ideas. In particular, after a strike action was broken up in Batumi in 1902, some 500 to 600 workers were forced to leave the city, with many of them going to Guria.

=== Land issues ===
Underdeveloped and poor, Guria had serious land shortages, made worse by population growth and the emancipation of the serfs. Though nominally freed from serfdom, serfs were not freed from their economic obligations, and thus many peasants in Georgia remained "temporarily obligated" to their former masters without real improvement in their lives.

The average peasant household had no more than 1.5 desyatina (roughly the same amount of hectares), with half of that land rented. In European Russia this figure was closer to 10 or 11 desyatina per household, while the authorities in Kutaisi estimated at least 4 desyatina were required for a poor family to survive. Estimates by government officials suggested that 70 percent of Gurian households could not meet these land requirements. Peasants thus farmed their own plots, but as this was not enough to survive on they rented from nobles or worked on the land as labourers. Roughly 60 percent of the peasants rented land, paying anywhere from one-sixth to one-half of the harvest in rent. Between the 1880s and 1900, Guria had seen the highest average increase in rent of anywhere in the Transcaucasus.

This was compounded by the high proportion of nobles in Georgia, where approximately 5.6 percent of the population were landowning nobles, compared to 1.4 percent in European Russia. While larger landowners were required to make land available for rent, those who owned less than 11.25 desyatina did not have to, which meant some 80 percent of landowners were exempt, greatly limiting the amount of land available. The nobles were reluctant to sell their land, further increasing tensions.

Guria's high dependence on maize as a cash crop exacerbated the issue further. While other products, notably silk and wine, were major sources of income in the Kutais Governorate, maize was by far the most important. In the 1880s over one-quarter of all Russian maize exports came from the Kutais Governorate; by 1901 it was producing 90 percent of all maize from the Transcaucasus. Exports were severely restricted in 1891 to help alleviate the shortages caused by the bad harvest in the rest of Russia that year; they did not recover until 1895. By that time grain from the United States had become popular, and the prices for maize dropped considerably. A poor harvest in Guria itself during 1902–1903 further agitated its peasantry.

== History ==
=== Formation of the republic ===
According to historian Stephen F. Jones, the Gurian Republic began in May 1902. A dispute over grazing rights in the village of Nigoiti between peasants and the local noble, Prince Machutadze, led to a meeting of peasants, who agreed to stop working on the Prince's land and stop paying rent. Led by former workers from Batumi, approximately 700 peasants met, organised by Grigol Uratadze, a member of the RSDLP. Uratadze sought the support of the RSDLP for the boycott, but they refused because of the overt religious elements of the meeting, such as swearing oaths on icons. They were reluctant to help a peasant movement, seeing social democracy as a worker-led movement. Nikolay Chkheidze, a Georgian Menshevik active in Batumi at the time, said that social democrats "cannot have a peasant movement under our banners." However two local Mensheviks, Noe Zhordania and Silibistro Jibladze, agreed to help. The peasants' demands included free grazing rights, rent reduction, and an end to payments to the clergy.

The movement gained momentum, with meetings occurring on a frequent basis, and by the spring of 1903 half of the region was involved. The following year 20 of the 25 rural societies (analogous to municipal governments) were participating in boycotts of landowners. The boycott was extended in January 1904 to include government institutions and the church, with further calls to seize these lands.

The authorities responded by arresting over 300 people, and several, including Zhordania and fellow Menshevik leader Noe Khomeriki were exiled to Siberia; this only encouraged further participation. The peasants wanted to use terrorism and acts of violence to support their movement, but this was not considered proper for revolutionaries and not promoted. By that time the Georgian Social Democrats, a branch of the RSDLP, agreed at a May 1903 meeting to support the Gurian Republic. They established a separate committee for "agricultural workers" that would focus on Guria, a term that attempted to reconcile Marxism with the peasant movement. Tsarist officials remained in Guria, though they were boycotted, with Luigi Villari, an Italian traveler who visited Guria in 1905, stating that "no Gurian would think of applying to a Government official for anything."

== Organization ==
=== System of government ===
The Gurian Republic's government was organised from the village level up, based on the legislation that came from the emancipation of the serfs. Village meetings were vested with supreme authority, and also served as a court. These meetings initially met infrequently, but by 1905 were assembling weekly. They were forums for a variety of topics, from banning expensive funerals and weddings to setting the curriculum for schools. They became increasingly political and could last for hours, even days, at a time. According to Gurian linguist Nikolai Marr, while the peasants took an active role in the meetings, the workers from the cities were largely running them.

Within a village a "circle" was made, and there were on average 10 circles for 90 households. Each circle would elect a "tensman" (Georgian: ათისთავი, atistavi) who then would select among themselves a "hundredsman" (Georgian: ასისთავი, asistavi). They would then elect representatives for the rural society, who selected their own regional representatives. All people were expected to contribute money or labour, and Villari reported that "one sometimes saw nobles, priests, peasants, and shopkeepers all manfully doing their turn of work."

These regional representatives would be the ones directly in contact with the Gurian Social Democratic Committee, established as a parallel governmental structure by the Social Democrats. Guria was divided into five regions, each led by a committee member, though the village assembly still held ultimate authority. Commissions were formed to set rent and establish grazing rights on confiscated land. In charge of the committee was Benia Chkhikvishvili, who was variously referred to as the "Gurian President" or the "Gurian King." According to Jones, "in all the meetings there was no sign of nationalism or anti-Russian feeling", as Russia was seen as a protector against a possible invasion from the neighbouring Ottoman Empire.

The decision to have two systems like this caused tension between the groups: the Social Democrats did not want to lose focus on their class struggles, while the peasants were angry at being excluded from the party. This was part of the larger division in the RSDLP that had led to a split between the Bolshevik and Menshevik factions at their Second Congress in August 1903: the Bolsheviks wanted the party to be more exclusive, while the Mensheviks were more willing to accommodate a variety of members, including peasants whom the Bolsheviks felt were not ready for class struggles. These factional differences, which also led to a split within the Georgian Social Democrats, had little impact on the Gurian Republic, with both Bolsheviks and Mensheviks at times being asked to participate in local debates.

Starting in 1903 there had been a slow expansion of the ideals of the Gurian Republic outside its borders, and by August 1904 it had firmly taken hold in neighbouring Imereti, which had 600 "circles" of its own by the end of 1905; similar movements also arose in nearby Mingrelia. Near the end of 1904 a two-ruble tax was instituted in Guria to purchase arms, leading the Tsarist authorities to fear an armed peasant uprising. "Red Detachments" were organised, and while nearly every Gurian was armed, they were not a serious force that could have deterred a real military invasion. A contemporary report noted that at most there were 2,000 rifles in the entire region, with not all of them in working order and a shortage of ammunition.

=== Justice ===
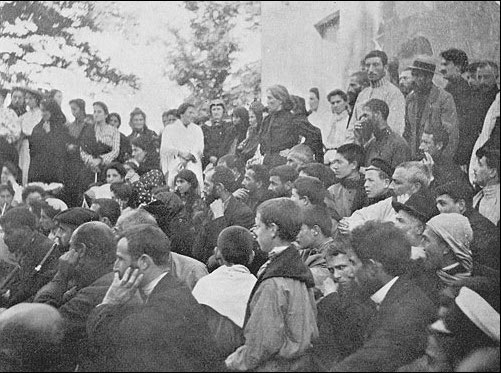
A popular tribunal in Ozurgeti, 1905

Justice was conducted under a system known as a "popular tribunal". As Villari noted, the "corruption and inefficiency of the Russian courts of justice in Georgia was a byword among the people and constituted one of the chief grievances of the inhabitants, who constantly but fruitlessly demanded that they should be reformed." Thus when the movement first began, locals immediately established their own judiciary, ignoring the Russian courts. The local courts were prone to make grave mistakes, with many individuals going for entertainment or to pursue grudges against others. Decisions were made by a majority vote, and women were allowed to participate.

The death penalty was retained, but not used; instead, the most severe form of punishment was a boycott of an individual. This was considered a terrible sentence: one contemporary said that "everyone feared the boycott" as it meant "expulsion from social life, isolation from one's neighbourhood, [and] the people's enmity." In even more extreme cases, the courts could have individuals expelled from their village or town. Other methods were employed as well: Villari notes that in one case two peasants were convicted of adultery and forced to ride a donkey naked through the town while proclaiming their guilt and swearing to live a better life. The Tsarist police, effectively powerless, were unable to carry out any arrests.

Villari witnessed a trial where about 200 people gathered for the case. A merchant who had been convicted of adultery and sentenced to a boycott was appealing it. After he made his case, there was advocacy both for and against him, until a motion to withdraw the boycott passed with a simple majority vote.

=== 1905 Revolution ===
On 9 January 1905 (Note: All dates are given in Old Style. The Russian Empire used the Julian calendar rather than the Gregorian calendar; in the early 20th century the Julian calendar was 13 days behind the Gregorian.) soldiers fired upon a crowd of demonstrators in Saint Petersburg. Later known as Bloody Sunday, this was one of the primary causes of the 1905 Russian Revolution. Protests against Tsarist rule broke out across the Russian Empire, exacerbated by continual defeats during the Russo-Japanese War, and the situation in Guria became much more violent. Terrorist activities became common, usually arson of police stations and local administrative offices (which held land records). Eight police officers were stationed in Guria at the start of 1905; one was murdered, one wounded, two ran away, and the other four resigned their posts.

The acting governor-general of the Caucasus, Yakov Malama, notified the authorities in Saint Petersburg that "The situation in the Ozurgeti district and surrounding areas is assuming the character of a rebellion" and requested military assistance to handle it. Before a reply was sent Malama ordered Maksud Alikhanov-Avarsky west from Tiflis, with full military authority, to handle the situation. Alikhanov-Avarsky, known as a brutal military commander, declared martial law in Guria in February and was named the governor of the Kutais Governorate ten days later, but before he moved west a petition of leading Georgians convinced Malama to call it off his military intervention and instead resolve the troubles in Guria diplomatically.

=== Tsarist response ===
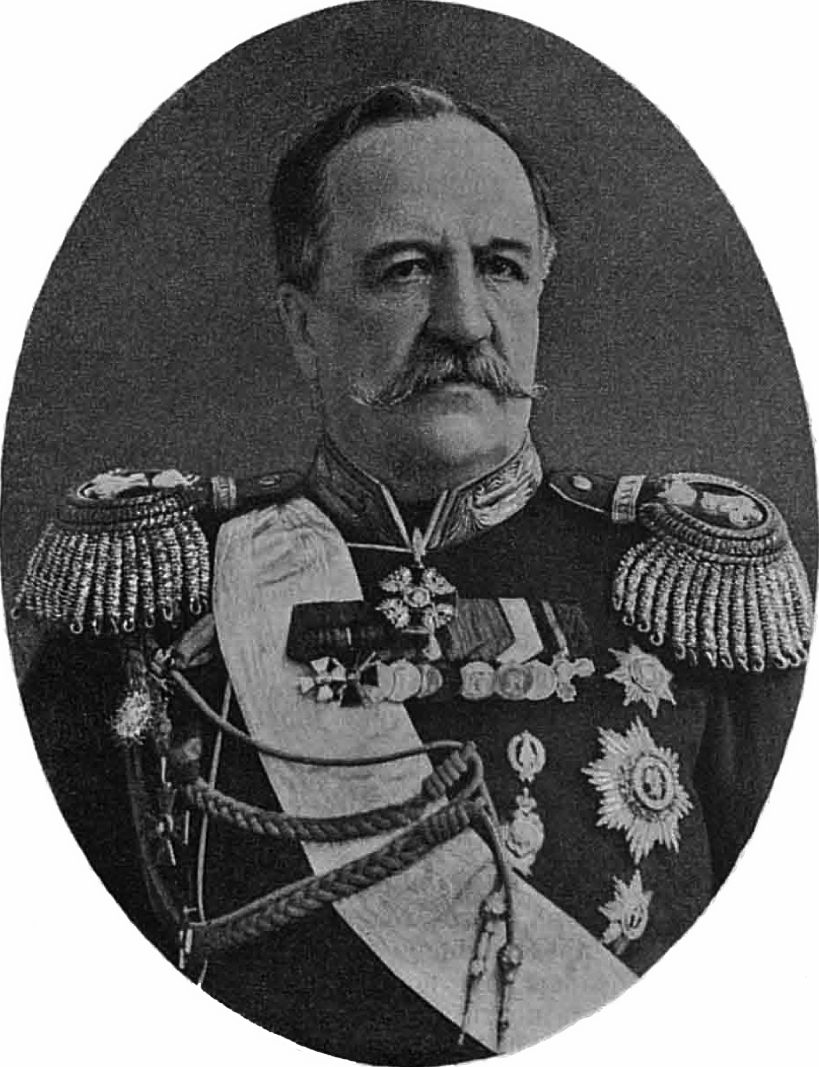
Illarion Vorontsov-Dashkov. Seen as a moderate, he was appointed Viceroy of the Caucasus in February 1905 and tasked with resolving the Gurian Republic issue.

At the end of February a new Viceroy of the Caucasus, Illarion Vorontsov-Dashkov, was appointed and given sweeping powers to end the rebellion, particularly in Guria. The position of viceroy had been replaced with a governor-general, who held reduced authority, in the 1880s as the imperial government tried to centralise control over the Caucasus. Vorontsov-Dashkov was seen as a moderate and less reactionary than Alikhanov-Avarsky, and rather than use military force sent a sole representative, Sultan Krym-Girei, to tour Guria and hear local grievances. Krym-Girei spent a few weeks in the region attending meetings at which he told the Gurians that Vorontsov-Dashkov was willing to make broad concessions and agree to any reasonable request, but rebellions broke out closer to Tiflis, and within two weeks he was recalled.

Krym-Girei was nonetheless able to take in several of the main issues facing the Gurian Republic, mainly political and economic demands, and was clear they wished to remain part of the Russian Empire; as historian David Marshall Lang wrote, the Gurians "merely desired to emerge from their colonial status and enjoy the same rights and privileges as the citizens of European Russia." Krym-Girei later said that the demands of the Gurians were too extreme to seriously consider, and that the Constitution of France would not have been enough to satisfy them. He did give four recommendations to Vorontsov-Dashkov: replacement of appointed elders by elected individuals; the restoration of libraries; allowing the return of those in administrative exile; and the removal of soldiers stationed in Guria. The first two were eventually implemented.

In May Vorontsov-Dashkov appointed Vladimir Staroselski governor of the Kutais Governorate, and tasked him with devising a land reform policy. An agronomist, Staroselski had previously worked in Georgia to help combat the spread of phylloxera, and was well known to the Georgian intelligentsia as a liberal. He accepted the position with conditions, namely that martial law be ended and that "arbitrary behaviour" of officials, including questionable arrests, also be ended; within 10 days of his appointment both had been met. He further enabled the Gurian Republic by attending meetings, reportedly released prisoners, and used trains controlled by the committees. Uratadze later wrote that he was unusual, "a real nihilist member of the intelligentsia, more of an idealist than an administrator".

=== End of the Republic ===
The rebellions continued throughout 1905, and with no end in sight the military was dispatched by the authorities in August to restore order in eastern Georgia. Several people were killed as a result, which heightened tensions throughout Georgia, and Guria armed itself and cut off all transit between it and the rest of the Caucasus. Tsar Nicholas II's announcement of the October Manifesto, a precursor to the Russian Empire's first Constitution that would grant freedom of speech, assembly, and the establishment of an elected legislative body, the Duma, lowered tensions again. The Manifesto was seen by the Caucasus administration as an endorsement of its liberal policies, and a confirmation that using force to re-integrate Guria would only lead to further destabilisation across the Empire. Staroselski went to Guria and met with the leadership there to discuss terms of ending the rebellion; after some debate the Gurian Republic determined that they would only agree to ending the boycott if the provisions of the Manifesto were properly implemented; until that point they would continue their efforts.

Despite these assurances, clashes continued between the peasants and the government. Vorontsov-Dashkov again attempted a military solution, sending a detachment of 100 Cossacks to Guria. They were repelled in battle by a number of armed Gurians (between 1,000 and 4,000; sources differ) on 20 October at Nasakirali; 14 Cossacks were killed. Before further expeditions could be sent, Staroselski and intelligentsia from Tiflis dissuaded Vorontsov-Dashkov, who hoped negotiations could continue.

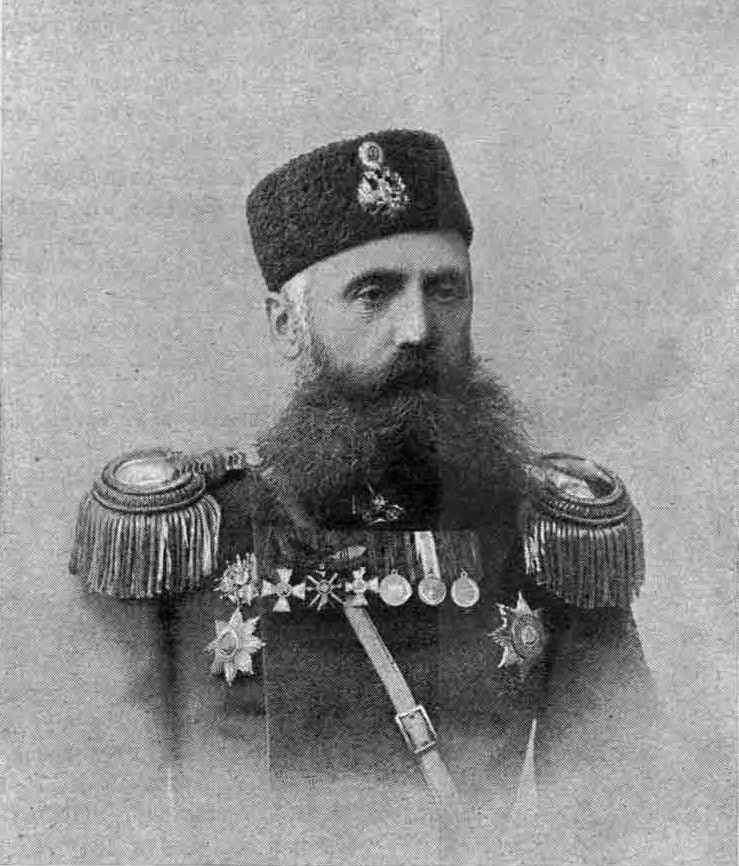
Maksud Alikhanov-Avarsky led a military invasion in 1906 that ended the Gurian Republic. He restored government order using repressive measures within a few weeks.

In late November and early December tsarist forces began to re-assert control in both Saint Petersburg and Moscow. With the end of the war with Japan Nicholas felt comfortable enough to use military force to end the uprisings, more so as promises of reform had failed to have any real effect. In response a general strike was called for Tiflis in December, while the railway and telegraph lines were captured in Kutaisi. That month Vorontsov-Dashkov named Malama military governor of Tiflis, but quickly replaced him with Alikhanov-Avarsky, who he tasked with restoring order to the city by whatever means necessary. In response the Gurians moved east and blocked the Surami Pass, the lone railway link between western and eastern Georgia, and prepared for a military invasion. No train was allowed to cross without their permission, effectively cutting western Georgia off from the rest of the Empire.

With the uprisings in Russia ended, orders came in late December to resolve the situation militarily, and have all the revolutionaries arrested. The next month, on orders of the Tsar, Staroselski was removed from his position as governor of the Kutais Governorate, and replaced by Alikhanov-Avarsky. Alikhanov-Avarsky had his predecessor arrested immediately for his failure to resolve the crisis and sent to Tiflis, and began harsh reprisals in an attempt to restore order. An attempted stand at the Surami Pass by the Gurians failed to stop Alikhanov-Avarsky, who reached Kutaisi by the middle of January. He issued a proclamation stating that if order was not restored he would do it by force, deadly force if necessary. By mid-February 20 battalions of soldiers, a squadron of Cossacks, and 26 cannons were sent to restore government control over Guria. People were forced to publicly swear allegiance to the Tsar, and those who refused were either exiled to Siberia or shot.

By mid-March, the Gurian Republic was effectively abolished, and Guria was once again integrated into the Empire. This came at a terrible cost: hundreds of buildings were destroyed, about 300 people were deported to Siberia, and an unknown number were killed. A report by a Social Democratic newspaper that March said that Ozurgeti no longer existed and that houses had been burned in many villages. The occupation would last several more months, and did not let up: in a speech to the Duma in 1909, Evgeni Gegechkori, who represented Kutaisi, noted that in eight months of occupation in Guria, 80,000 rubles in fines were issued, 381 houses and 400 shops were burnt down. Military courts were established in August 1906; they sentenced 73 to death, 62 to hard labour, and 4 to exile. (Note: These figures do not include court-martial sentences.)

== Aftermath ==
Though protests continued sporadically through 1907, the Gurian Republic was over. The organisers of the movement knew that their ideas could be successful; labour organiser Eric Lee has written that "it turned out to be a harbinger for a much larger experiment in 'revolutionary self-government,'" a reference to the Democratic Republic of Georgia that would be established in 1918 and led by many of the Social Democrats associated with the Gurian Republic.

The repressive measures of Vorontsov-Dashkov and Alikhanov-Avarsky were not forgotten; both were the target of multiple assassination attempts after the uprisings. Vorontsov-Dashkov was wounded several times but survived all attempts on his life; he continued to pursue tolerant policies in the Caucasus in an attempt to mollify the population. He was finally replaced in 1916 by the Tsar's cousin Grand Duke Nicholas in order to lead the Caucasus Campaign of the First World War. Alikhanov-Avarsky was assassinated by an Armenian group in July 1907 in Alexandropol. Chkhikvishvili fled Guria to avoid arrest, but was later detained and at a trial in Odessa in 1908 was sentenced to four years in prison.

== Legacy ==
Modern borders of Guria in Georgia

The Gurian Republic has been called "the most effective and organized peasant movement in the [Russian] empire" by Jones. Due to its location on the fringes of the Empire, both geographically and politically, the authorities were slow to respond and Guria was able to sustain the republic for several years. Jones has noted that the "social, economic, and ethnic homogeneity of the region" were important factors in its success, as it was unique within Georgia for being an overwhelmingly peasant, ethnically Georgian region.

Socialism, particularly the social democratic views of the local Georgian intelligentsia, played a major role in the Gurian Republic. Jones has cautioned that the success of the movement "was not due to the strength of Marx's ideas," as most participants were "religious believers who swore oaths on icons" and peasants who simply wanted to own their own land. Lee by contrast argued that it should be seen as a serious "test of Marxism in theory and practice", and that it was arguably "even more important than the Paris Commune."

Many of the leading figures of the Democratic Republic of Georgia, which existed from 1918 until 1921 and was led by Georgian Mensheviks, Lee notes, were Gurians who had earlier participated in the movement in Guria. This was recognised by the Mensheviks themselves — Akaki Chkhenkeli, who later served in the Georgian government, said in 1908 that the "Gurian movement was the most important stage on the path of Georgian social democracy's independent self-development ... it forced social democracy to pay attention to the peasantry." It also forced the Georgian Social Democrats to realise the importance of incorporating the peasants into the movement, an idea previously downplayed by leading Social Democrats. This helped solve the dilemma of utilising Marxism (which was traditionally oriented towards the working class) into a rural society (which encompassed much of the Russian Empire). According to Lee, while not fully implemented by the Bolsheviks or Mensheviks, the ideas of the Gurian Republic were a clear indication of how such an issue could be resolved, and were used by the government of the Democratic Republic of Georgia when it was formed in 1918.

== Bibliography ==
- Jones, S.F. (July 1989), "Marxism and Peasant Revolt in the Russian Empire: The Case of the Gurian Republic", The Slavonic and East European Review, 67 (3): 403–434, JSTOR 4210029
- Jones, Stephen F. (2005), Socialism in Georgian Colors: The European Road to Social Democracy 1883–1917, Cambridge, Massachusetts: Harvard University Press, ISBN 978-0-67-401902-7
- Lang, David Marshall (1962), A Modern History of Soviet Georgia, New York City: Grove Press, OCLC 317495278
- Lang, David Marshall (1957), The Last Years of the Georgian Monarchy: 1658–1832, New York City: Columbia University Press, OCLC 561875674
- Lee, Eric (2017), The Experiment: Georgia's Forgotten Revolution, 1918–1921, London: Zed Books, ISBN 978-1-78699-092-1
- Mchedishvili, David A. (2012), ბენია ჩხიკვიშვილი [benia chkhikvishvili], The Biographical Dictionary of Georgia, archived from the original on December 10, 2020
- Pate, Alice K. (2005), "Generational Conflict and the Gurian Republic in Georgia to 1905", The Soviet and Post-Soviet Review, 32 (2–3): 255–268, doi:10.1163/187633205X00096
- Rayfield, Donald (2012), Edge of Empires: A History of Georgia, London: Reaktion Books, ISBN 978-1-78-023030-6
- Shanin, Teodor (1997), Революция как момент истины: 1905–1907 гг. – 1917–1922 гг. [Revolution as a Moment of Truth: 1905–1907 – 1917–1922] (in Russian), Moscow: Bes Mir, ISBN 978-5-7777-0039-1
- Suny, Ronald Grigor (1994), The Making of the Georgian Nation (Second ed.), Bloomington, Indiana: Indiana University Press, ISBN 978-0-25-320915-3
- Uratadze, Grigol (1968), Воспоминания грузинского социал-демократа [Memoirs of a Georgian Social-Democrat] (in Russian), Stanford, California: Hoover Institution on War, Revolution, and Peace, OCLC 881537801
- Villari, Luigi (1906), Fire and Sword in the Caucasus, London: T. Fisher Unwin, OCLC 1004566072
- Zhghenti, Tengiz (1936), 1905 წლის გურიაში [1905 in Guria] (in Georgian), Tbilisi
