= Battle of Choloki (1854) =

1854 battle of the Crimean War

- Part of Crimean War
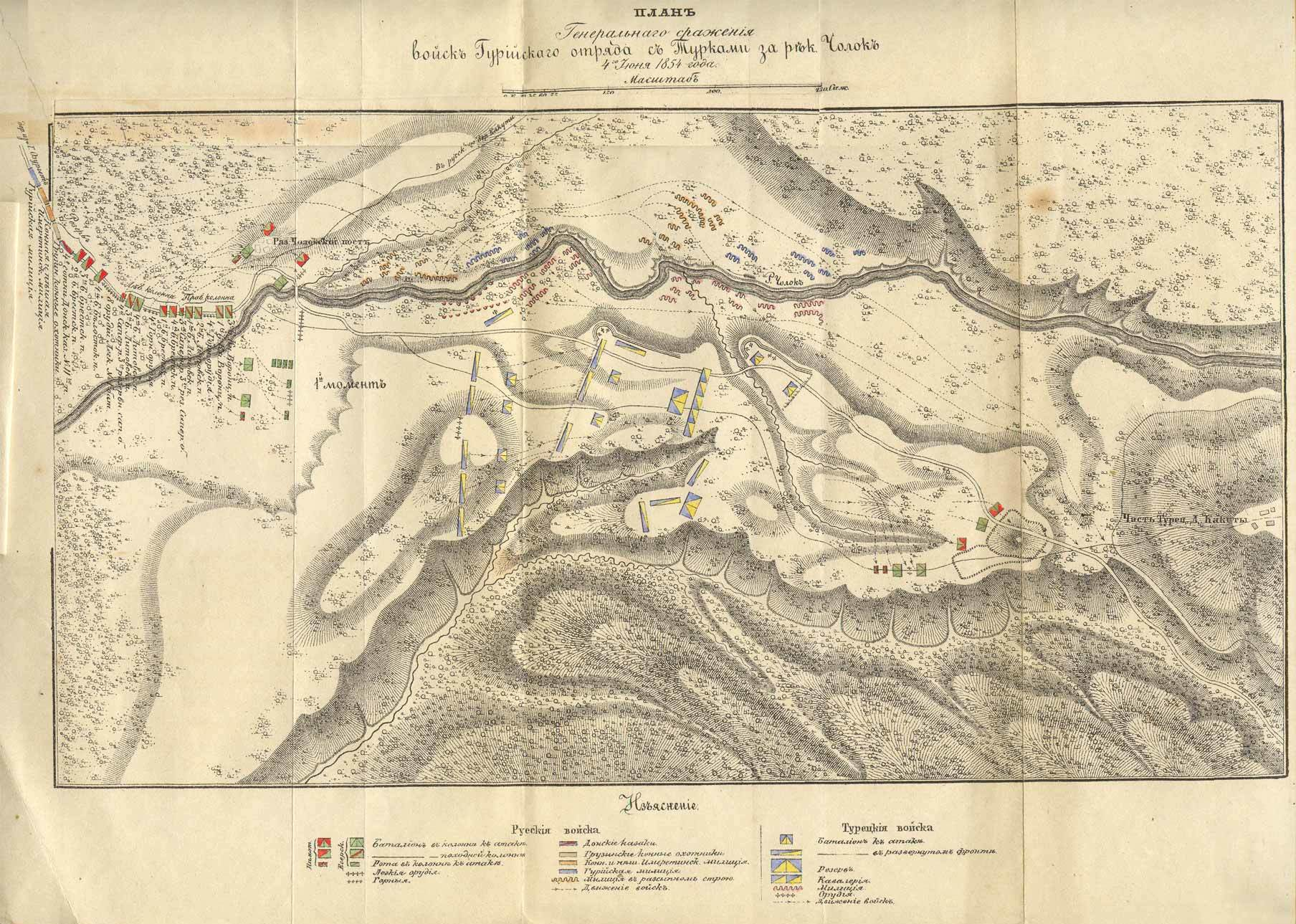
- Battle plan illustrating position of forces around Choloki
| Date | June 4, 1854 |
| Location | Kakuti, Ozurgeti uezd, Kutaisi Governorate, Russian Empire 41°51′15″N 41°58′15″E |
| Result | Russian victory |

Belligerents
| Russian Empire | Ottoman Empire |

Commanders and leaders
| Ivane Andronikashvili | Mehmed Pasha |

Strength
| 10,000 | 35,000 |

Casualties and losses
| 1,500 killed. Unknown number of wounded or captured. | 4,000 killed. Unknown number of wounded or captured. |

The Battle of Choloki took place on 4 June 1854 on the outskirts of village Kakuti in Guria, Georgia during the Crimean War. Under the command of General Ivane Andronikashvili, the invading Turks were successfully repelled and defeated.

== Background ==
In May 1854, Ottoman troops launched an offensive against Georgia. A detachment of 12 thousand under the command of Mehmed Pasha invaded Georgia, intending to capture Kutaisi and go to the rear of the Russian army in the Caucasus. However, in the Battle of Nigoiti detachment of Hassan was defeated by vanguard of Akhaltsikhe detachment of Colonel Nikolai Eristavi, and Hassan himself was killed. The remnants of the Ottoman troops fled to Ozurgeti, where the Ottonans concentrated Mehmed Pasha's corps.

== Battle ==
Having received a report of the victory at Nigoiti, Ivane Andronikashvili moved with the main forces of his detachment on 29 May, from Marani to Ozurgeti. Ottomans not waiting for the approach of Russian troops, threw in Ozurgeti large stocks of food and retreated behind the Choloki river. General Andronikashvili, having had time to gather at the tract of Nagomari 11.5 battalions and 2 thousand men of foot militia and irregular cavalry, in total up to 10 thousand men with 18 guns, captured Ozurgeti on 3 June, and the next day marched in the direction of the Ottoman camp. The Ottoman corps under Mehmed Pasha, up to 34 thousand men with 13 guns, were positioned in a position covered from the front by field fortifications and secured on the right flank by a steep almost inaccessible ravine, and on the left by a dense forest.

The Russian troops crossed the Choloki River in two columns, each column having 4 mountain guns and one company of sappers. General Brunner's column was followed by 8 light guns, and behind them in reserve by the 4th battalion of the Bialystok and two battalions of the Brest regiment with two mountain guns, commanded by Colonel Karganov. Behind the infantry followed all the cavalry; the foot militia was partly scattered in front of the infantry columns, partly sent to the right flank of the enemy, to divert his attention from the proposed point of the main attack - the left flank of the Ottoman position. The enemy, amazed by the sudden appearance of our columns from the dense forest, hastened to strengthen his left wing. A light battery advanced at a trot from the forest to the centre of the fighting order, and the mountain guns, under the general command of Colonel Mamatsev, opened an accurate fire. General Meidel's troops were ordered to march at bayonets, and to assist them the fourth battalions of the Brest and Lithuanian regiments were advanced to the right of Brunner's second line, under his personal command. The Russian artillery moved forward, together with the advancing infantry, to the nearest cartridge shot, opened a rapid firing, and then the battalions of the Kurin regiment, struck at bayonets, overturned the enemy and broke into the camp; Mehmed Pasha sent to maintain the battle lines all his reserve and met the advancing columns with cartridges and battalion fire of infantry. The Kurinians suffered considerable damage and were forced to fall back.

At this moment, General Andronikashvili launched a general attack: a light battery was brought forward and showered the enemy with buckshot; three battalions of the Brest, 4th Bialystok and 3rd Lithuanian regiments, followed by the Kurin jaegers, with a drumbeat, rushed to the bayonets; Cossacks, advancing from both sides into the camp. The Georgian cavalry, having overtaken the rubble from the rear, attacked one of the Ottoman battalions, crashed into it and captured a banner and three badges. The Gurian foot militia repulsed a mountain gun. Of the other Ottoman guns, which all went as booty to the victors, captured: three by Major Cheplevsky with the 4th battalion of the Bialystok regiment; two by Lieutenant-Colonel Osipov with the 3rd battalion of the Brest regiment; three by Lieutenant-Colonel Brevern with the 3rd battalion of the Kurin regiment, and four by Lieutenant-Colonel Prince Shalikov with the 1st battalion of the Brest regiment, supported by the 3rd battalion of the Lithuanian regiment, under Major Makryz, who was wounded by two rifle bullets and buckshot. The Ottomans defended stubbornly in their blockades, but, driven from there by bayonets, turned to flight.

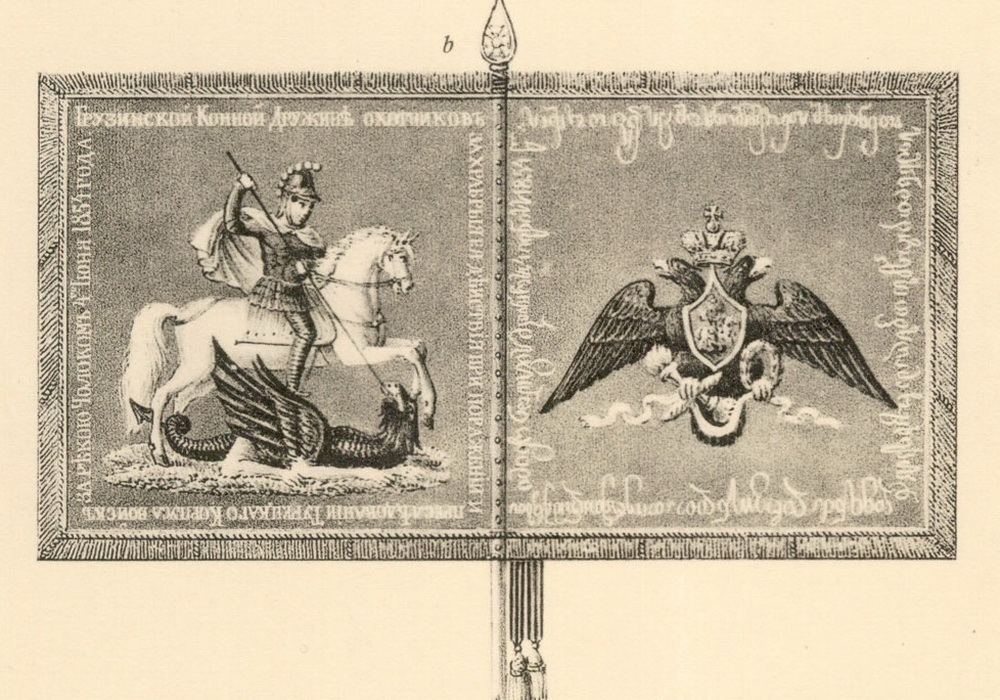
Bilingual Georgian-Russian military standard of 1855, commemorating the courage of Georgian cavalry in battle against the Turks.

Andronikashvili entrusted the pursuit to the 1st, 2nd and 4th battalions of the Lithuanian Jaeger Regiment, the 4th battalion of the Brest Infantry Regiment and sapper companies, with 4 mountain guns, under the command of Major-General Brunner; they were followed by two more battalions of the Brest Regiment with 2 mountain guns, and Georgian militia, under the command of Colonel Karganov. General Brunner pursued the enemy as far as the villages of Liakhva. General Brunner chased the enemy until the Ottomans completely dispersed, and the Georgian militia pursued them for about two more hours.

The Ottomans' losses totalled up to 4,000 men, and according to other sources up to 5,000; all the artillery, 36 banners and badges, and the entire camp were captured by the Russians. The Ottoman militia, numbering 14,000 men, scattered. Mehmed Pasha's himself fled to Kobuleti with a small detachment.

Emperor Nicholas, having received a report on the victory at Choloki, granted Ivane Andronikashvili the Order of Saint Alexander Nevsky. The Order of St. George of the 4th degree was awarded to: Major-General Maydel, Colonel Mamamy, Lieutenant-Colonels Brevern and Djandierov, Major Makryz, Captain Talvinsky of the Brest Infantry Regiment, who, being wounded, stayed in front of his company and was the first to run up to the enemy battery, Captain Dudnichenko of the Kurin Regiment and Lieutenant Bykovsky of the Lithuanian Jaeger Regiment.

== Sources ==
- G. Narsia, Georgian Soviet Encyclopedia, XI, p. 146–147, Tbilisi, 1987
- Allen W. E. D., Muratoff P. P. Caucasian Battlefields: A History of the Wars on the Turco-Caucasian Border. 1828—1921
