= Battle of Nigoiti =

1854 battle of the Crimean War

- Part of Crimean War
Date	20–27 May, 1854
Location	Nigoiti, Ozurget Uyezd, Kutais Governorate, Russian Empire 42°05′00″N 42°06′30″E
Result	Russian victory

Belligerents
Russia	Ottoman Empire

Commanders and leaders
Ivane Andronikashvili; Nikoloz Eristavi	Selim Pasha

Strength
3,000 men in 2 battalions, 4 cannons	12,000

Casualties and losses
600 killed and wounded	2,000 killed and wounded

The battle of Nigoiti took place between 20 and 27 May 1854 the village of Nigoiti in Guria during the Crimean War.

Russo-Georgian detachments, under the command of Ivane Andronikashvili, met an invading Ottoman force that had crossed the Choloki river, the border between the Russian and Ottoman Empires. Ozurgeti, the capital of Guria, had been occupied by the Ottoman since 11 April, and with the Russian victory at Nigoiti it allowed the Russian forces under Andronikashvili to move towards it, leading to the Battle of Choloki on 4 June.
