= Safeguard (disambiguation) =

A safeguard is a tool of international trade.

Safeguard may also refer to some of the following:

- A combined understanding of child safeguarding and the similar safeguarding of vulnerable adults (broadly construed).

== In the military ==
- Safeguard (military), a detachment, guard or detail or a written order for the protection of enemy or neutral persons, places, or property in wartime, pledging respect for that person or property by a nation's armed forces.
- Safeguard Program, a US anti-ballistic missile system
- USNS Safeguard (T-ARS-50), lead ship of the US Navy's current class of marine salvage ships

== In government and law ==
- Safeguards Rule, promulgated under the Gramm-Leach-Bliley Act, requires financial institutions to have a security plan to protect the confidentiality and integrity of personal consumer information
- Safeguarding (planning law) is a process by which a proposed route or location of an infrastructure project is protected from conflicting development

== In software ==
- Trend Micro SafeGuard, a secure browser for Windows 8 by Trend Micro
- 360 Safeguard, a Chinese computer security program for Windows

== Other uses ==
- SAFEGUARD®, a brand of polymer banknote substrate, material that company De La Rue uses for the banknotes of various countries
- Safeguard Coaches, a bus and coach operator based in Guildford, England
- Safeguard (costume), riding garment
- Safeguard (magazine), a New Zealand occupational health and safety bi-monthly
- Safeguard Scientifics, a venture capital firm
- Safeguard (soap), a brand of bar soap sold in the United States
- Safeguard (Transformers), a Mini-Con in the Transformers: Cybertron toy line
- IAEA safeguards, a system of inspection and verification of the peaceful uses of nuclear materials
