= Vladimir Staroselski =

- Владимир Старосельский (Russian)

Governor of Kutais Governorate
- In office May 1905 – January 1906

Personal details
- Born: 15 November [O.S. 3 November] 1860 Chernigov, Chernigov Governorate, Russian Empire
- Died: 26 August 1916 (aged 55) Paris, France

Vladimir Aleksandrovich Staroselski (Russian: Владимир Александрович Старосельский; 15 November [O.S. 3 November] 1860 – 26 August 1916) was an Imperial Russian official who served as the governor of the Kutais Governorate from May 1905 to January 1906. A graduate of the Petrovsky Agricultural Academy (ru), he was a known agronomist who had helped stop the spread of phylloxera in Georgia in the 1880s, and was well-known to the Georgian intelligentsia. Appointed governor of Kutais in May 1905 to help with the Republic of Guria peasant revolt, he was asked to help in land reform, one of the key demands of the uprising. He proved too liberal in his dealings, and on the orders of Tsar Nicholas II was removed from his position in January 1906.

== Bibliography ==
- Jones, S.F. (July 1989), "Marxism and Peasant Revolt in the Russian Empire: The Case of the Gurian Republic", The Slavonic and East European Review, 67 (3): 403–434
- Jones, Stephen F. (2005), Socialism in Georgian Colors: The European Road to Social Democracy 1883–1917, Cambridge, Massachusetts: Harvard University Press, ISBN 978-0-67-401902-7
- Suny, Ronald Grigor (1994), The Making of the Georgian Nation (Second ed.), Bloomington, Indiana: Indiana University Press, ISBN 978-0-25-320915-3
