= Nasakirali =

Nasakirali ნასაკირალი
- Village
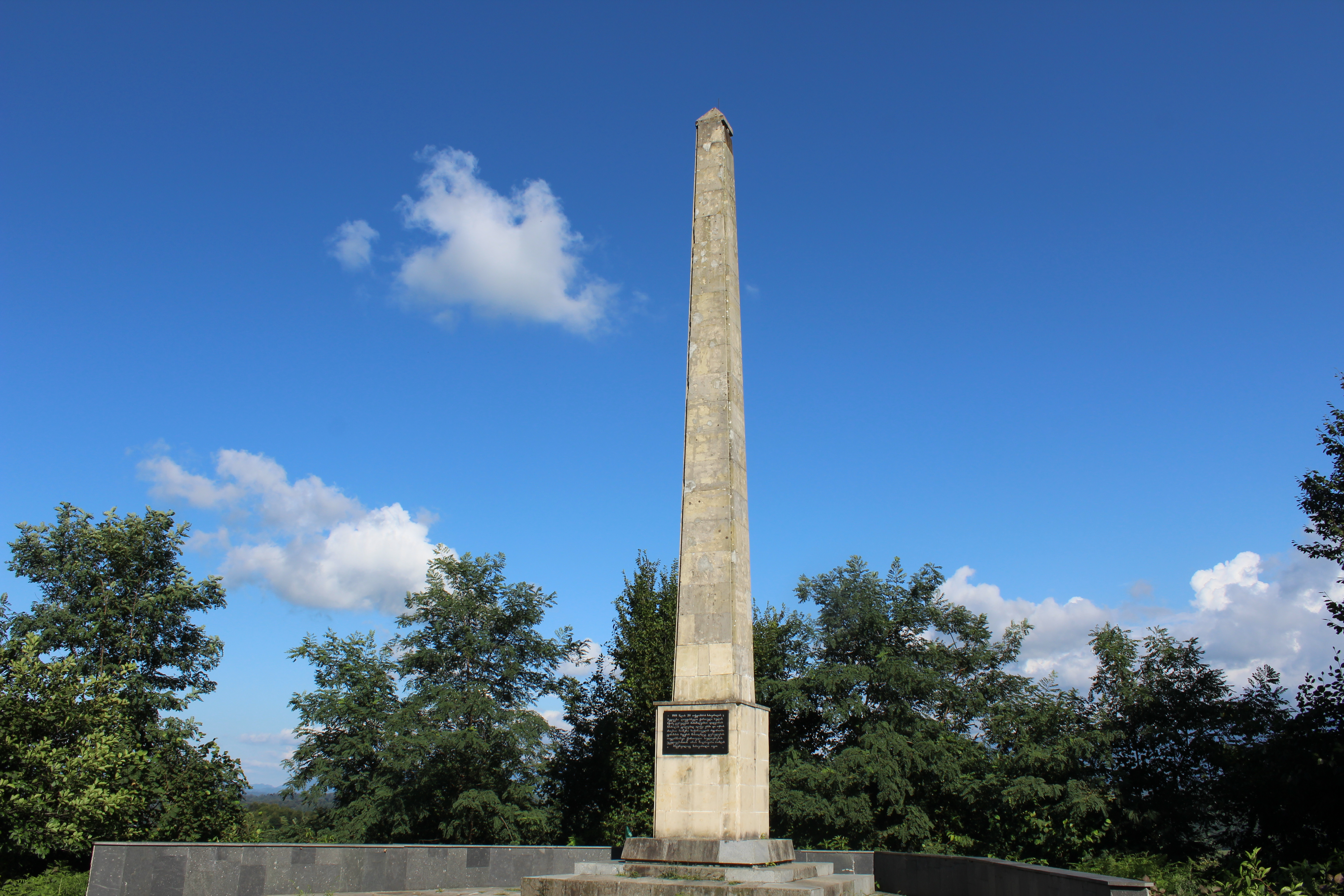
- Monument commemorating a 1905 battle between the Republic of Guria and Cossacks

- Location within Georgia Location within Guria
- Coordinates: 41°58′20″N 42°03′50″E
- Country: Georgia
- Mkhare: Guria
- Municipality: Ozurgeti
- Elevation: 105 m (344 ft)

Population (2014)
  - Total: 137
- Time zone: UTC+4 (Georgian Time)

Nasakirali (Georgian: ნასაკირალი is a village in the Ozurgeti Municipality of Guria in western Georgia.

== History ==
=== Battle of Nasakirali (1905) ===
On 20 October 1905, during the Russian Revolution, a small battle took place near the village, between forces of the insurgent Republic of Guria and a small band of Cossacks sent to restore Tsarist authority. The Cossacks were repulsed in battle by a number of armed Gurians (between 1,000 and 4,000; sources differ), with fourteen Cossacks being killed. Before further expeditions could be sent, Staroselski and intelligentsia from Tiflis dissuaded Vorontso-Dashkov, who hoped negotiations could continue. An obelisk was built to commemorate the battle in 1965.

== Bibliography ==
- Jones, S.F. (July 1989), "Marxism and Peasant Revolt in the Russian Empire: The Case of the Gurian Republic", The Slavonic and East European Review, 67 (3): 403–434
- Zhghenti, Tengiz (1936), 1905 წლის გურიაში [1905 in Guria] (in Georgian), Tbilisi
