= Shawn M. Galloway =

American author, workplace safety consultant and profession speaker

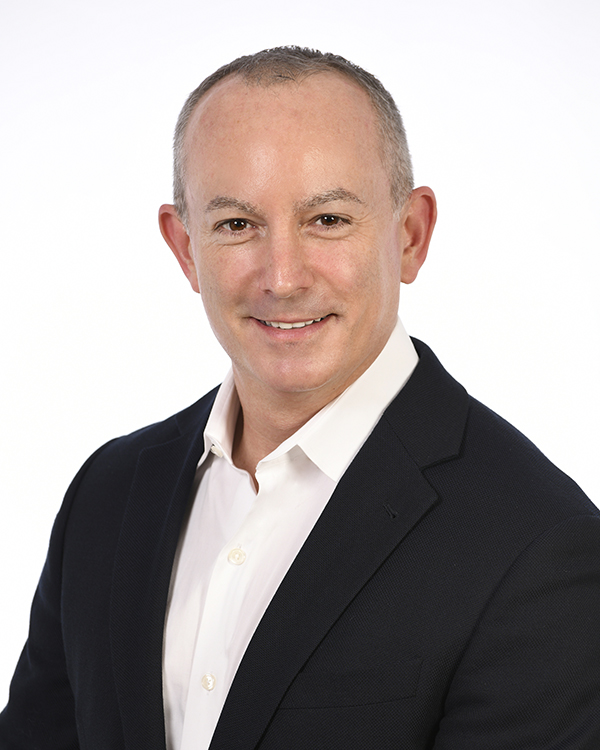
- Born: 1976 (age 49–50); Houston, Texas
- Occupations: Author, consultant, speaker
- Website: shawnmgalloway.com

Shawn M. Galloway (born 1976) is an American author, workplace safety consultant and professional speaker. He is the chief executive officer of ProAct Safety, a safety consulting firm. He is best known for his books STEPS to Safety Culture Excellence, Inside Strategy: Value Creation from Within Your Organization and Bridge to Excellence: Building Capacity for Sustainable Performance.

== Life and education ==
Galloway was born in Houston and attended school in Clinton, New Jersey and in Houston, Texas. He joined the United States Army as an enlisted soldier in 1993, serving for 8 years, and also in the Texas Army National Guard and Army Reserves. He attended the University of Phoenix to pursue his degree in business management.

Shawn lives in Houston, Texas. He is the co-owner of Galloway Cattle Company with operations in Hockley, Texas. Since 2016, he has served as a volunteer for the Houston Livestock Show and Rodeo on the Calf Scramble Committee.

== Career ==
After college, Galloway worked for Offset Services for a year and later was hired by Fluor Daniel in 1997 to help start their Photogammetry Engineering offerings.

In 2003, he joined ATR which led him to be recruited at ProAct Safety in 2005 as a Managing Consultant. In 2008, he was named president and chief operating officer, and as of July 2021, he serves as the CEO of ProAct Safety.

Since January 2008, Galloway hosts a weekly podcast called Safety Culture Excellence®. He is a frequent speaker at American Society of Safety Professionals (ASSP) conferences and National Safety Council events.

== Books ==
- 2013 – STEPS to Safety Culture Excellence ISBN 978-1118098486 (co-authored by Terry L. Mathis)
- 2013 – AHMP 3rd Edition Hazardous Materials Management Desk Reference ISBN 978-0615848013
- 2015 – Forecasting Tomorrow: The Future of Safety Excellence ISBN 978-0692460580 (co-authored by Terry L. Mathis)
- 2016 – Inside Strategy: Value Creation from Within Your Organization ISBN 978-0692631898 (co-authored by Terry L. Mathis)
- 2017 – Lean Behavior-Based Safety: BBS for Today's Realities ISBN 978-0692868263 (co-authored by Terry L. Mathis)
- 2023 – COACH: A Safety Leadership Fable ISBN 979-8987387306
- 2023 – Bridge to Excellence: Building Capacity for Sustainable Performance ISBN 979-8987387313
- 2025 – Shared Ownership: Engaging the Subcultures ISBN 979-8987387337

== Recognition ==
Galloway was featured in NSC Rising Stars of Safety list by National Safety Council and 50 People Who Most Influenced EHS list by EHS Today. He was also recognized in the POWER 101 – Leaders of the EHS World list, Up and Coming Thought Leaders list and 50 Leaders for Today and Tomorrow list by ISHN magazine. In 2016, he received the significant contributor award from ASSP Council on Practices and Standards.
