= Girei (disambiguation) =

Girei is a place in Nigeria. It may also refer to:

- Abubakar Girei
- Sultan Krym-Girei
- Krym-Girei
