= The New International Review =

Quarterly journal

The New International Review was a quarterly journal of democratic socialist theory and analysis published from 1977 to 1989. Its founding editor was Eric Lee.

The journal was initially published in the USA and moved to Israel in 1981.

It featured original articles, book reviews, and new translations and reprints aimed at reviving certain a democratic socialist, anti-Stalinist tradition. These included articles by and about the Menshevik Julian Martov, Karl Kautsky, Rosa Luxemburg, Max Shachtman and others.

Its name was based on two earlier American socialist journals—The New International, published by Shachtman and his groups (the Workers Party, the Independent Socialist League) and the International Review, published in the 1930s by independent leftists who were critical of Bolshevism—among them "Integer", the pen name of Herman Jerson.

The review struggled throughout its history to make ends meet, and never had more than 500 paying subscribers. It came out at best twice a year in the 1980s and folded just as the Stalinist regimes in Eastern Europe and the Soviet Union were collapsing.

Several of the individuals involved with the review have come together decades later in the LabourStart project.
