= Eric Lee (labor organizer) =

American labor activist (born 1955)

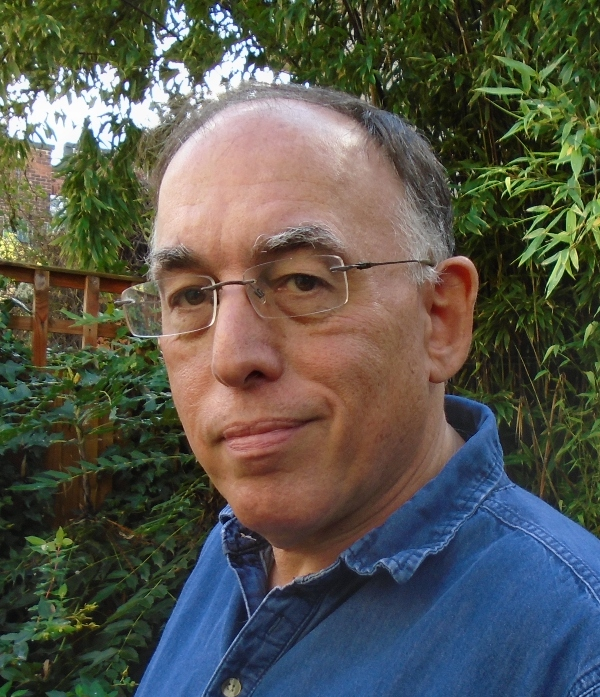
- Born: 14 July 1955 (age 70); New York, New York, U.S.
- Title: Editor of LabourStart

Eric Lee (born 1955) is an American-born activist and author. He was born in New York City and is the founding editor of LabourStart, an online news service for the international trade union movement. He is also the author of The Labour Movement and the Internet: The New Internationalism (Pluto Press, 1996) and several other books.

== Career ==
Lee worked as an editor for the social democratic magazine The New International Review. While living in Israel, he worked as a computer programmer and was politically active in the peace movement and the left.

In the 1990s, Lee created and ran the website BibiWatch, dedicated to criticism of Israeli Prime Minister Binyamin Netanyahu.

In this same year, he served on the Central Committee of the United Workers Party.

Lee is the author of The Labour Movement and the Internet: The New Internationalism.

In 1998, Lee moved to London to work as ICT Coordinator for Labour and Society International while also consulting British and international trade unions. His articles have been published around the world and is a frequent speaker at a variety of conferences.

Lee was a member of the Democratic Socialist Organizing Committee from 1975 to 1981, and joined its successor organizations, the Democratic Socialists of America, during the Bernie Sanders 2016 presidential campaign. In 2017, Lee resigned from the DSA in response to their endorsement of Boycott, Divestment and Sanctions, which he considers antisemitic and racist.

== Personal ==
Lee is active in the democratic left and trade unions. He is a Labor Zionist and has called out antisemitism from the right and the left.
