= Battle of Akhaltsikhe (1853) =

1853 battle of the Crimean War

- Part of the Crimean War
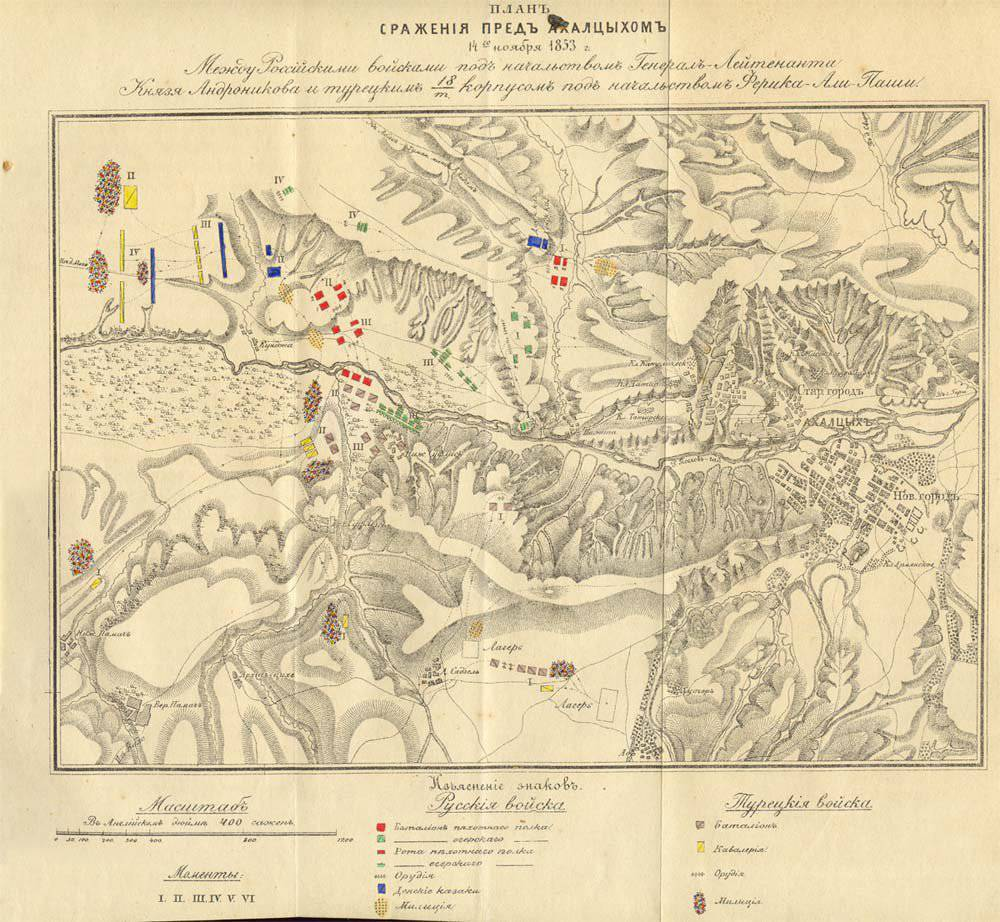
- The scheme of the battle in Russian
Date	13 November 1853
Location	Akhaltsikhe 41°38′36.35″N 42°59′36.40″E
Result	Russian victory

Belligerents
Russian Empire	Ottoman Empire

Commanders and leaders
Ivane Andronikashvili	Selim Pasha

Strength
7,000	18,000; 24 guns

Casualties and losses
362	3,500

The Battle of Akhaltsikhe (Russian: Ахалцихское сражение, Georgian: ახალციხის ბრძოლა) occurred on 13 November 1853 during the Crimean War when a Georgian-Russian force of 7,000 defeated a Turkish army of 18,000 men near the Akhaltsikhe fortress in the Caucasus.

At the outbreak of the Crimean War, Ali Pasha immediately launched a Turkish offensive to capture the Akhaltsikhe fortress. As the Ottoman force neared the city of Akhaltsikhe, the Turks were met by a Georgian-Russian detachment commanded by Ivane Andronikashvili.

Despite the numerical superiority of the Turkish forces led by Selim Pasha, Prince Andronnikov divided his cavalry into two columns and attacked. One of the Russian columns attacked the Turks head-on while the second column rode to the side and attacked their enemy in the left flank. After a fierce struggle, the Turks were beaten and retreated to Kars. The Russian force lost 361 men while the Turkish casualties amounted to 3,500 men killed, wounded, and captured.

The Battle of Akhaltsikhe was the first major Russian Imperial military success in the Caucasus theater of operations during the Crimean War. After this victory, the Turks ended their offensive actions in the South Caucasus.

== General references ==
Bogdanovich, M.I. (1876). Eastern War 1853-1856, Volume 1 (in Russian).
