= Benia Chkhikvishvili =

Georgian politician

- ბენია ჩხიკვიშვილი (Georgian)
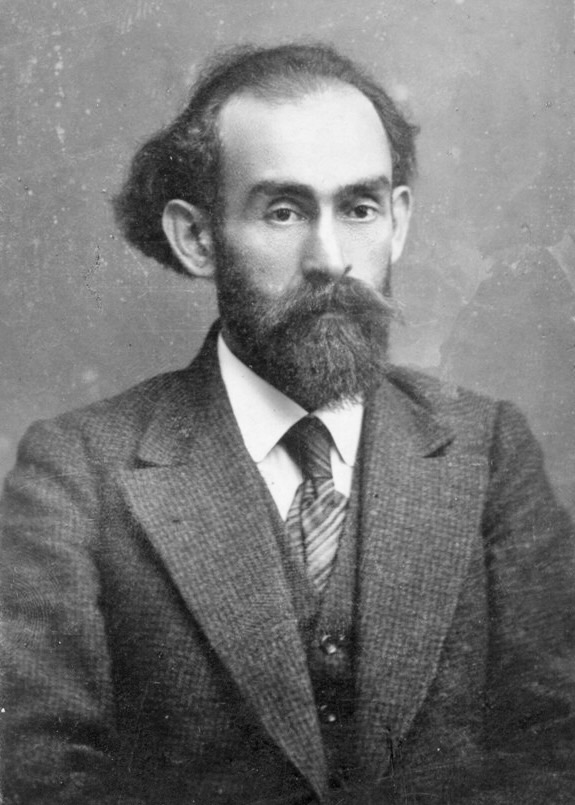

President of the Republic of Guria
- In office 1905–1906
- Preceded by: Post Created
- Succeeded by: Post Abolished

Personal details
- Born: 15 January 1880 Saskvavistke, Guria, Kutais Governorate, Russian Empire
- Died: 1924 (aged 42–43) Suzdal, Russian SFSR
- Party: Social Democratic Party of Georgia

Beniamin "Benia" Chkhikvishvili (also spelled Bénia Tchkhikvichvili, Georgian: ბენია ჩხიკვიშვილი; 1880–1924) was a Georgian politician who was involved in the Social Democratic movement in the early 20th century.

== Early political life ==
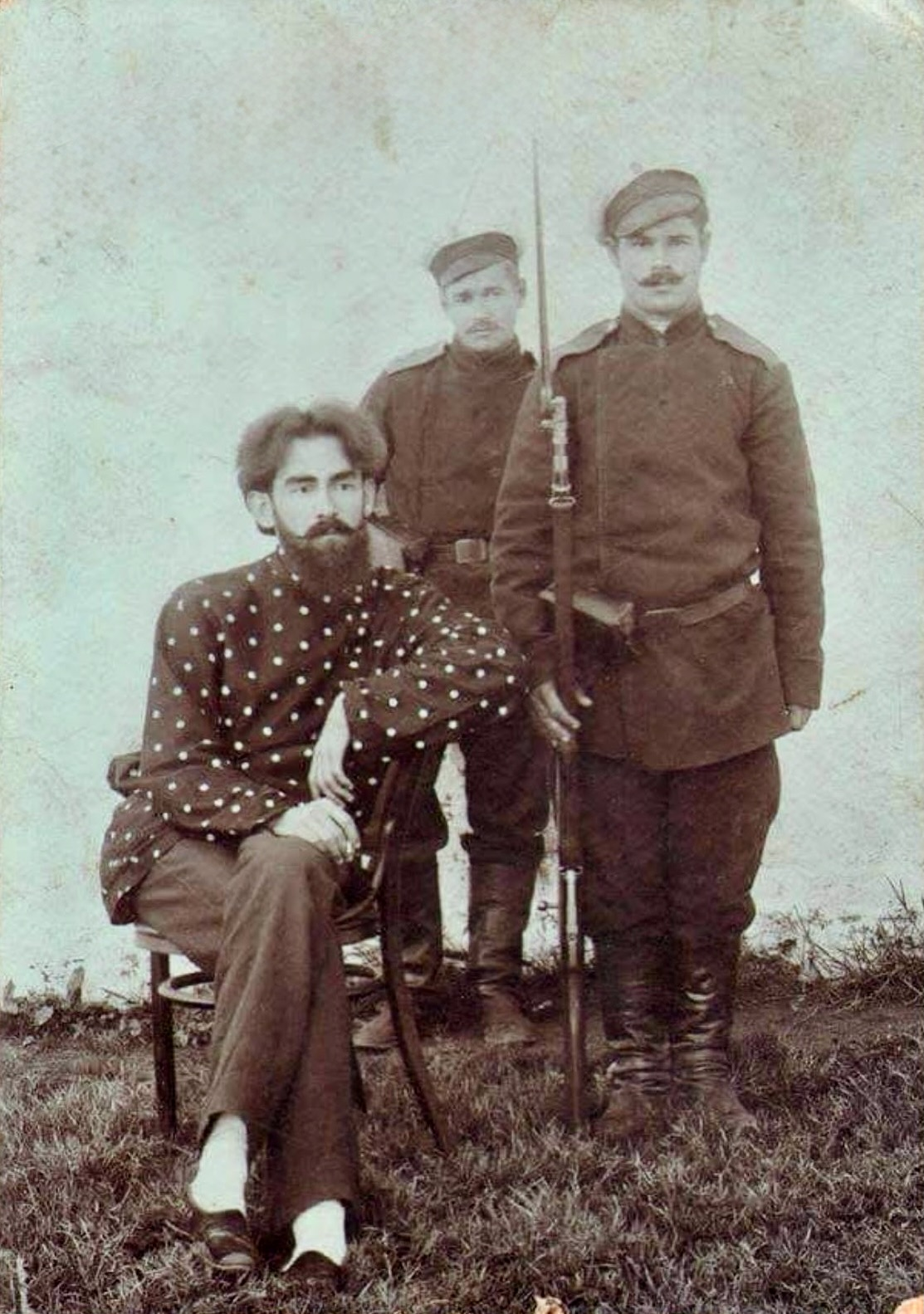
Benia, at the age of 27, posing with his Tsarist captors during his prison sentence, 1907

An active member of the Menshevik party, he led the 1905 revolution in Guria ("Gurian Republic"), a Georgian province on the Black Sea. He became a de facto head of the peasant government, sometimes described by the contemporary observers as a "Gurian president" or even "Gurian king". His participation in the Gurian uprising resulted in his imprisonment by the Russian Imperial authorities. During his prison sentence, he posed with his captors and sent the photograph to his sister. He is seated in a leisurely manner, wearing a polka dot shirt, while the soldiers stand guard behind.

During the short-lived independent Democratic Republic of Georgia, he served as a mayor of Tiflis, the capital of Georgia (1919–1920). After the Soviet invasion of Georgia, he immigrated to France, where he became an official owner of the Leuville chateau, a residence of the Georgian government-in-exile.

== Final years ==
In 1923, Benia returned from France to the now Soviet-occupied Georgia so that he could take part in the preparations for a general uprising against the Bolshevik regime. He was, however, arrested and executed.
