= Lanchkhuti Municipality =

Coordinates: 42.0944°N 42.0417°E

Lanchkhuti Municipality ლანჩხუთის მუნიციპალიტეტი
- Municipality
- View of Lanchkhuti, 2018

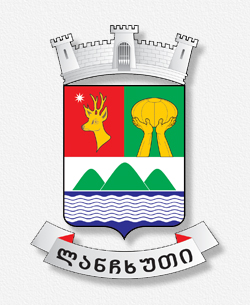
- Flag Seal

- Location of the municipality within Georgia
- Country: Georgia
- Region: Guria
- Capital: Lanchkhuti

Government
  - Mayor: Alexander Sarishvili (GD)

Area
  - Total: 533 km^{2} (206 sq mi)

Population (2014)
  - Total: 31,486
- Time zone: UTC+4 (Georgian Standard Time)
- Website: lanchkhuti.gov.ge

Lanchkhuti (Georgian: ლანჩხუთის მუნიციპალიტეტი, Lančxutis municip’alit’et’i) is a district of Georgia, in the region of Guria. Its main town is Lanchkhuti.

Lanchkhuti municipality is located in western Georgia, northwest of the Guria Mountains, bordered on the west by an 18 km (11 mi) Black Sea coast. The municipality occupies 15,000 hectares (37,000 acres) of the Kolkheti National Park, the purpose of which is to protect the flora and fauna in the Kolkheti lowlands, as well as to preserve nature intact. The villages of the mountainous zone are located 400 to 500 m (1,300 to 1,600 ft). At an altitude above sea level, the villages of the lowland zone are mainly bordered by Kolkheti National Park. Most of the municipality is a subtropical zone.

Lanchkhuti is 300 km (190 mi) away from Tbilisi, 85 km (53 mi) away from Batumi, 42 km (26 mi) away from Poti. There are two lakes in the municipality and five rivers with a total length of 75 km (47 mi), the municipality is known for many minerals, including: limestone deposits, clay, peat, Shukhuti rock-rich ore deposit, Supsa sand-gravel deposit. The total land fund of the municipality as of January 1, 2006 is 49860.9 ha, the largest part of which - 76% - is still owned by the state.

== Settlements ==
Rank	Settlement	Population
1	Lanchkhuti	6 395
2	Shukhuti	1 607
3	Nigoiti	615
4	Chanchati	499
5	Mamati	254

== Politics ==
Lanchkhuti Municipal Assembly (Georgian: ლანჩხუთის საკრებულო, Lanchkhuti Sakrebulo) is a representative body in Lanchkhuti Municipality, consisting of 27 members and elected every four years. The last election was held in October 2021.

Party	2017	2021	Current Municipal Assembly
Georgian Dream	27	20	
United National Movement	2	4	
For Georgia		2	
Lelo		1	
European Georgia	2		
Alliance of Patriots	1		
Total	32	27	

== Gallery ==
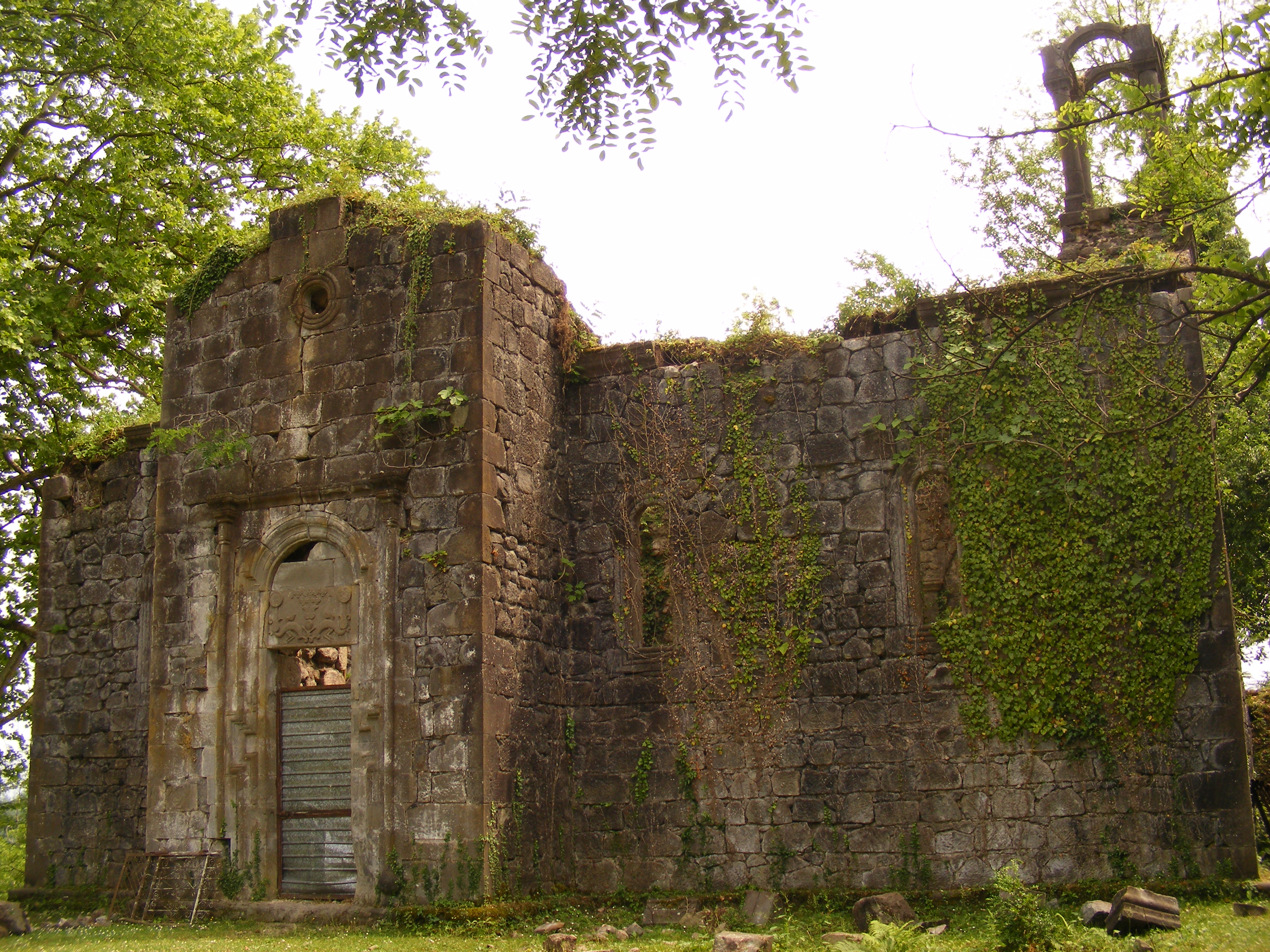
Aketi Saviour Church

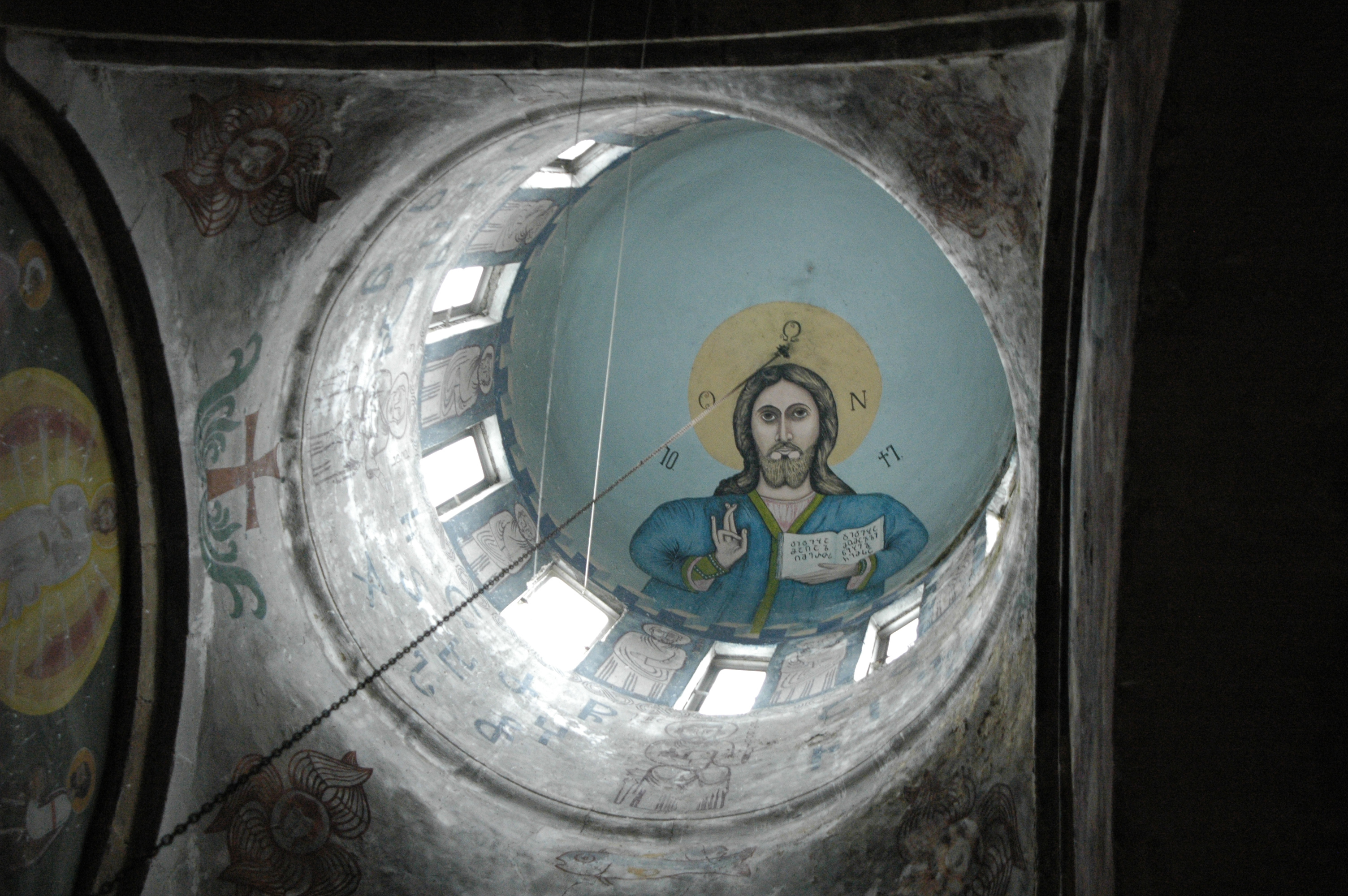
Sameba Jikheti monastery church

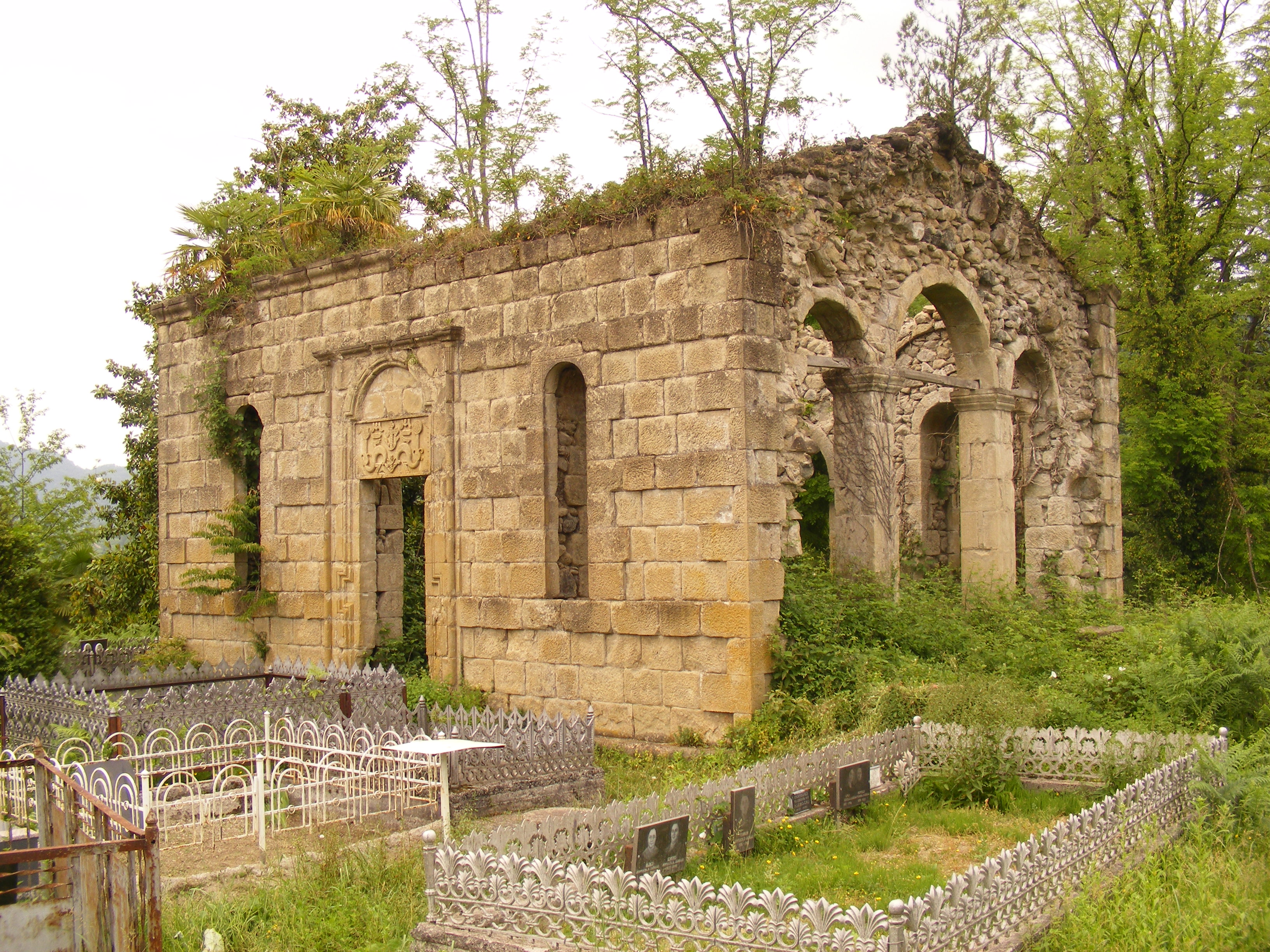
Church in Upper Aketi

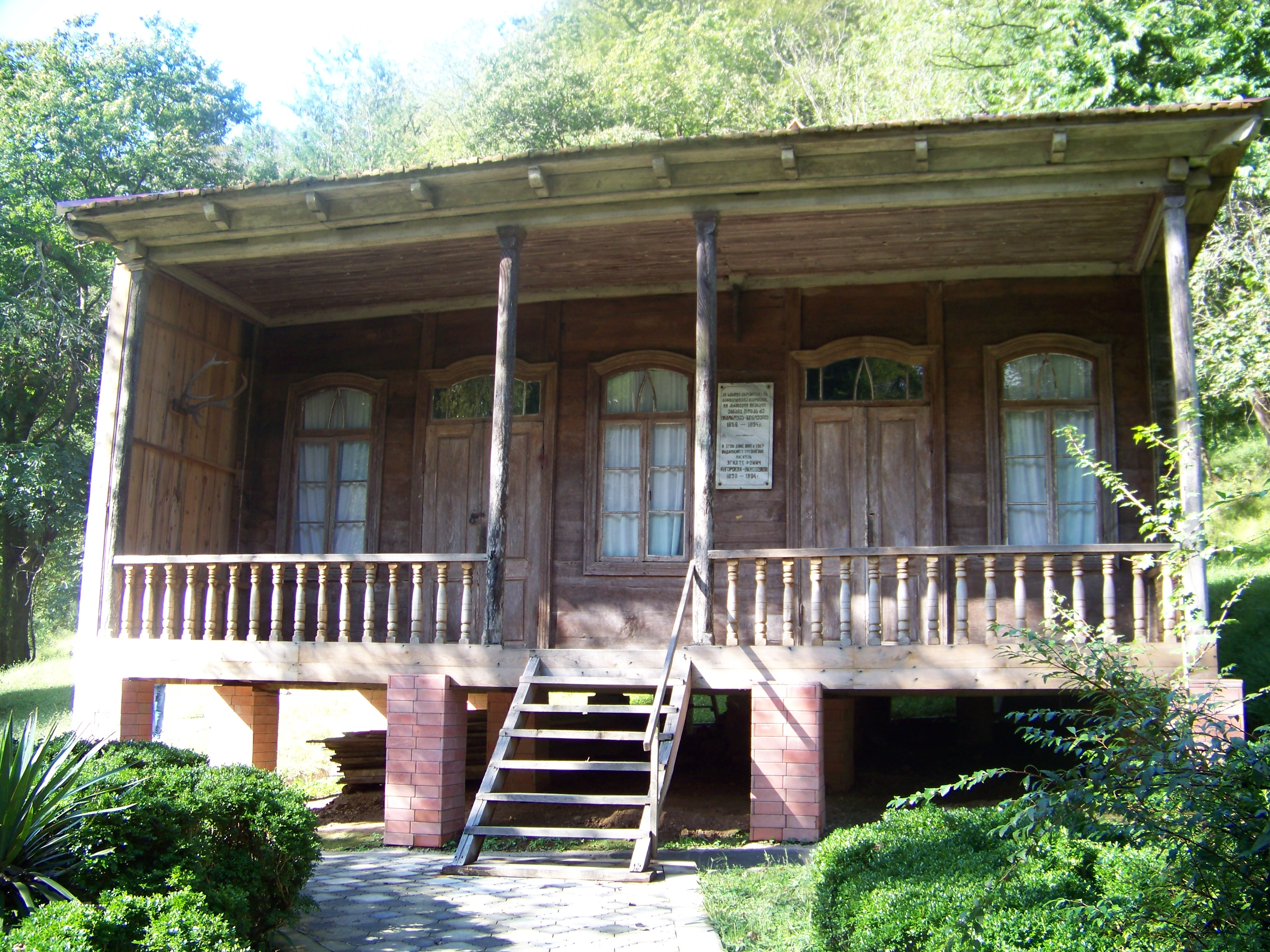
Museum of Egnate Ninoshvili

== See also ==
- List of municipalities in Georgia (country)
