= Hazards (magazine) =

Magazine published in the UK

- Hazards Issue 122, cover dated April–June 2013
- Editor: Rory O'Neill
- Categories: Occupational safety and health
- Frequency: Quarterly
- Founder: Charlie Clutterbuck; Alan Dalton; Tony Fletcher
- Founded: 1976
- First issue: January 1976
- Country: United Kingdom
- Based in: Sheffield
- Language: English
- Website: www.hazards.org
- ISSN: 0267-7296
- OCLC: 60801274

Hazards is an independent, award-winning occupational safety and health magazine. Published quarterly, it is the trade union recommended magazine for UK union health and safety representatives. Hazards has also jointly developed a NewsWire with LabourStart which provides health and safety news headlines for union websites as an RSS feed.

== History ==
Hazards was conceived in January 1976 as the Hazards Bulletin by Charlie Clutterbuck, Alan Dalton and Tony Fletcher - all members of the British Society for Social Responsibility in Science (BSSRS) - in response to the introduction of the Health and Safety at Work etc. Act 1974. The three had been involved in the production of the BSSRS magazine Science for People (SfP), which "provided brief coverage of topical science matters from a radical standpoint as well as reporting on the work of BSSRS", and increasingly found themselves addressing organised labour events on the subject of industrial hazards. Clutterbuck said later: "We recognised that there was a lot of different people becoming more interested in health and safety matters, because it was more "political". We saw health and safety at the very core of the crunch between capital and labour. We wanted those people to keep connected with each other and thought a magazine may help." The title of the magazine was inspired by the book The Hazards of Work: How to Fight Them (1974; Pluto Press) by Patrick Kinnersley.

Following publication of his book Asbestos: Killer Dust (1979; BSSRS) Dalton was successfully sued for libel in 1984 by Robert Murray, a former medical adviser to the Trades Union Congress. In the book Dalton had criticised Murray's pro-asbestos industry views and claimed that they were contrary to his position within the union movement. Although Murray was only awarded £500 damages, Dalton's legal costs of £30,000 bankrupted Hazards Bulletin. The magazine relaunched under the truncated title Hazards the same year.

== Recognition ==
Hazards is the winner of The Work Foundation Workworld Media Award 2007 and 2008 for online journalism. The judges commended the magazine for its "depth and seriousness, and its spiky determination to campaign for those at the rough end of working life." In 2008, US occupational safety magazine EHS Today named Hazards editor Rory O’Neill one of the 50 most influential health and safety leaders of the last decade. O'Neill is a professor of occupational and environmental policy research at the University of Liverpool and the occupational health and workplace safety adviser for the International Trade Union Confederation (ITUC), representing global unions on a number of UN panels.

== See also ==
- Safeguard (magazine)
- EHS Today
