= Chanchati =

Chanchati ჭანჭათი
- Village
- Location in Georgia Chanchati (Georgia)
- Coordinates: 42°01′50″N 42°07′10″E
- Country: (Georgia (country)) Georgia
- Region: Guria
- District: Lanchkhuti
- Elevation: 130 m (430 ft)

Population (2014)
  - Total: 499
- Time zone: UTC+4 (Georgian Time)

Chanchati (Georgian: ჭანჭათი) is a village in the Lanchkhuti Municipality of the Guria region, in western Republic of Georgia, with a population of 499 (2014).

== See also ==
- Guria
