= Kakuti =

Kakuti ქაქუთი
- Village
- Location within Georgia Location within Guria
- Coordinates: 41°51′15″N 41°58′15″E
- Country: Georgia
- Mkhare: Guria
- Municipality: Ozurgeti
- Elevation: 200 m (660 ft)

Population (2014)
  - Total: 282
- Time zone: UTC+4 (Georgian Time)

Kakuti (Georgian: ქაქუთი) is a village in the Ozurgeti Municipality of Guria in western Georgia.
