= LabourStart =

- Company type: Nonprofit
- Website type: News aggregator
- Available in: 27 languages
- Headquarters: London
- Country of origin: Canada
- Founder: Eric Lee
- Industry: Labour movement
- Services: RSS
- Website: www.labourstart.org
- Commercial: No
- Launched: March 1998; 28 years ago
- Current status: Active

LabourStart is the news and campaigning website of the international trade union movement. It distributes news both via its own website and also through a news syndication service (in both RSS and JavaScript formats) which is used by trade union websites around the world. There are newswires for specific languages, countries, regions, and some US states and every Canadian province. There are special newswires for online campaigns, women's labour news, and even a Health and Safety NewsWire run jointly with Hazards. The site has 638,000 unique visits per month as of February 2012.

News links are collected by a network of nearly 960 volunteer correspondents and appear in 27 languages.

== History ==
LabourStart was founded in March 1998 as part of the website launched in 1996 by Eric Lee in order to provide updates to his book, The Labour Movement and the Internet: The New Internationalism. The LabourStart website was initially hosted by Solinet, the website of the Canadian Union of Public Employees (CUPE) and its editor was based in Israel, on Kibbutz Ein Dor. In June 1998, Lee moved to London and the site has been based in Britain ever since.

From 1998 through 2002, LabourStart was a project of Labour and Society International (LSI), a non-governmental organisation based in London and initially headed up by Arthur Lipow, Stirling Smith and David Clement. At the end of 2002, LSI ceased functioning and LabourStart became entirely independent. At the same time, a number of LabourStart correspondents met up for the first time in London and have continued to meet online ever since. A number of correspondents have been named as Senior Correspondents and they, together with founding editor Lee, ran the project on a day by day basis until a recent re-organization.

In 2001 LabourStart expanded its news service to include news in other languages.

== Governance ==
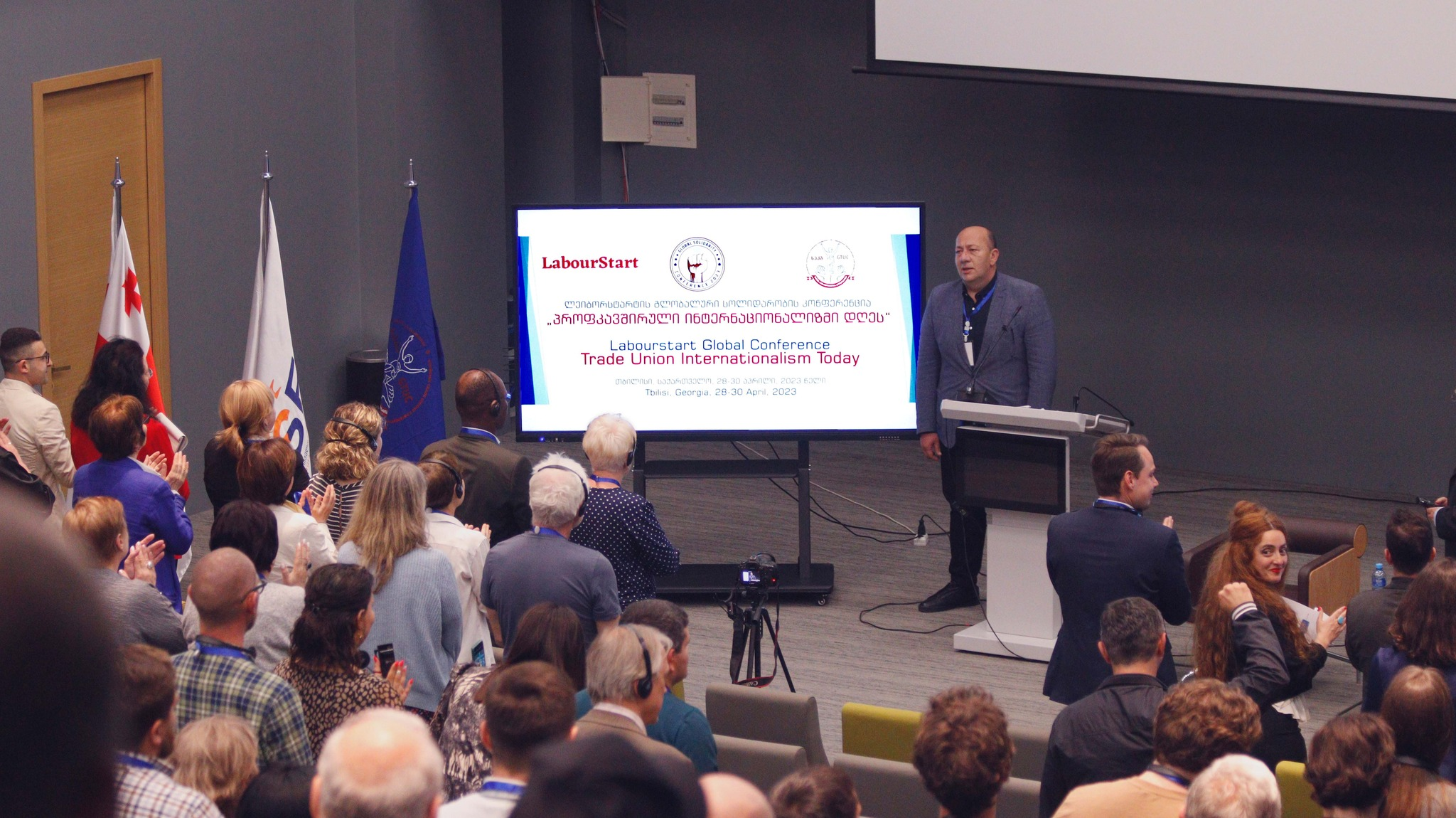
2023 LabourStart Solidarity Conference in Tbilisi, Georgia.

Until September 2015 LabourStart was administered informally by a self-selected group of Senior Correspondents. Generally these were people active in the labour movements of their home countries. The selection criteria were never formalized but most were full-time trade union officials, either appointed or elected. Efforts were made to select Senior Correspondents in order to expand LabourStart's footprint in various countries but these were mostly unsuccessful. Readership and campaigns participation remained largely confined to Europe, North America and Australia.

In order to address this ongoing problem and other structural issues an invitation-only retreat was held in September 2015 in Brussels. The retreat was meant to respond to complaints about a lack of transparency in regard to LabourStart's operations and finances, the chaotic nature of decision-making, the need to become a truly global organization, and the need for succession planning as many of the organization's volunteers, including its founder, are now in their late 50s or 60s.

The retreat resulted in the creation of an Executive Committee with formal decision-making authority and a number of issue-specific working groups. Steps were also taken to move toward equal gender representation within LabourStart's leadship but women remain in a minority.

== Campaign Work ==
Central to LabourStart's efforts are its multilingual mailing lists, which started with around 500 names in 1998 and within four years had grown more than sixfold to 3,227 names. Five years later, it had grown even more, and by June 2007 there were more than 53,000 subscribers to the weekly newsletter. By April 2012, there were just under 100,000 names on the lists. The mailing lists are used by LabourStart primarily to promote its online campaigns in support of workers' rights around the world.

As of November 2015 the various mailing lists are as follows:

- English: 85,588
- French: 8,325
- German: 5,785
- Spanish: 5,448
- Italian: 3,970
- Turkish: 3,719
- Korean: 3,068
- Norwegian: 2,782
- Russian: 2,433
- Dutch: 1,774
- Swedish: 1,256
- Chinese: 1,103
- Polish: 793
- Finnish: 687
- Japanese: 488
- Arabic: 463
- Portuguese: 416
- Indonesian: 346
- Hebrew: 282
- Tagalog: 254
- Farsi: 242

Social networks also play a role in LabourStart's news distribution and campaigning services. It has focussed its efforts on Facebook and Twitter and has a larger following than many national trade union centres.

Twitter followers:

- Global English: 15,395
- Canada English: 4,962
- Canada French: 876
- USA: 563
- Italian: 421
- Indonesia: 360
- Swedish: 306
- French: 229
- German: 90
- Spanish: 74
- Portuguese: 47
- Japanese: 21
- Russian: 18

Facebook Pages and Groups:

- Like LabourStart.org page (English): 10,177
- Members of LabourStart group: 8,611
- Like LabourStart page (French): 483
- Like LabourStart page (German): 447
- Like LabourStart page (Turkish): 169
- Like LabourStart page (Hebrew): 148
- Members of LabourStart Vostok [Russian]: 82

In recent years, LabourStart has conducted dozens of global online campaigns on behalf of unions. These campaigns have led in many cases to companies and governments being compelled to release jailed trade unionists, to negotiate with unions, and so on. Examples of recent LabourStart online campaigns call on the Egyptian government to overturn the jail sentence for Kamal Abbas and on the government of Iran to not execute jailed trade unionist and university teacher Abdolreza Ghanbari. These campaigns are initiatives of the International Trade Union Confederation and the Education International with which LabourStart has an ongoing partnership in promoting workers' rights through online campaigns.

LabourStart campaigns are sponsored or endorsed by a trade union or global union federation. LabourStart's campaign services are provided to unions at no charge.

It is not unknown for an online action mounted by LabourStart to exceed 20,000 participants within a week but the norm is around 10,000. Nation-specific campaigns may see as little as a few hundred participants or as many as 10,000, depending in part on the issue and on the population of the relevant country (Canada and the United Kingdom are the two most common single-country campaign sources).

== Global Solidarity Conferences ==
LabourStart holds annual Global Solidarity Conferences. Following small international meetings in London and Washington DC in 2008 and 2009, major events were held in Hamilton, Ontario in 2010, Istanbul in 2011, Sydney, Australia (2012), Berlin, Germany (2014) and Toronto, Canada (2016).

== UnionBook ==
In 2010 LabourStart launched UnionBook, a social network for trade unionists. It runs on the Ning platform. By March 2012 it had just over 5,000 members. By 2015 membership in UnionBook had stabilized at just over 6,000 and the site had become a forum for a small number of users with extreme or repetitive views. At a meeting of the LabourStart Executive Committee in Brussels in September 2015 the decision was made to offer the site as-is to any interested union or group of trade unionists. As of October 2015 references to LabourStart as the 'owner' of UnionBook were removed from the site. As of January 2016 there had been no offers to assume responsibility for the site and it appears likely that it will simply be shut down.

== Educational Activities ==
LabourStart volunteers regularly conduct workshops on the organizing potential of the new media for unions. These workshops are often organized at the request of a specific union or central labour body but LabourStart volunteers also often play key roles in organizing union-tech events such as the LabourTech conferences in Canada. It has also provided hands-on technical assistance to unions moving onto the 'net but the demand for this service has declined rapidly since most unions of any size are now well-established online. One of the first evaluations of the then-new Facebook for trade union organizing purposes was conducted by a team of LabourStart volunteers based in Canada and the UK in 2007, well before Facebook was widely known or popular outside university student circles.

== Controversies ==
LabourStart has been criticized by some in the digital labour movement including Walton Pantland of Cyberunions for continuing to rely on e-mail as the 'killer app' for online campaigning into the foreseeable future. These critics tend to see the e-mail-based tactics used by LabourStart as dated and not reflective of the move to smartphones as the primary devices for accessing the internet by trade unionists, especially in the global south. In response LabourStart has relied on its analyses of the weaknesses of alternative platforms, in particular the question of who owns or controls those alternative platforms.

As all of LabourStart global and national leadership figures are active within global, national or local trade unions they often take positions publicly. These are then sometimes attributed to LabourStart. Attempts are made by LabourStart to explain that it acts at the request of the existing structures of the global labour movement and that its volunteers are not subject to organizational discipline . But attacks on LabourStart, including calls for boycotts of the site and its campaigns , resulting from a position taken by one of its high-profile volunteers are regular if not frequent occurrences.

Similarly, disputes within and amongst LabourStart volunteers that reflect the differing positions of the unions and political factions from which they are drawn are regular occurrences. The Canadian and Dutch sections have, for example, clashed over whether a confessional trade union, one that is explicitly affiliated with an organized religion or church, can be considered a legitimate trade union. Issues like these are fundamental to what LabourStart does as the question of legitimacy determines whether a trade union is able to access LabourStart's services and whether persons affiliated with it may move into senior leadership positions within LabourStart.

LabourStart is regularly subject to criticism for its lack of a footprint in Latin America, large parts of Asia and sub-Saharan Africa outside South Africa.

== Reception ==
Other labour organisations and news sources treat LabourStart as a known and serious campaigning organisation. Thus ITFGlobal has "LabourStart appeal backs Estonian activist sacked for speaking out"; Solidarity Center has "LabourStart Campaign. Peruvian Union Leader Fired after Speaking out against Poor Working Conditions"; Workers' Liberty has "Forging global solidarity", a report on LabourStart's 2014 Berlin conference; similarly Red Pepper has "Labourstart Global Solidarity Conference opens this Friday in Berlin". The Labor Hall of Fame reports on a series of LabourStart activities. Trades Unions across the world likewise rely on LabourStart services and report on LabourStart campaigns, thus European Federation of Public Service Unions reports on "Labourstart campaign to support sacked workers Istanbul Hospital - please sign". The Canadian GoUnion has a "partners and allies" page about LabourStart with a history of the organisation. Industri all reports on LabourStart's campaign at Rio Tinto. Justice for Colombia has "LabourStart Launches Colombia Petition".

LabourStart received the prestigious Arthur Svensson International Prize for Trade Union Rights in 2016.

== See also ==
- Global Labour Institute
- Labour and Society International
