= Eristavi (family name) =

Eristavi (Georgian: ერისთავი) is a Georgian surname. Notable people with the surname include:

- Mary Eristavi (1888–1986), Georgian aristocrat and fashion icon
- Raphael Eristavi (1824–1901), Georgian poet and playwright
- Anastasia Eristavi (1868–1951), Georgian woman novelist
- Dominika Eristavi (1864–1929), Georgian writer and translator
- Valerian Sidamon-Eristavi (1889–1943), Georgian and designer
- Giorgi Eristavi (1813–1864), Georgian playwright, poet, journalist
