= Safeguard (magazine) =

New Zealand health and safety magazine

- Categories: Occupational safety and health
- Frequency: Bi-monthly
- Publisher: Thomson Reuters
- First issue: October 1988
- Country: New Zealand
- Website: www.safeguard.co.nz
- ISSN: 0113-9533

Safeguard is a New Zealand magazine devoted to occupational health and safety. It features articles and information on managing health and safety in the workplace and is aimed at employers in all industries and at health and safety professionals. The magazine was launched as a quarterly in 1988 by the Occupational Safety and Health Service (OSH) of the Department of Labour. It was subsequently taken over by a commercial company, Colour Workshop. Safeguard is now published bi-monthly by Thomson Reuters (Auckland).

== See also ==
- EHS Today
- Hazards (magazine)
- Safety+Health Magazine – National Safety Council
