= Nagomari =

Nagomari ნაგომარი
- Village
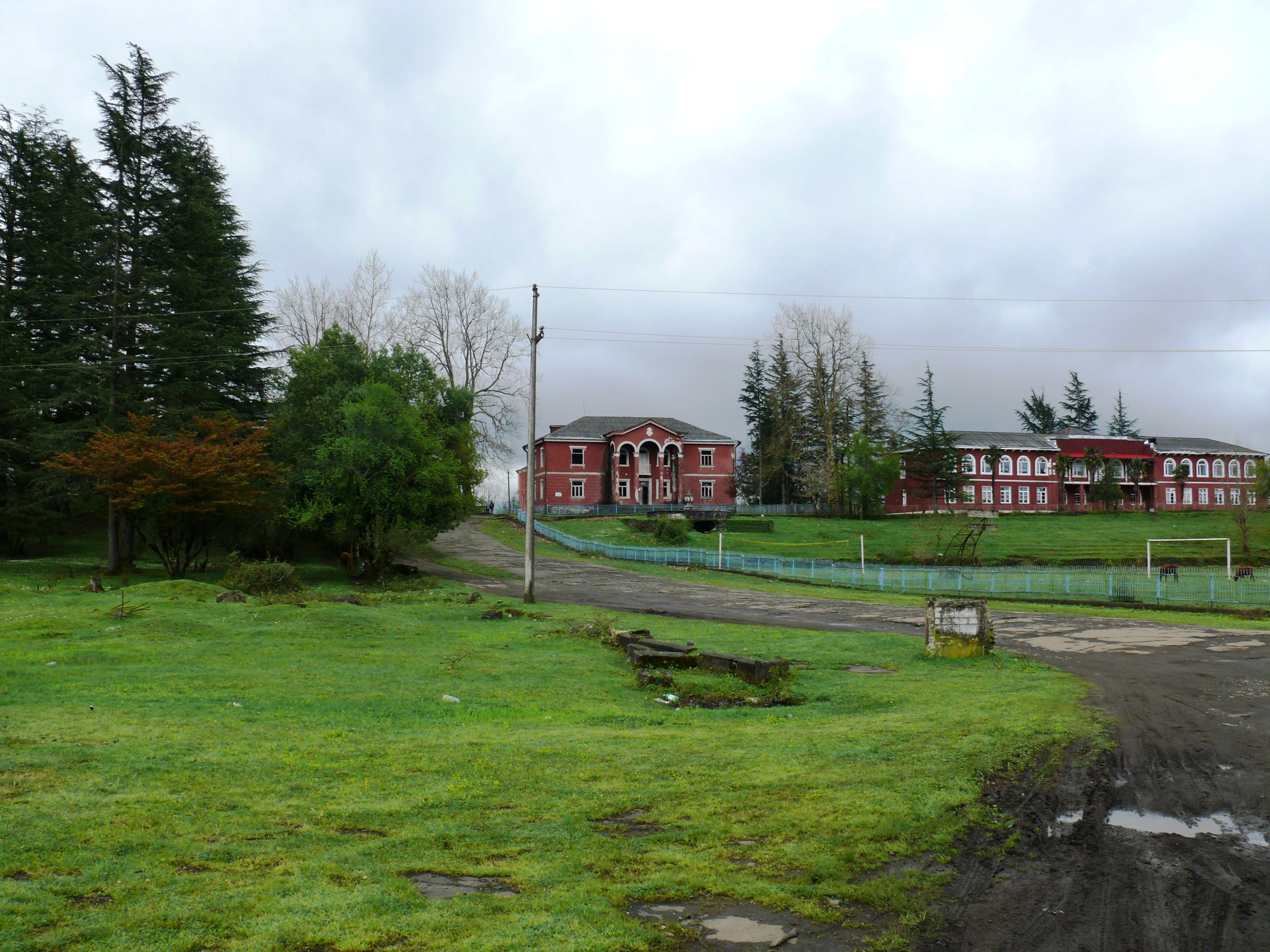

- Location within Georgia Location within Guria
- Coordinates: 41°59′52″N 42°06′54″E
- Country: Georgia
- Mkhare: Guria
- Municipality: Ozurgeti
- Elevation: 70 m (230 ft)

Population (2014)
  - Total: 365
- Time zone: UTC+4 (Georgian Time)

Nagomari (Georgian: ნაგომარი) is a village in the Ozurgeti Municipality of Guria in western Georgia.
