= Tengiz Zhghenti =

Georgian politician

- თენგიზ ჟღენტი (Georgian)

2nd Chairman of the Revolutionary Committee of Adjara
- In office 15 November 1921 – 10 January 1922
- Preceded by: Alexander Gambarov
- Succeeded by: Post Abolished

Personal details
- Born: 15 June 1887 Dablatsikhe, Guria, Kutais Governorate, Russian Empire
- Died: 24 May 1937 (aged 49)
- Party: Bolshevik

Tengiz Zhghenti (Georgian: თენგიზ ჟღენტი) (15 June 1887 – 24 May 1937) was a Georgian politician who served as the Second Chairman of the Revolutionary Committee of Adjara from 15 November 1921 to 10 January 1922. Born into an impoverished noble family in Guria, Zhghenti was an active member of the Bolsheviks in Georgia. In 1919 he served as the military commissioner of Odessa, and helped fight off revolts by the Musavats in Azerbaijan and Mensheviks in Georgia in the early 1920s. He killed himself on 24 May 1937.
