= Ivane Andronikashvili =

Russian general of Georgian origin (1798–1868)

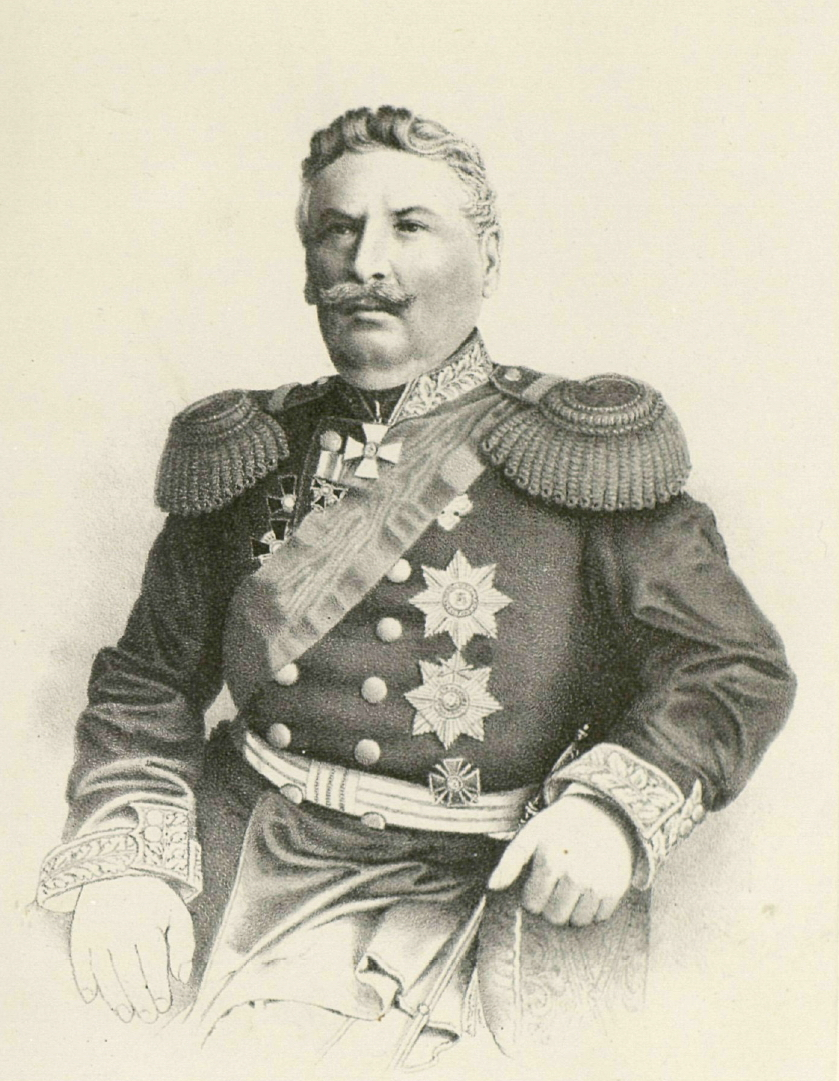
- Born: 1798; Kodalo, Kingdom of Kartli-Kakheti
- Died: November 19, 1868 (aged 69–70); Kodalo, Tiflis Governorate, Russian Empire
- Spouse: Nino Imeretinsky
- Military career
- Allegiance: Russia
- Branch: Imperial Russian Army
- Service years: 1824–1868
- Rank: General of the cavalry
- Unit: Leib Guard
- Commands: Several Dragoon regiments Governor-general of Tiflis; Several army corps
- Conflicts: Russo-Persian War; Russo-Turkish War; Caucasian War; Crimean War; Battle of Choloki; Battle of Akhaltsikhe

Prince Ivane Andronikashvili (Georgian: ივანე ანდრონიკაშვილი; Russian: Иван Малхазович Андронников, romanized: Ivan Malkhazovich Andronnikov; 1798 – November 19, 1868) was a Georgian nobleman who served as a general in the Russian Imperial Army. He reached the peak of his military career during the Crimean War, commanding an army of Georgian cavalrymen who defeated the much larger Turkish forces against all odds.

== Biography ==
He came from the Georgian noble family of Andronikashvili and was born in the village of Kodalo in the East Georgian Kingdom of Kartli-Kakheti, which three years after Andronikashvili's birth would be incorporated into the Russian Empire. His father was Prince Malkhaz Andronikashvili and mother Princess Mariam Bagrationi. His mother was the sister of Solomon II, the last monarch of the western Georgian Kingdom of Imereti. Andronikashvili himself was married to Princess Nino Imeretinsky, granddaughter of King David II of Imereti.

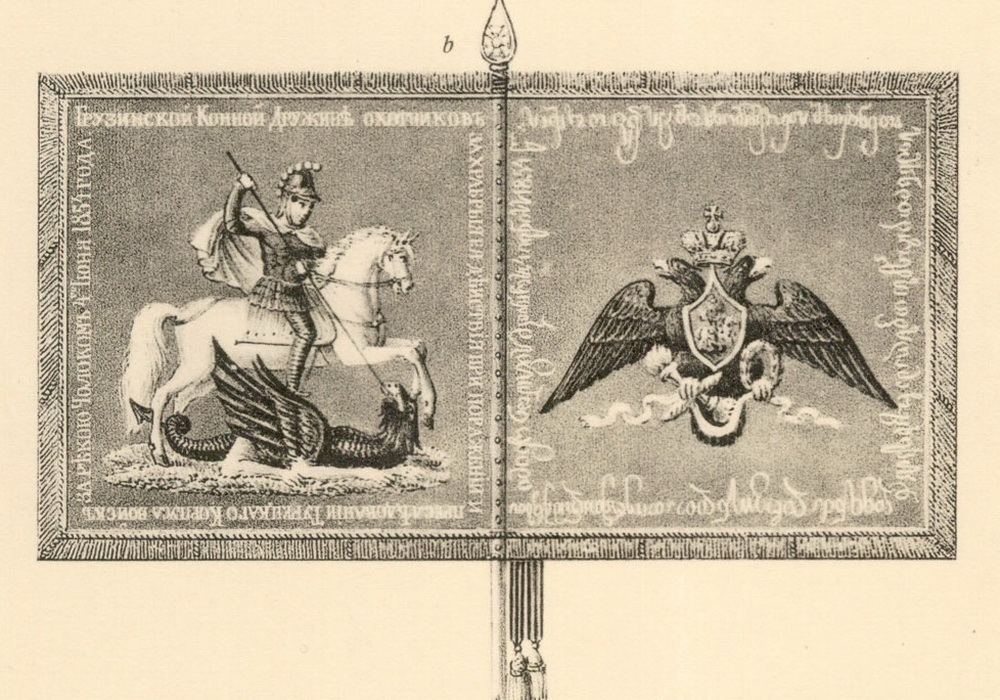
Bilingual Georgian-Russian military standard of 1855, commemorating the courage of Georgian cavalry in battle against the Turks at Choloki.

When Andronikashvili turned nineteen, he was enrolled in the St Petersburg Cavalry Regiment of the Leib Guard. Seven years later he was transferred to the Nizhny Novgorod cavalry regiment with the rank of major. When the Russo-Persian War broke out in 1826 Andronikashvili became heavily involved in many decisive battles. He served later in the Caucasus during the wars with Persia (1826–1829) and Turkey (1828–1829). He was promoted to the rank of major general in 1841 and then appointed as the governor general of Tiflis in 1849. He took part in the Caucasian War and led an expedition against the rebellious Ossetes in 1840 and 1850.

The Crimean War was the apex of Andronikashvili's military career. On November 14, 1853, he defeated Ali Pasha's army of 20,000 men at Akhaltsikhe with as few as 5,000 soldiers, mostly irregular Georgian cavalrymen. He achieved another victory against considerable odds over Selim Pasha's 36,000 troops at the Choloki River with the force of 13,000. Prince Andronikashvili was promoted to the rank of general of the cavalry just a few months before his death in 1868.

== Honours and awards ==
- Order of St. Vladimir, 4th class (1826),
- Order of St. Anna, 2nd class (1827)
- Order of St. George, 4th class (1830) and 3rd class (1853)
- Order of St. Stanislaus 1st class (1847)
- Order of St. Alexander Nevsky (1854)

== See also ==
- Andronikashvili
