= Labour and Society International =

- Abbreviation: LSI
- Formation: 1990s
- Dissolved: 2002–2003
- Type: NGO
- Purpose: Labour and society
- Location: United Kingdom
- Director: Stirling Smith
- Key people: Arthur Lipow and David Clement

Labour and Society International (LSI) was a non-governmental organization launched in the United Kingdom in the 1990s. Its founders were Arthur Lipow and David Clement. It ceased functioning in 2002–2003, and its last director was Stirling Smith. LSI co-sponsored a book series with Pluto Press, held conferences and published papers, and did work on projects with global union federations in developing countries. It also sponsored the LabourStart website for its first four years.
