= Sultan Krym-Girei =

Sultan Krym-Girei Султан Крым-Гирей
- Born: 21 November 1876; Tlyustenkhabl, Russian Empire
- Died: 28 March 1918 (aged 41) Kuban
- Allegiance: Russian Empire
- Branch: Imperial Russian Army
- Rank: Colonel
- Conflicts: Russo-Japanese War; World War I

Sultan Krym-Girei (Russian: Султан Крым-Гирей; 21 November 1876 – 28 March 1918) was an Imperial Russian military officer and a member of the former ruling family of the Crimean Khanate.

In 1905 he was asked by Illarion Vorontsov-Dashkov, newly appointed Viceroy of the Caucasus, to lead a delegation to negotiate with the Republic of Guria in modern Georgia.
