= EHS Today =

American trade magazine

- EHS Today, cover dated September 2012
- Editor-in-chief: Dave Blanchard
- Editor: Nicole Stempak
- Art Director: Bill Szilagyi
- Categories: Occupational safety and health
- Frequency: Monthly
- Publisher: Endeavor Business Media
- Founder: Irving B. Hexter
- Founded: 1938 (as Occupational Hazards and Safety)
- Country: United States
- Based in: Cleveland, Ohio
- Language: English
- Website: ehstoday.com
- ISSN: 0029-7909
- OCLC: 272377806

EHS Today is an American occupational safety and health magazine. Published monthly by Endeavor Business Media, it is the leading US magazine for environmental, health and safety management professionals in the manufacturing, construction, and service sectors.

== History ==
EHS Today was first published in 1938 as Occupational Hazards and Safety by Irving B. Hexter. Hexter, a Cleveland native and noted philanthropist, was a graduate of the University of Michigan. He began his business career as president of his brother's clothing business, the Morreau Hexter Co. He subsequently established his own greeting card company and in 1930 founded the Industrial Publishing Co. (IPC). The first magazine he published was a monthly periodical titled Here's How Its Welded (now called Welding Design & Fabrication.) By 1960 IPC was the 5th largest trade paper publisher in the United States, producing 13 publications with an aggregate monthly circulation of 510,000, and an annual gross advertising volume of US$5 million.

Launching the first issue, Hexter wrote: "Each stride of modern industry towards faster, better manufacture of old products, or towards development of new ones, has created additional health and accident hazards" and the magazine set out to raise awareness of the safety and health hazards – and the resulting loss of productivity – resulting from the implementation of the latest industrial processes. The name of the magazine was subsequently truncated to Occupational Hazards.

Following Hexter's death, IPC merged with Penton Publishing Co. to form Penton/IPC. In April 1998, the company changed its name to Penton Media. Penton continued publication of Occupational Hazards until 2008, when the title was rebranded as EHS Today. Sandy Smith, editor-in-chief, explained: "EHS Today was created for the EHS manager of the 21st century - one who can't be satisfied with an information silo but needs a comprehensive source of news and knowledge that is easily accessible in print or online. EHS Today builds on Occupational Hazards' 70-year tradition of editorial excellence, but redefines the mission to serve today's multi-tasking, technologically savvy reader operating in a global economy. It's a 'clean sheet' magazine built on more than seven decades of intimate experience with the EHS profession."

In 2016, Penton was acquired by Informa. In 2019, Informa sold its manufacturing division, including EHS Today, to Endeavor Business Media.

== See also ==
- Hazards (magazine)
- Safeguard (magazine)
- National Institute for Occupational Safety and Health
- Occupational Safety and Health Administration
- Total Worker Health
