= Nigoiti =

Nigoiti ნიგოითი
- Location within Guria Location within Georgia
- Coordinates: 42°04′59″N 42°06′29″E
- Country: Georgia
- Mkhare: Guria
- District: Lanchkhuti
- Elevation: 40 m (130 ft)

Population (2014)
  - Total: 615
- Time zone: UTC+4 (Georgian Time)

Nigoiti (Georgian: ნიგოითი) is a village in the Lanchkhuti Municipality of Guria in western Georgia with a population of 615 as of 2014. In 1854, during the Crimean War, the Battle of Nigoiti was fought nearby between the Ottoman Empire and Russian Empire.
