= The Slavonic and East European Review =

Peer-reviewed Slavist and East European studies journal

- Discipline: Slavic studies, East European Studies
- Language: English

Publication details
- Former name: The Slavonic Review
- History: 1922–present
- Publisher: Modern Humanities Research Association
- Frequency: Quarterly

Standard abbreviations
- ISO 4: Slavon. East Eur. Rev.

Indexing
- ISSN: 0037-6795 (print); 2222-4327 (web)
- LCCN: sn94096267
- JSTOR: 00376795
- OCLC no.: 1099125967

Links
- Journal homepage

The Slavonic and East European Review (SEER), the journal of the UCL School of Slavonic and East European Studies (University College London), is a quarterly peer-reviewed academic journal covering Slavonic and East European Studies. It was established in 1922 by Bernard Pares, Robert Seton-Watson, and Harold Williams and published by the Modern Humanities Research Association.
