= List of museums in Georgia (country) =

Museums in Georgia listed by the principal subdivisions of the country.

Key

Science Museum (Physics)
Geology (Earth Science)
Natural (Life Science)
Aquarium (Marine Science)
Ecological
Archaeological
(Human Artifacts)
Industrial

Art Museum
Cultural
Historic Site
History (General)
Military History
Religious
Commodity Collection
Children's Museum

Aerospace (Planes & Rockets)
Railway (Trains)
Maritime (Boats & Sea)
Automobile
Library
Biographical
Hall of Fame
Defunct

== Adjara ==
Adjara State Museum

Adjara State Museum of Fine Art

Kemal Turmanidze's Ethnographic Museum "Borjgalo"

Batumi Archaeology Museum

Ilia Chavchavadze Museum

Memed Abashidze House Museum

Joseph Stalin House Museum

Khelvachauri Local Museum

Machakheli Valley Ethnography Museum

Gonio-Apsaros Museum-Reserve

Khulo Local Museum

Adjaristskali Art Gallery

Sherip Khimshiashvili House Museum

Khikhani Valley Ethnography Museum

Oladauri Ethnography Museum

Petra-Tsikhisdziri Historical-Architectural Museum-Reserve

== Imereti ==
Niko Berdzenishvili Kutaisi History Museum (web)

Kutaisi Sport History Museum

Kutaisi Museum of Zakaria Paliashvili

Kutaisi Museum of Military Glory

Kutaisi Fine Art Gallery

Kutaisi-Gelati State Museum-Reserve

Niko Nikoladze House Museum

Samtredia Picture Gallery

Akaki Shanidze House Museum

Khoni Local Museum

Polikarpe Kakabadze House-Museum

Irakli Abashidze House Museum

Giorgi Akhvlediani Tskaltubo Local Museum

Niko Lortkipanidze House Museum

Tskaltubo Fine Art Museum

Vani Fine Art Museum

Galaktion and Titsian Tabidze House Museum

Georgian National Museum. Vani Archaeological Museum

Chiatura Local Museum

Giorgi Tsereteli House Museum

Mountain-climber Japaridze House Museum

Tkibuli Local Museum

Vladimir Mayakovsky House Museum

Chkhari Agriculture and Craft Museum

David and Sergo Kldiashvili House Museum

Shalva and Petre Amiranashvili House Museum

Zestaponi Local Museum

Ushangi Chkheidze House Museum

Kharagauli Local Museum

Ghoresha Museum of the Village History

Sachkhere Local Museum

Akaki Tsereteli State Museum

== Guria ==
Ozurgeti History Museum

Ozurgeti Fine Art Gallery

Ekvtime Takaishvili Museum-Reserve of Gurianta-Vashnari

Lanchkhuti Local Museum

Egnate Ninoshvili House Museum

Niko Berdzenishvili Local Museum of Chokhatauri

Nodar Dumbadze House Museum

Nicholas Marr House Museum

== Kakheti ==
Napareuli Qvevri and Qvevri Wine Museum in Twins Wine Cellar

Napareuli Qvevri and Qvevri Wine Museum

Sagarejo Local Museum

Giorgi Leonidze House Museum

David Gareja Historical-Architectural Museum-Reserve

Gurjaani Local Museum

Nato Vachnadze House Museum

Ioseb Noneshvili House Museum

Ivane Beritashvili House Museum

Museum of Military Glory

Giorgi Maisuradze Museum of Village History

Shalikashvili Brothers Museum of Georgian Army

Giorgi Chubinashvili Telavi State History and Ethnography Museum

Alexander Chavchavadze House Museum at Tsinandali

Akhmeta Local Museum

Raphael Eristavi House Museum

Omalo Ethnographic Museum

Signagi Museum

Vano Sarajishvili House Museum

Pore Mosulishvili House Museum

Irodion Evdoshvili House Museum

Sandro Akhmeteli House Museum

Vaso Godziashvili House Museum

Sandro Shanshiashvili House Museum

Ilo Mosashvili House Museum

Alexandre Gzirishvili House Museum

Sandro Mirianashvili House Museum

Dedoplistskaro Local Museum

State Museum of Niko Pirosmanashvili at Mirzaani

Museum of Friendship of Nations

Kote Marjanishvili House Museum

Ilia Chavchavadze House Museum

Gremi-Nekresi History and Architecture State Museum-Reserve

Lagodekhi Local Museum

== Kvemo Kartli ==
Rustavi Local Museum

Gardabani Local Museum

Martkopi History Museum

Norio History Museum

Nicholas Marr Memorial Museum

Nikoloz Baratashvili House Museum

Mikheil Javakhishvili House Museum

Melik-Phashayev House Museum

Tetritskaro Local Museum

Bolnisi Local Museum

Sulkhan-Saba Orbeliani Museum (Village Tandzia)

Kldekari History and Architecture Museum-Reserve

Georgian National Museum. Dmanisi History and Architecture Museum-Reserve

== Mtskheta-Mtianeti ==
Ilia Chavchavadze Saguramo State Museum

Great Mtskheta Archaeology State Museum-Reserve

Dusheti Local Museum

Gudani Ethnography Museum

Giorgi and David Eristavi House Museum

Vazha-Pshavela House Museum

Dartlo Architectural Reserve

Tianeti Local Museum

Mirza Gelovani House Museum

Kazbegi Museum

Alexander Kazbegi Stepantsminda Local Museum

== Shida Kartli ==
Khashuri Local Museum

Dimitri Kipiani House-Museum

Kareli Local Museum

Sergi Makalatia Gori History and Ethnography Museum

Alexander Javakhishvili House Museum (village Dzevera)

Niko Lomouri House Museum (village Arbo)

Joseph Stalin Museum in Gori

Iakob Gogebashvili House Museum

Uplistsikhe History and Architecture Museum-Reserve

Ivane Machabeli House Museum

Didi Liakhvi Gorge Museum-Reserve

Kaspi Local Museum

Jambakur-Orbeliani Palaces

Ivane Javakhisvili House Museum

Giorgi Mazniashvili House Museum

Omar Kelaptrishvili House Museum

Ksani Gorge Archaeology Museum-Reserve

== Samtskhe-Javakheti ==
Georgian National Museum. Samtskhe-Javakheti History Museum

Vardzia History and Architecture State Museum-Reserve

Akhalkalaki Local Museum

Akhaltsikhe Museum Local Museum

Borjomi Local Museum

Vahan Terian House Museum

== Racha-Lechkhumi and Kvemo Svaneti ==
Lentekhi Local Museum

Tsageri Local Museum

Lado Asatiani House Museum

Tsageri Picture gallery

Racha Regional Museum in Oni

Ambrolauri Museum of Fine Arts

== Samegrelo-Zemo Svaneti ==
Mikheil Khergiani House Museum

Georgian National Museum. Svaneti History and Ethnography Museum

Dadiani Palace History and Architecture Museum

Tsalenjikha History and Ethnography Museum

Terenti Graneli House Museum

Chkhorotsku Local Museum

Khobi Local Museum

Alio Mirtskhulava House Museum

Poti Colchian Culture Museum

Senaki Museum

Nokalakevi Archaeology Museum-Reserve

Arnold Chikobava Memorial Museum

Senaki Picture Gallery

Konstantine Gamsakhurdia House Museum

Martvili Local Museum
