= List of museums in Tbilisi =

The list of the museums in Tbilisi, capital and the largest city of Georgia.

- Science, medicine
- Geology (Earth Science)
- Natural (Life Science)
- Aquarium (Marine Science)
- Ecological
- Archaeological
- (Human Artifacts)
- Industrial
- Art Museum
- Cultural
- Historic Site
- History (General)
- Military History
- Religious
- Commodity Collection
- Children's Museum
- Aerospace (Planes & Rockets)
- Railway (Trains)
- Maritime (Boats & Sea)
- Automobile
- Library
- Biographical
- Hall of Fame
- Defunct

== Main ==
- Georgian National Museum. Simon Janashia Museum of Georgia
- Georgian National Museum. Shalva Amiranashvili Museum of Fine Arts
- Georgian National Museum. Ioseb Grishashvili Tbilisi History Museum (Caravanserai)
- Georgian National Museum. Open Air Museum of Ethnography, Tbilisi
- Georgian National Museum. Museum of Soviet Occupation
- Georgian National Museum. Elene Akhvlediani House Museum
- Georgian National Museum. Mose Toidze House Museum
- Georgian National Museum. Iakob Nikoladze House Museum
- Georgian National Museum. Ucha Japaridze House Museum
- Georgian National Museum. Institute of Palaeobiology
- Giorgi Leonidze State Museum of Georgian Literature

== Branches ==
- Titsian Tabidze House Museum
- Nodar Dumbadze House Museum
- Georgian State Museum of Theatre, Music, Cinema and Choreography
- Georgian State Museum of Folk and Applied Art
- Georgian National Gallery
- Tbilisi Archaeological Museum
- State Museum of Georgian Folk Songs and Musical Instruments
- State Silk Museum
- Money Museum
- David Baazov Museum of History of Jews of Georgia
- "Animal World" – Nature Museum
- Cinema History Museum
- Puppet Museum
- Museum of Georgian Medicine
- Museum of Tbilisi National Opera and Ballet Theatre
- Museum of Rustaveli Theatre
- Museum of Marjanishvili Theatre
- Museum of Tbilisi State Academy of Fine Arts
- Tapestry Museum of Tbilisi State Academy of Fine Arts
- Tbilisi Classic Gymnasium History Museum
- Museum of Sports
- "Tbilisi Pharmacy#1" Museum
- Museum of Aeronautics and Aviation
- Museum of Railway History
- Ilia Chavchavadze Literature-Memorial Museum
- Niko Pirosmanashvili Museum (Branch of the Niko Pirosmanashvili Museum in Mirzaani)
- Merab Kostava House Museum
- Zakaria Paliashvili House Museum
- Smirnov's House – Caucasian House
- Vakhtang Chabukiani House Museum
- Nikoloz Baratashvili House Museum
- Galaktion Tabidze House Museum
- Nikoloz Ignatov House Museum
- Otar Taktakishvili House Museum
- Natela Iankoshvili House Museum
- Veriko Anjaparidze and Mikheil Chiaureli Museum
- Soso Tsereteli House Museum
- Gedevanishvili Family Memorial Museum
- Mikheil Javakhishvili House Museum
- Ioseb Grishashvili Library-Museum
- Dendrology Museum (Tbilisi Botanical Garden)
- Animated Puppet Museum
- Museum of Tbilisi State Conservatory
- Tbilisi State University History Museum
- Georgian Émigré Museum at Tbilisi State University
- Museum of History of Georgian Geophysical Sciences
- Museum of Minerals
- Museum of Communications
- Georgian Olympic Museum
- Georgian Museum of Photography
- Revaz Lagidze Museum
- Ushangi Chkheidze House Museum
- Akaki Vasadze House Museum
- "Avlabar Illegal Typography" Museum
- Mirza Fatali Akhundov Museum of Georgian-Azerbaijani Cultural Relations
- Georgian National Center of Manuscripts

== See also ==
- List of museums in Georgia

Museum of Selfies Georgia Museum of Illusion
