= Museum of the Occupation =

Museum of the Occupation

- Museum of the Occupation of Latvia
- Museum of Occupations, Tallinn
- Museum of Soviet Occupation (Tbilisi)
- Museum of Soviet Occupation, Kyiv
