= List of museums in Georgia =

List of museums in Georgia may refer to:

- List of museums in Georgia (country)
- List of museums in Georgia (U.S. state)
