= Ozurgeti History Museum =

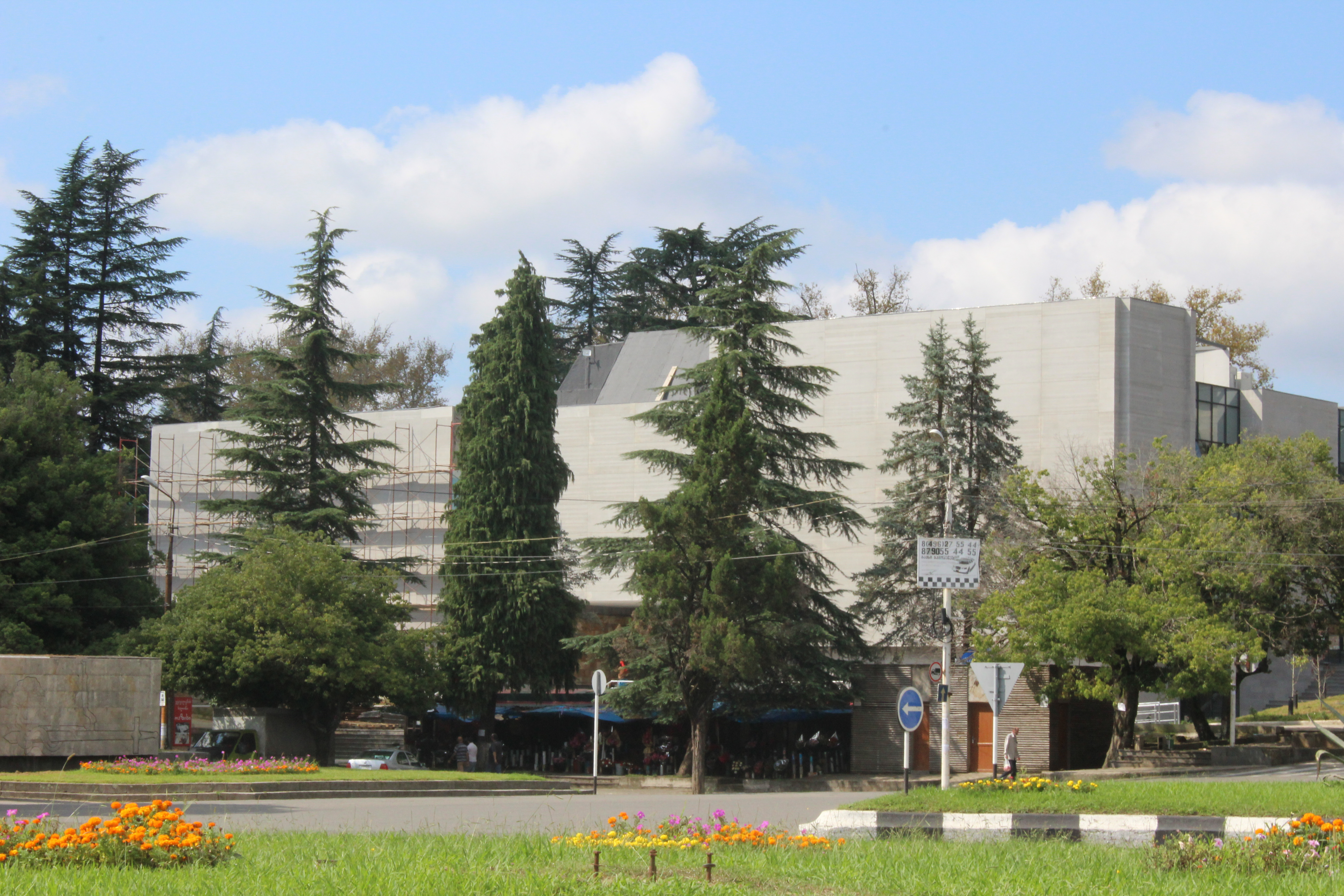
- Ozurgeti History Museum
- Established: 1936
- Location: Ozurgeti, Guria, Georgia
- Type: historical museum, ethnographic museum
- Director: Goga Trapaidze

The Ozurgeti History Museum is a historical-ethnographic museum located in Ozurgeti. It is the biggest museum in the Guria region.

== History ==
The museum was founded on 1 April 1936. Its first director was Nicholas Samsonia. In the years 1974-91 museum was situated in Gurieli Palace building (today bishop residency).

== Exhibition ==
The museum hosts collections from Neolithic Age, unique examples of Early, Middle and Late Bronze Age Colkhian culture, burial ground stocks from Iron Age, ancient silver and golden items, numismatic (golden coin of Alexander the Great, Colkhian silver coins, Turkish coins, unique European silver coins), ethnographic (19th century working and living objects, fine art), archival books of historical value. Nowadays museum collections consists of more than 6000 exhibits, dated from the 9th millennium BC until today, including Napoleon Bonaparte`s rapier.

Museum is open daily 10:00-18:00. Entry is free.

== Structure ==
In 2007 museum was established by the local self-government as the non-commercial legal entity. Currently it has three branches - Ethnographic Museum in Dvabzu, Memorial Museum in Gurianta and Ekvtime Takaishvili Archaeological Museum in Likhauri.
