= Georgian National Museum =

Unified national museum in Tbilisi, Georgia

- საქართველოს ეროვნული მუზეუმი
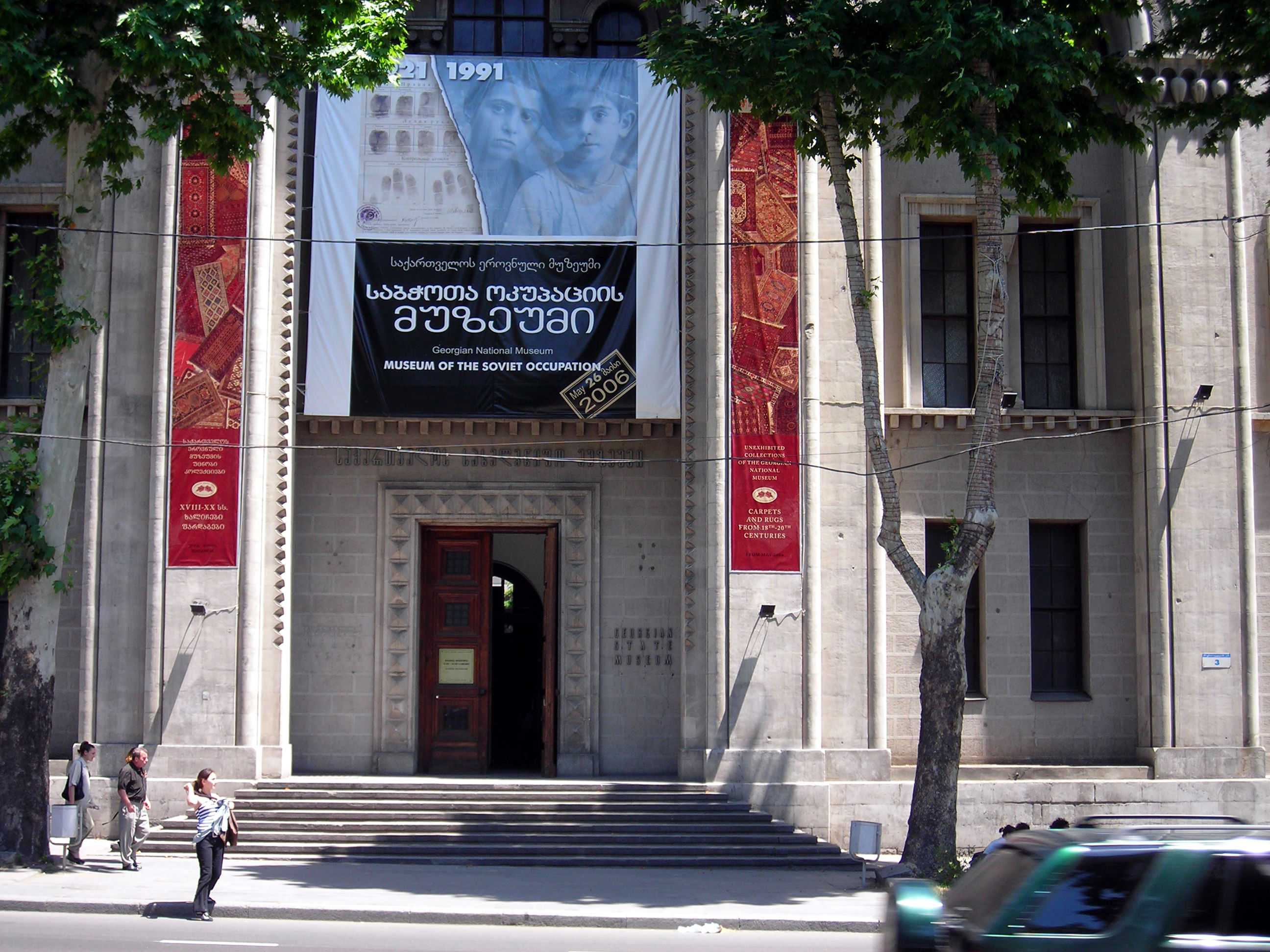
- Established: 2004
- Location: Georgia
- Website: https://museum.ge/index.php?m=2&lng=eng

The Georgian National Museum (Georgian: საქართველოს ეროვნული მუზეუმი, romanized: sakartvelos erovnuli muzeumi) unifies several leading museums in Georgia. The museum was established within the framework of structural, institutional, and legal reforms aimed at modernizing the management of the institutions united within this network, and at coordinating research and educational activities. Since its formation on December 30, 2004, the Museum has been directed by professor David Lordkipanidze.

The Georgian National Museum integrates the management of the following museums:

- Simon Janashia Museum of Georgia, Tbilisi
- Samtskhe-Javakheti History Museum, Akhaltsikhe
- Open Air Museum of Ethnography, Tbilisi
- Art Museum of Georgia, Tbilisi, and its branches
- Museum of the Soviet Occupation, Tbilisi
- Dmanisi Museum-Reserve of History and Archaeology, Dmanisi
- Vani Museum-Reserve of Archaeology, Vani
- Museum of History of Tbilisi, Tbilisi
- Museum of History and Ethnography of Svaneti, Mestia
- Institute of Palaeobiology, Tbilisi
- Sighnaghi Museum, Sighnaghi
- Bolnisi Museum, Bolnisi

== See also ==
- List of museums in Tbilisi
- List of museums in Georgia
