= Ozurgeti =

Ozurgeti ოზურგეთი
- City
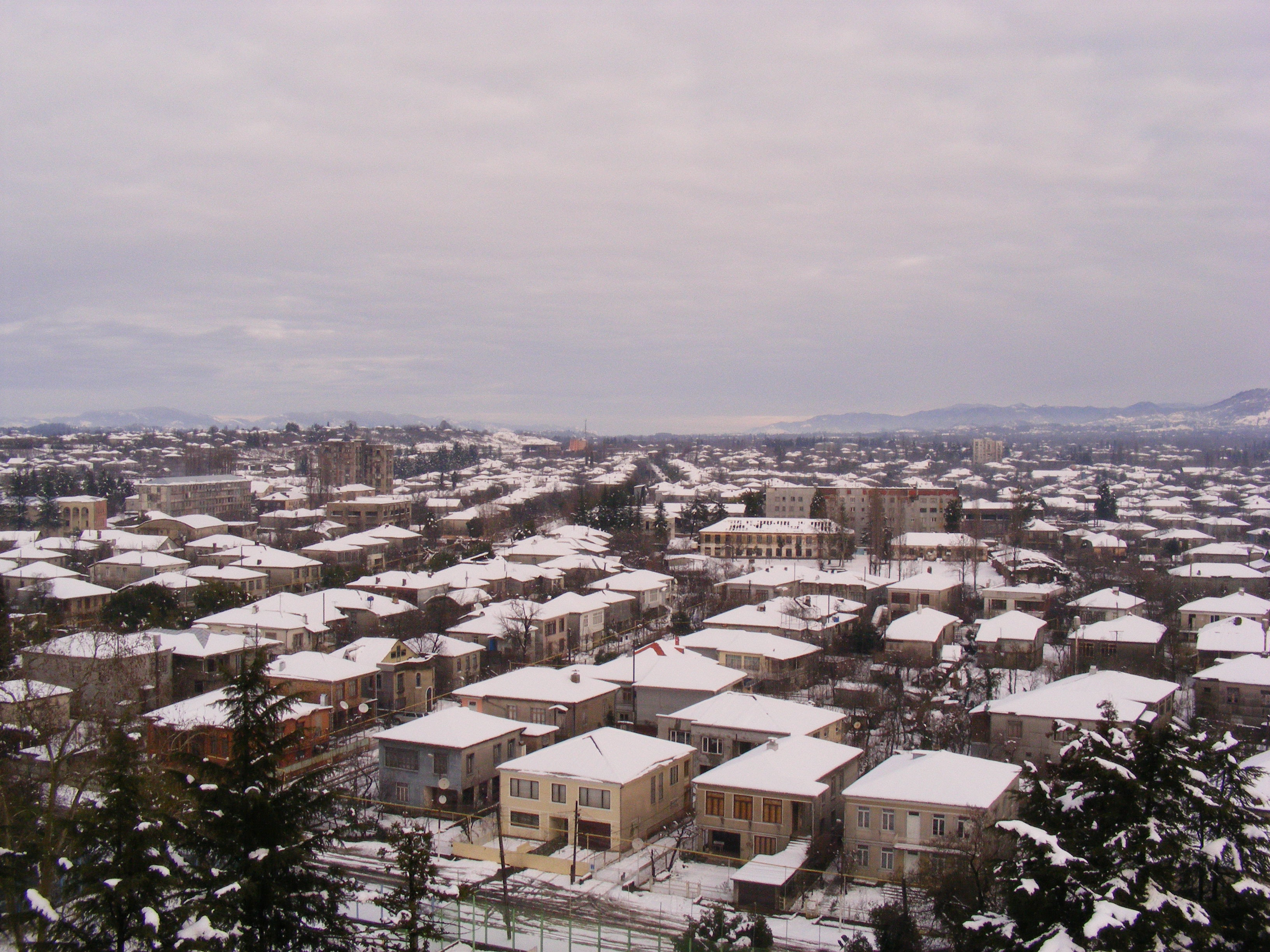
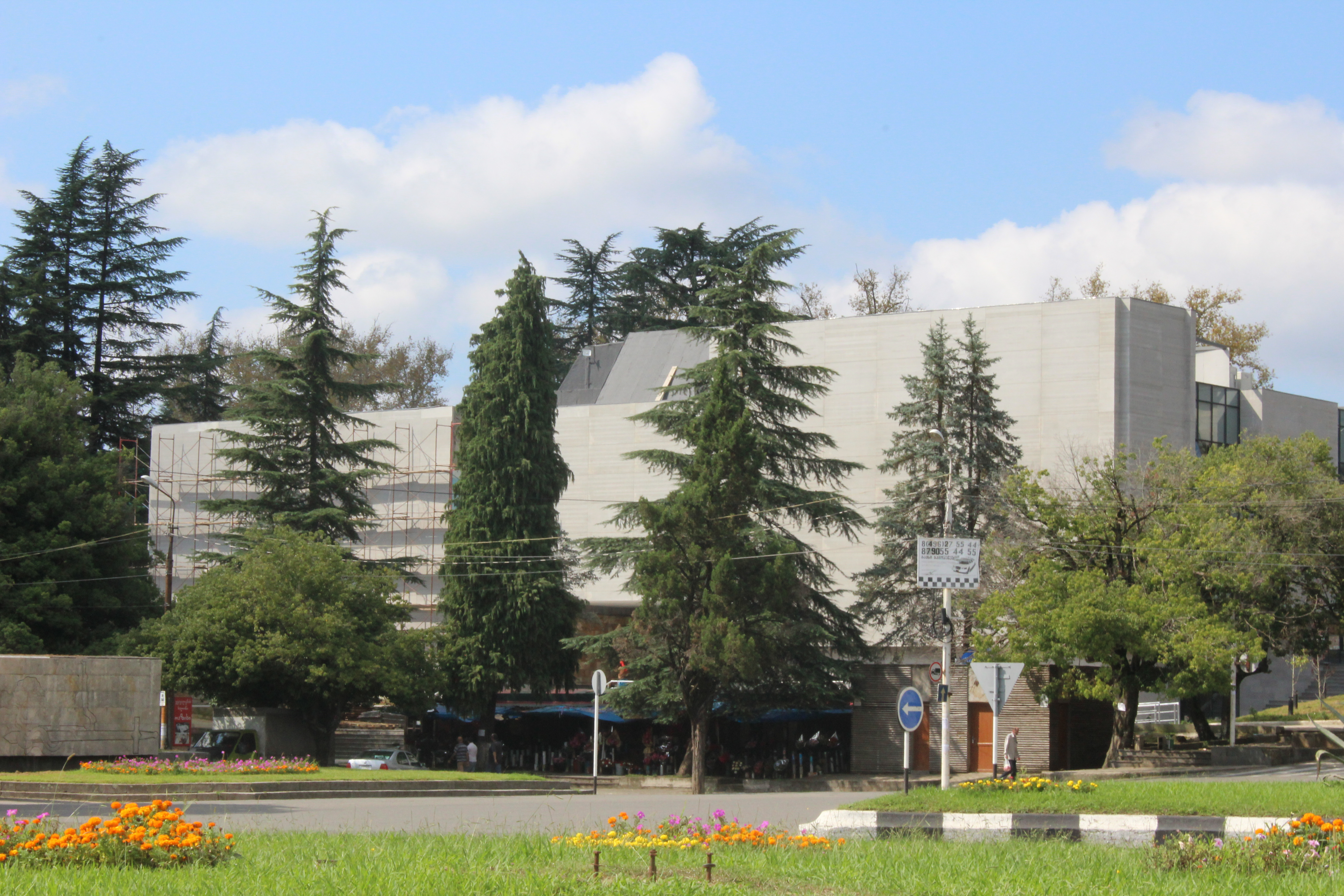
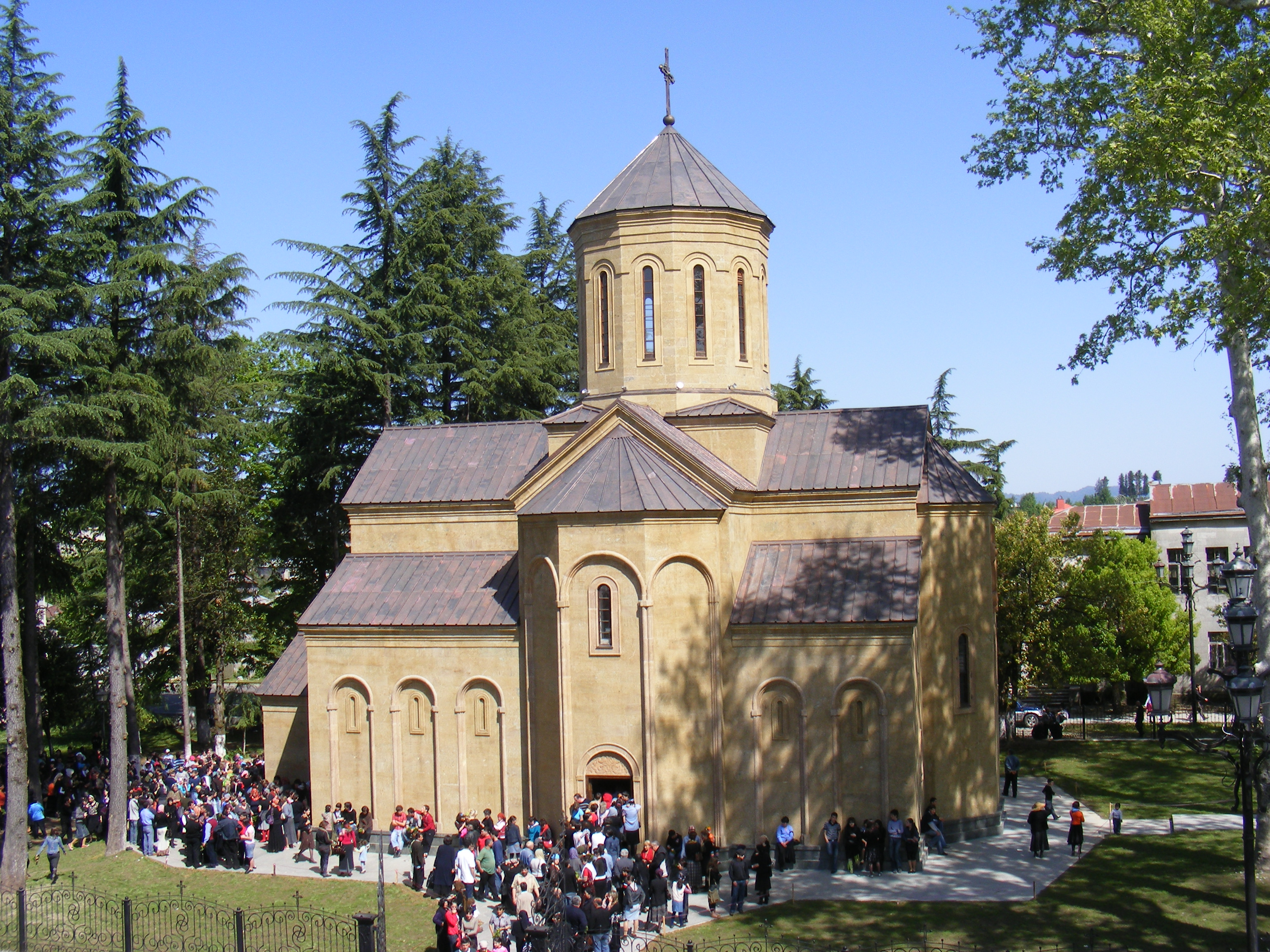
- Ozurgeti in winter History Museum Drama Theatre Church in Ozurgeti
- Interactive map of Ozurgeti
- Location within Georgia Location within Guria
- Coordinates: 41°55′37″N 42°00′02″E
- Country: Georgia
- Mkhare: Guria
- Municipality: Ozurgeti

Area
  - Total: 22.11 km^{2} (8.54 sq mi)
- Elevation: 80 m (260 ft)

Population (2024)
  - Total: 13,973
  - Density: 632.0/km^{2} (1,637/sq mi)
- Time zone: UTC+4 (Georgian Time)
- Postal code: 3500

Ozurgeti (Georgian: ოზურგეთი [o̞z̪uɾɡet̪ʰi]) is the capital of the western Georgian province of Guria. It was formerly known as Macharadze or Makharadze (named in honor of Filipp Makharadze). It is a regional center of tea and hazelnut processing. Ozurgeti is also administrative center of Ozurgeti District.

== Geography ==
Ozurgeti is 200 metres (656 feet) above sea level. Most of the town is located between the Bzhuzhi and Natanebi rivers. The Natanebi is a subterranean river in Ozurgeti, with a good deal of the city built on top of it, while the Bzhuzhi flows above ground. The city is bounded by hills in the north and south.

Ozurgeti sits on a slope that was leveled into three broad terraces: The market district, containing bazaars and small shops, as well as a plaza overlooked by a statue of a mermaid, is on the lowermost level. Most of the city’s public buildings—including municipal buildings, the cinema, the theater, and museums—as well as parks, are on the middle terrace. The highest level contains mostly private housing.

== Climate ==
The city has a humid subtropical climate, and experiences significant rainfall throughout the year. January is the coldest month and August is the hottest. Snow is rare and occurs primarily in January, February, and early March.

== History ==
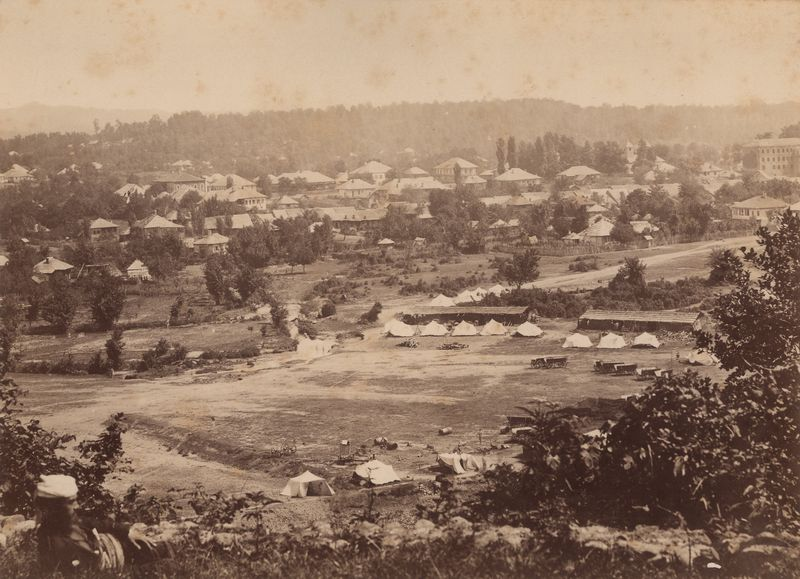
Ozurgeti in 1878.

Ozurgeti was founded in the late Middle Ages, and is first mentioned by name in 1578 in the New Georgian Chronicles (ახალი ქართლის ცხოვრობა, akhali qartlis tskhovroba). It became the centre of Guria soon after, serving as an important centre for trade and the home of the rulers of the Principality of Guria. The later discovery of a hoard of 270 silver coins under the city, the "Ozurgeti Treasure," is testament to this.

On December 14, 1846, Ozurgeti was designated as a city. At that time there were just over 300 residents, though the population grew as the city gained importance: by 1865 it had grown to over 700. It served as a strategic place for the course of the Russo-Turkish War (1877–78). It was the fourth city in Georgia to have a legal printing press, which began in 1891. During the Russian Empire, the city was the administrative center of the Ozurgeti Uyezd of the Kutaisi Governorate. On December 26, 1923, a rail line had been established, connecting Ozurgeti with the rest of the country. It was renamed "Makharadze" on July 9, 1934, in honour of the Georgian Bolshevik Filipp Makharadze. It would revert to its original name on May 15, 1989.

== Demographics ==
According to the 2014 Census, the city had a population of 14,785. In 2010, the population was estimated to be 20,636. The city is 94.5% ethnic Georgian, 3.8% Armenian, and 0.8% Russian. According to official statistics, 10% of the population lives below the poverty line and the unemployment rate is 15%. In 2020, the population was estimated to be 14,372.

== Culture ==
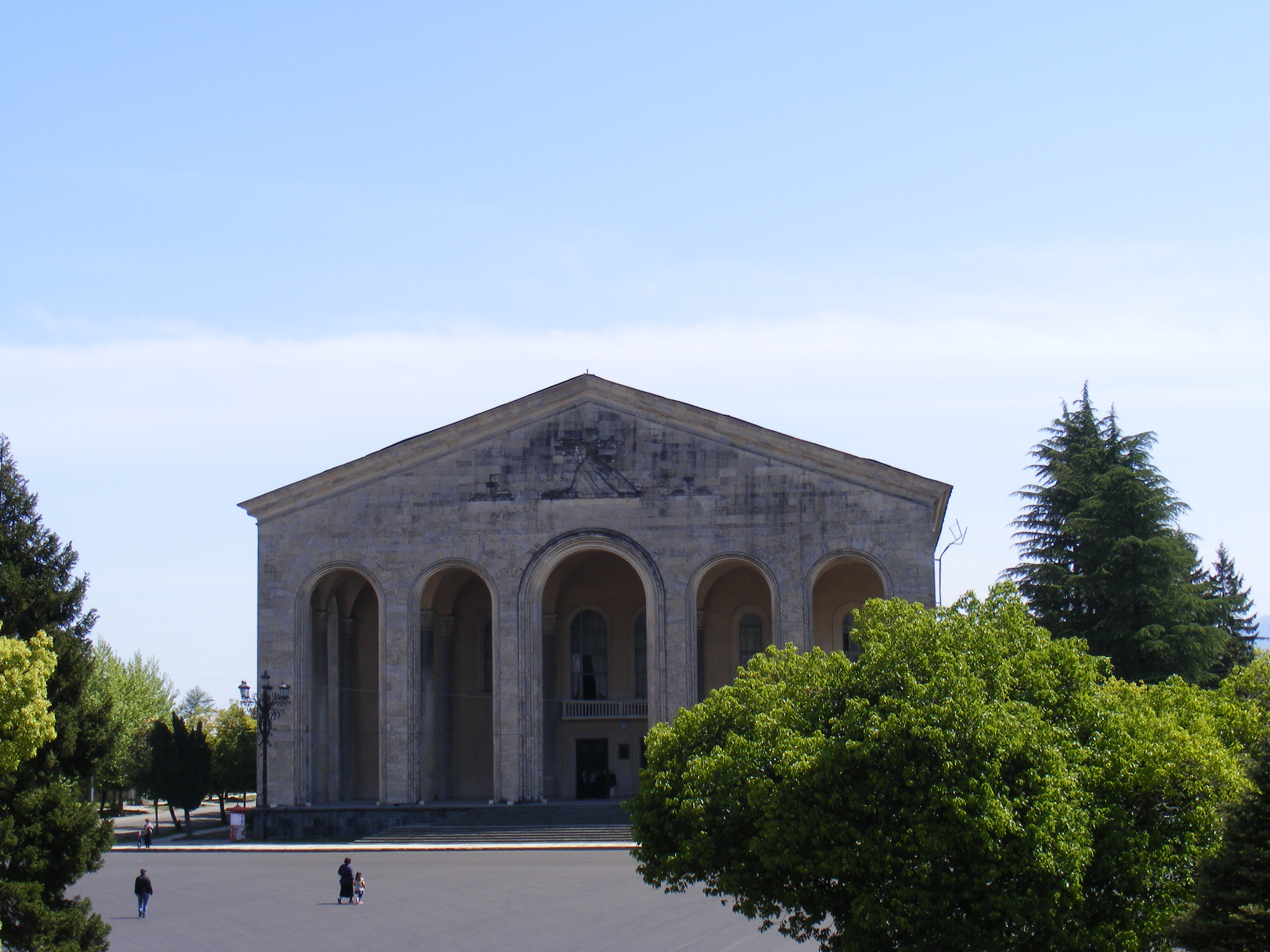
Ozurgeti Dramatic Theatre

=== Theater ===
The Ozurgeti Dramatic Theatre overlooks the city's central square. It is named in honor of Alexander Tsutsunava, whose statue stands in an adjoining park. It was founded in 1868, and the first production was a performance by local amateur actors. A new theater building was constructed in 1914. In 1933, another new building was constructed. In 1962, the theater was moved to yet another building, the five-storey Soviet Neoclassical-style structure in which it currently resides. It is one of the largest theaters in Georgia. In 1968, a large centennial celebration was held in the building and the theater was named after Tsutsunava. In 2005, the Ministry of Culture and the Theater Workers’ Union declared the Ozurgeti Dramatic Theater to be the best regional theater in Georgia.

=== History Museum ===
The Ozurgeti History Museum was founded in 1936, moved to Gurieli Palace in 1974, and relocated to its current site in 1991. The museum contains over 6,000 artifacts, and it currently includes archaeological, numismatic, ethnographic, heraldic, sphragistic, and historical exhibits, and perhaps most prominently displayed among them is a sword that allegedly belonged to Napoleon Bonaparte. It also houses a collection of old printed books.

=== Public life ===
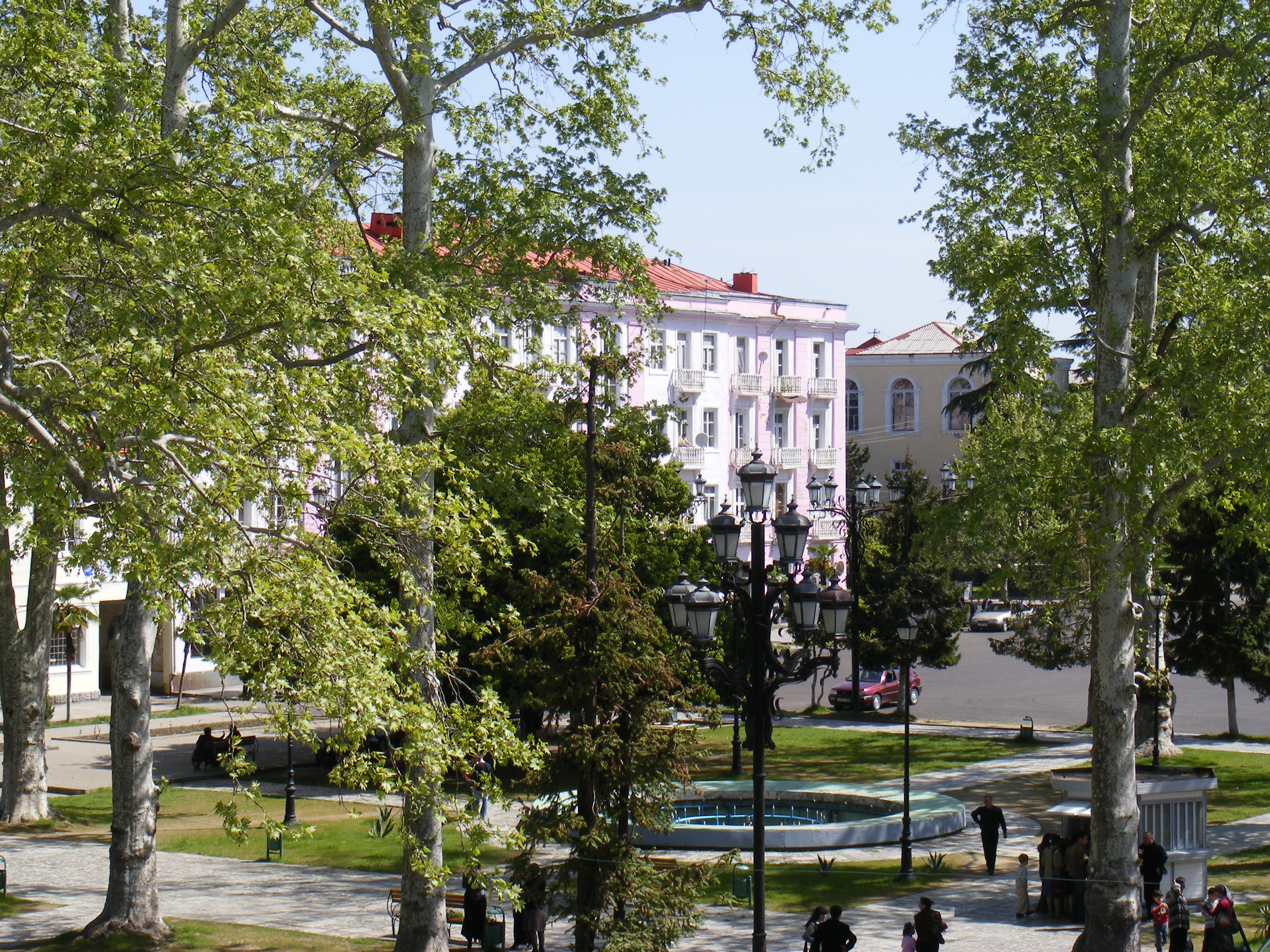
Ozurgeti city center

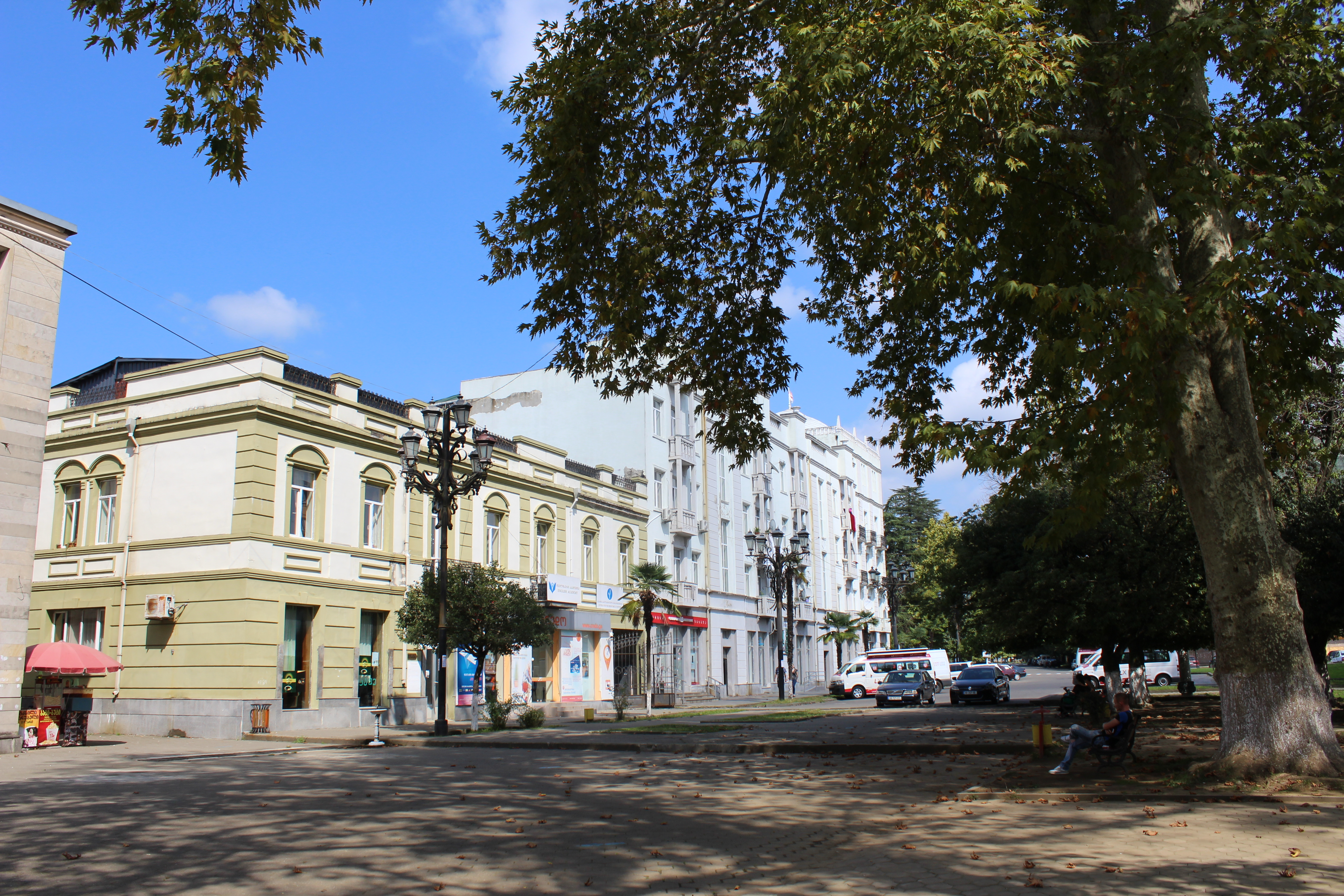
Ozurgeti central garden

There are 15 NGOs in Ozurgeti, most of which focus on the city’s youth, civil society, democracy, women’s rights, and agronomy. There is a branch of the Georgian Young Lawyers’ Association in the city. The television station Guria TV, which broadcasts to the entire region, is also based in the city.

The city has three newspapers, some of which serve the entire region. Several other cultural organizations exist in the city: A city library, a children’s theater, and a modern art gallery.

== Notable structures ==
An ancient Byzantine-era bathhouse was recently discovered in central Ozurgeti and the ruins are under excavation. It is a two storey-structure. The lower, subterranean floor was the fire chamber which heated an upper floor that contained public baths.

Gurieli Palace, constructed in 1873, is also near the city center. It currently serves as the seat of the Shemokmedi Orthodox Bishopric.

== Education ==
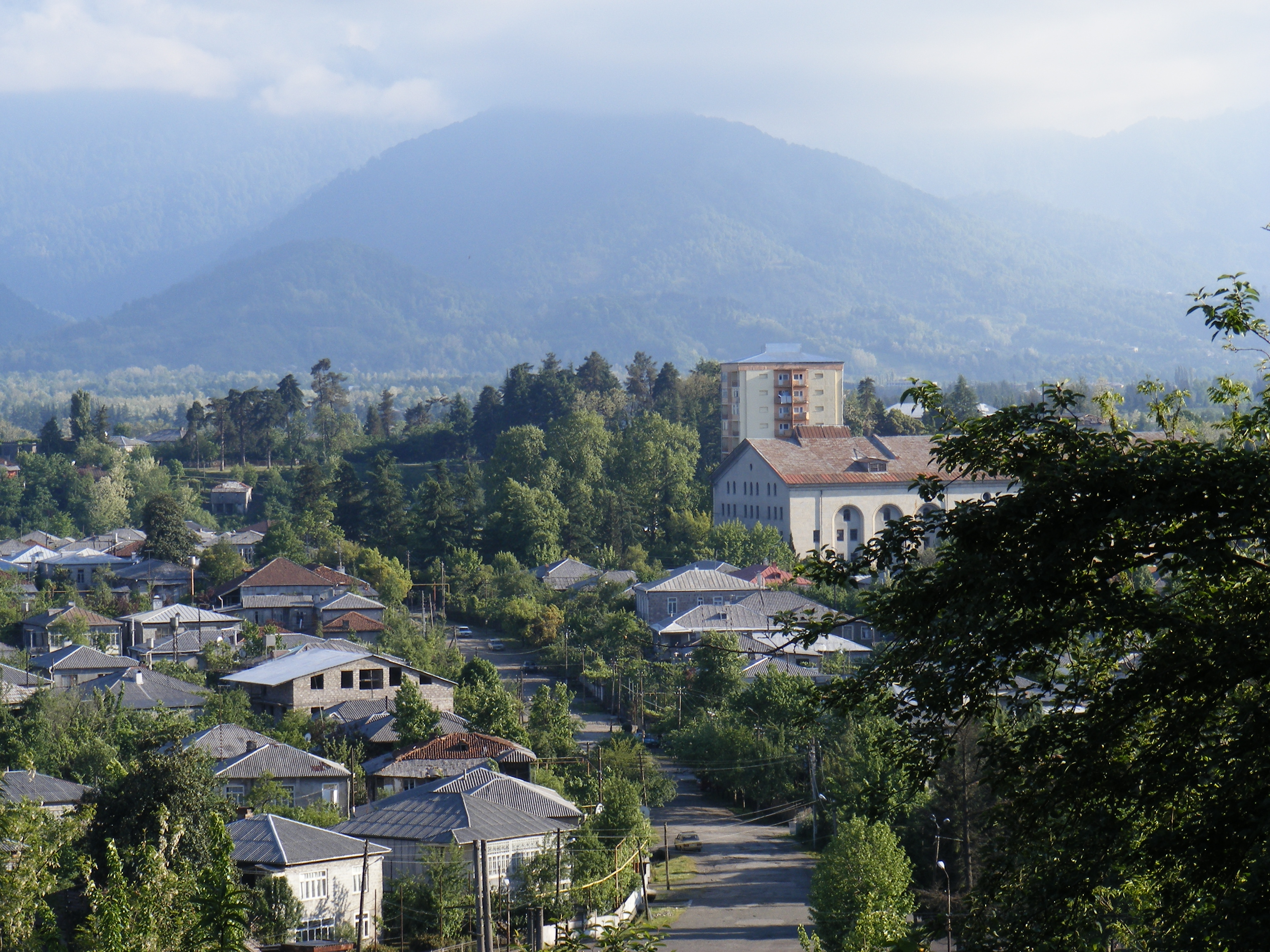
View of Ozurgeti

The first school in the city was established on February 21, 1850. At various times, Simon Gugunava, Niko Mari, and Ekvtime Takaishvili attended the school. On July 1, 1874, the school came under municipal administration. Interest in education and literacy was increasing at this time. Due to widespread political activism among the student population, the school was briefly closed on the order of the Transcaucasia Governorate near the end of the 19th century.

In the beginning of the 20th century, Constantine Leselidze and Porfiry Chanchibadze also attended the school. In 1918, the city school introduced elementary-level education. In 1922, due to increasing attendance, a new school, thereafter called School #2, was opened. Both schools offered education to the 7th grade.

There are now five public schools, two parochial schools, nine kindergartens, and one art school in Ozurgeti. As of 2010, the total number of students enrolled in primary and secondary schools was roughly 2,850, and there were 236 teachers. There is also a vocational college with some 500 students and 30 instructors.

== Sports ==
Ozurgeti has rugby and football clubs. There are two stadia in the city: Friendship Stadium belongs to the municipality and is used by the football club; Zvani Stadium is used by the rugby club. In 2007, a “sport palace,” containing a space that can be converted into a miniature football stadium, a volleyball court, a basketball court, and a wrestling ring, was built. The city operates a municipal sports school including a tae kwon do club, a basketball club, a tennis club, a boxing club, a track club, a judo club, a weightlifting club, a freestyle wrestling club, and a hockey club.

== Notable residents ==
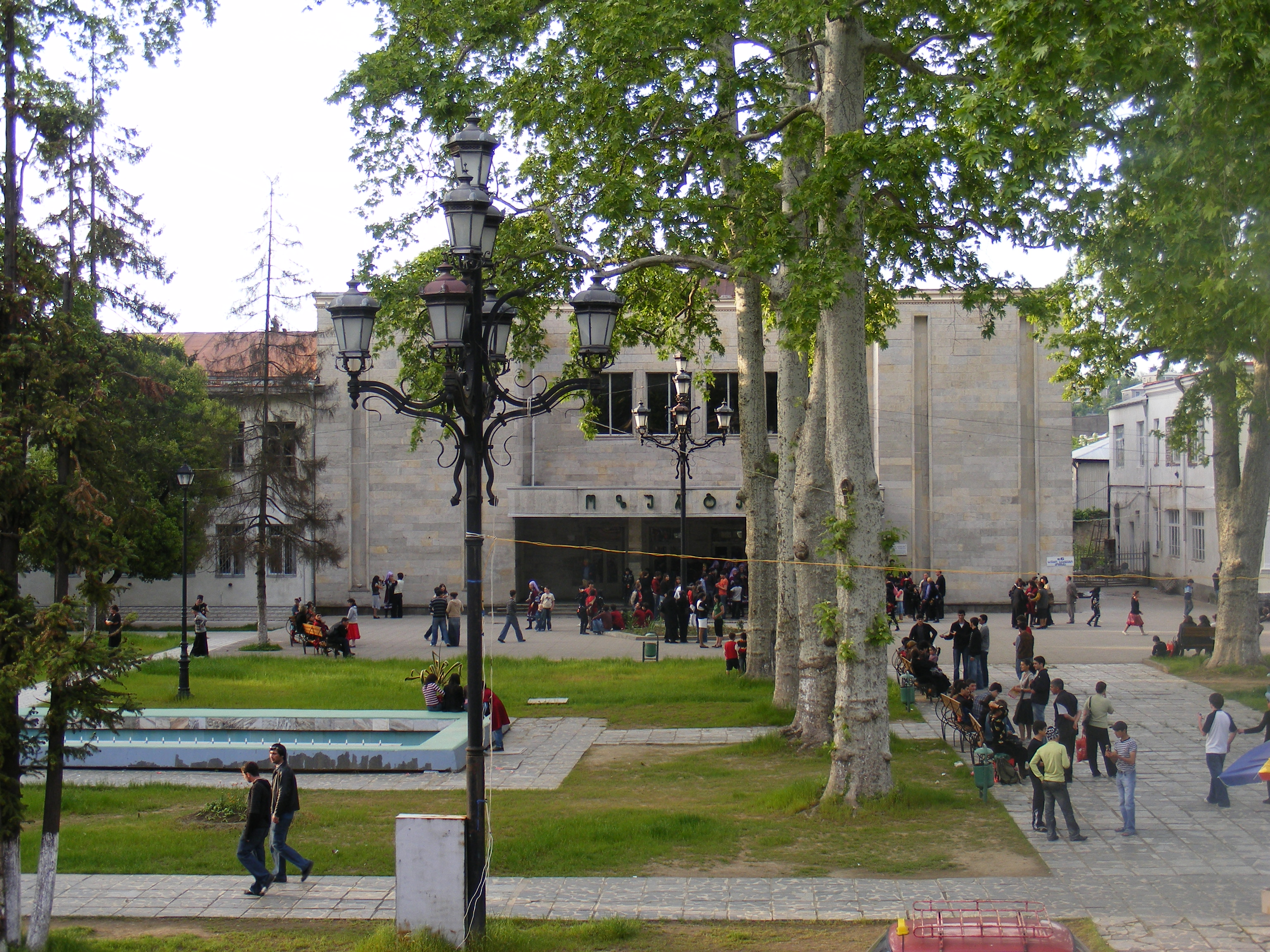
Ozurgeti Cinema

- Siko Dolidze – Film director and screenwriter
- Viktor Dolidze – Georgian composer
- Grigol Tkabladze – Actor
- Giorgi Kekelidze – Poet
- Simon Gugunava – Poet
- Niko Marr – Historian and ethnographer
- Ekvtime Takaishvili – Historian and ethnographer
- Konstantin Leselidze – Red Army Commander during The Second World War
- Porfile Chanchibadze – Red Army General
- Zviad Kvachantiradze – Ambassador. Politician and Diplomat
- Manuchar Kvirkvelia – Winner of the Olympic gold medal in Greco-Roman wrestling
- Vakhtang Blagidze – Winner of the Olympic gold medal in Greco-Roman wrestling

== Honors ==
A minor planet, 2139 Makharadze, discovered in 1970 by Soviet astronomer Tamara Mikhailovna Smirnova was named after the city (sister city of Henichesk) in honor of the friendship between the Georgian and Ukrainian peoples.

== See also ==
- Guria

== Bibliography ==
- Georgian Soviet Encyclopedia, Vol. 6, p. 517 (1983)
