= Roman Krutsyk =

Ukrainian politician (1945–2023)

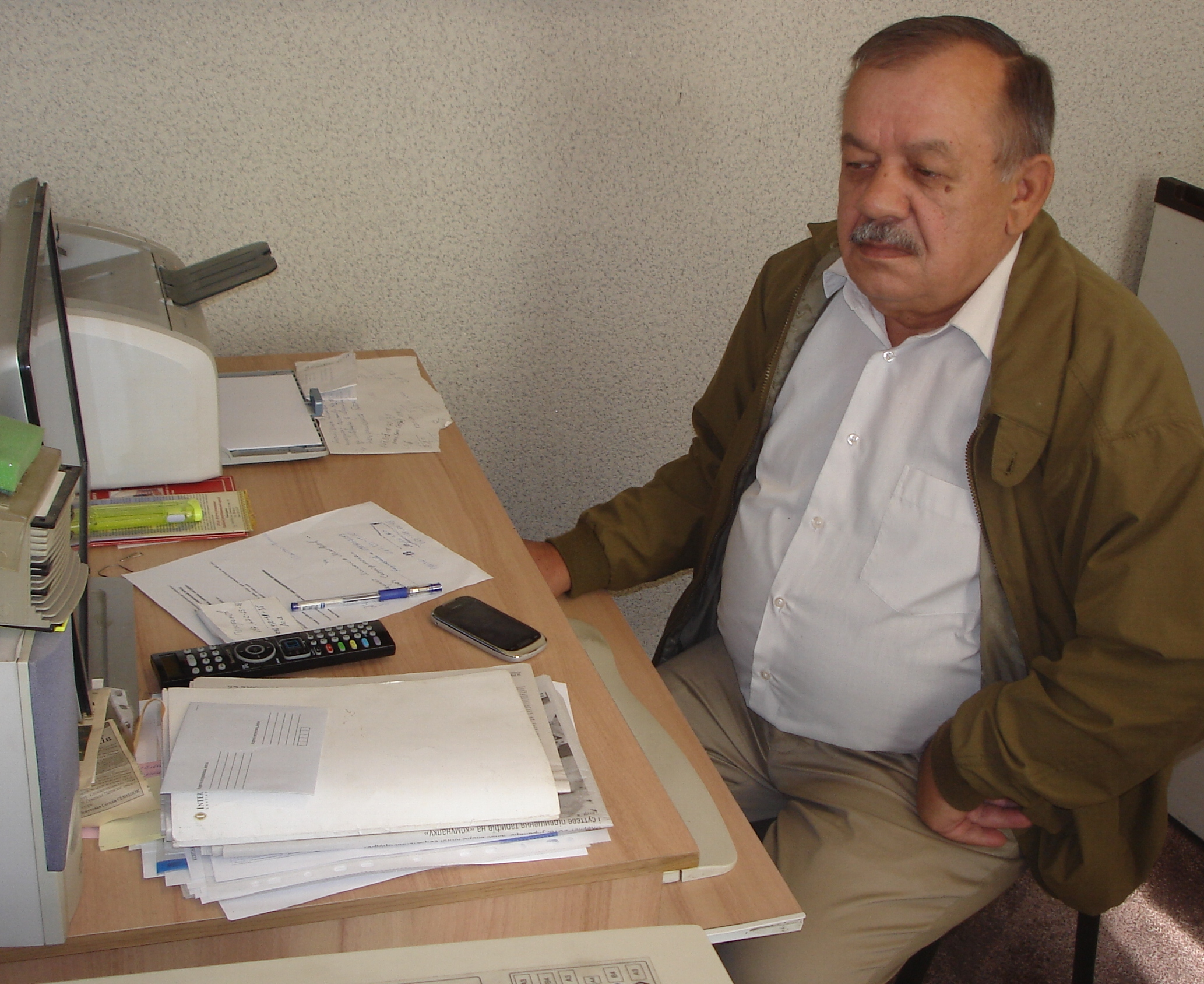
Image of Roman Krutsyk

Roman Mykolayovych Krutsyk (Ukrainian: Роман Миколайович Круцик; 6 July 1945 – 23 December 2023) was a Ukrainian politician. He was an MP in 1994–1998 from the Congress of Ukrainian Nationalists. Krutsyk was the director of Museum of Soviet Occupation from 2007 until his death on 23 December 2023, at the age of 78.
