= Ozurgeti Drama Theatre =

Theater in Ozurgeti, Georgia

- ოზურგეთის დრამატული თეატრი
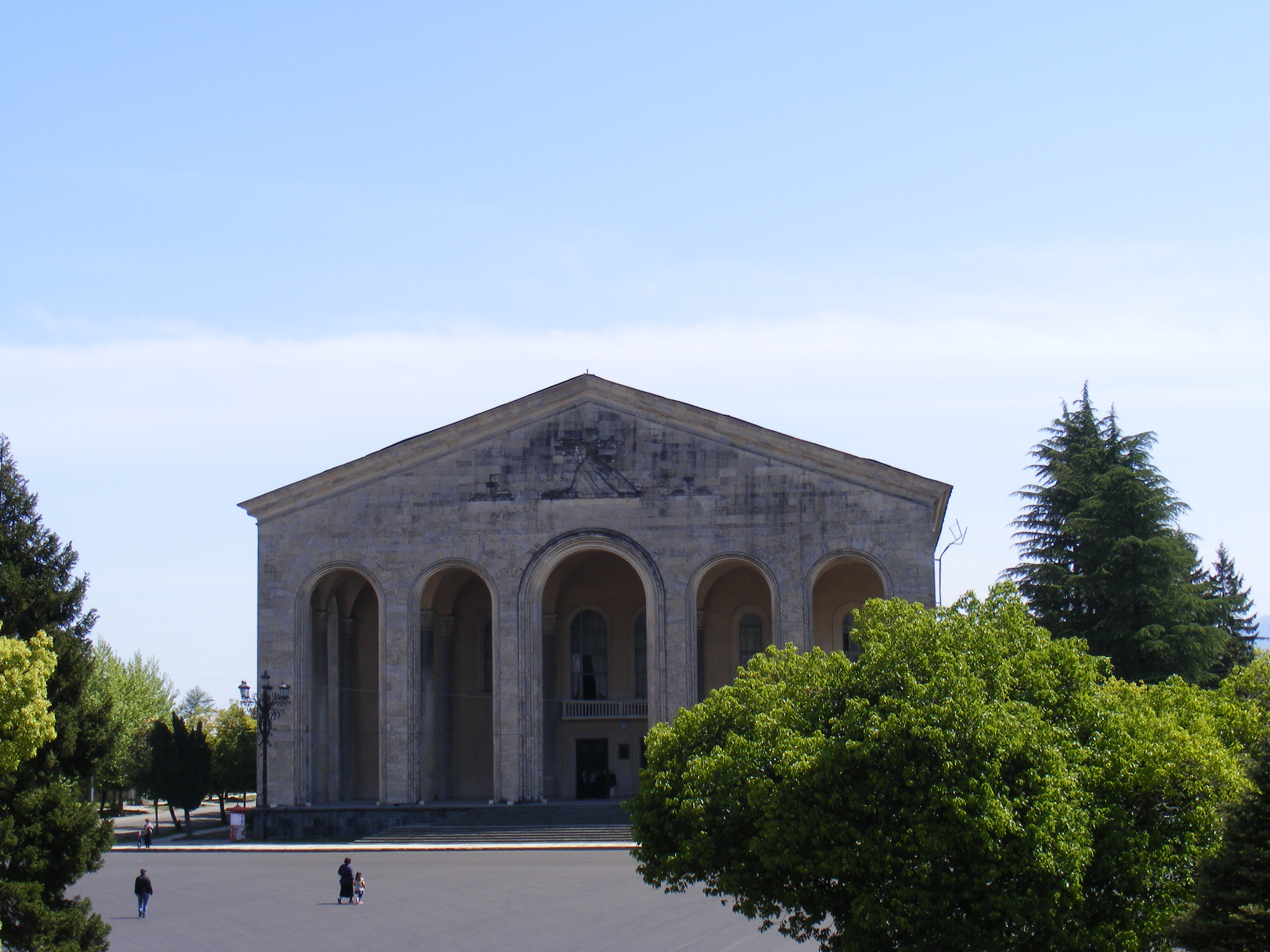
- Interactive map of the Ozurgeti Drama Theatre area

General information
- Type: Performance venue
- Architectural style: Neoclassical
- Location: Ozurgeti, Georgia
- Coordinates: 41°55′24″N 42°0′22″E
- Named for: Alexandre Tsutsunava
- Construction started: 1934
- Inaugurated: 1962
- Renovated: 2020
- Owner: Municipality of Ozurgeti

Technical details
- Floor count: 5

Design and construction
- Architects: Vano Kadieshvili, Kote Chkheidze

Ozurgeti Drama Theatre (Georgian: ოზურგეთის დრამატული თეატრი) is a theater in Ozurgeti, Georgia.
