= Gudani =

- Village
- Location in Punjab, India Gudani (India)
- Coordinates: 31.230852°N 75.994216°E
- Country: India
- State: Punjab
- District: Kapurthala

Government
  - Type: Panchayati raj (India)
  - Body: Gram panchayat

Population (2011)
  - Total: 593
- Sex ratio 308/285♂/♀

Languages
  - Official: Punjabi
  - Other spoken: Hindi
- Time zone: UTC+5:30 (IST)
- PIN: 144601
- Telephone code: 01822
- ISO 3166 code: IN-PB
- Vehicle registration: PB-09
- Website: kapurthala.gov.in

Gudani is a village in Kapurthala district of Punjab State, India. It is located 9 kilometres (5.6 mi) from Kapurthala, which is both district and sub-district headquarters of Gudani. The village is administrated by a Sarpanch who is an elected representative of village as per the constitution of India and Panchayati raj (India).

== Demography ==
According to the report published by Census India in 2011, Gudani has total number of 109 houses and population of 593 of which include 308 males and 285 females. Literacy rate of Gudani is 74.23%, lower than state average of 75.84%. The population of children under the age of 6 years is 73 which is 12.31% of total population of Gudani, and child sex ratio is approximately 738, higher than state average of 846.

== Population data ==
Particulars	Total	Male	Female
Total No. of Houses	109	-	-
Population	593	308	285
Child (0-6)	73	42	31
Schedule Caste	400	209	191
Schedule Tribe	0	0	0
Literacy	74.23 %	80.83 % 67.32%	
Total Workers	199	163	36
Main Worker	183	0	0
Marginal Worker	16	6	10

== Air travel connectivity ==
The closest airport to the village is Sri Guru Ram Dass Jee International Airport.
