= Samtskhe–Javakheti History Museum =

Museum in Georgia

Akhaltsikhe Museum
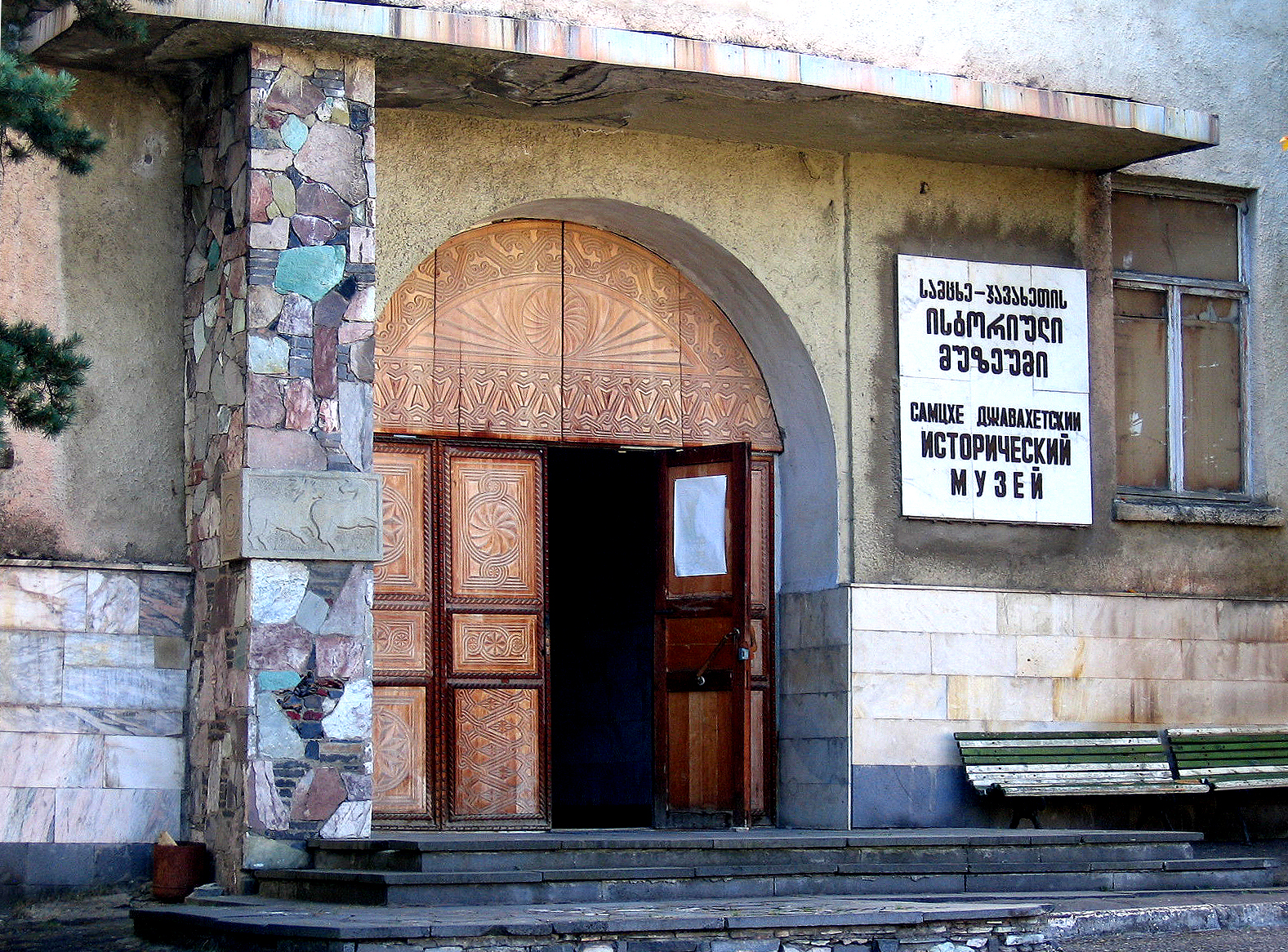
- Location: Georgia
- Coordinates: 41°38′33″N 42°58′35″E
- Location of Samtskhe–Javakheti History Museum

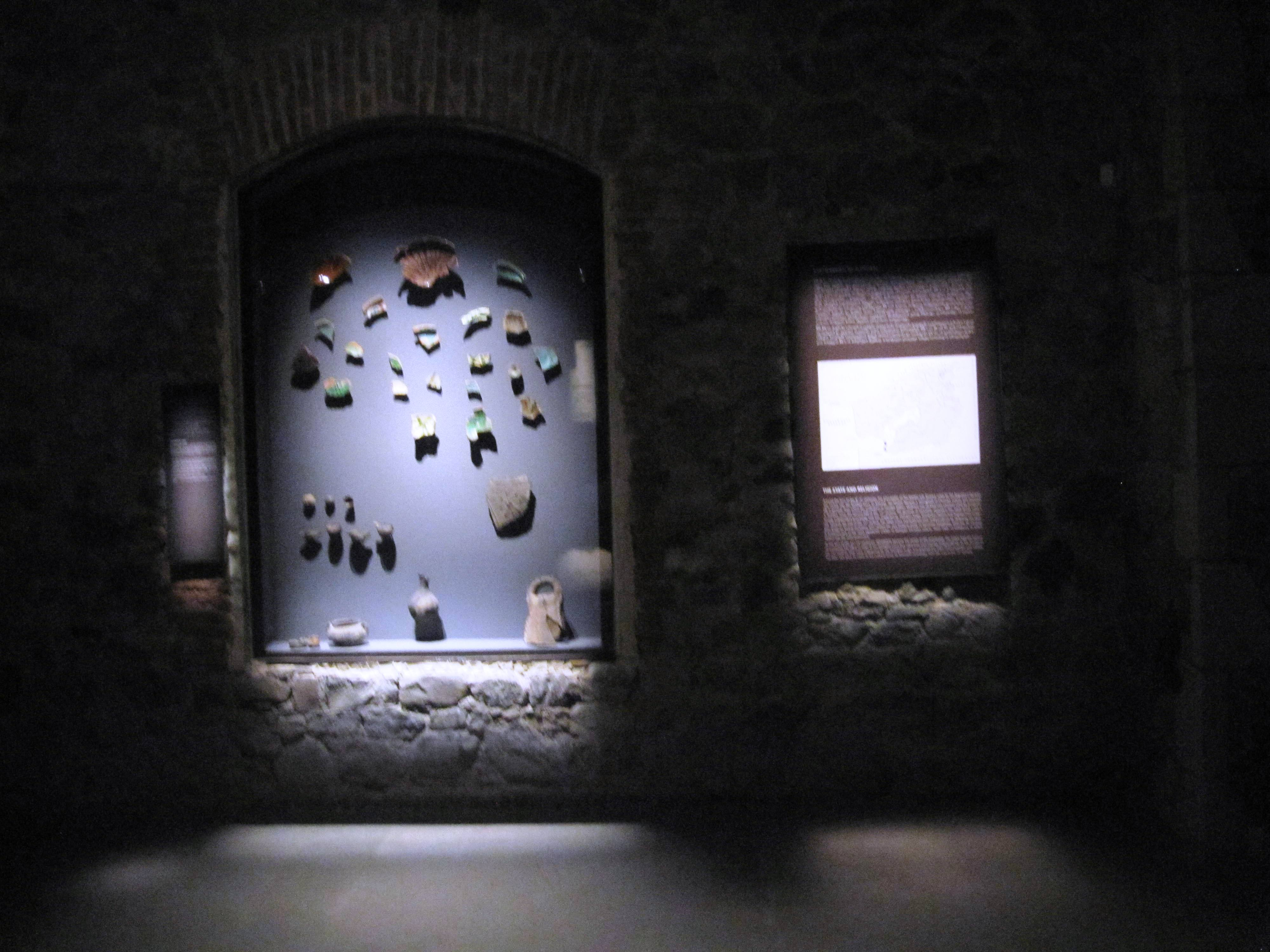
A medieval exhibition hall at the Samtskhe-Javakheti History Museum.

The Samtskhe–Javakheti History Museum (Georgian: სამცხე-ჯავახეთის ისტორიული მუზეუმი) is a museum in Akhaltsikhe, Samtskhe–Javakheti, Georgia, founded in 1923. In its current renovated form, the museum was opened in 2012 as part of the Georgian National Museum network. It is located on the territory of the reconstructed fortress of Akhaltsikhe, known as "Rabati".
