= Dvabzu =

Dvabzu დვაბზუ
- Village
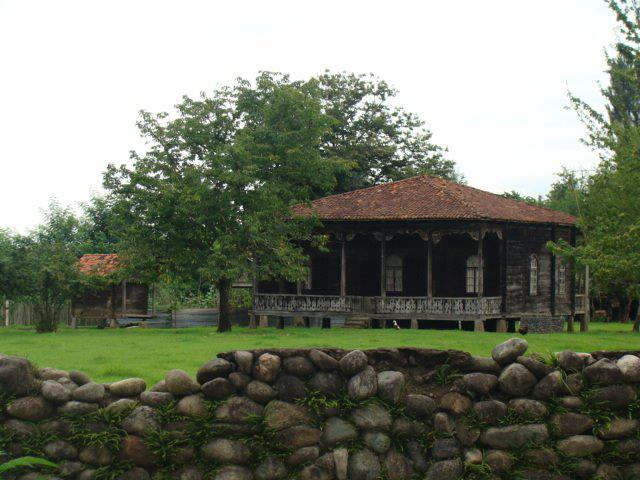

- Location within Georgia Location within Guria
- Coordinates: 41°56′11″N 42°03′27″E
- Country: Georgia
- Mkhare: Guria
- Municipality: Ozurgeti
- Elevation: 130 m (430 ft)

Population (2014)
  - Total: 1,171
- Time zone: UTC+4 (Georgian Time)

Dvabzu (Georgian: დვაბზუ) is a village in the Ozurgeti Municipality of Guria in western Georgia.
