= Arbo, Georgia =

Arbo არბო
- Location in Georgia
- Coordinates: 42°13′32″N 44°03′40″E
- Country: Georgia
- Region: Shida Kartli
- Municipality: Gori
- Elevation: 920 m (3,020 ft)

Population (2014)
  - Total: 293
- Time zone: UTC+4 (Georgian Time)

Arbo (Georgian: არბო) is a village in the Gori Municipality, Shida Kartli, Georgia. It lies on the right bank of the river Little Liakhvi, some 29 km north of the city of Gori. As of the 2014 census, the village had a population of 293, with the ethnic Georgian majority (99,7%).

== Culture ==
Arbo houses a memorial museum of the 19th-century Georgian writer Niko Lomouri, a native of the village, and two churches of Saint George, one, a single nave basilica, built in the 10th century, and the other, a crossed domed design, built in the 19th century.

== History ==
The foundation of Arbo is attributed by popular memory to Queen Tamar around 1184. It is closely linked with the late 10th-century church of St. George, which is associated with the surviving tradition of an August feast of that saint, known as arbooba. The village is mentioned in the 18th-century geography by Prince Vakhushti of Kartli, several documents from that century, and a travelogue of Johann Anton Güldenstädt (1787–1791).

The village lies immediately adjacent to the conflict zone of South Ossetia. During the August 2008 Russo-Georgian War, the village was briefly occupied by the Russian and South Ossetian forces, resulting in the temporary displacement of 60-65% of Arbo's population. According to the Georgian Ombudsman's Office, Arbo saw an "incursion of armed bands, robbery,... as well as violence towards peaceful population." In the post-war years, Arbo was one of those villages that, Georgia said, was the scene of the "border demarcation works" conducted by the Russian military in South Ossetia in 2010 and reconnaissance flights of Russian helicopters and drones over the ceasefire line in 2014.

== See also ==
- Shida Kartli
