= Niko Lomouri =

Georgian writer and educator (1852-1912)

- ნიკო ლომოური
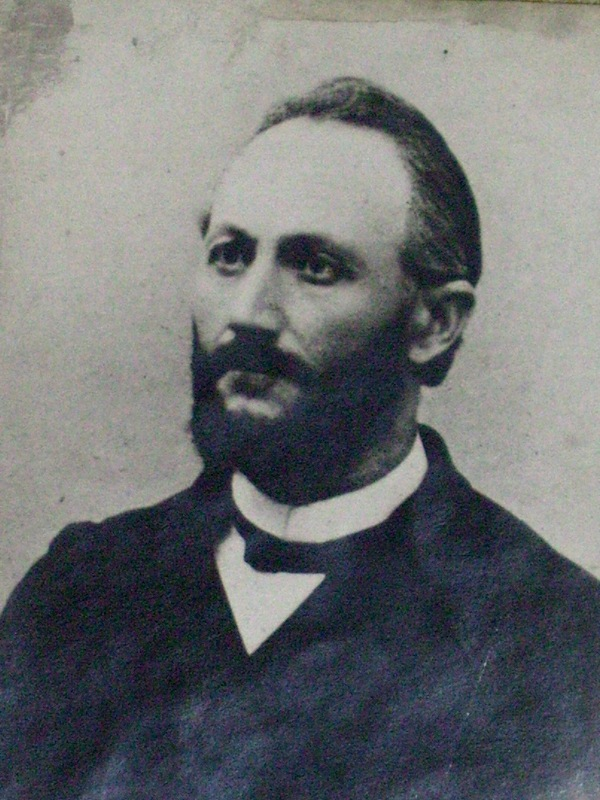
- Born: February 7, 1852; Arbo, Tiflis Governorate, Russian Empire
- Died: April 17, 1915 (aged 63); Gori, Tiflis Governorate, Russian Empire
- Occupations: Writer; educator
- Notable work: Flame; Qajana

Niko Lomouri (Georgian: ნიკო ლომოური; 7 February 1852 – 17 April 1915) was a Georgian writer and educator.

== Early life ==
Born into an Orthodox priest's family in the village of Arbo near Gori in then-Russian-held Georgia, Lomouri attended theological colleges in Gori, Tbilisi. In Kiev, he came under the influence of Russian radical populist movement (narodniks) from 1875 to 1879. In his turn, induced other Georgian students in Kiev, such as Davit Kldiashvili, to begin writing. Back to Georgia, Lomouri had to make a living as a schoolteacher in Tbilisi, Gori, and, eventually, in his own village.

== Works ==
Lomouri's poems were first published in the magazine Mnatobi in 1871, but his most resonant work, the story Flame (ალი, ali) appeared in the magazine Iveria in 1879. The plot dealt with the intimidation and expulsion by the rich of a peasant widow and her son. This was followed by a series of children-oriented stories of peasant life, preaching the need for education. One of these, Qajana, was filmed in Soviet Georgia in 1941. Lomouri also translated some pieces of Lord Byron into Georgian. He died in Gori in 1915.
