= Museum of Soviet Occupation, Kyiv =

Museum in Kyiv, Ukraine

Coordinates: 50°23′37.85″N 30°30′17.78″E

Museum of Soviet Occupation
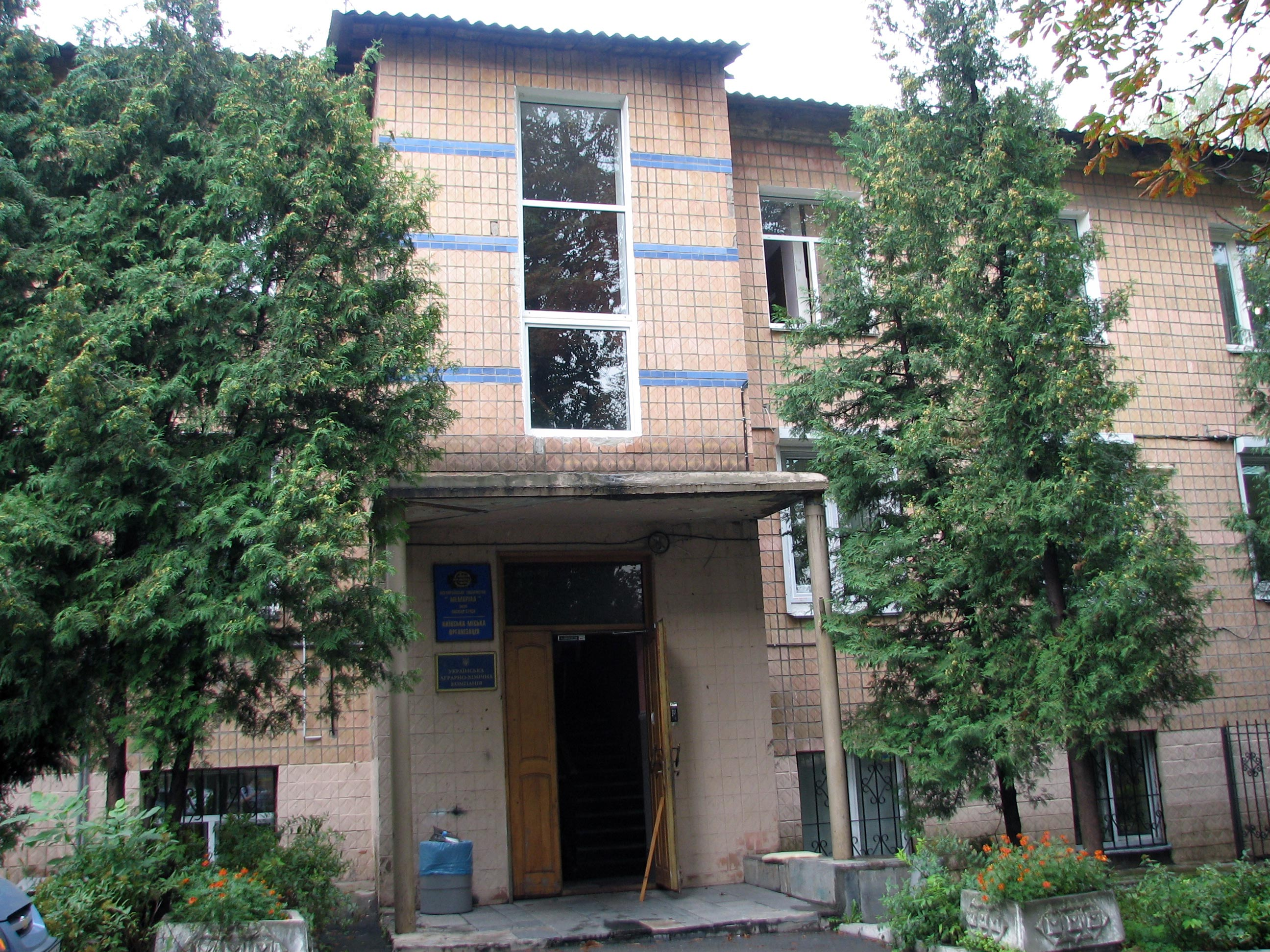
- The entrance to the Museum of Soviet occupation in 2007.
- Established: November 2001
- Location: Kyiv, Ukraine
- Website: http://memorial.kiev.ua/expo/eng/second.html

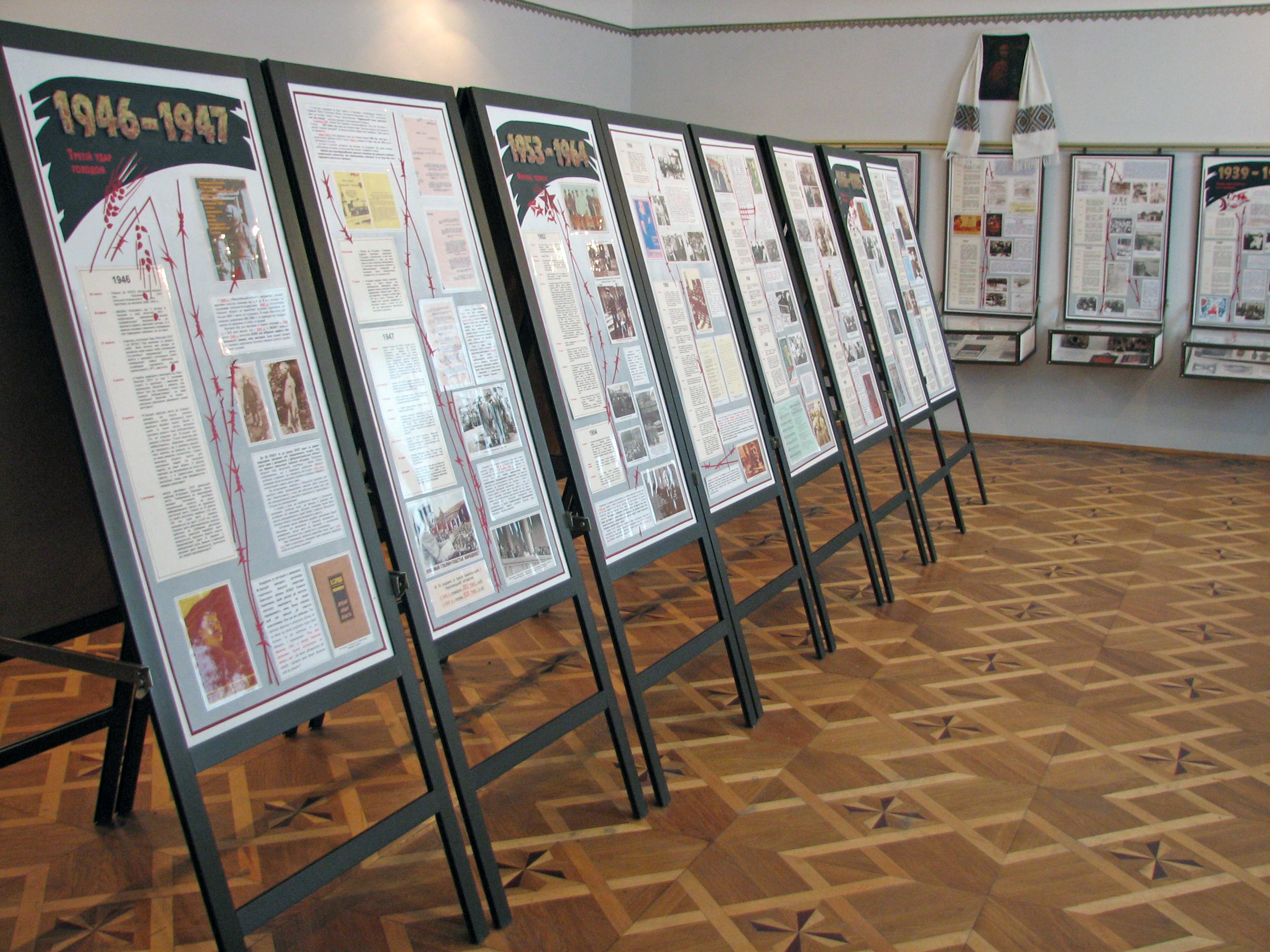
Part of the exhibitions at the Museum of Soviet occupation in 2007.

The Museum of Soviet occupation (Ukrainian: Музей радянської окупації, Muzei radianskoi okupatsii) in Kyiv, Ukraine, is devoted to portraying the crimes of the Soviet regime in Ukraine from 1917 to 1991. It was established in November 2001 by the Vasyl Stus branch of Memorial Society as an exhibition "Not to be forgotten: The Chronicle of Communist inquisition." Between 2001 and 2007, the exposition grew into a full-fledged museum. On May 30, 2007, it received its current name.

== History ==
In November 2001, the Vasyl Stus branch of Memorial Society established on its premises an exhibition titled "Not to be forgotten: The Chronicle of Communist inquisition." Documents, photographs and posters made up the initial items of the exposition. These were gathered by the Memorial branch in Ukraine and by sister-organizations in Russia. Among the most interesting exposee items is a large map of Soviet concentration camps in Ukraine created during the time of Beria. The exhibition contained such sections as "Kyiv Martyrology", "Ukrainian Solovky", an exhibition on repression of the Ukrainian language, a special library. It has numerous archives of documents, books, videotapes etc.

In May 2007 the exhibition was named a Museum of Soviet occupation. The Museum was visited by Honorary President of the Paneuropean Union and a direct descendant of the Habsburg family Otto von Habsburg.

The very fact of the opening of such an institution initially raised disputes in the Ukrainian society. Olha Ginsburg, the head of the State Archive Committee of Ukraine at the time and a member of the Communist Party of Ukraine, refused to share archive materials with the new Museum. Such refusal was described by the Director of Vasyl Stus Memorial Society Roman Krutsyk as "an ordinary communist practice to conceal their crimes".

Eponymous museums are active in Georgia (Museum of Soviet Occupation (Tbilisi)), Latvia and Estonia.

== See also ==
- Virtual Museum of Soviet Repression in Belarus
