= Museum of Soviet Occupation (Tbilisi) =

Museum in Tbilisi, Georgia

Coordinates: 41.6958°N 44.8004°E

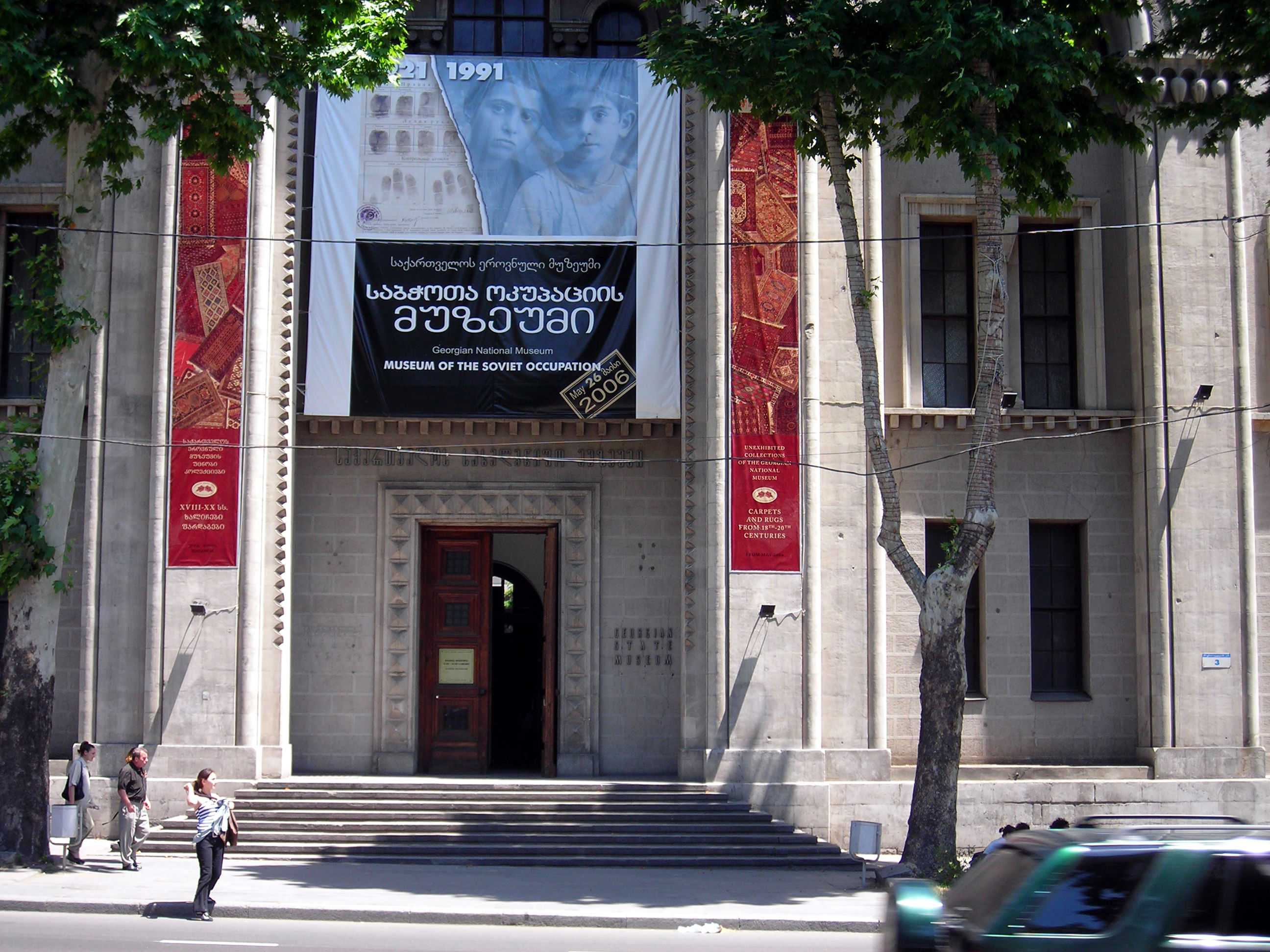
Museum of Soviet Occupation in Rustaveli Avenue, Tbilisi

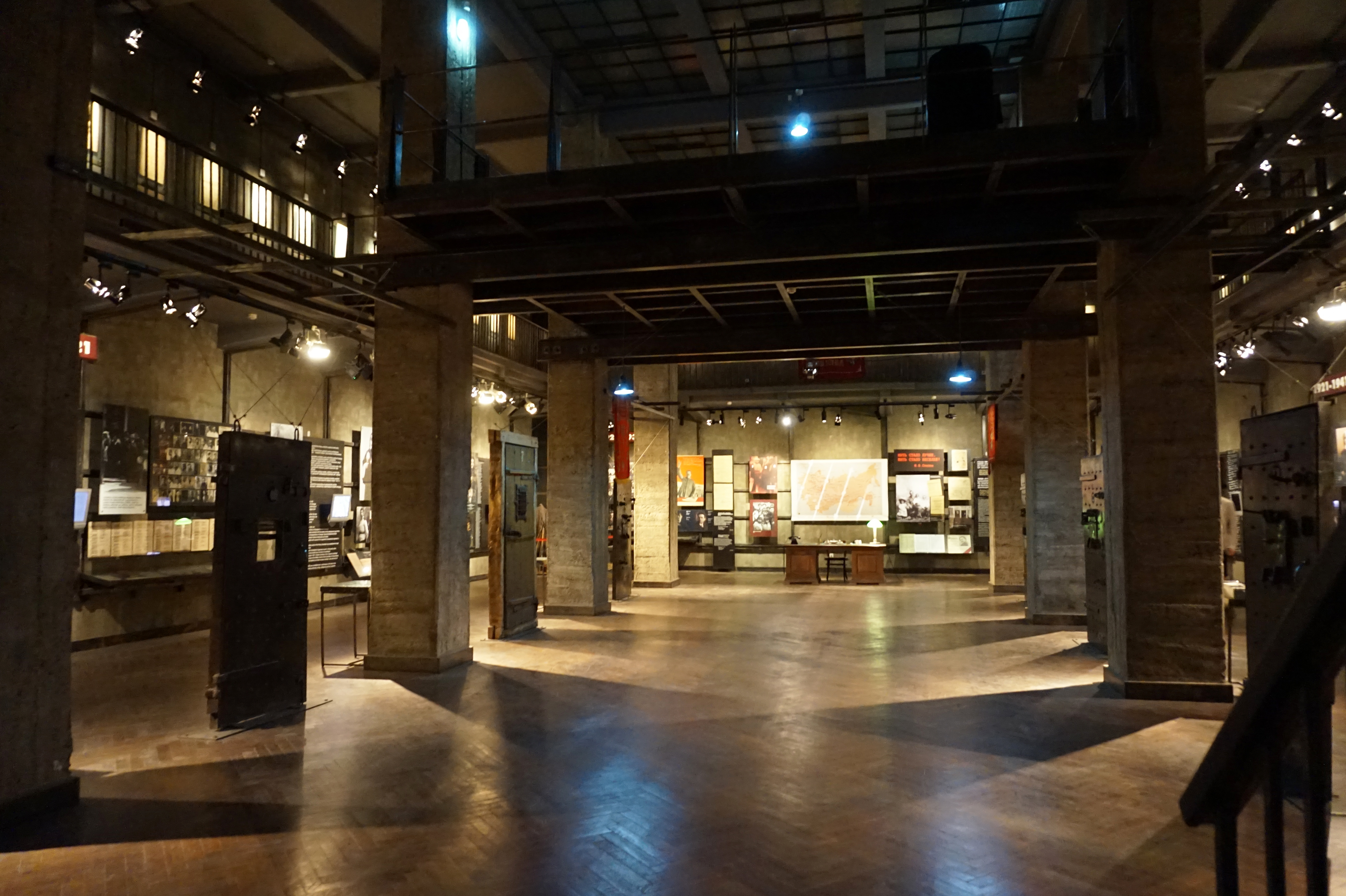
One of the exhibit halls inside the Museum of Soviet Occupation

The Museum of the Soviet Occupation (Georgian: საბჭოთა ოკუპაციის მუზეუმი, sabch’ot’a okupats’iis muzeumi) is a history museum in Tbilisi, Georgia, documenting the seven decades of the Soviet rule in Georgia (1921–1991) and dedicated to the history of the anti-occupational, national-liberation movement of Georgia, to the victims of the Soviet political repressions throughout this period. It was established on May 26, 2006. The museum is a part of the Georgian National Museum (GNM).

== Exhibition ==
The museum is located on Rustaveli Avenue, Tbilisi's main thoroughfare, and is administered as a part of the Georgian National Museum. Being the third such museum in the post-Soviet states, it was inspired, at least partially, by the examples of similar exhibitions in Tallinn (Estonia) and Riga (Latvia). It was inaugurated in the framework of Georgia's Independence Day celebration on May 26, 2006. The necessary financing was primarily provided by the Presidential Fund, an extra-budgetary source of revenue controlled by the administration of the president of Georgia. The number of exhibited items is around 3,000.

The Museum of the Soviet Occupation is a permanent exhibition displaying archive documents, photo and video materials following the timeline of Georgia’s history from the short-lived independence between 1918 and 1921 to the Soviet army crackdown on the pro-independence rally in 1989 and the declaration of Georgia’s independence in 1991. Other exhibits include protocols of dissidents' examinations, orders to shoot or exile, personal files of the repressed people, artifacts from Soviet-era prison cells. In addition to the Soviet security (KGB) and Communist Party archival reserves, which have survived to be evacuated from Georgia following the dissolution of the Soviet Union, many documents and visual material have been provided by several public organizations and the dissidents' families. The museum publishes thematic collections and regularly invites historians to deliver public lectures on Georgia’s 20th-century history. From 2006 to 2008, the director of the museum was David Tskhadadze; since December 2008, the museum is managed by Dr. Levan Urushadze.

== Reactions ==
The symbolism and timing of the museum’s opening irked several politicians in Russia, who denounced the museum as a "purely nationalist propaganda." The President of Russia Vladimir Putin complained to his Georgian counterpart, Mikheil Saakashvili, at their meeting in St. Petersburg in June 2006, pointing out that many of the leading Soviet leaders such as Joseph Stalin and Lavrentiy Beria came from Georgia. According to a source in the Georgian government Saakashvili’s response was to suggest offering funds for Russia to open a Museum of the Georgian Occupation in Moscow. Later, Saakashvili asserted that the museum was not directed against anyone: "this is a museum of the Soviet occupation, not of a Russian occupation of Georgia... If someone, somewhere, at some level, takes this personally, that is their problem and not ours."

In March 2007, the museum was visited by the president of Ukraine, Victor Yuschenko, who suggested opening a similar museum in Ukraine.

== See also ==
- Soviet Occupation Day, Georgia
