= Gurianta =

Gurianta გურიანთა
- Village
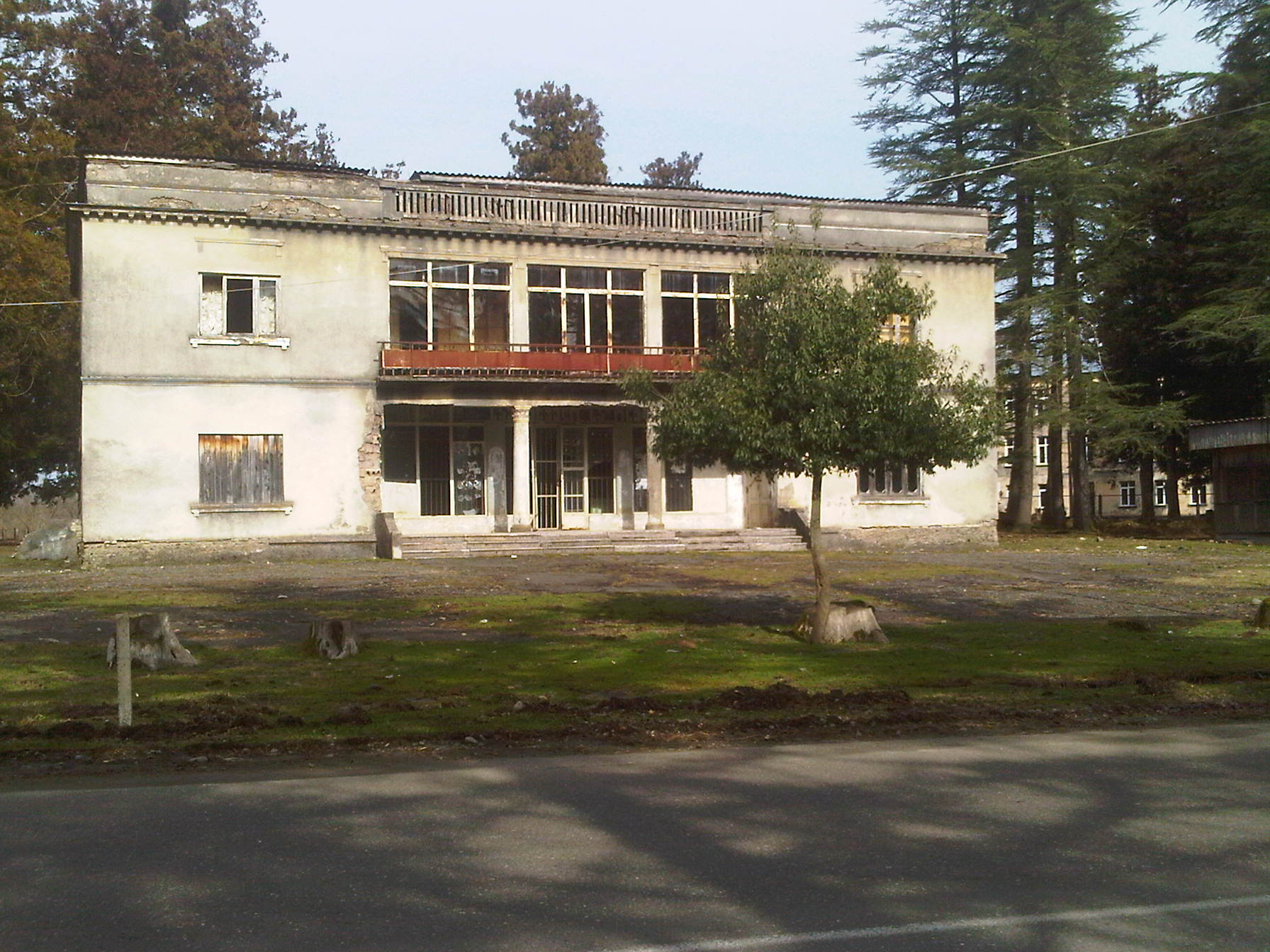

- Location within Georgia Location within Guria
- Coordinates: 41°56′33″N 41°57′28″E
- Country: Georgia
- Mkhare: Guria
- Municipality: Ozurgeti
- Elevation: 70 m (230 ft)

Population (2014)
  - Total: 1,215
- Time zone: UTC+4 (Georgian Time)

Gurianta (Georgian: გურიანთა) is a village in the Ozurgeti Municipality of Guria in western Georgia.
