= Ayrum =

Ayrum Այրում
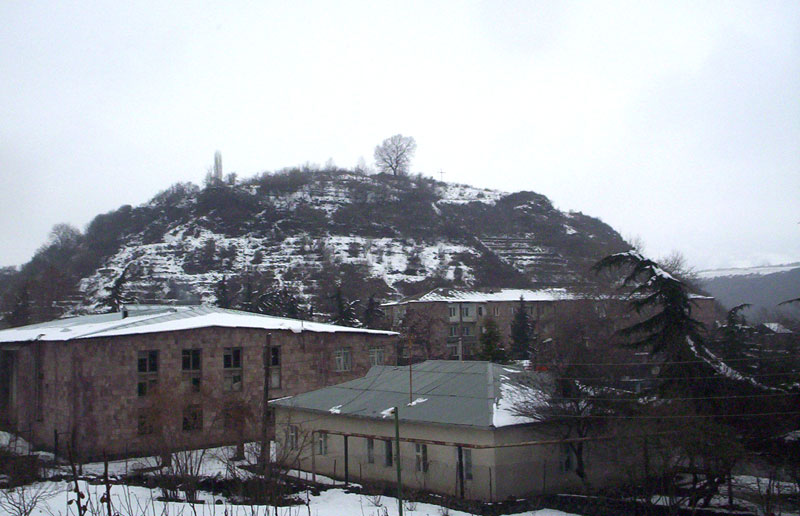
- A view of Ayrum

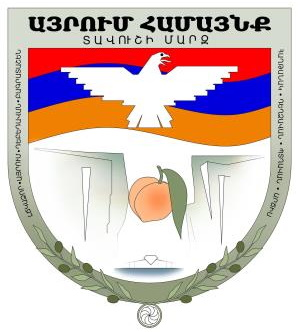
- Coat of arms

- Location within Armenia Location within Tavush
- Coordinates: 41°11′42″N 44°53′33″E
- Country: Armenia
- Province: Tavush
- Municipality: Noyemberyan
- Founded: 1937

Area
  - Total: 1.3 km^{2} (0.50 sq mi)
- Elevation: 550 m (1,800 ft)

Population (2022)
  - Total: 1,740
  - Density: 1,300/km^{2} (3,500/sq mi)
- Time zone: UTC+4 (AMT)

Ayrum (Armenian: Այրում) is an urban settlement in the Noyemberyan Municipality of the Tavush Province of Armenia, located at a road distance of 206 km (128 mi) northeast of the capital Yerevan and 73 km (45 mi) north of the provincial capital Ijevan. It is situated on the shores of Debed river, only 2 km (1 mi) away from the Armenia–Georgia border. As of the 2011 census, Ayrum had a population of 2,126. As of the 2016 official estimate, the population of Ayrum is 2,000. As of the 2022 census, Ayrum has a population of 1,740. The importance of the town is derived from its geographical location as the northeastern gate and railway hub for the entire republic.

== Etymology ==
The word Ayrum means burning in the Armenian language. According to the Soviet Armenian Encyclopedia, the area has been known as Ayrum after being burnt by the enemies long time ago.

According to another theory, the name of the town is derived from the presence of the Ayrum people, a Turkic tribe in the Caucasus. During the late nineteenth and early twentieth centuries, some migrated to Iran and to Turkey.

== History ==
Historically, the area of modern-day Ayrum was part of ancient Gugark; the 13th province of Greater Armenia. Separated by the Debed river, the eastern half of Ayrum was part of the Koghbapor (Armenian: Կողբափոր) canton of the historic province, while the western half belonged to the Dzobopor (Armenian: Ձոբոփոր) canton of the same province.

In 1501-02, most of the Eastern Armenian territories including the historic region of Dzobopor, were swiftly conquered by the emerging Safavid dynasty of Iran led by Shah Ismail I.

The territories of present-day Lori and Tavush along with the neighboring Georgia, became part of the Russian Empire in 1800-01. The territories became an official region of Russia as per the Treaty of Gulistan signed between Imperial Russia and Qajar Persia in October 1813, following the Russo-Persian War of 1804–13. In 1840, the Elizavetpol uezd was formed and most of the territories of Tavush became part of the newly-founded administrative division of the Russian Empire. Later in 1868, the Elizavetpol Governorate was established and Tavush became part of the newly-formed Kazakh uezd of the governorate.

After the short-lived independent Republic of Armenia in 1918-20, the Soviet Red Army entered the Armenian territories on 29 November 1920 and the Armenian Soviet Socialist Republic was officially declared on 2 December 1920. Under the Soviet rule, the settlement of Ayrum was founded in 1937 as a small village called Banavan, within the Noyemberyan raion of Soviet Armenia. It was mainly founded as a labour settlement for the newly-established food canning factory. The village has gradually grown as a centre for food-processing industry and received the status of an urban-type settlement town in 1960.

== Geography ==
Ayrum is located in northeastern Armenia, at a road distance of 206 km (128 mi) northeast of the capital Yerevan and 73 km (45 mi) north of the provincial capital Ijevan. It is situated on the shores of Debed river, only 2 km (1 mi) south of the Armenia-Georgia borderline, and 10 km (6 mi) west of the border with Azerbaijan.

Covering an area of around 1.3 km^{2} (0.5 sq mi), the town is at an elevation of 550 metres (1,804 feet) above sea level.

Ayrum has a mild temperature in summer with an average degree of 24 °C (75 °F). The temperature is quite cold and snowy during winter, with an average degree of 1 °C (34 °F).

== Demographics ==
Historical population
Year	Pop.	±% p.a.
1939	100	—
1959	282	+5.32%
1972	1,982	+16.18%
1979	2,252	+1.84%
1989	2,620	+1.53%
2001	2,351	−0.90%
2011	2,126	−1.00%
2022	1,740	−1.80%

== Economy ==
Ayrum was considered a large centre for the production of canned food during the Soviet years. Currently, the town is home to the "Ayrum Cannery" operating since 1937, and the "Ayrum Fruits" food-processing factory operating since 2014.

Recently, a zeolite processing plant known as Zeolite Pro was opened in Ayrum. The processed zeolites are mainly brought from the nearby mines of Koghb.

== Culture ==
During excavations conducted in the archaeological site located 3 km southwest of Ayrum, the remains of a Bronze Age cyclopean fortress were found, along with small metallic sculptures of a human face and several animals, dating back to the period between the 10th and 7th centuries BC.

The community of Ayrum is served by a house of culture as well as a public library.

== Education ==
Ayrum has a pre-school kindergarten as well as a public education school designated for 700 students. However, the number of the students did not exceed 300 in recent years.

== Administration ==
With the new regulations of the administrative subdivisions of Armenia in 1995, Ayrum was classified as a village (rural settlement) within the Tavush Province. Later in 2006, Ayrum received the status of a town (urban settlement). Following the community mergers in 2016, the municipality of Ayrum was enlarged to include the surrounding villages of Archis, Bagratashen, Debetavan, Deghdzavan, Haghtanak, Lchkadzor and Ptghavan.

== Transportation ==
Ayrum is the northeastern gate of Armenia and the connection point on the railroad that extends between Yerevan in Armenia and Tbilisi in Georgia. Being the country's main railway hub on the border with Georgia, the Ayrum border checkpoint located at the Ayrum railway station, provides visa on arrival to the citizens of European, North American, South American, and many Asian countries.

The M-6 Motorway that connects Yerevan with Georgia also passes through the town of Ayrum.
