= Noyemberyan District =

Noyemberyan District Նոյեմբերյանի շրջան
- District
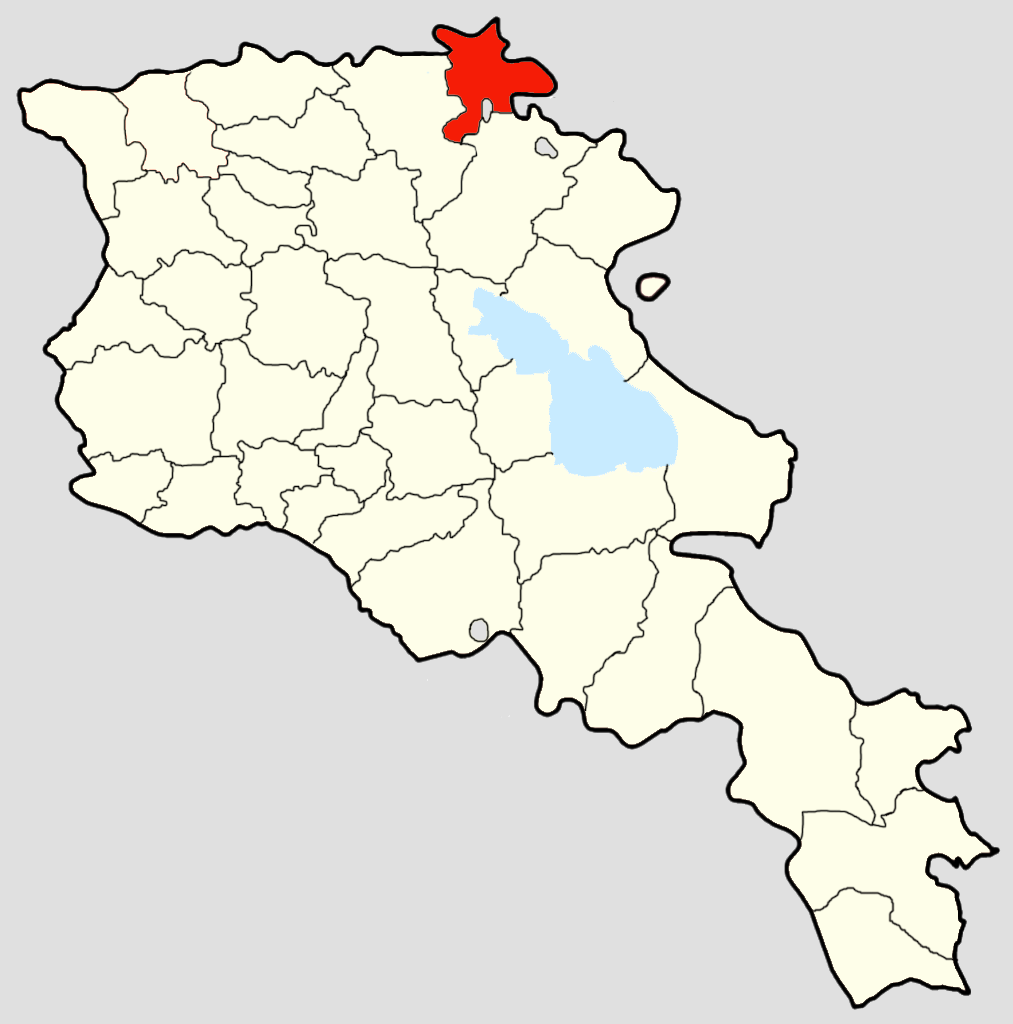
- The Noyemberyan District in Armenia
- Country: Soviet Union Armenia
- Republic: Armenian SSR
- Established: 31 December 1937
- Abolished: 11 April 1995
- Capital: Noyemberyan

Area
  - Total: 538 km^{2} (208 sq mi)

Population (1989)
  - Total: 33,973
  - Density: 63/km^{2} (160/sq mi)

The Noyemberyan District (Armenian: Նոյեմբերյանի շրջան) was a raion (district) of the Armenian Soviet Socialist Republic from 1937 to 1991 and of the Republic of Armenia from 1991 to 1995. It now constitutes the northeastern part of the Tavush Province (marz) of Armenia. Its administrative center was the town of the same name.

It was bordered by the Alaverdi and Ijevan districts of the Armenian SSR to the west and south, respectively, the Marneuli District of the Georgian SSR to the north and the Gazakh District of the Azerbaijan SSR to the east and south. It had an area of 538 square kilometers and a population of 29,700 as of 1987.

== History ==
In 1918–1920, Noyemberyan was a disputed territory between the briefly independent republics of Armenia, Georgia and Azerbaijan. Georgia, which laid claim to the whole Borchaly Uyezd that Noyemberyan was partially a part of, claimed the northwestern Debed Valley, whilst Azerbaijan claimed the remaining southeastern part of the region. Numerous border clashes took place along the border during the Armeno-Georgian and Armenian-Azerbaijani wars.

Prior to the creation of the district on 31 December 1937, the villages of Noyemberyan were originally part of the Ijevan and Alaverdi districts. Jujevan, Baghanis, Voskevan, Koti, Barekamavan and Voskepar were part of the Ijevan District, and before that the province of Dilijan. Noyemberyan (previously Barana), Dovegh, Koghb, Berdavan, Zorakan, Haghtanak, Ayrum, Lchkadzor, Archis, Ptghavan, Deghdzavan, Bagratashen and Debetavan were part of the Alaverdi District. The district and its center were named Noyemberyan in honor of the entry of the Red Army into Armenia in November 1920.

One Azerbaijani-populated village that was located in between the Noyemberyan and Ijevan districts, Ashaghi Askipara, was an exclave of the Gazakh District of the Azerbaijan SSR. The enclave has been controlled by Armenian forces since the outbreak of the First Nagorno-Karabakh War, similarly to the Armenian enclave of Artsvashen which is controlled by Azerbaijani forces.

Geographically, the territory of Noyemberyan consisted of the Tavush, Lori and Debed valleys. A variety of dialects of Armenian are spoken on the territory of the former district. The number of dialects increased in the 1940s, when Armenians from the Tsalka region of Georgia settled in the villages of the Debed Valley. At least two more dialects were added in 1988, when Armenians and some Udis from the villages of Chardakhlu and Vardashen in Azerbaijan respectively settled in the villages of Zorakan (formerly Verin Korplu), Haghtanak, Ptghavan and Debetavan.

== Demographics ==
In 1939, the Noyemberyan District had a population of 20,171, including 16,885 Armenians (83.7%), 2,481 Azerbaijanis (12.3%), and 646 Russians (3.2%). In the administrative capital Noyemberyan, 2,638 (99.4%) of the town's 2,655 residents were Armenians.

Historical population of the Noyemberyan District
Year	Population	Change
1939	20,171	–
1959	23,297	▲15.50%
1970	29,826	▲28.03%
1979	31,536	▲5.73%
1989	33,973	▲7.73%
2001	31,964	▼5.91%
2011	29,346	▼8.19%

== Settlements ==
Noyemberyan District had two urban-type settlements (Noyemberyan and Ayrum). The district's villages were as follows:

- Archis
- Bagratashen
- Barekamavan
- Baghanis
- Berdavan
- Debetavan
- Deghdzavan
- Dovegh
- Haghtanak
- Hoktember
- Jujevan
- Koghb
- Lalvar
- Lchkadzor
- Ptghavan
- Koti
- Voskepar
- Voskevan
- Zorakan

== See also ==
- Districts of the Armenian Soviet Socialist Republic
