= Shamshadin District =

Coordinates: 40°52′51″N 45°23′30″E

Shamshadin District Շամշադինի շրջան
- District
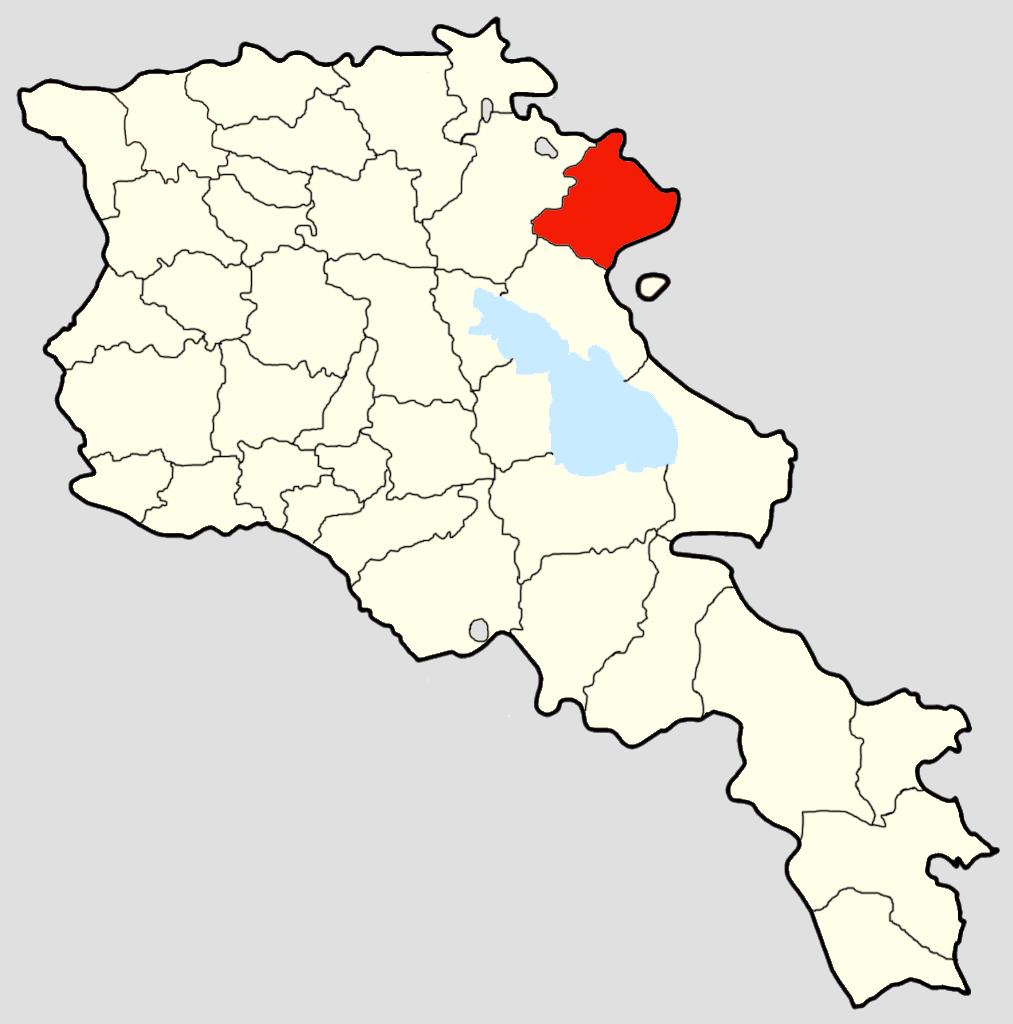
- The Shamshadin District in Armenia
- Country: Armenian Soviet Socialist Republic Armenia
- Established: 24 June 1929
- Abolished: 11 April 1995
- Capital: Berd

Area
  - Total: 829.21 km^{2} (320.16 sq mi)

Population (1989)
  - Total: 34,559
  - Density: 42/km^{2} (110/sq mi)

The Shamshadin District (Armenian: Շամշադինի շրջան) was a raion (district) of the Armenian Soviet Socialist Republic from 1929 and later in 1991 of the Republic of Armenia until its disestablishment in 1995. The Shamshadin district today constitutes a southeastern part of the Tavush Province (marz). Its administrative centre was the town of Berd.

== History ==
The Shamshadin district was formed on the territory of the Armenian SSR on 24 June 1929, originally a part of the Dilijan uezd which had been separated from the tsarist Kazakh uezd in 1921.

Shortly after the breakup of the Soviet Union, the administration of the Republic of Armenia consolidated the Shamshadin, Noyemberyan and Ijevan districts into the larger Tavush Province.

== Villages ==
There were 16 villages in the Shamshadin District:

- Berd
- Aygedzor
- Aygepar
- Artsvaberd
- Varagavan
- Verin Karmiraghbyur
- Movses
- Navur
- Nerkin Karmiraghbyur
- Norashen
- Paravakar
- Tavush
- Chinari
- Chinchin
- Choratan
- Verin Tsaghkavan

== Notable people ==
- Hayk Chobanyan
- Sarkis Ordyan
- Vardan Stepanyan
- Sassun Mkrtchyan
