= Administrative divisions of the Armenian Soviet Socialist Republic =

List of administrative divisions of Armenia from 1929 to 1995

Between 1929 and 1995, Armenia's administrative subdivisions consisted of up to 37 raions (districts, in Armenian shrjan) and 22 cities. Originally formed from the territory of the tsarist uezds (counties) between 24 June 1929 and 1930, the districts of the Armenian Soviet Socialist Republic and later the independent Republic of Armenia were combined on 11 April 1995 into ten provinces known as marzes, in addition to Yerevan which, being the capital of the country, was granted a special administrative status. Prior to the establishment of the raions, Soviet Armenia consisted of nine uezds, three of which (Dilijan, Meghri, and Lori-Pambak) were formed after the Sovietization of Armenia and the 1921 delineation of the South Caucasian republics' frontiers.

== List of uezds (1920–1930) ==
English name	Armenian name	Capital	Area (km^{2})	Population (1926 census)
Leninakan	Լենինականի շրջան	Leninakan (Gyumri)	4,200.3	166,793
Lori-Pambak	Լոռի-Փամբակի շրջան		3,921.2	133,148
Dilijan	Դիլիջանի շրջան	Dilijan	3,589.0	78,665
Ejmiatsin	Էջմիածնի շրջան	Ejmiatsin (Vagharshapat)	2,561.9	114,505
Yerevan	Երևանի շրջան	Yerevan	4,425.2	178,652
Nor Bayazet	Նոր-Բայազետի շրջան	Nor Bayazet (Gavar)	3,225.6	101,570
Daralagyaz	Դարալագյազի շրջան		2,425.4	30,074
Zangezur	Զանգեզուրի շրջան		3,754.5	68,918
Meghri	Մեղրու շրջան	Meghri	742.8	8,139

== List of raions (1930–1995) ==
Location on map of Armenia	English name	Armenian name	Capital	Area (km^{2})	Population (1989 census)	Marz (1995–present)	Est.	Former names	Notes
	Kotayk	Աբովյանի շրջան	Abovyan	846	63,099	Kotayk	1930	Abovyan (1961–1990)	
	Vayk	Ազիզբեկովի շրջան	Vayk	1,173.8	13,680	Vayots Dzor	1931	Pashalu (1931–1935) Azizbekov (1935–1990)	
	Amasia	Ամասիայի շրջան	Amasia	534	6,342	Shirak	1930	Aghbaba (1930–19?)	(Note: Abolished in 1951 and attached to the Ashotsk (Ghukasyan) District; Restored in 1956; Abolished again in 1962; Restored again in 1963.)
	Ani	Անիի շրջան	Maralik	405	23,877	Shirak	1937	Agin (1937–1962)	(Note: Abolished in 1953; Restored in the 1950s.)
	Aparan	Ապարանի շրջան	Aparan	631	21,654	Aragatsotn	1930		
	Aragats	Արագածի շրջան	Tsaghkahovit	382.4	13,401	Aragatsotn	1937	Alagyoz (1937–1951)	(Note: Abolished in 1951 and attached to the Aparan District; Restored in 1972.)
	Ararat	Արարատի շրջան	Vedi	495	64,657	Ararat	1930	Vedi (1930–1968)	(Note: Abolished in 1962; Restored in 1964.)
	Artashat	Արտաշատի շրջան	Artashat	378	73,269	Ararat	1930	Ghamarlu (1930–1945)	
	Artik	Արթիկի շրջան	Artik	533	33,665	Shirak	1930		(Note: Abolished in 1962; Restored in 1964)
	Akhuryan	Ախուրյանի շրջան	Akhuryan	576	38,952	Shirak	1937	Duzkend (1937–1945)	
	Ashtarak	Աշտարակի շրջան	Ashtarak	937	42,701	Aragatsotn	1930		
	Baghramyan	Բաղրամյանի շրջան	Baghramyan	453	20,438	Armavir	1983		
	Vardenis	Վարդենիսի շրջան	Vardenis	1,120	31,282	Gegharkunik	1930	Basargechar (1930–1969)	
	Goris	Գորիսի շրջան	Goris	752	17,979	Syunik	1930		
	Gugark	Գուգարքի շրջան	Vanadzor	770.4	20,368	Lori	1930	Gharakalisa (1930–1935) Kirovakan (1935–1962)	(Note: Abolished in 1962; Restored in 1964.)
	Ashotsk	Ղուկասյանի շրջան	Ashotsk	562	10,668	Shirak	1937	Ghukasyan (1937–1990)	
	Dilijan	Դիլիջան շրջան	Dilijan	477	14,600 (Note: According to the 1939 census.)	Tavush	1930		(Note: Abolished in 1951 and attached to the Ijevan District.)
	Yeghegnadzor	Եղեգնաձորի շրջան	Yeghegnadzor	1,134	36,443	Vayots Dzor	1930	Daralagez (1930–1931) Keshishkend (1931–1935) Mikoyan (1935–1957)	(Note: Abolished in the 1950s; Restored in 1956.)
	Ijevan	Իջևանի շրջան	Ijevan	870	26,937	Tavush	1930		
	Tashir	Կալինինոյի շրջան	Tashir	692	30,645	Lori	1937	Kalinino (1937–1991)	(Note: Abolished in 1953; Restored in 1956; Abolished again in 1962; Restored again in 1964.)
	Kamo	Կամոյի շրջան	Kamo	611	30,555	Gegharkunik	1930	Nor-Bayazet (1930–1959)	(Note: Abolished in 1962; Restored in 1964.)
	Kapan	Ղափանի շրջան	Kapan	1,371	13,243	Syunik	1930	Kafan (1930–1990)	
	Gharabaghlar	Ղարաբաղլար շրջան	Urtsadzor	521	12,832 (Note: According to the 1939 census.)	Ararat	1937		(Note: Abolished in 1951 and attached to the Ararat (Vedi) District.)
	Krasnoselsk	Կրասնոսելսկի շրջան	Chambarak	689	16,428	Gegharkunik	1937		
	Martuni	Մարտունու շրջան	Martuni	1,185	75,866	Gegharkunik	1930		
	Masis	Մասիսի շրջան	Masis	182.2	76,172	Ararat	1937	Zangibasar (1937–1953)	(Note: Abolished in 1953; Restored in 1969.)
	Meghri	Մեղրու շրջան	Meghri	663.6	14,341	Syunik	1930		(Note: Abolished in June 1953; Restored in September 1953.)
	Nairi	Նաիրիի շրջան	Yeghvard	343.7	56,325	Kotayk	1972		
	Noyemberyan	Նոյեմբերյանի շրջան	Noyemberyan	538	33,973	Tavush	1937		(Note: Abolished in 1953; Restored in the 1950s.)
	Armavir	Հոկտեմբերյանի շրջան	Armavir	677	84,314	Armavir	1930	Kurdukulin (1930–1935) Hoktemberyan (1935–1992)	
	Hrazdan	Հրազդանի շրջան	Hrazdan	931	28,903	Kotayk	1930	Akhta (1930–1959)	(Note: Abolished in 1962; Restored in 1964.)
	Sevan	Սևանի շրջան	Sevan	274	18,232	Gegharkunik	1937		
	Sisian	Սիսիանի շրջան	Sisian	1,719	29,768	Syunik	1930		
	Spitak	Սպիտակի շրջան	Spitak	549	8,613	Lori	1937		(Note: Abolished in 1953; Restored in the 1950s.)
	Stepanavan	Ստեփանավանի շրջան	Stepanavan	635	17,474	Lori	1930		
	Talin	Թալինի շրջան	Talin	1,336	39,578	Aragatsotn	1930		
	Tumanyan	Թումանյանի շրջան	Tumanyan	1,121	36,179	Lori	1930	Alaverdi (1930–1969)	
	Shamshadin	Շամշադինի շրջան	Berd	824.4	34,559	Tavush	1929		
	Shahumyan	Շահումյանի շրջան	Shahumyan	65	—	Yerevan	1939	Beria (1939–1953)	(Note: Abolished in 1958 and attached to Yerevan.)
	Etchmiadzin	Էջմիածնի շրջան	Vagharshapat	1,121	79,498	Armavir	1930	Vagharshapat (1930–1945)	

== Cities ==
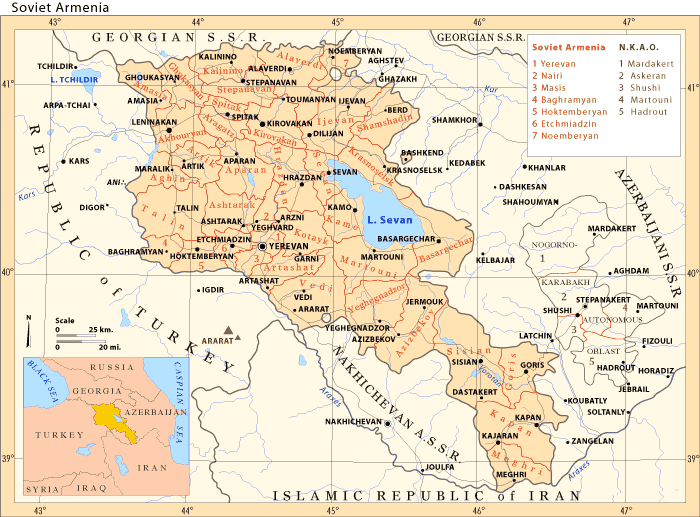
The administrative divisions of the Armenian Soviet Socialist Republic

The six cities that are bolded had the status of a city council.

City	Armenian name	Population (1989 census)	Marz (1995–present)
Abovyan	Աբովյան	58,671	Kotayk
**Alaverdi**	Ալավերդի	26,930	Lori
Ararat	Արարատ	20,105	Ararat
Artashat	Արտաշատ	32,324	Ararat
Artik	Արթիկ	25,126	Shirak
**Ashtarak**	Աշտարակ	24,277	Aragatsotn
Goris	Գորիս	23,795	Syunik
**Jermuk**	Ջերմուկ	10,234	Vayots Dzor
**Dilijan**	Դիլիջան	30,433	Tavush
**Yerevan**	Երևան	1,218,490	Yerevan
Ijevan	Իջեւան	18,681	Tavush
Kamo	Կամո	31,234	Gegharkunik
Kirovakan	Կիրովական	75,616	Lori
Kafan	Կաֆան	42,375	Syunik
Leninakan	Լենինական	122,587	Shirak
Hoktemberyan	Հոկտեմբերյան	46,857	Armavir
Hrazdan	Հրազդան	60,839	Kotayk
Sevan	Սևան	26,951	Gegharkunik
Spitak	Սպիտակ	3,740	Lori
**Stepanavan**	Ստեփանավան	9,894	Lori
Etchmiadzin	Էջմիածին	60,540	Armavir
Charentsavan	Չարենցավան	33,900	Kotayk
