= Armenia–Georgia border =

International border

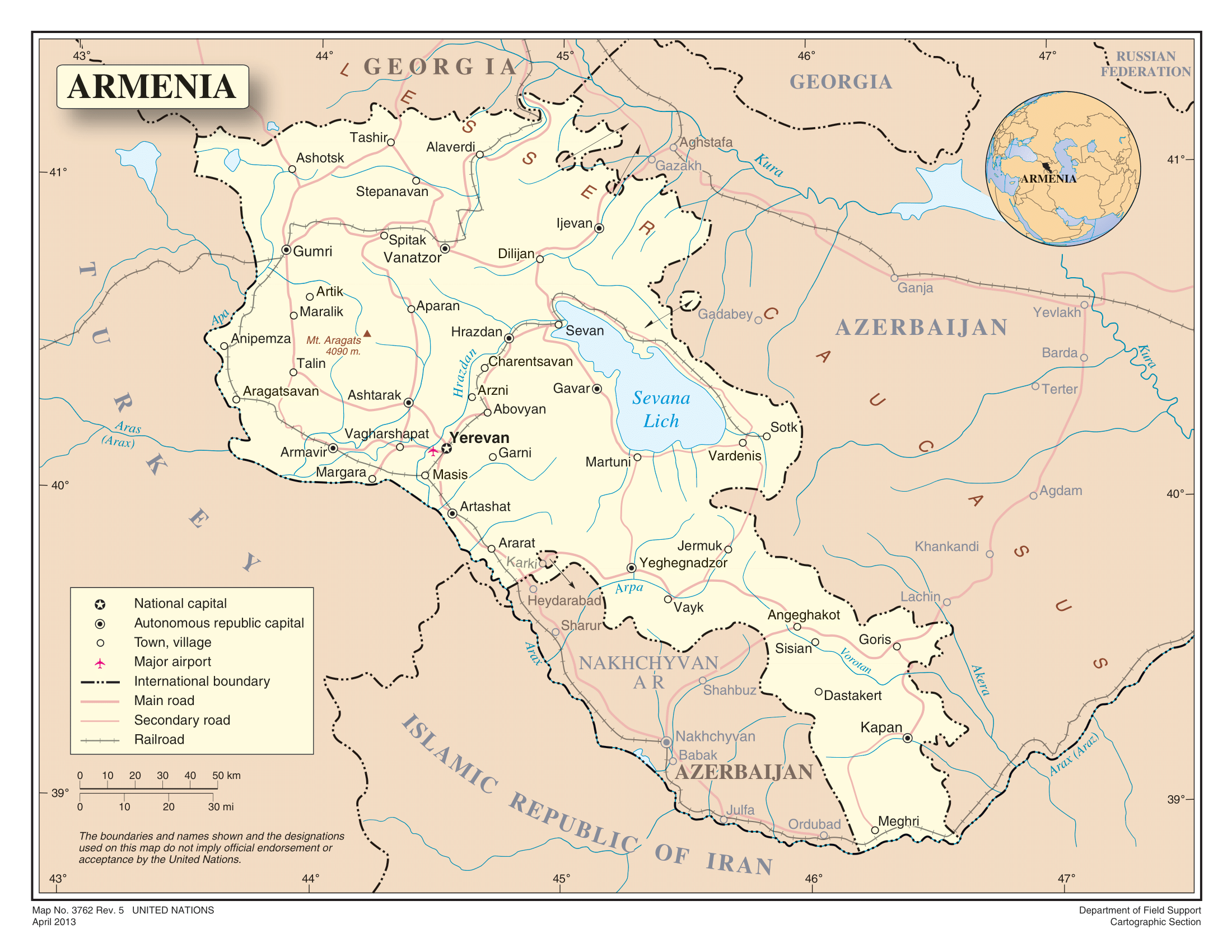
Map of Armenia, with Georgia to the north

Armenian and Georgian boundary markers

The Armenia–Georgia border (Armenian: Հայաստան-Վրաստան սահման, romanized: Hayastan–Vrastan sahman, Georgian: სომხეთ-საქართველოს საზღვარი, romanized: Somkhet–Sakartvelos sazghvari) is the international boundary between Armenia and Georgia. It is 219 km (136 mi) in length and runs from the tripoint with Turkey in the west to the tripoint with Azerbaijan in the east.

== Description ==
The border starts in the west at the tripoint with Turkey and proceeds overland to the tripoint with Azerbaijan via a series of irregular lines and a small section in the east along the Debed river. The western, more mountainous section of the boundary contains two lakes situated quite close to the frontier – Madatapa (in Georgia) and Arpi (in Armenia).

== History ==
During the 19th the Caucasus region was contested between the declining Ottoman Empire, Persia and Russia, which was expanding southwards. Russia formally annexed the eastern Georgian Kingdom of Kartli and Kakheti in 1801, followed by the western Georgian Kingdom of Imereti in 1804. Over the course of the 1800s Russian pushed its southern frontier southwards, at the expense of the Persian and Ottoman Empires. By the Russo-Persian War (1804–1813) and the subsequent Treaty of Gulistan, Russia acquired the bulk of what is now Azerbaijan and the southern Syunik region of modern Armenia. Following the Russo-Persian War (1826–1828) and the Treaty of Turkmenchay Persia was forced to cede the area of Nakhchivan and the rest of modern Armenia. Russia organised its Georgian and Armenian territories into the governorates of Tiflis, Kutaisi and Erivan.

Claimed territory of the Georgian Democratic Republic, with the disputed Lori region in pink

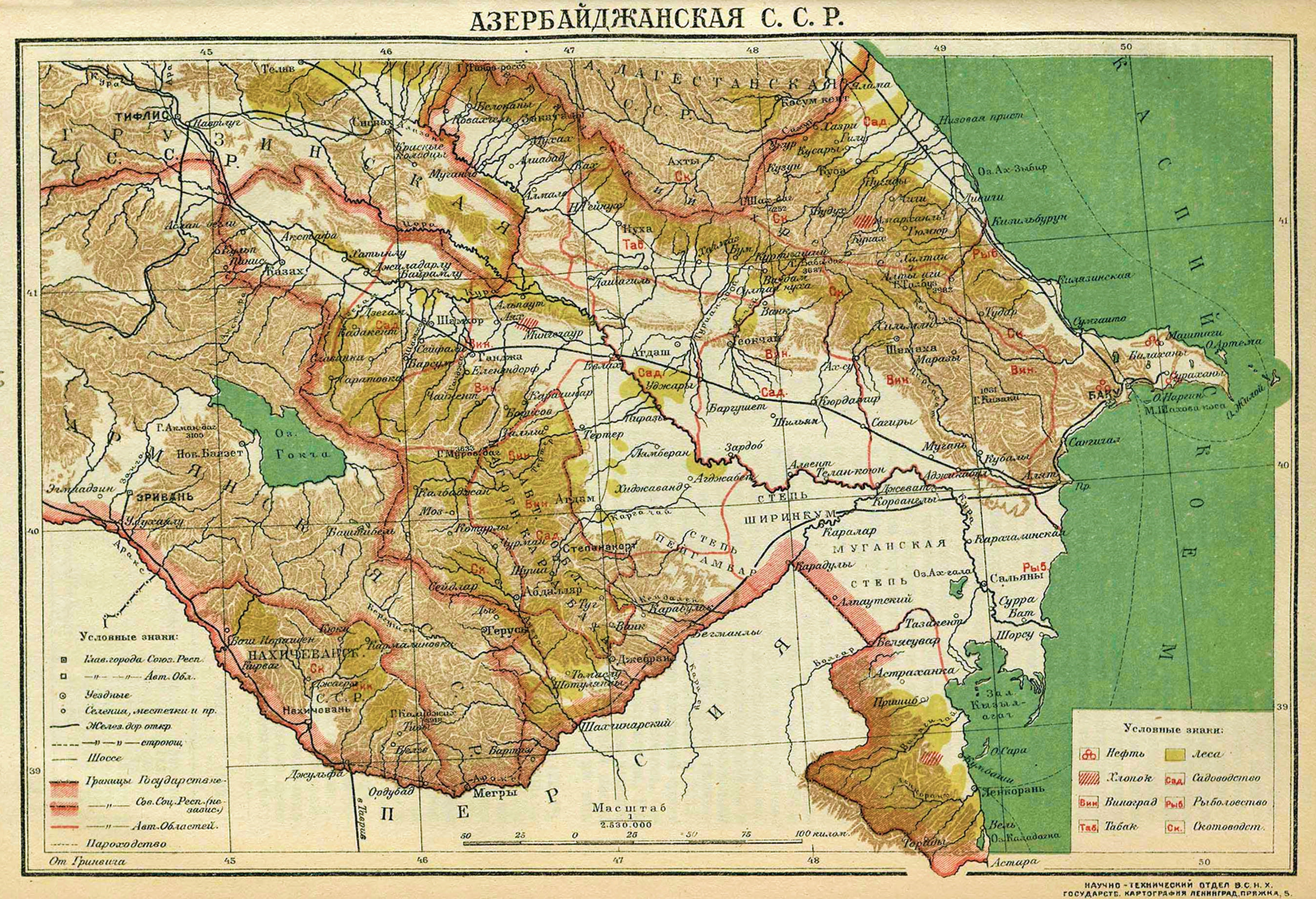
Borders between the Armenian and Georgian Soviet republics in 1926. The northern part of the Borchaly district was part of the Armenian SSR.

Following the 1917 Russian Revolution, the peoples of the southern Caucasus had declared the Transcaucasian Democratic Federative Republic (TDFR) in 1918 and started peace talks with the Ottomans. Internal disagreements led to Georgia leaving the federation in May 1918, followed shortly thereafter by Armenia and Azerbaijan, however the borders between the three republic were contested. The June 1918 Treaty of Batum ended hostilities between the TDFR and the Ottoman Empire. When the Ottomans pulled out of the area of modern Lori Province in October 1918 the area became disputed between Armenia and Georgia, the bulk of which had been the Borchalo and Akhalkalaki uyezds of the former Tiflis governorate. Georgia stated that the southern limits of the former Tiflis governorate should form the border, whereas Armenia said that the boundary should be redrawn so as to reflect the ethnic situation on the ground. After failed peace talks to settle the frontier issue, clashes broke out in October, followed by more stalled peace talks and a short war in December. A ceasefire was brokered by the British under William Montgomerie Thomson on 17 January 1919 and the disputed area was declared a neutral zone pending further peace talks. Thereafter, both Armenia and Georgia pushed into the Kars area of modern eastern Turkey, annexing lands and causing further disputes between over ownership of territory.

The issue was rendered moot when in 1920 Russia's Red Army invaded Azerbaijan and Armenia, ending the independence of both, followed in February–March 1921 by Georgia. Turkey took the opportunity to wrest back lands in the east from Armenia, and Georgia occupied the Lori neutral zone with Armenian approval, so as to prevent it falling into Turkish hands. The USSR's border with Turkey was finalised in October 1921 via the Treaty of Kars, thus fixing the western limit of the Armenia–Georgia border. When the Soviets had established a degree of firm control in the area in early 1921 they sponsored a final border delimitation between Armenia and Georgia, splitting the Lori neutral zone in two (mostly in Armenia's favour) and fixing the border at its current location, an arrangement finalised on 6 November 1921. In 1922 all three states were incorporated into the Transcaucasian SFSR within the USSR, before being separated in 1936.

The boundary became an international frontier in 1991 following the dissolution of the Soviet Union and the independence of its constituent republics. In 1994 the two countries began work on delimiting their border. There is a large Armenian minority in Georgia, concentrated especially in the border province of Samtskhe–Javakheti where they form an at times aggrieved majority. However neither the Armenian or Georgian government have pressed for a rectification of the old Soviet-era border between them.

== Settlements near the border ==
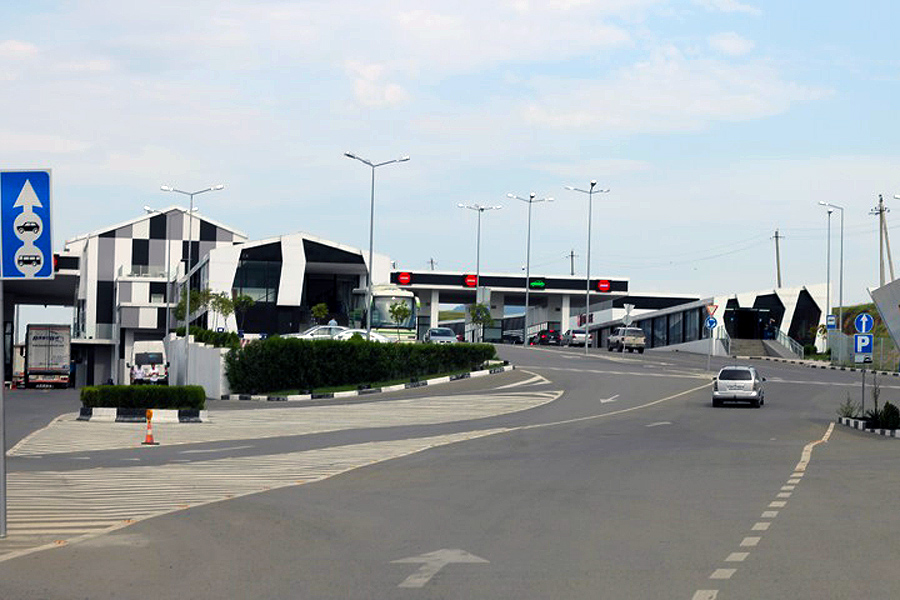
Sadakhlo checkpoint

=== Armenia ===
- Bavra
- Tashir
- Dzyunashogh
- Metsavan
- Gogavan
- Apaven
- Sarchapet
- Alaverdi
- Jiliza
- Ayrum
- Haghtanak
- Ptghavan
- Bagratashen
- Debetavan

=== Georgia ===
- Gorelovka
- Irganchai
- Dmanisi
- Akhkerpi
- Sadakhlo
- Shaumiani

== Border crossings ==
The following border crossings operate between Armenia and Georgia:

- Bagratashen (ARM) – Sadakhlo (GEO)
- Gogavan (ARM) – Guguti (GEO)
- Privolnoye (ARM) - Akhkerpi (GEO)
- Bavra (ARM) – Ninotsminda (GEO)

== See also ==
- Armenia–Georgia relations
