= Gogavan =

Gogavan Գոգավան
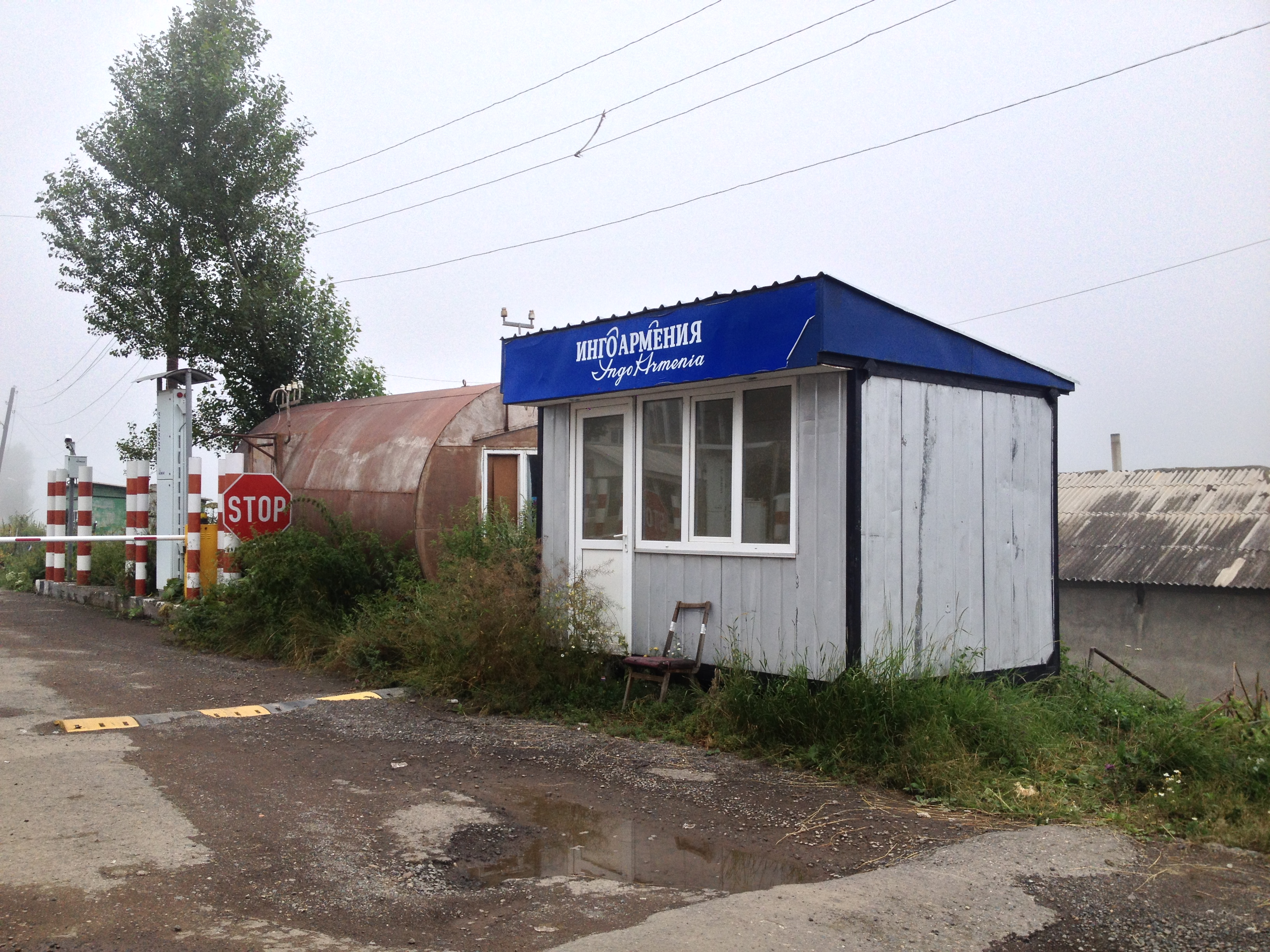

- Location within Armenia
- Coordinates: 41°12′N 44°19′E
- Country: Armenia
- Marz (Province): Lori Province
- Elevation: 1,500 m (4,900 ft)

Population (2011)
  - Total: 51
- Time zone: UTC+4 ( )

Gogavan (Armenian: Գոգավան; formerly, Demurchilar) is a village in the Lori Province of Armenia on the Armenia–Georgia border.

== Sources ==
- Gogavan at GEOnet Names Server
- Report of the results of the 2001 Armenian Census, Statistical Committee of Armenia
