= Apaven =

Apaven Ապավեն
- Location within Armenia
- Coordinates: 41°12′N 44°21′E
- Country: Armenia
- Marz (Province): Lori Province
- Elevation: 1,700 m (5,600 ft)

Population (2011)
  - Total: 85
- Time zone: UTC+4
  - Summer (DST): UTC+5

Apaven (Armenian: Ապավեն; Azerbaijani: Sarıyar) is a village in the Lori Province of Armenia by the Armenia–Georgia border. The village was populated by Azerbaijanis before the exodus of Azerbaijanis from Armenia after the outbreak of the Nagorno-Karabakh conflict.
