= Bavra =

Bavra Բավրա
- Location within Armenia Location within Shirak
- Coordinates: 41°07′10″N 43°48′31″E
- Country: Armenia
- Province: Shirak
- Municipality: Ashotsk
- Elevation: 2,150 m (7,050 ft)

Population (2011)
  - Total: 490
- Time zone: UTC+4

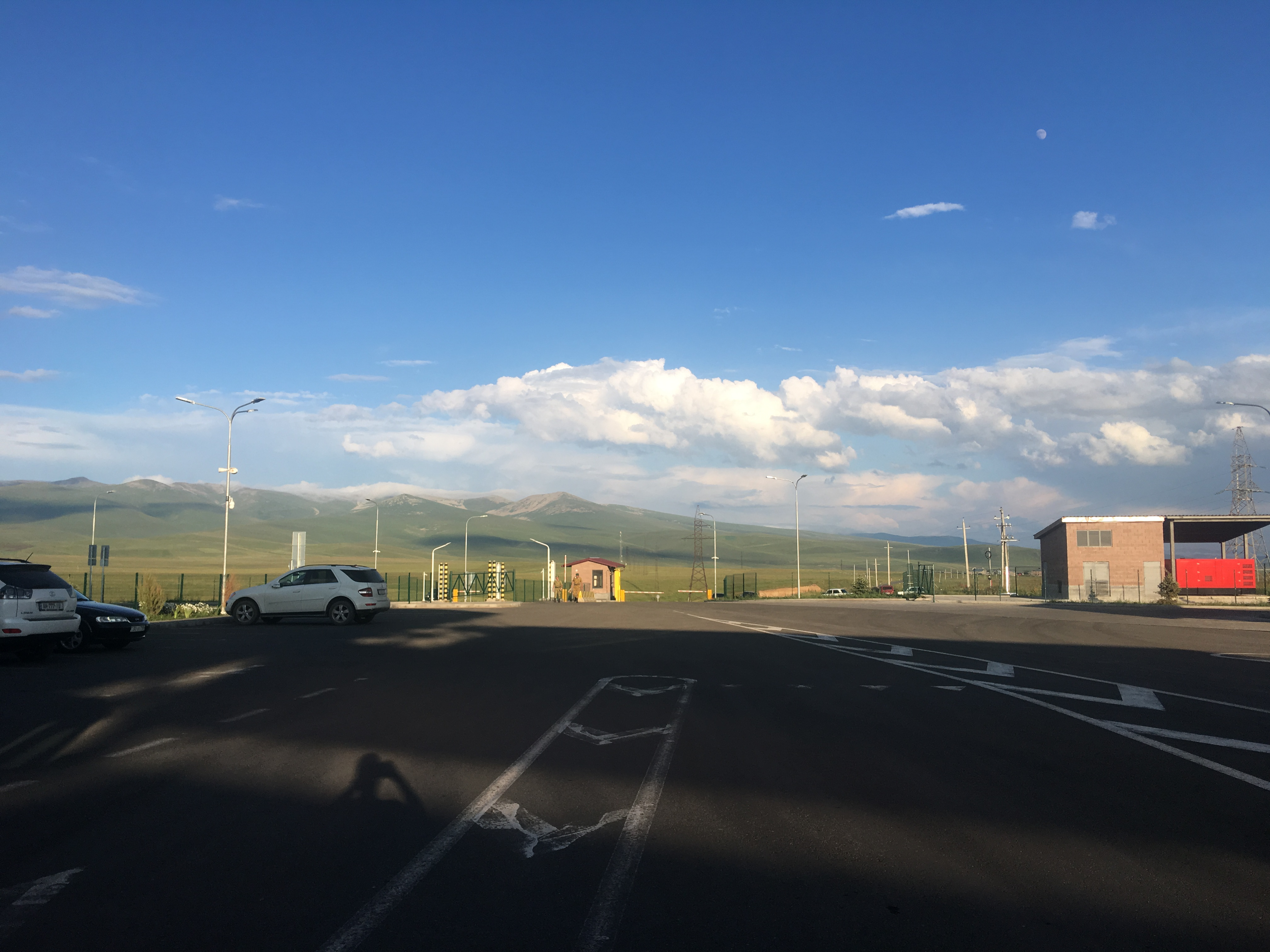
A Checkpoint in Bavra

Bavra (Armenian: Բավրա) is a village in the Ashotsk Municipality of the Shirak Province of Armenia. The Statistical Committee of Armenia reported its population was 490 as per the 2011 census, down from 538 reported at the 2001 census.

The inhabitants of the village are mainly followers of the Armenian Catholic Church. The Surp Nshan Armenian Catholic church of the village was consecrated in December 2012, following a construction period of 5 years.

Bavra is one of three border gates between Armenia and neighboring Georgia. The new border checkpoint complex in Bavra was opened on 1 October 2017, with the presence of president Serzh Sargsyan.

== Demographics ==
The population of the village since 1926 is as follows:

Historical population
Year	Pop.	±% p.a.
1897	262	—
1926	205	−0.84%
1970	560	+2.31%
1979	562	+0.04%
2001	538	−0.20%
2011	490	−0.93%

|2001 |538 |- |2011 |490 |}
