= Sarchapet =

Sarchapet Սարչապետ
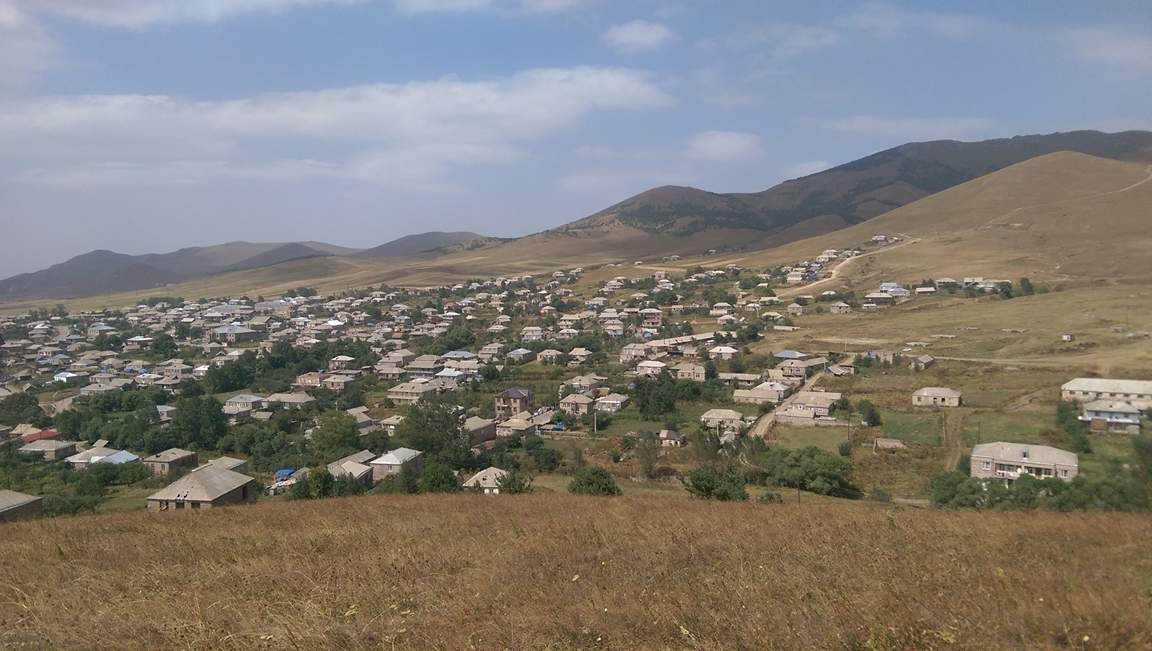
- Sarchapet

- Location within Armenia
- Coordinates: 41°11′57″N 44°23′07″E
- Country: Armenia
- Marz (Province): Lori Province
- Elevation: 1,700 m (5,600 ft)

Population (2011)
  - Total: 2,127
- Time zone: UTC+4 ( )
  - Summer (DST): UTC+5

Sarchapet (Armenian: Սարչապետ), is a village in the Lori Province of Armenia, near the border with Georgia.

Sarchapet Population 2100. Territory- 23.9 km^{2} The community was established in the 1820s and 1830s. Inhabitants mainly are migrants from Mush and Alashkert, Western Armenia, who migrated during Russian−Persian war in 1826-28 and moved to Eastern Armenia. Such a group came near the mountain Lokh, as it is told, to pass the woods. It is told that the wheel of the coach was broken and the family settled at the foot of the second queen Lokh (after Lalvar), and in the northern part it is bordered by Georgia. It is worth of importance the name of the village. There is no explanation for it. Near the village benefition is being built a church. There is church which is closed (1913). The relief is mountainous, erosion is seen here; summers are mild, winters- cold. Winter lasts for 202 days, summers- 163. Average temperature is 3.6oC, and the highest-+28 o C -30 o C. Annual precipitations are from 700 to 720 mm. The lands are on 30-40ï‚° inclination. Fruitfulness is low because of bad geographical position and unfavorable weather. Height from sea level is 1705m. Distance from the regional centre is 70 km, from the previous district centre- 15 km. The community is mainly specialized in growing of potato, wheat and barley. This production depends on the caprices of the nature. It is still possible to gather some harvest in rainy years, but in drought years villagers lose 75% of the harvest. Those who are occupied with cattle-breeding, produce milk and meat. The village has a secondary school. The community had a church built in 1913, which is semi-destroyed now. The new church of the community is semi-built, the beneficiary of which is a businessman from Sarchapet, who lives in Russian Federation. There is a chapel on the northern part of the village on the mountain Lokh, where is celebrated the holiday of Hambardzum.
