= Akhkerpi =

Akhkerpi ახკერპი
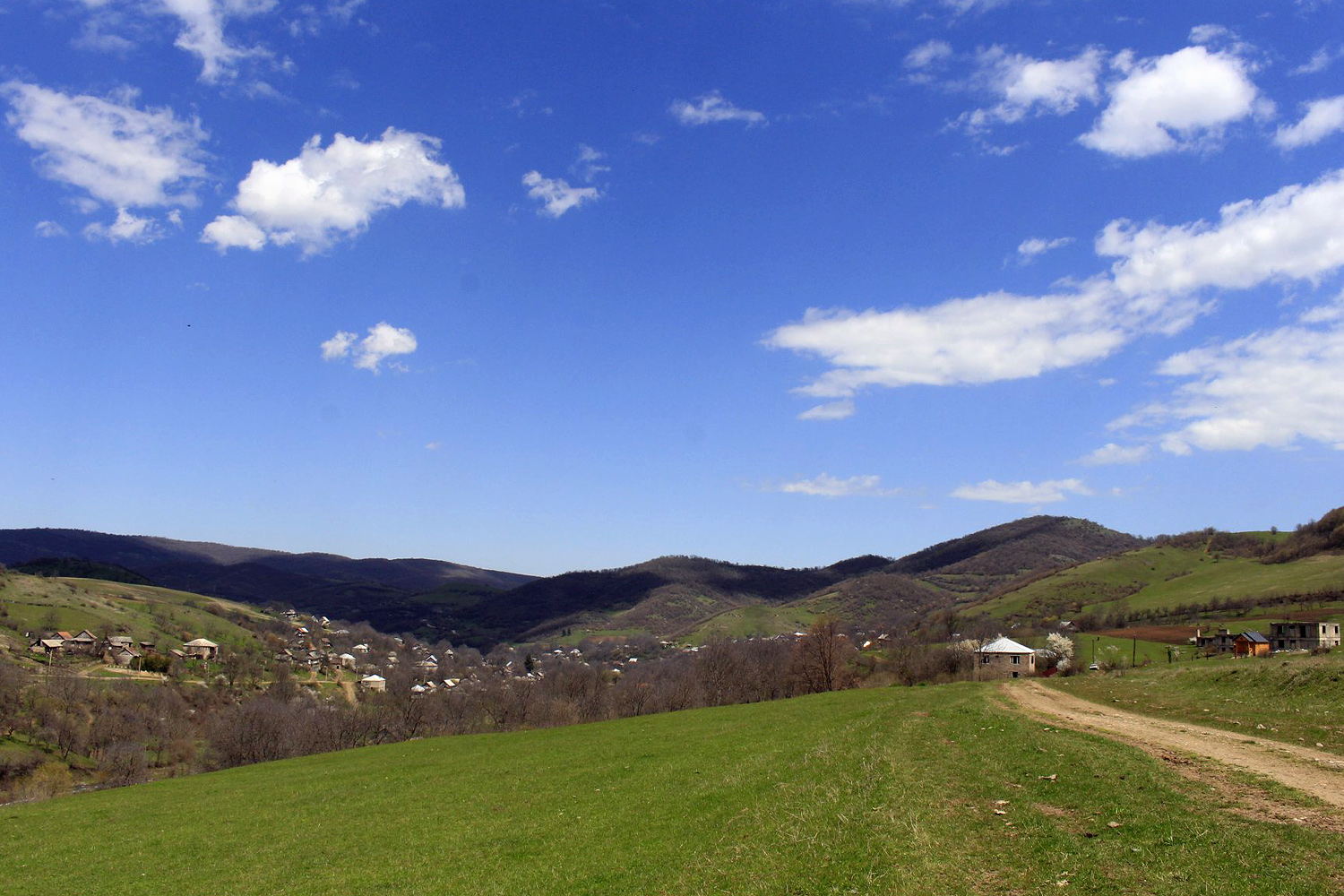

- Location within Georgia Location within Kvemo Kartli
- Coordinates: 41°13′09″N 44°34′35″E
- Country: Georgia
- Mkhare: Kvemo Kartli
- Municipality: Marneuli
- Elevation: 1,007 m (3,304 ft)

Population (2014)
  - Total: 610
- Time zone: UTC+4 (Georgian Time)

Akhkerpi (Georgian: ახკერპი) is a village in Georgia’s Kvemo Kartli region, located in the extreme southwestern part of Marneuli Municipality at the border with Armenia. The village is about 34 kilometres (21 mi) southwest of the municipal center Marneuli and 56 kilometres (35 mi) south of capital Tbilisi. Achkerpi is the center of the eponymous administrative community (თემი, temi) that includes the nearby villages of Chanakhchi and Verkhviani. (Note: Until 21 May 2019 the village was called Ulyanovka (ულიანოვკა).) Achkerpi has a vehicular border crossing with Armenia, which is the least used border checkpoint in Georgia with 133 incoming foreign travellers in 2019.

In the border area with Armenia a few religious-cultural heritage sites are claimed by both countries, which has led to friction between the Georgian and Armenian churches.

== Demography ==
According to the last census of 2014, the village of Achkerpi had 610 residents. Two of the three villages that make up the administrative Achkerpi community are mono-ethnic Armenian except for a few Georgians. The settlement of Verkhviani is populated by four ethnic Georgians.

Population community (temi) Akhkerpi
	2002	2014
Akhkerpi (temi)	977	▼862
Akhkerpi	742	▼610
Chanakhchi	235	▲248
Verkhviani	0	▲4
Data: Census 2002 and 2014 Note: (Note: The 2014 census found an inexplicable gap with the data from the national statistical office Geostat. UN-assisted research has found the 2002 census was inflated by about 8-9 percent. See, "1. Introduction", Page 1.)

== Sights ==
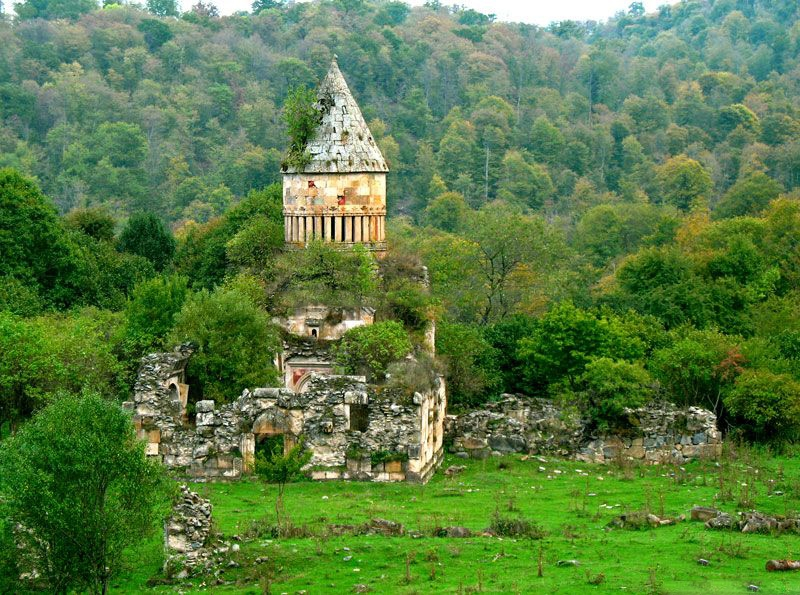
Khorakert Monastery

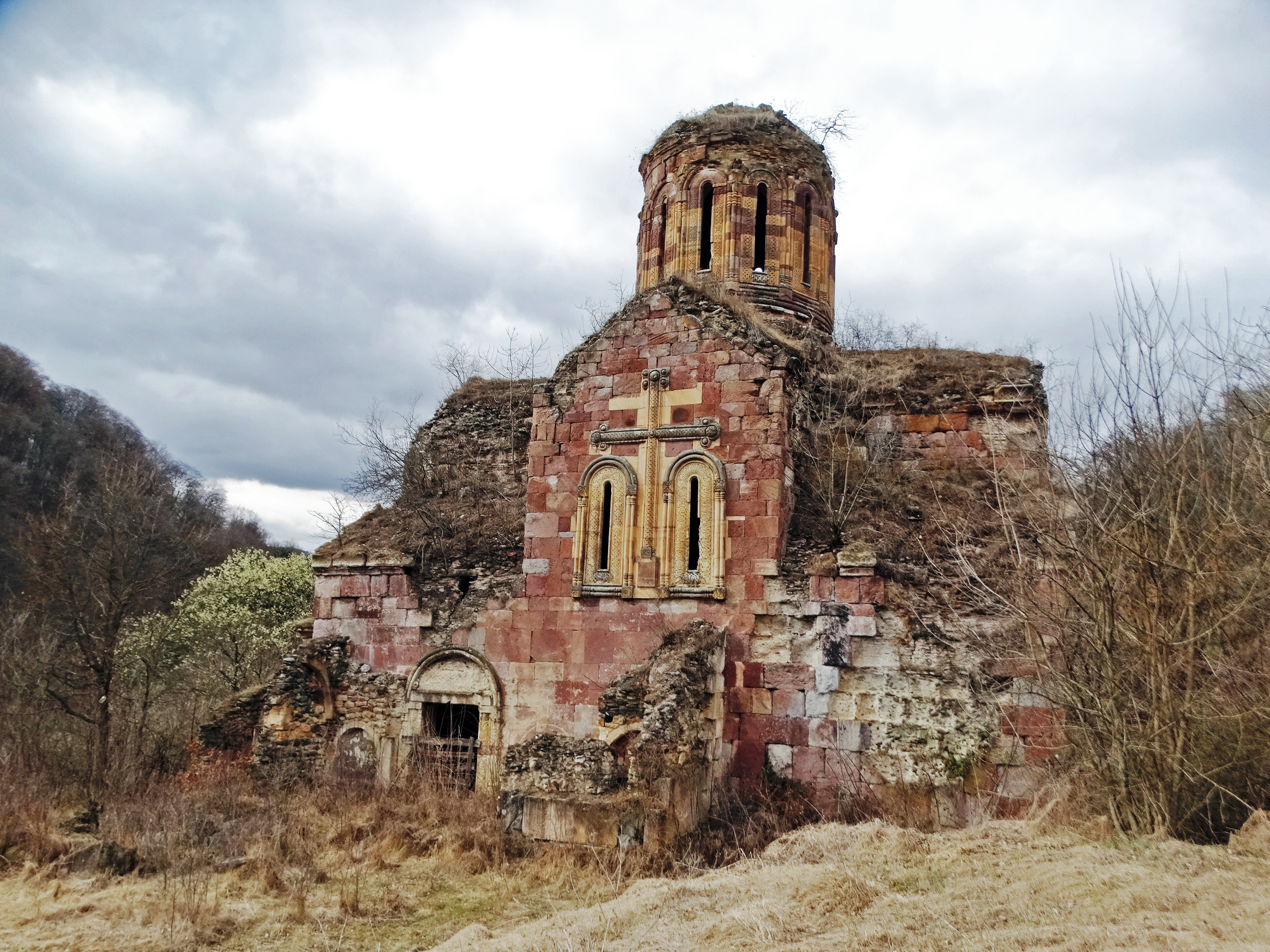
Khuchap Monastery

Several religious-cultural monuments can be found near Akhkerpi, two of which are located in the border area with Armenia and are claimed by both countries. This has led to border disputes in the past.

- Khorakert Monastery (Georgian: ხორაკერტი, romanized: khorak'ert'i; Armenian: Խորակերտ, romanized: Khorakert). This is a 12th-13th century monastic complex with church in the Georgian-Armenian border area, roughly 2 kilometers south of the village of Chanakhchi on the left side of the Shulaveri River. On the site the remains of two small 10th century Georgian hall churches can be found as well. Khorakert is only accessible from the Georgian side via Chanakhchi.
- Khujabi (Georgian: ხუჯაბი, romanized: khujabi) or Khuchap (Armenian: Խուճապ, romanized: Khuchap) Monastery. This is a 13th century monastery with a basilica in the Georgian-Armenian border area near Akhkerpi. The site is disputed between the two countries. In 2005, a Georgian camera crew came under fire by Armenian border guards, and the site has been effectively under Armenian control ever since.
- Ruines of Our Lady Church in Verkhviani. The 17th century church is located at the local cemetery. Three walls are still partly standing. In 2015, it was placed on the list of protected cultural heritage. In the same village, a late medieval stone arch bridge spanning the 10-metre deep gorge of a local stream was declared protected cultural heritage in 2015.

== Transport and border crossing ==
Akhkerpi is relatively isolated, at the end of the route of domestic importance Sh37 from Sadakhlo, the village's only link with the rest of Georgia. This road ends at the Armenian border and continues from there H34 (Հ34) to Privolnoye and Stepanavan. It is Georgia's smallest and least used border crossing, with 133 arriving (foreign) travelers in 2019.
