= Khuchap Monastery =

Monastery in Armenia

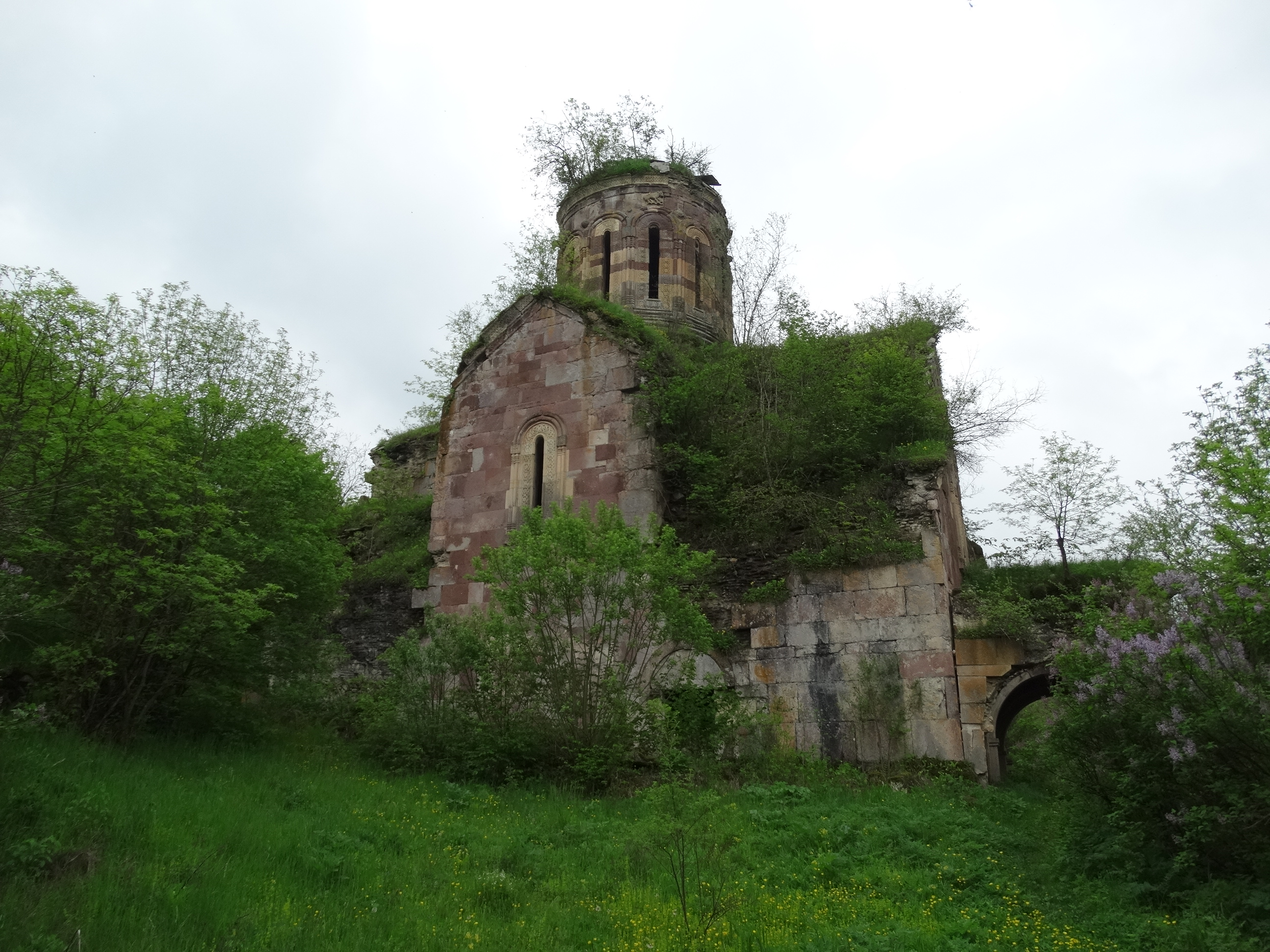
- Khuchap Monastery

- Location within Armenia

Religion
- Affiliation: Armenian Apostolic Church

Location
- Location: Lori region, Armenia
- Interactive map of Khuchap Monastery
- Coordinates: 41°12′06″N 44°34′03″E

Architecture
- Type: Church
- Style: Tetraconch
- Completed: 12-13th AD

Khuchap Monastery (Armenian: Խուճապ, romanized: Xučap) or Khujabi Monastery (Georgian: ხუჯაბი, romanized: khujabi) is a monastery dedicated to Our Lady of Iviron. It is situated in Privolnoye, a village in the Lori Province of Armenia, near the border with Georgia.

Despite its geographic circumstances, Georgian authorities maintain that the monastery is situated in the Marneuli Municipality near the village of Akhkerpi.

Apart from the main church, Khuchap Monastery also consists of a gavit and several ruined buildings.
