= Deghdzavan =

Village in Tavush, Armenia

Deghdzavan Դեղձավան
- Location within Armenia Location within Tavush
- Coordinates: 41°14′N 44°56′E
- Country: Armenia
- Province: Tavush
- Municipality: Noyemberyan

Population (2011)
  - Total: 287
- Time zone: UTC+4 (AMT)

Deghdzavan (Armenian: Դեղձավան) is a village in the Noyemberyan Municipality of the Tavush Province of Armenia.

== History ==
Established in 1973, Deghdzavan was initially incorporated within the Archis region of Noyemberyan.
