= Jiliza =

Jiliza Ջիլիզա
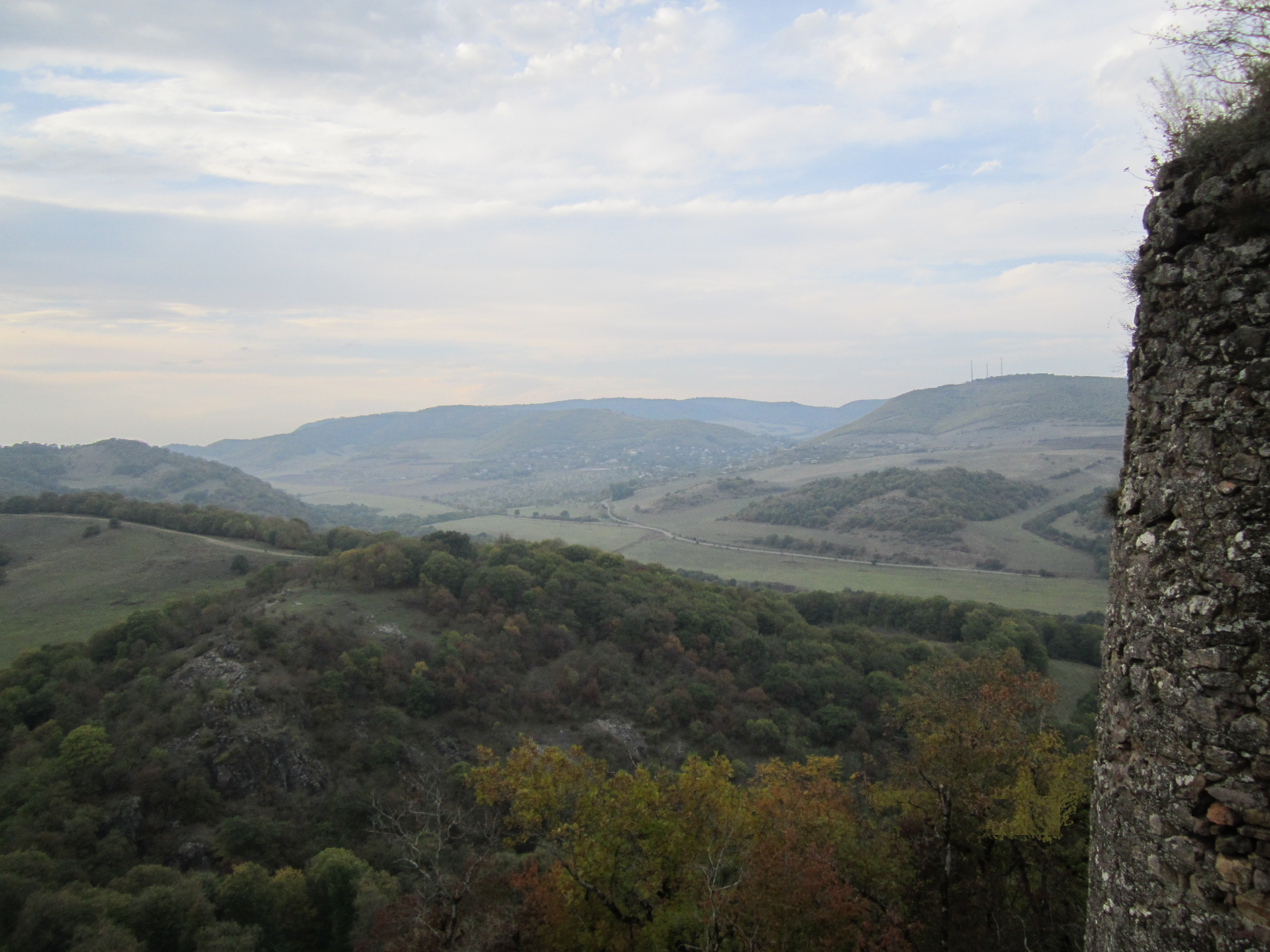

- Location within Armenia
- Coordinates: 41°12′56″N 44°40′13″E
- Country: Armenia
- Province: Lori
- Elevation: 1,050 m (3,440 ft)

Population (2011)
  - Total: 136
- Time zone: UTC+4 (AMT)

Jiliza (Armenian: Ջիլիզա) is a village in the Lori Province of Armenia.

== Gallery ==
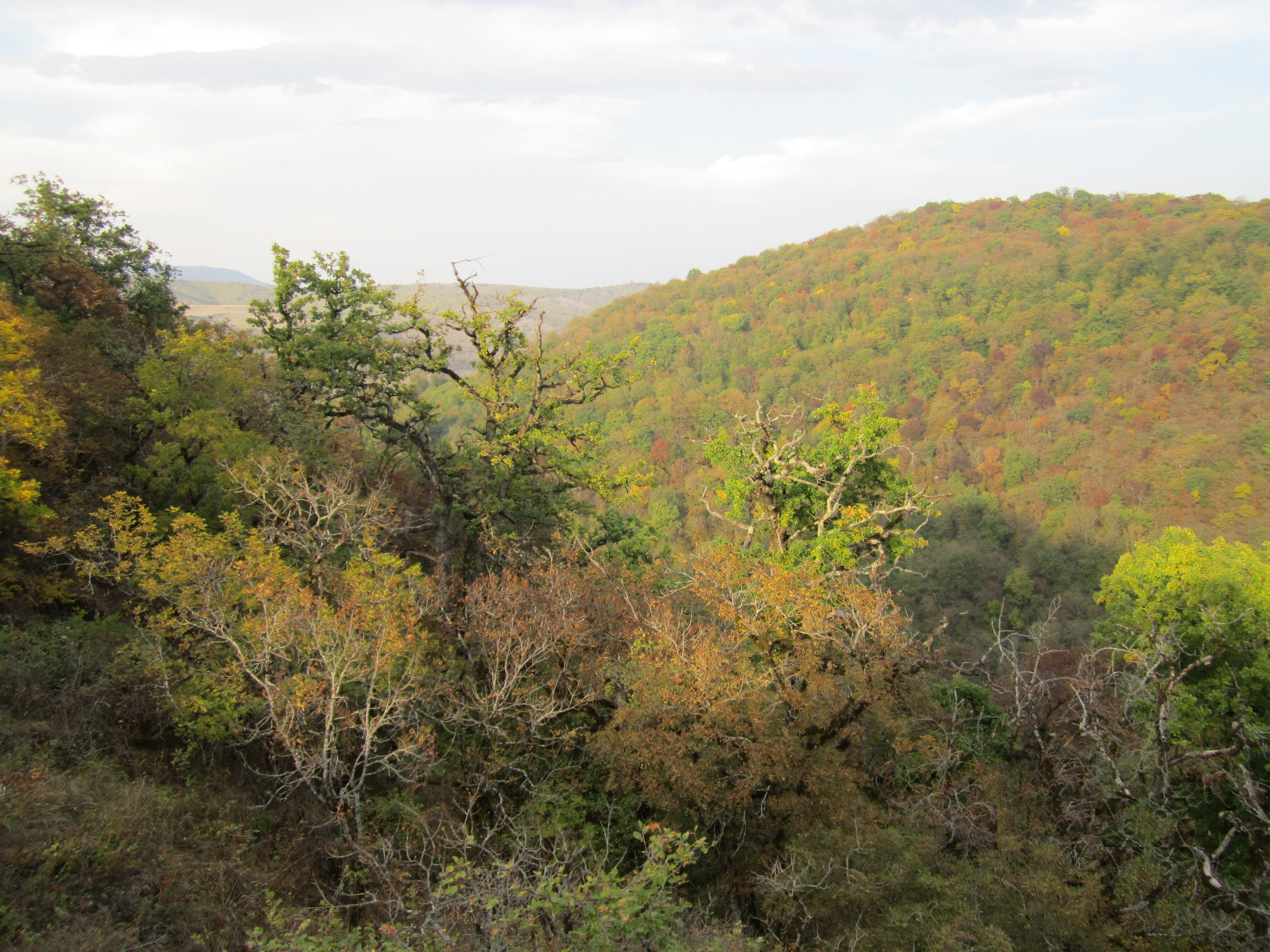

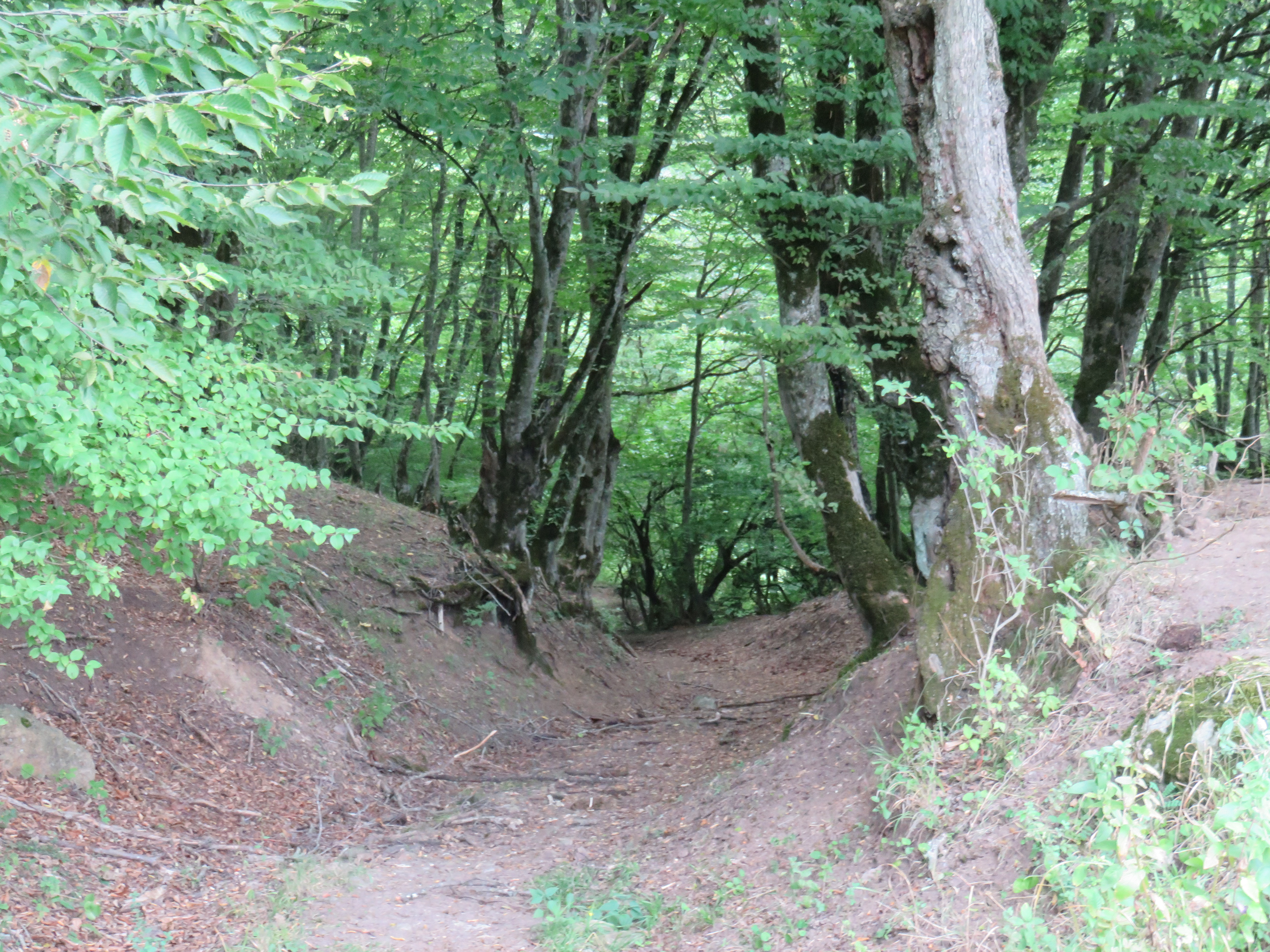

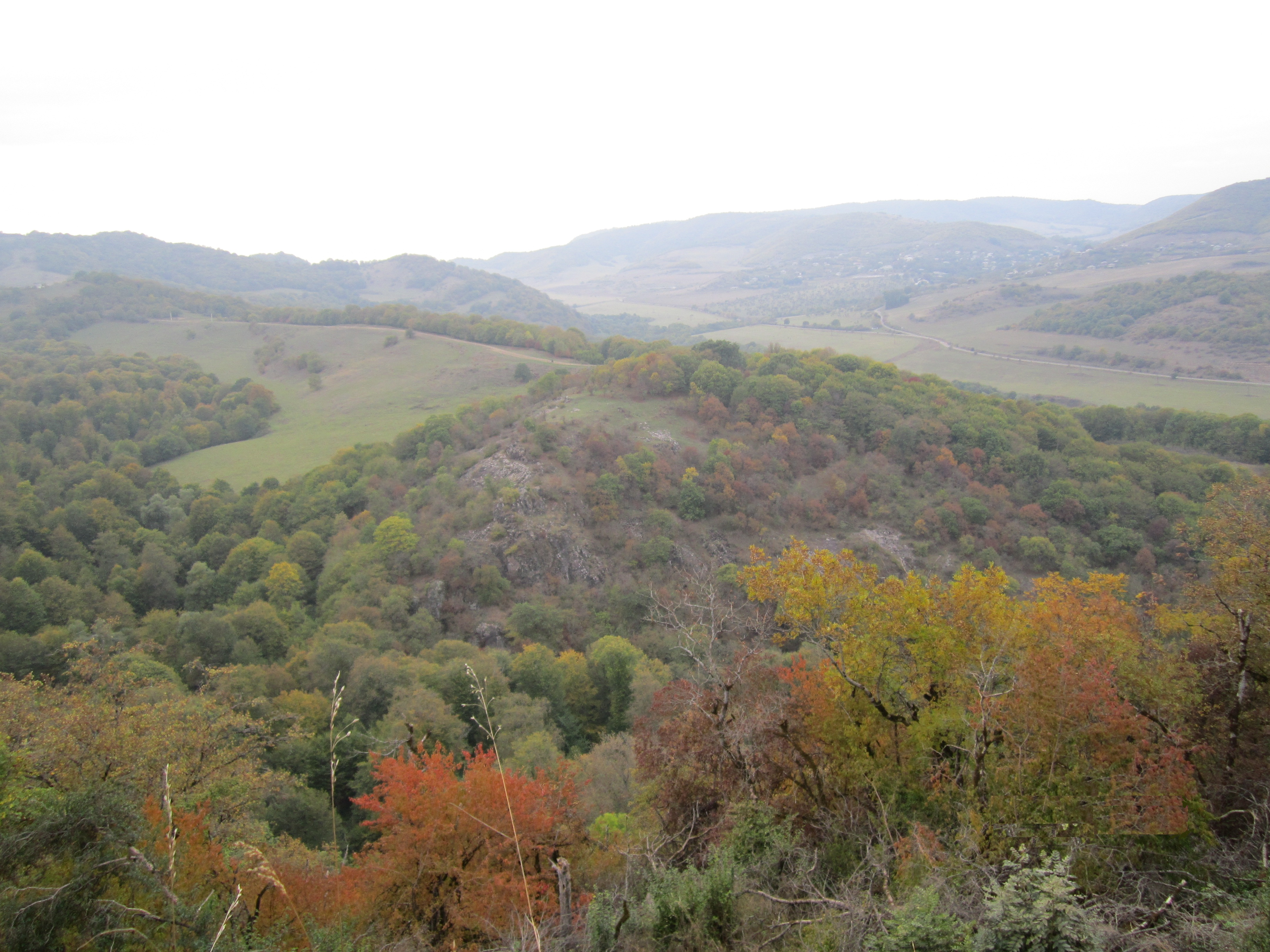

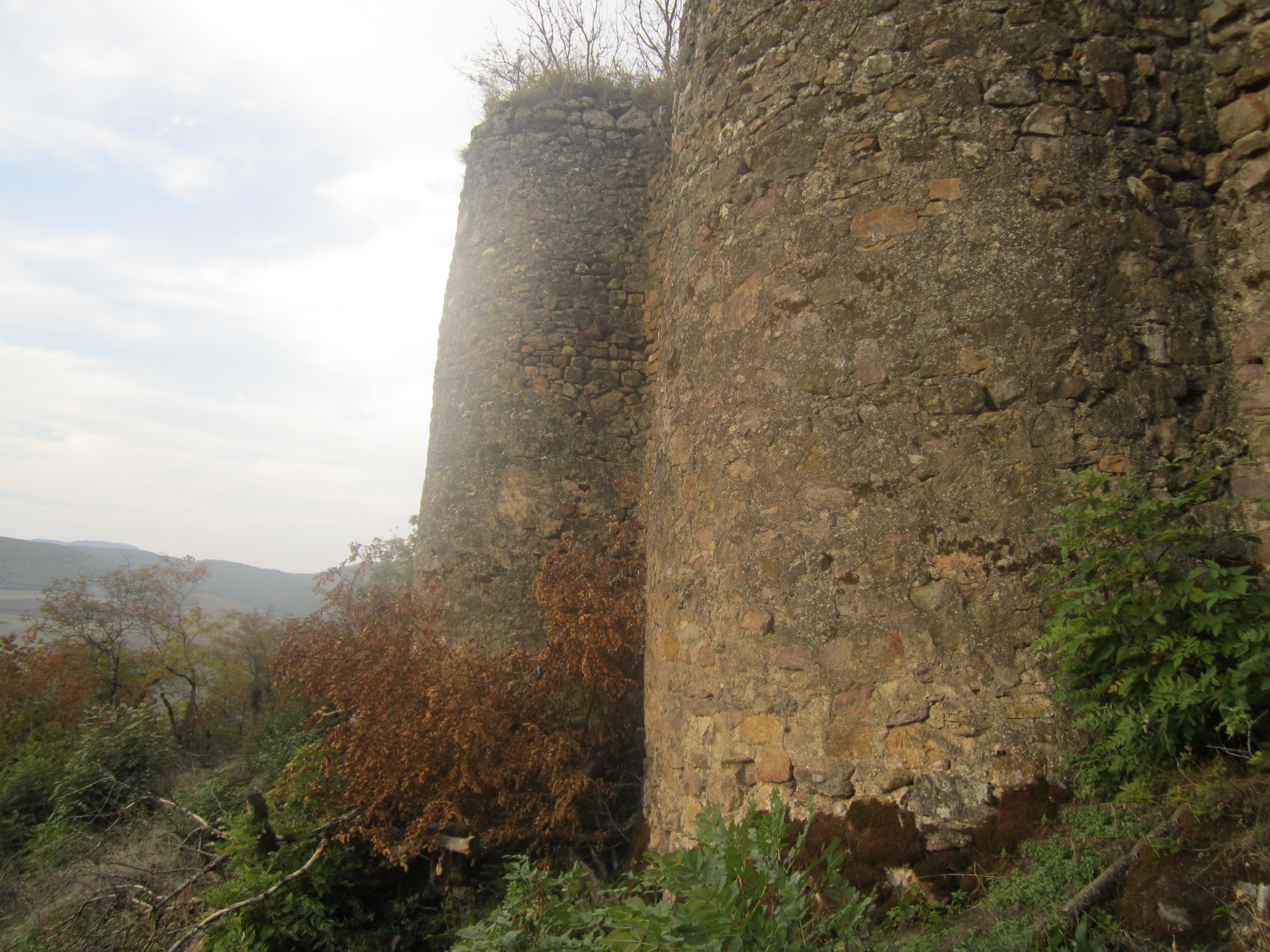

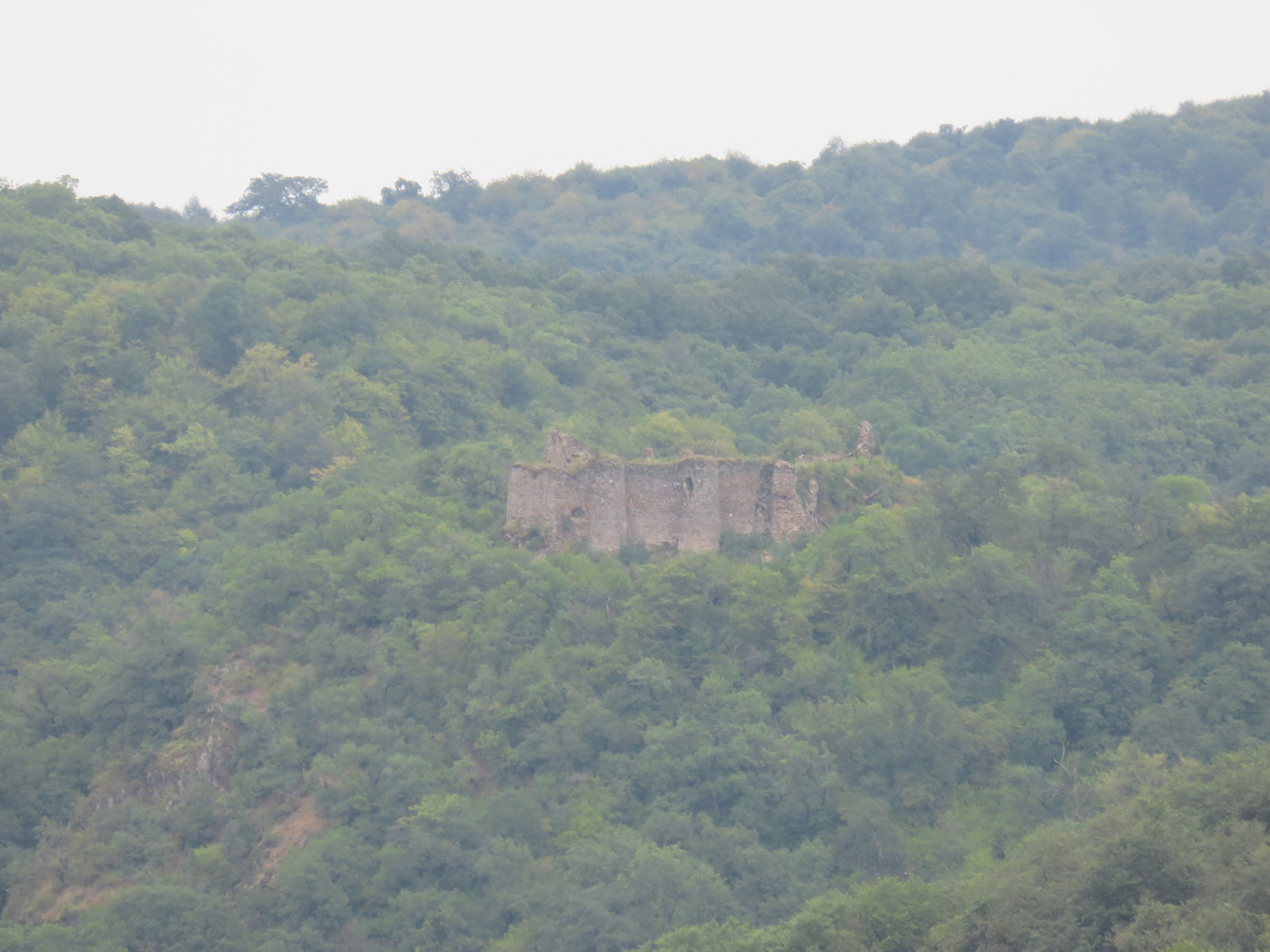
