= Tsaghkahovit =

Tsaghkahovit Ծաղկահովիտ
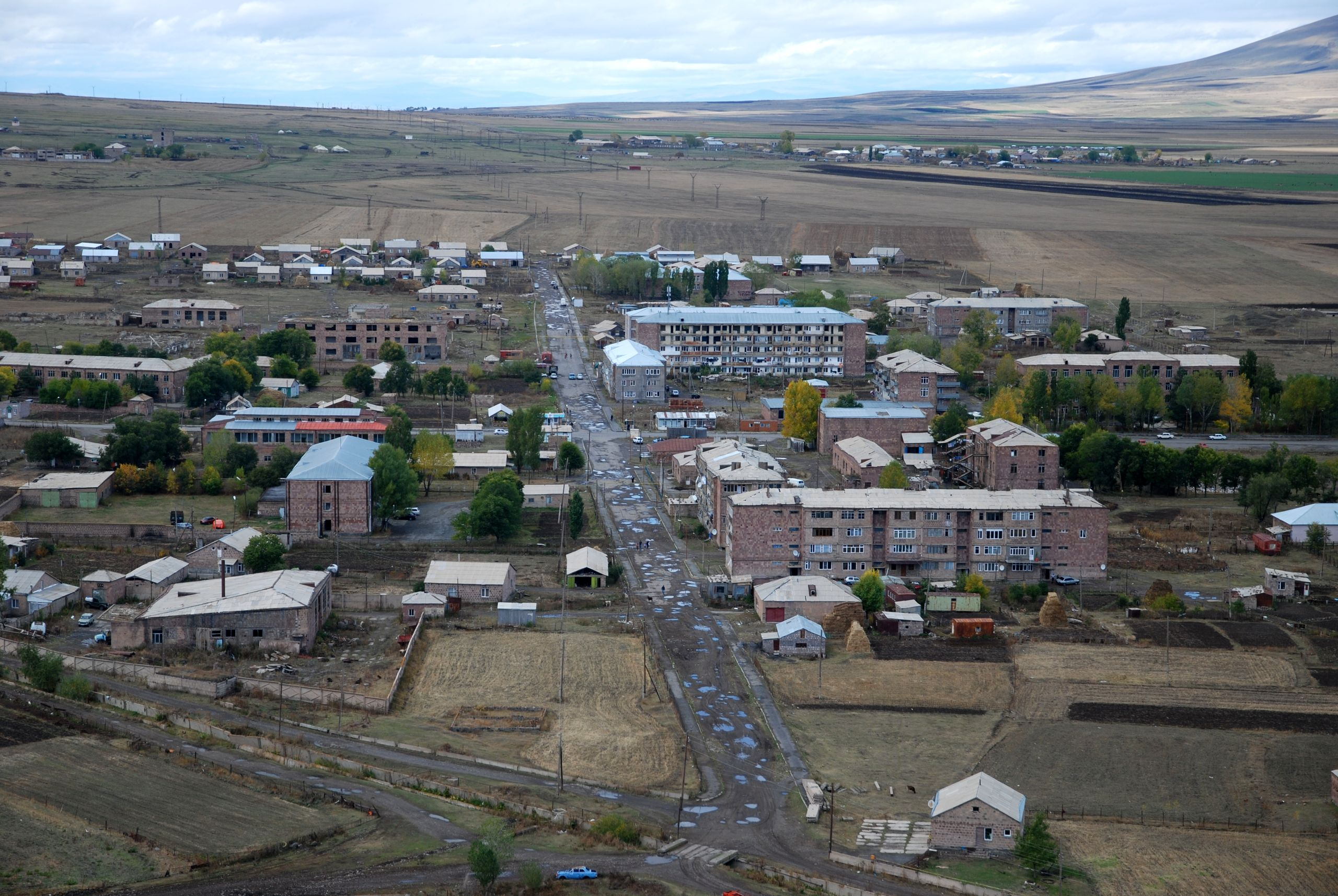

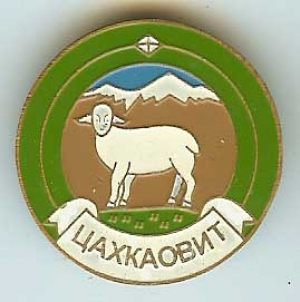
- Coat of arms

- Location within Armenia Location within Aragatsotn
- Coordinates: 40°38′10″N 44°13′23″E
- Country: Armenia
- Province: Aragatsotn
- Municipality: Tsaghkahovit
- Elevation: 2,011 m (6,598 ft)

Population (2011)
  - Total: 1,611
- Time zone: UTC+4
  - Summer (DST): UTC+5

Tsaghkahovit (Armenian: Ծաղկահովիտ), known as Haji Khalil until 1946, is a village in the Tsaghkahovit Municipality of the Aragatsotn Province of Armenia.

== Climate ==
Tsaghkahovit has a humid continental climate (Köppen Classification:Dfb)with mild summers and very cold winters.

Climate data for Tsaghkahovit (1991-2020)
Month	Jan	Feb	Mar	Apr	May	Jun	Jul	Aug	Sep	Oct	Nov	Dec	Year
Record high °C (°F)	6.5 (43.7)	9.0 (48.2)	17.5 (63.5)	23.2 (73.8)	24.9 (76.8)	28.2 (82.8)	32.7 (90.9)	33.0 (91.4)	31.2 (88.2)	24.1 (75.4)	16.0 (60.8)	14.6 (58.3)	33.0 (91.4)
Daily mean °C (°F)	−8.6 (16.5)	−7.6 (18.3)	−2.4 (27.7)	3.5 (38.3)	8.3 (46.9)	12.3 (54.1)	15.3 (59.5)	15.6 (60.1)	11.4 (52.5)	6.2 (43.2)	−0.8 (30.6)	−6.0 (21.2)	3.9 (39.1)
Record low °C (°F)	−27.8 (−18.0)	−31.0 (−23.8)	−25.2 (−13.4)	−20.2 (−4.4)	−6.0 (21.2)	−2.3 (27.9)	0.2 (32.4)	−1.0 (30.2)	−4.6 (23.7)	−10.6 (12.9)	−24.0 (−11.2)	−30.3 (−22.5)	−31.0 (−23.8)
Average precipitation mm (inches)	22.0 (0.87)	30.5 (1.20)	49.3 (1.94)	66.0 (2.60)	89.7 (3.53)	85.6 (3.37)	73.8 (2.91)	45.7 (1.80)	41.2 (1.62)	44.5 (1.75)	33.5 (1.32)	23.5 (0.93)	605.3 (23.84)
Average precipitation days (≥ 1 mm)	5.6	6	9	10.6	14.4	11.8	9.1	7	6	6.8	5.8	5.6	97.7
Average relative humidity (%)	79.5	77	74.5	72.4	73.9	74.6	75.6	72.7	71.4	73.1	76.3	79.4	75.0
