= Lchkadzor =

Village in Tavush, Armenia

Lchkadzor Լճկաձոր
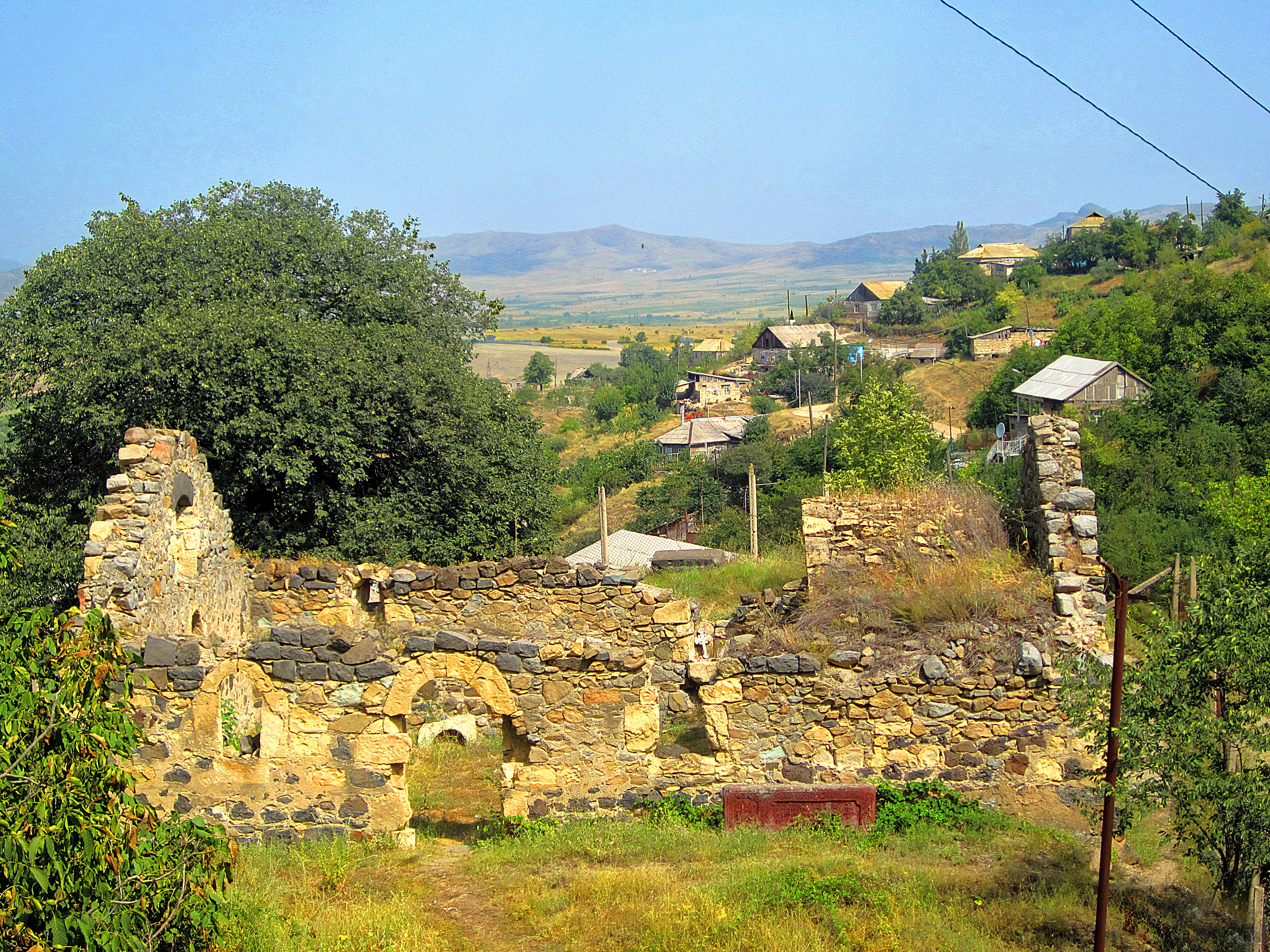

- Location within Armenia Location within Tavush
- Coordinates: 41°10′N 44°55′E
- Country: Armenia
- Province: Tavush
- Municipality: Noyemberyan

Population (2011)
  - Total: 433
- Time zone: UTC+4 (AMT)

Lchkadzor (Armenian: Լճկաձոր) is a village in the Noyemberyan Municipality of the Tavush Province of Armenia.

== Gallery ==
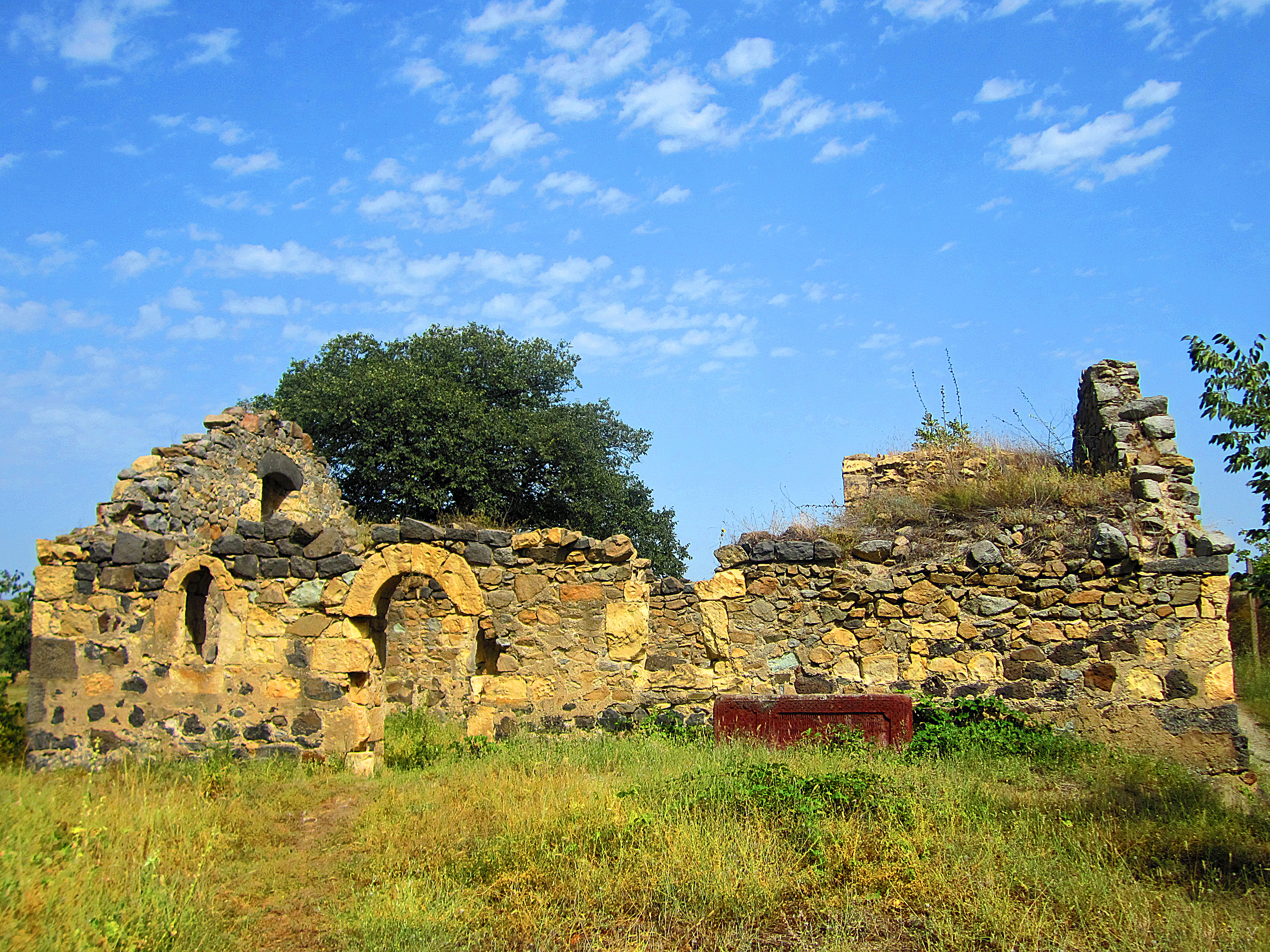
