= Bagratashen =

Village in Tavush, Armenia

Bagratashen Բագրատաշեն
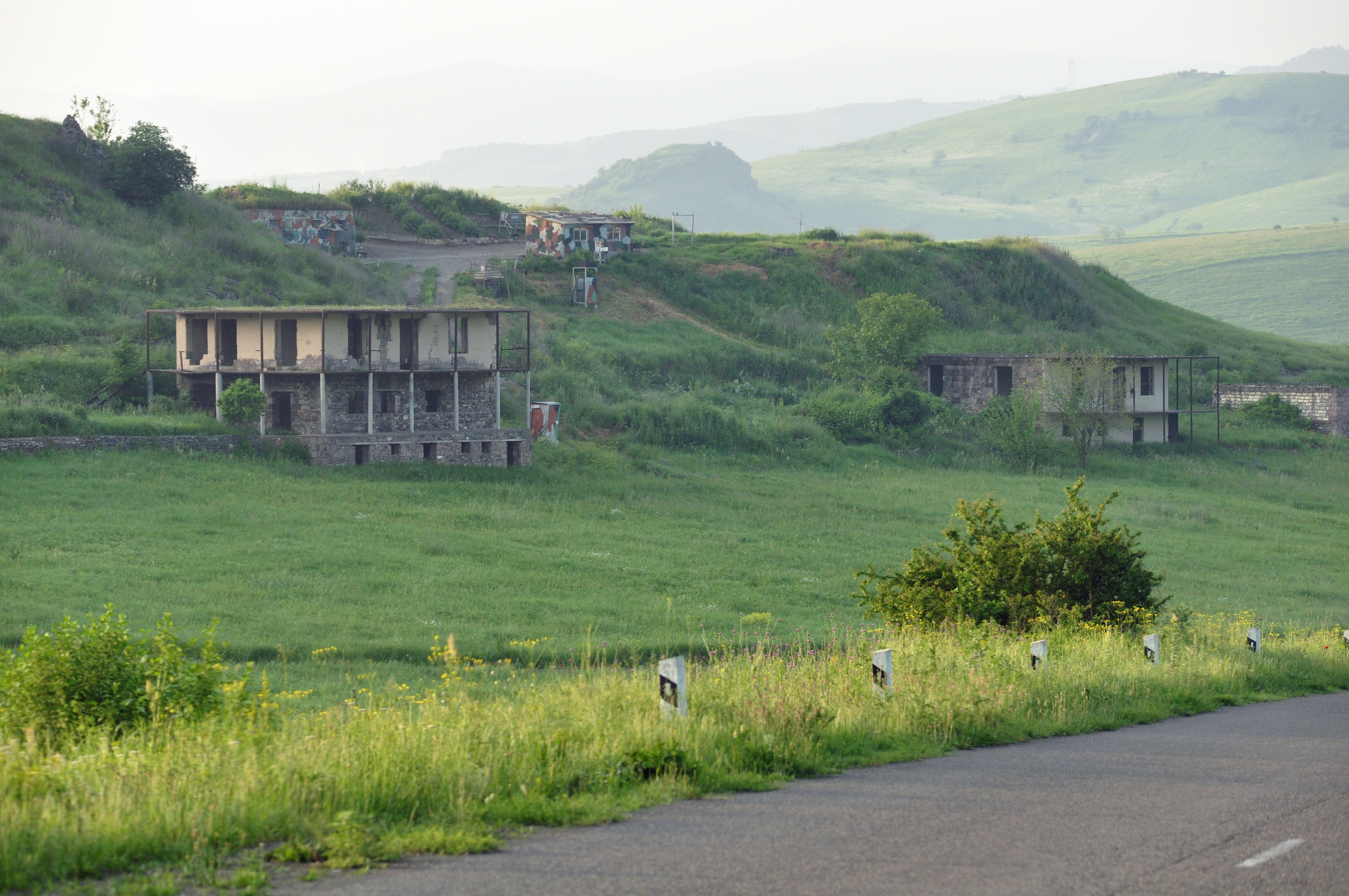

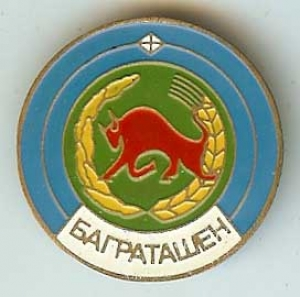
- Coat of arms

- Location within Armenia Location within Tavush
- Coordinates: 41°14′45″N 44°49′16″E
- Country: Armenia
- Province: Tavush
- Municipality: Noyemberyan

Population (2011)
  - Total: 2,732
- Time zone: UTC+4 (AMT)

Bagratashen (Armenian: Բագրատաշեն, Bagratašen; Georgian: ბაგრატაშენი, Bagrathasheni) is a village in the Noyemberyan Municipality of the Tavush Province of Armenia. The village is located near the border to Georgia, with the Georgian village of Sadakhlo being located on the other side of the border.

== Etymology ==
The village was named in honor of Bagrat Vardanian (1894-1971), who received the Hero of Socialist Labour title in the Soviet Union.

== Climate ==
Climate data for Bagratashen (1991-2020)
Month	Jan	Feb	Mar	Apr	May	Jun	Jul	Aug	Sep	Oct	Nov	Dec	Year
Record high °C (°F)	20.5 (68.9)	22.5 (72.5)	27.0 (80.6)	35.0 (95.0)	34.5 (94.1)	38.0 (100.4)	39.5 (103.1)	40.8 (105.4)	37.1 (98.8)	32.0 (89.6)	24.5 (76.1)	20.5 (68.9)	40.8 (105.4)
Daily mean °C (°F)	1.4 (34.5)	2.9 (37.2)	7.2 (45.0)	12 (54)	17.2 (63.0)	21.7 (71.1)	24.8 (76.6)	24.8 (76.6)	20.2 (68.4)	14.2 (57.6)	7.4 (45.3)	2.8 (37.0)	13.1 (55.5)
Record low °C (°F)	−16.6 (2.1)	−17.0 (1.4)	−11.4 (11.5)	−6.5 (20.3)	1.6 (34.9)	6.0 (42.8)	10.3 (50.5)	11.0 (51.8)	4.5 (40.1)	−1.5 (29.3)	−6.9 (19.6)	−14.0 (6.8)	−17.0 (1.4)
Average precipitation mm (inches)	18.3 (0.72)	20.3 (0.80)	39.4 (1.55)	56.5 (2.22)	74.2 (2.92)	54.3 (2.14)	33.9 (1.33)	18.6 (0.73)	31.7 (1.25)	41.7 (1.64)	30.8 (1.21)	18.4 (0.72)	438.1 (17.23)
Average precipitation days (≥ 1.0 mm)	3.6	4.1	5.9	8.2	10	7.4	4.8	3.1	4.4	5.9	4.7	3.5	65.6
Average relative humidity (%)	78.6	77.2	74.3	76	76	70.7	67.4	66.7	72.3	79.3	82.5	81	75.2
Source: NOAA
