= Haghtanak, Tavush =

Village in Tavush, Armenia

Haghtanak Հաղթանակ
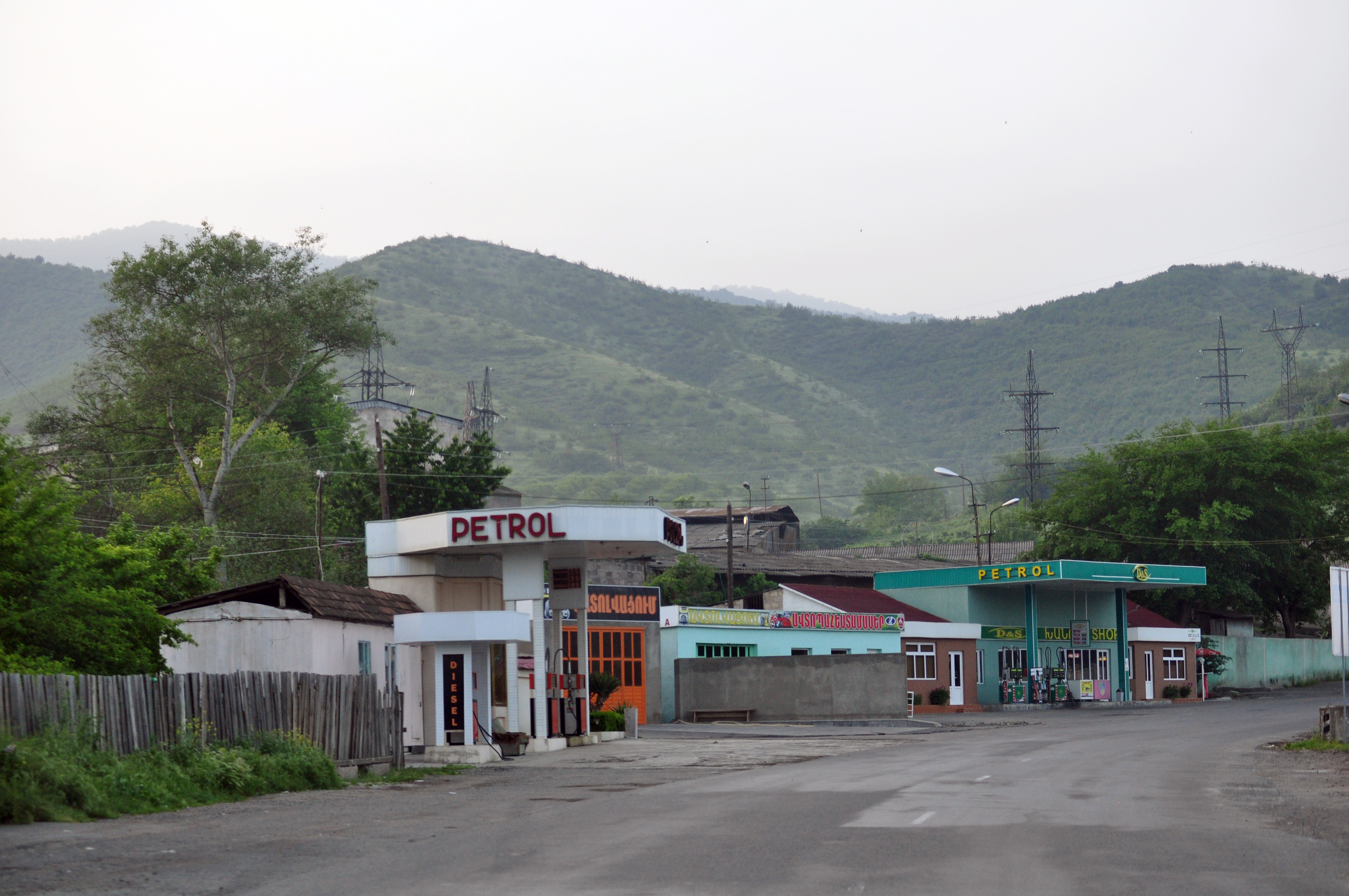

- Location within Armenia Location within Tavush
- Coordinates: 41°13′26″N 44°56′16″E
- Country: Armenia
- Province: Tavush
- Municipality: Noyemberyan

Population (2011)
  - Total: 1,161
- Time zone: UTC+4 (AMT)

Haghtanak (Armenian: Հաղթանակ) is a village in the Noyemberyan Municipality of the Tavush Province of Armenia, located near the Armenia–Georgia border.
