= Debedavan =

Debedavan Դեբեդավան Lalvar
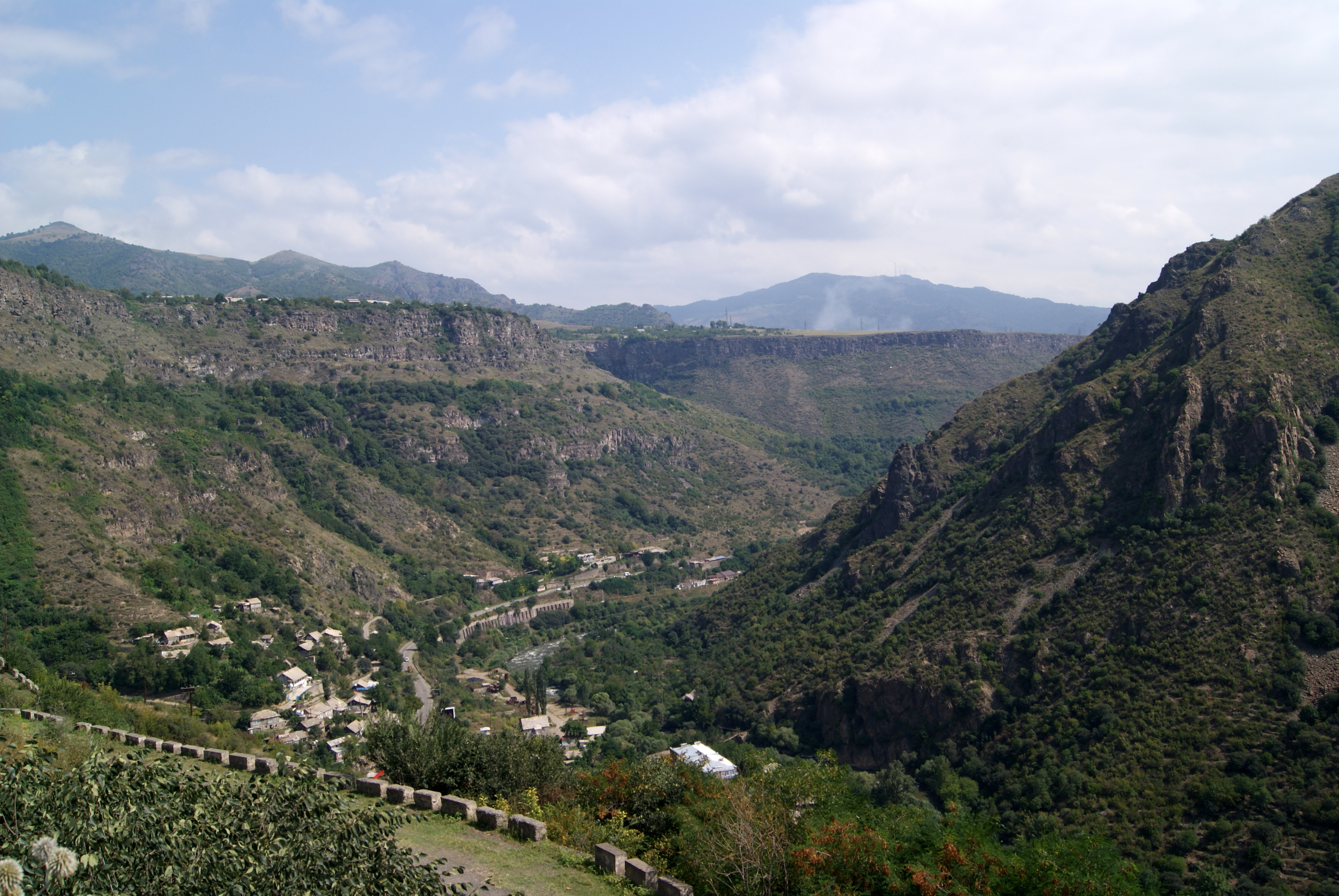
- A view of Debedavan

- Location within Armenia Location within Tavush
- Coordinates: 41.2794883°N 44.8122321°E
- Country: Armenia
- Province: Tavush
- Municipality: Noyemberyan

Population (2011)
  - Total: 669
- Time zone: UTC+4 (AMT)

Debedavan (Armenian: Դեբեդավան), officially known until 1978 as Lalvar (Azerbaijani: Ləlvar) is a village in the Noyemberyan Municipality of the Tavush Province of Armenia, located near the Armenia–Georgia border. The village was populated by Azerbaijanis until 1988, when tensions between Armenians and Azerbaijanis escalated. The village was also previously a winemaking center.

Debedavan is known as the lowest point (ca. 370 m. above the sea level) in Armenia.

== Demographics ==
Year	1989	2001	2011
Population	185	763	669
