= Ptghavan =

Village in Tavush, Armenia

Ptghavan Պտղավան
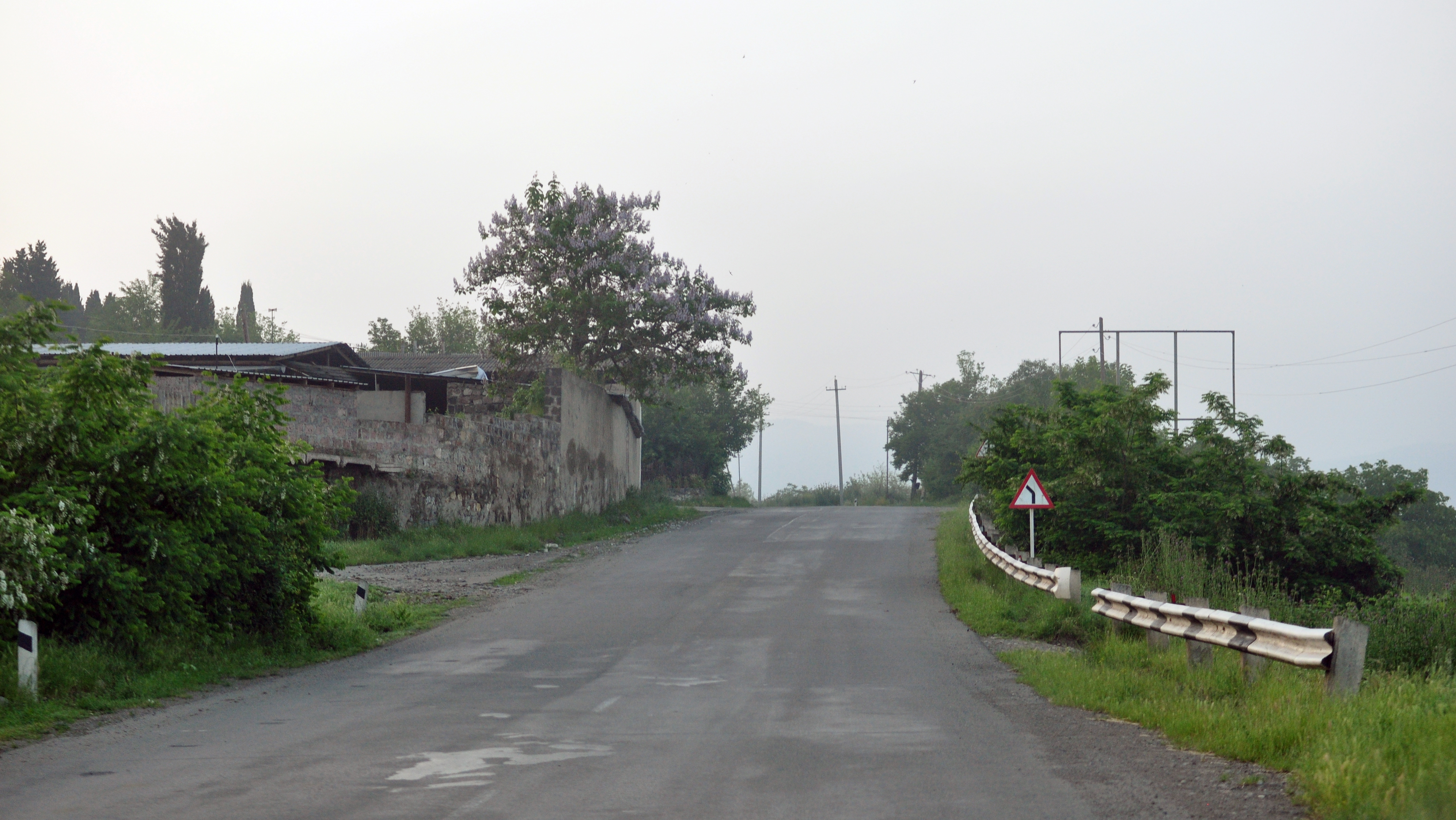

- Location within Armenia Location within Tavush
- Coordinates: 41°13′N 44°55′E
- Country: Armenia
- Province: Tavush
- Municipality: Noyemberyan

Population (2011)
  - Total: 831
- Time zone: UTC+4 (AMT)

Ptghavan (Armenian: Պտղավան) is a village in the Noyemberyan Municipality of the Tavush Province of Armenia, near the Armenia–Georgia border.
