= Archis, Armenia =

Archis Արճիս
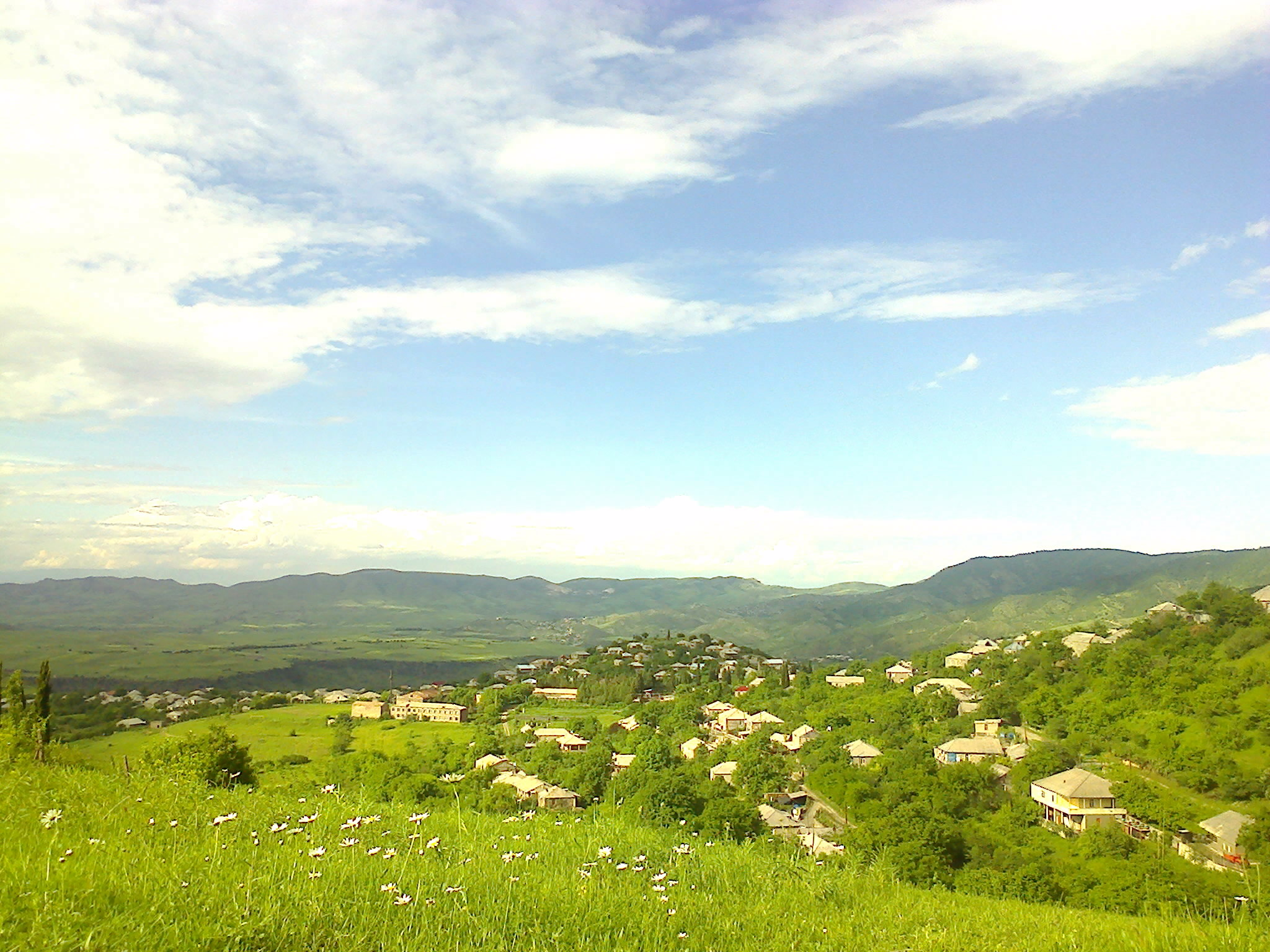

- Location within Armenia Location within Tavush
- Coordinates: 41°09′51″N 44°52′21″E
- Country: Armenia
- Province: Tavush
- Municipality: Noyemberyan
- Elevation: 750 m (2,460 ft)

Population (2011)
  - Total: 1,125
- Time zone: UTC+4 (AMT)

Archis (Armenian: Արճիս) is a village in the Noyemberyan Municipality of the Tavush Province of Armenia.

== Gallery ==
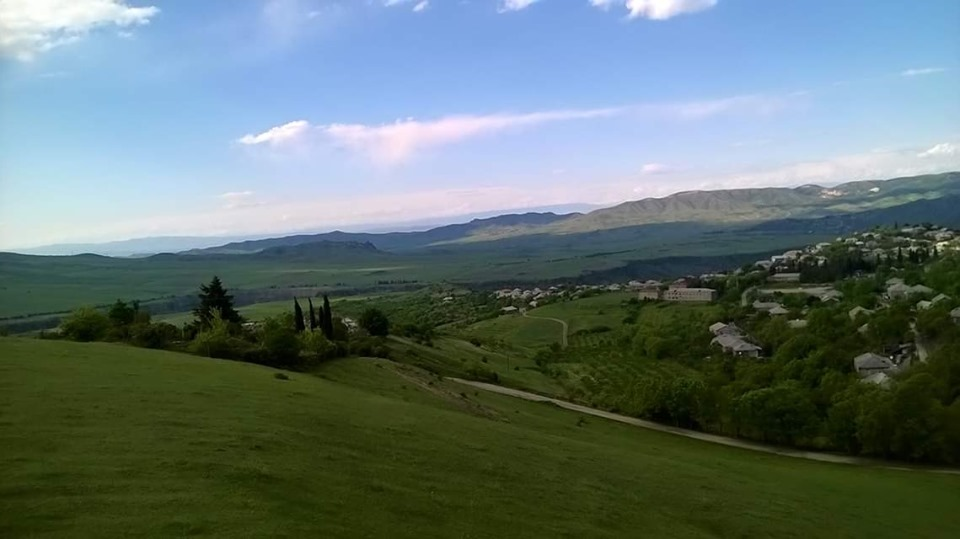
Scenery around Archis
