= Privolnoye, Armenia =

Privolnoye Պրիվոլնոյե
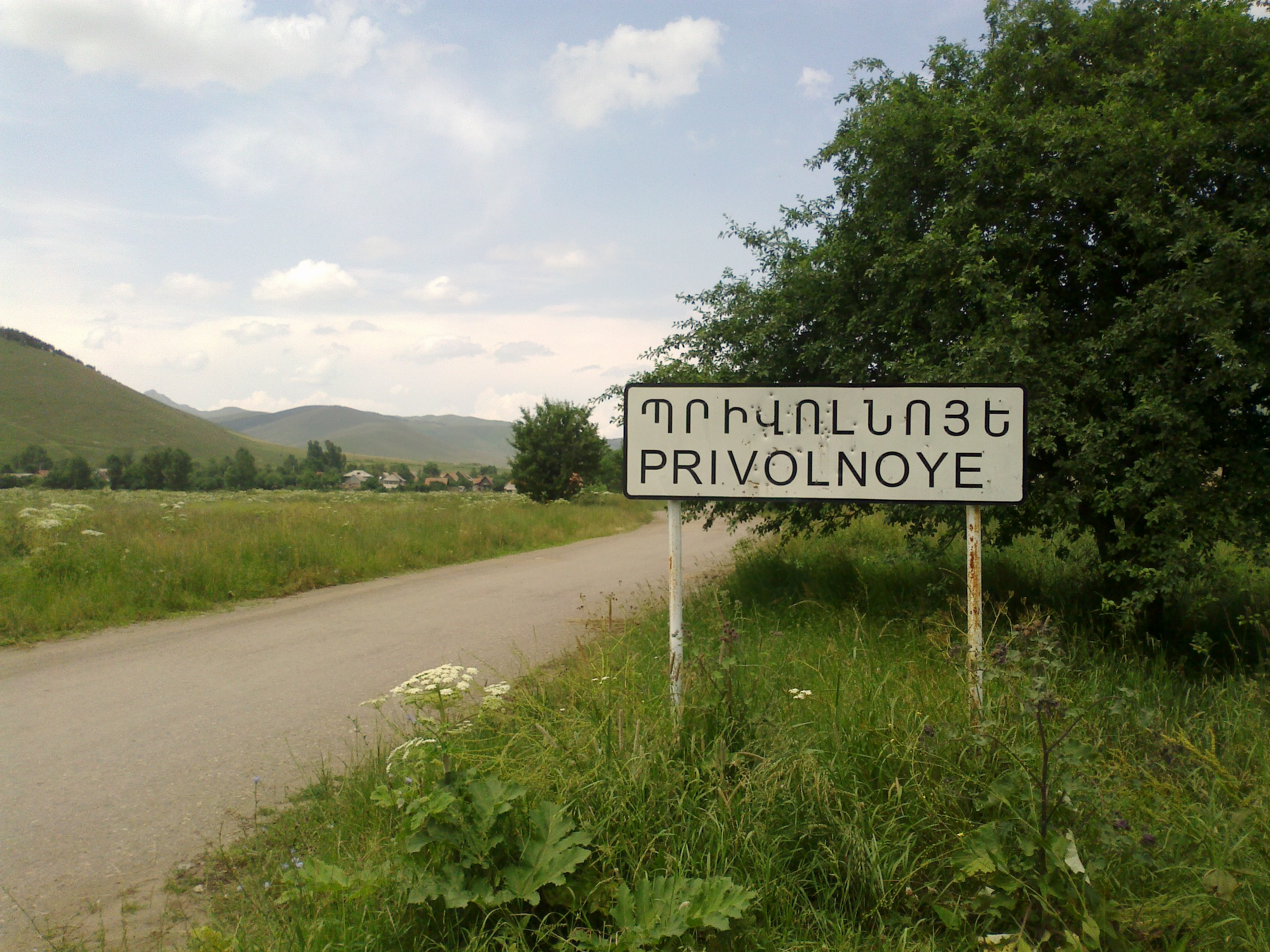
- Entrance to the village

- Location within Armenia
- Coordinates: 41°08′46″N 44°26′33″E
- Country: Armenia
- Marz (Province): Lori

Area
  - Total: 5,511 km^{2} (2,128 sq mi)

Population (2011)
  - Total: 805
- Time zone: UTC+4 ( )

Privolnoye (Armenian: Պրիվոլնոյե), is a village in the Lori Province of Armenia.

Village is situated by the border with Georgia, 17 km on south-east from the center of region – Tashir.

Privolnoye was founded in 1850. First residents were Russians who moved from Czarist Russia and inhabited different parts of the village.

It is located 1585 m above the sea level. Winters are severely cold and summers cool. In dry years drought are very frequent.

4621.8 hectares of an overall land are agricultural lands, of which 1071.6 ha of arable land, 1480.11 hectares are hayfields and 1945.7 hectares are pastures. The residents are mostly engaged in animal husbandry and growing grains, potato, melons, pumpkin, cabbage and other vegetables.

The village has a secondary school, a cultural center, a medical center and a post office.

Privolnoye hosts a church from 1895 built by Russian inhabitants.

== Khuchap Monastery ==
The Khuchap Monastery is located here.
