= Marz (country subdivision) =

Marz (մարզ), plural marzer (մարզեր), is the name for a first-level administrative entity in Armenia. In English, it is usually translated as province or region.

== Etymology ==
This Armenian word is derived from the Persian word marz (مرز), meaning "border," cognate with English march.

== See also ==
- Administrative divisions of Armenia
- Administrative divisions of the Republic of Artsakh
- March (territory)
