= Administrative divisions of Armenia =

Provinces of Armenia
- Subdivisions of Armenia: 1. Aragatsotn; 2. Ararat; 3. Armavir; 4. Gegharkunik; 5. Kotayk; 6. Lori; 7. Shirak; 8. Syunik; 9. Tavush; 10. Vayots Dzor; 11. Yerevan
- Category: Unitary state
- Location: Armenia
- Number: 10 Provinces; 1 Special status city
- Populations: (Provinces only): 52,324 (Vayots Dzor) – 265,770 (Armavir)
- Areas: (Provinces only): 1,200 km^{2} (480 sq mi) (Armavir) – 5,350 km^{2} (2,065 sq mi) (Gegharkunik)
- Government: Provincial government, National government
- Subdivisions: Hamaynkner

Armenia is subdivided into eleven administrative divisions. Of these, ten are provinces, known as marzer (մարզեր) or in the singular form marz (մարզ) in Armenian.

Yerevan is treated separately and granted special administrative status as the country's capital. The chief executive in each of 10 marzes is the marzpet, appointed by the government of Armenia. In Yerevan, the chief executive is the mayor, elected by the Yerevan City Council.

== First-level administrative divisions ==
The following is a list of the provinces with population, area, and density information. Figures are from the Statistical Committee of Armenia. The area of the Gegharkunik Province includes Lake Sevan which covers 1,278 square kilometres (493 sq mi) of its territory:

Province	Population (2011 census)	Population (2022 census)	%	Area (km^{2})	Density	Urban communities	Rural communities	Capital
Aragatsotn	132,925	128,941	4.4%	2,773	46.5/km^{2} (120/sq mi)	3	69	Ashtarak
Ararat	260,367	248,982	8.5%	2,090	119.1/km^{2} (308/sq mi)	4	91	Artashat
Armavir	265,770	253,493	8.6%	1,231	205.9/km^{2} (533/sq mi)	3	94	Armavir
Gegharkunik	235,075	209,669	7.1%	5,351	39.2/km^{2} (102/sq mi)	5	52	Gavar
Kotayk	254,397	269,883	9.2%	2,076	130/km^{2} (340/sq mi)	7	35	Hrazdan
Lori	235,537	222,805	7.6%	3,799	58.6/km^{2} (152/sq mi)	7	50	Vanadzor
Shirak	251,941	235,484	8%	2,680	87.9/km^{2} (228/sq mi)	3	39	Gyumri
Syunik	141,771	114,488	3.9%	4,506	25.4/km^{2} (66/sq mi)	5	3	Kapan
Tavush	128,609	114,940	3.9%	2,704	42.5/km^{2} (110/sq mi)	5	19	Ijevan
Vayots Dzor	52,324	47,369	1.6%	2,310	20.5/km^{2} (53/sq mi)	3	5	Yeghegnadzor
Yerevan	1,060,138	1,086,677	37.1%	223	4,873/km^{2} (12,620/sq mi)	1	n/a	n/a

== Municipalities (hamaynkner) ==
Within each province of the republic, there are municipal communities (hamaynkner, singular hamaynk), currently considered the second-level administrative division in Armenia. Each municipality – known officially as community, either rural or urban- is a self-governing entity and consists of one or more settlements (bnakavayrer, singular bnakavayr). The settlements are classified as either towns (kaghakner, singular kaghak) or villages (gyugher, singular gyugh). As of January 2018, Armenia is divided into 503 communities, of which 46 are urban and 457 are rural. The capital, Yerevan, also holds the status of a community. Additionally, Yerevan is divided into twelve semi-autonomous districts.

== Yerevan ==
Administrative districts of Yerevan

The capital of Armenia is Yerevan. The city of Yerevan is the largest administrative-territorial unit of Armenia by population. Local self-government is carried out in the capital Yerevan, whose bodies are the Council of Elders of Yerevan and the mayor.

According to the 1995 Constitution of Armenia, the Mayor of Yerevan was appointed by presidential decree upon the recommendation of the prime minister. However, according to the constitutional amendments of 2005, the specifics of local self-government in the city of Yerevan are defined by the Law "On Local Self-Government in the City of Yerevan." According to the current Constitution of Armenia (with amendments of December 6, 2015): "Yerevan is a community. The specifics of local self-government in Yerevan are defined by law."

The Yerevan City Council consists of 65 members and is elected by the residents of Yerevan through a proportional electoral system. The first candidate on the electoral list of the party that receives 40 percent or more of the council seats is considered elected as mayor of Yerevan. If no such party exists, the mayor is elected by the council.

Yerevan is divided into 12 administrative districts. These are Ajapnyak, Avan, Arabkir, Davtashen, Erebuni, Kentron, Malatia-Sebastia, Nor Nork, Nork-Marash, Nubarashen, Shengavit, and Kanaker-Zeytun.

Capital city of Yerevan	Population (2025)	Share of RA population (%)	Area (km^{2})	Population density (people/km^{2})	Urban communities	Rural communities
Yerevan	1,143.3	37.07%	223	5126.91	1	n/a

== Terminology ==
Armenian singular	Armenian plural	English	Comment
marz (մարզ)	marzer (մարզեր)	province	First-level
hamaynk (համայնք)	hamaynkner (համայնքներ)	municipality, either urban (city/town) or rural (village)	Second-level
bnakavayr (բնակավայր)	bnakavayrer (բնակավայրեր)	settlement (village)	Third-level
t'aghayin hamaynk (թաղային համայնք)	t'aghayin hamaynkner (թաղային համայնքներ)	neighborhood community or district	only in Yerevan, see Districts of Yerevan

== See also ==
- Districts of the Armenian Soviet Socialist Republic
- Administrative divisions of the Republic of Artsakh
- ISO 3166-2:AM
- List of Armenian provinces by Human Development Index
