= Meore-Kesalo =

Coordinates: 41°23′04″N 45°02′04″E

Meore-Kesalo მეორე ქესალო İkinci Kosalı
- Village
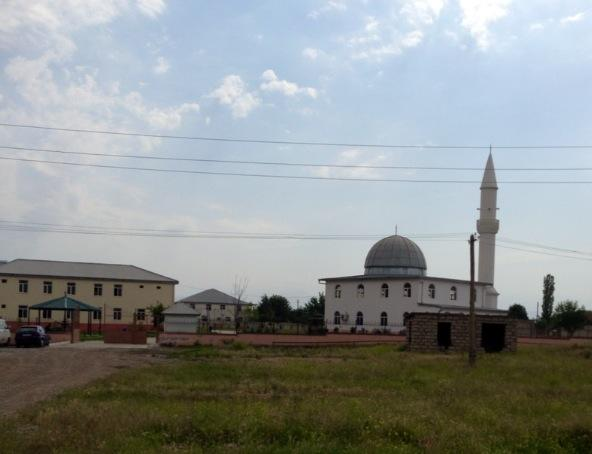
- Mosque in Meore-Kesalo

- Location within Georgia Location within Kvemo Kartli
- Country: Georgia
- Mkhare: Kvemo Kartli
- Municipality: Marneuli

Area
  - Total: 2.31 km^{2} (0.89 sq mi)
- Elevation: 309 m (1,014 ft)

Population (2014)
  - Total: 1,353
- Time zone: UTC+4 (GET)

Meore-Kesalo (Georgian: მეორე ქესალო) or Ikinji Kosali (Azerbaijani: İkinci Kosalı) is a village in the Marneuli Municipality of Kvemo Kartli, Georgia. Located at the Khrami river, 25 kilometers away from Marneuli, it's a majority-Azerbaijani populated and Sunni Muslim village.

There is a mosque in the village and the second ever religious educational institution in Georgia.

== Demographics ==
According to the 2014 census, 1,353 people live in the village, with most of them being Sunni Azerbaijanis.

Year	Population	Male	Female
2002	1587	795	792
2014	▼1353	679	674

== See also ==
- Azerbaijanis in Georgia
- Imiri
- Didi Mughanlo
