= Isakhan Ashurov =

Azerbaijani human rights lawyer

- İsaxan Aşurov
- Isakhan Ashurov in January 2009
- Born: August 1, 1955; Bolnisi Municipality, Georgian SSR
- Died: June 22, 2012 (aged 56); United States
- Citizenship: Azerbaijan
- Education: Baku State University
- Occupations: lawyer, human rights defender
- Years active: 1996–2012

Isakhan Gara oglu Ashurov (Azerbaijani: İsaxan Qara oğlu Aşurov; August 1, 1955, Bolnisi Municipality, Georgian SSR — June 22, 2012, United States) was an Azerbaijani lawyer. From 1996 onward, he practiced law and defended the rights of many political prisoners and “prisoners of conscience”.

== Biography ==
Isakhan Gara oglu Ashurov was born on August 1, 1955, in the village of Talaveri in the Bolnisi district of Georgia.

In 1972, he graduated from secondary school in Talaveri and the same year entered the law faculty of Azerbaijan State University named after S. Kirov, graduating in 1977.

From 1977 to 1981, he worked as an investigator in the Qazax police department; from 1981 to 1984, as an investigator in the Tovuz district police department; and from 1984 to 1989, as an investigator in the investigative brigade of the Main Investigation Group of the USSR Ministry of Internal Affairs.

From 1989 to 1991, he served as head of the investigative department of the Tovuz district police department; from 1991 to 1992, as chief investigator of the Goychay district police department; and from 1992 to 1993, as head of the Qazax district police department.

Since 1996, he worked as a lawyer and was a member of the Azerbaijan Bar Association.

Ashurov defended the rights of opposition activists arrested during the events of October 15–16 following the 2003 presidential elections, as well as a number of political prisoners, including journalist Eynulla Fatullayev (arrested in 2007), writer Rafiq Tağı (arrested in 2007), blogger Adnan Hajizade (arrested in 2010), and former minister of economic development Farhad Aliyev (arrested in 2005).

He was a member of the Mejlis of the Musavat Party and headed its Law and Justice Committee. He was also the chairman of the League of Independent Lawyers. On October 7, 2003, on the eve of the presidential elections, while traveling to Masallı for a meeting between Isa Gambar (leader of the Musavat Party) and voters, he was forcibly pulled out of his car by police near Biləsuvar and severely beaten.

He died in the United States on June 22, 2012, after a prolonged illness. He was buried on June 28 in his native village of Talaveri.

He was married and had four children.

== Memory ==
On June 23, 2012, the Institute for Peace and Democracy (IPD) established the “Isakhan Ashurov Prize,” awarded to fighters for human rights and democracy. In 2013, the prize was awarded to Hilal Mammadov, the imprisoned editor-in-chief of the newspaper Tolishi Sado (“Talysh Voice”), and in 2014 to Yadigar Sadigov, the imprisoned adviser to the chairman of the Musavat Party.
