= Didi Mughanlo =

Didi Mughanlo დიდი მუღანლო Böyük Muğanlı
- Village
- Location within Georgia Location within Kvemo Kartli
- Country: Georgia
- Mkhare: Kvemo Kartli
- Municipality: Marneuli

Area
  - Total: 1.65 km^{2} (0.64 sq mi)
- Elevation: 310 m (1,020 ft)

Population (2014)
  - Total: 1,286
- Time zone: UTC+4 (GET)

Didi Mughanlo (Georgian: დიდი მუღანლო) or Boyuk Mughanli (Azerbaijani: Böyük Muğanlı, lit. 'Great Mughanli') is a village in the Marneuli Municipality of Kvemo Kartli, Georgia. Located at the Khrami river, 18 kilometers away from Marneuli, it's a majority-Azerbaijani populated village.

== Demographics ==
According to the 2014 census, 1,286 people live in the village, with all of them being Azerbaijanis.

Year	Population	Male	Female
2002	1815	887	928
2014	▼1286	646	640

== History ==
In 1850, during the journey of the Viceroy of the Caucasus Vorontsov to the Borchaly uezd, his guide and historian, Luka Israilov (Isarishvili) wrote about the local villages, among which he also mentioned Didi Mughanlo, saying that it was among the villages settled by Turkic tribes.

According to a census from 1869, there were 35 Azerbaijani (Tatar) families residing in the village.

== See also ==
- Azerbaijanis in Georgia
- Imiri
- Kizilajlo
