= Imiri =

Imiri იმირი İmir
- Village
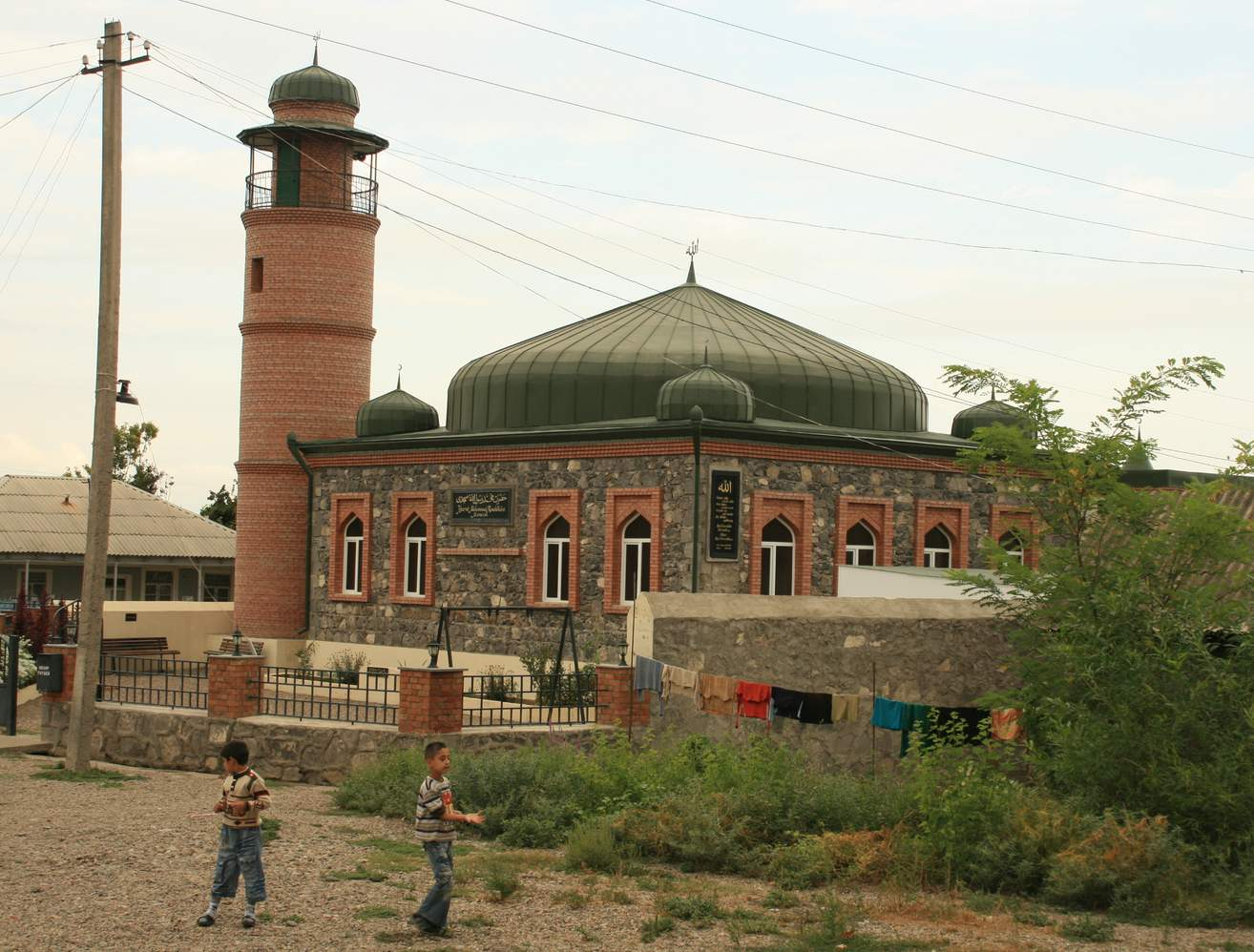
- Mosque in Imiri

- Location within Georgia Location within Kvemo Kartli
- Country: Georgia
- Mkhare: Kvemo Kartli
- Municipality: Marneuli

Area
  - Total: 1.2 km^{2} (0.46 sq mi)
- Elevation: 350 m (1,150 ft)

Population (2014)
  - Total: 1,235
- Time zone: UTC+4 (GET)

Imiri (Georgian: იმირი) or Imir (Azerbaijani: İmir) is a village in the Marneuli Municipality of Kvemo Kartli, Georgia. Located at the Khrami river, 10 kilometers away from Marneuli, it's a majority-Azerbaijani populated village.

An ancient hillfort was discovered southwest of the village.

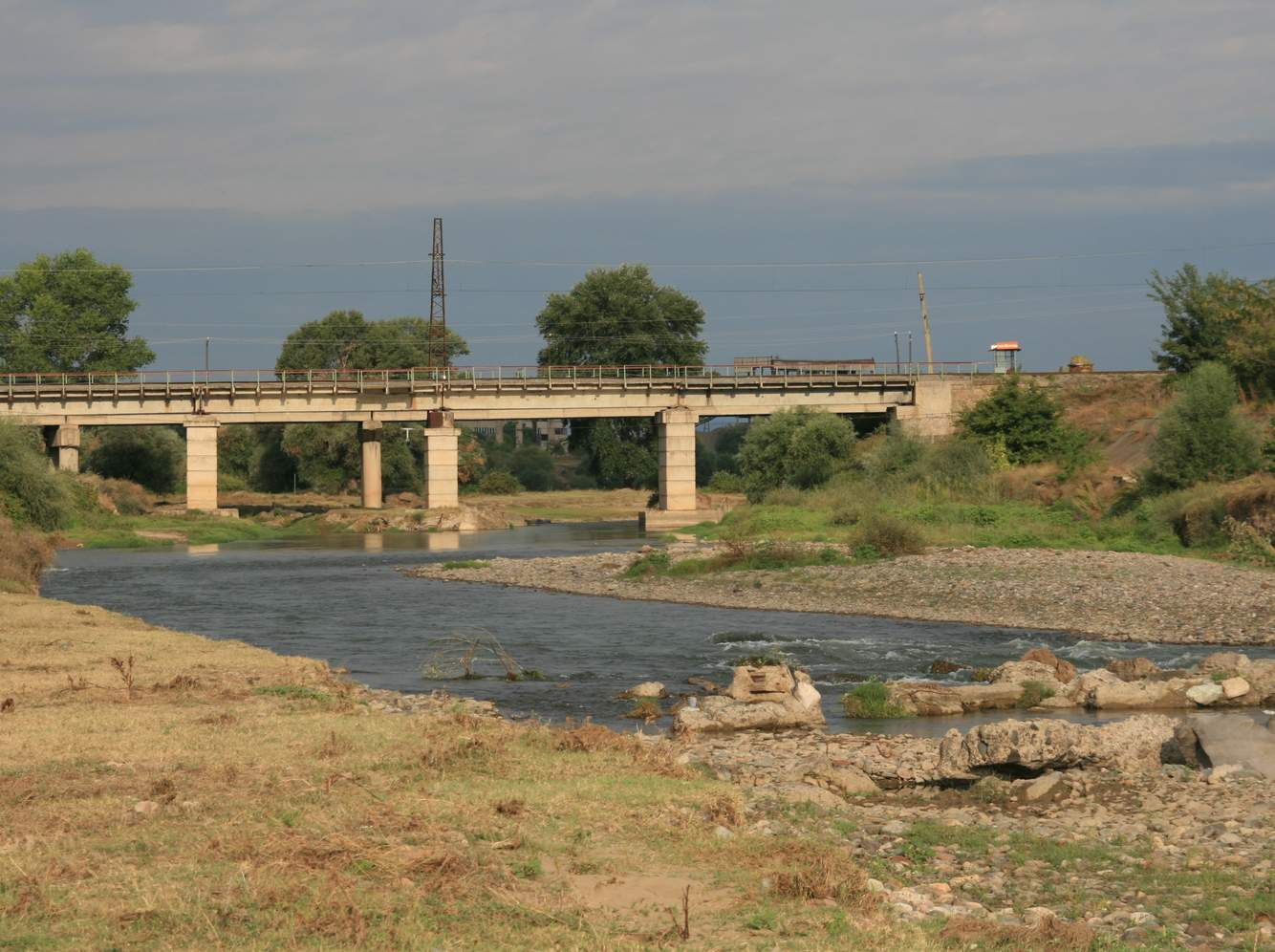

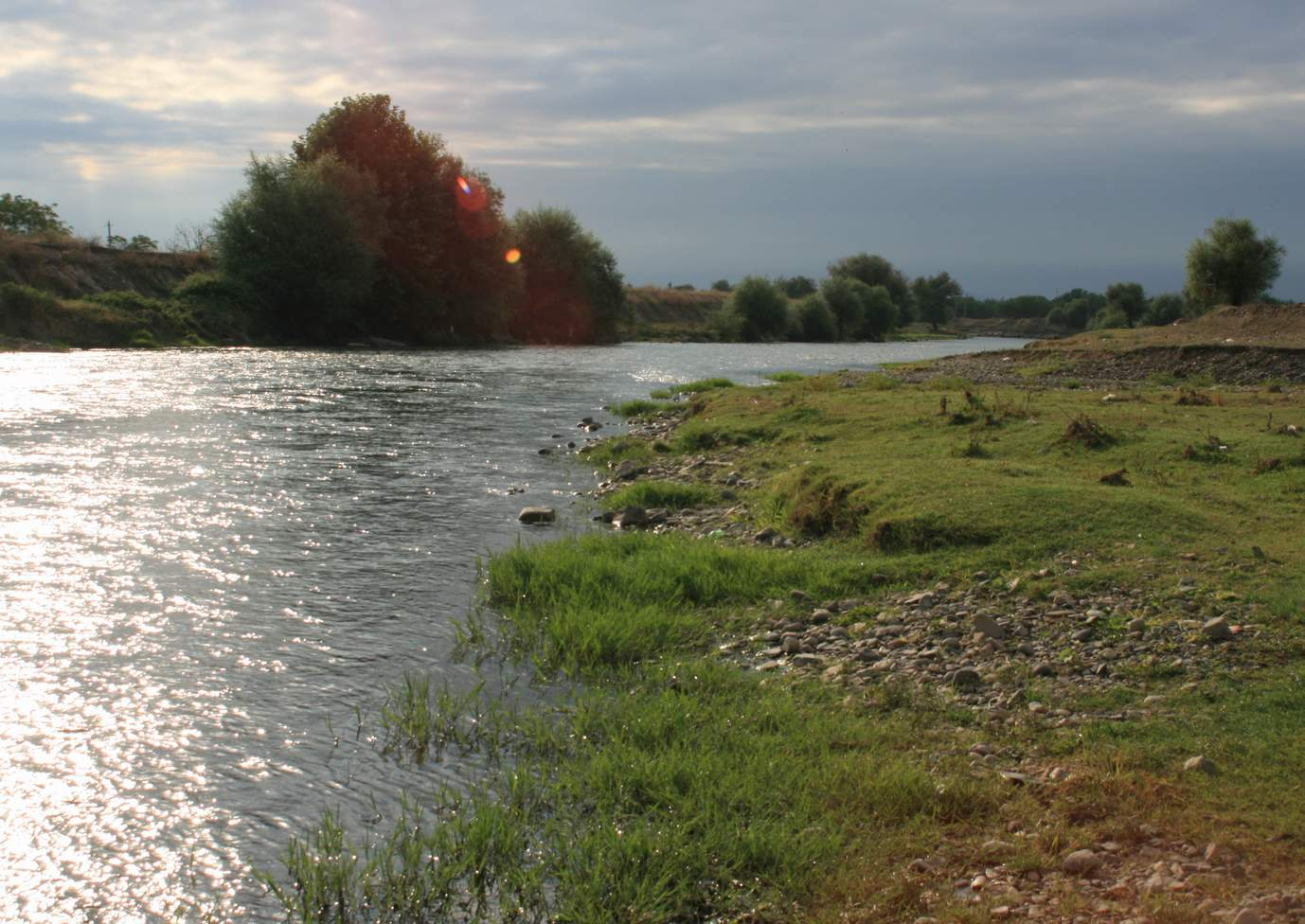
The Khrami river at Imiri

== Demographics ==
According to the 2014 census, 1,235 people live in the village, with most of them being Azerbaijanis.

Year	Population	Male	Female
2002	1445	708	737
2014	▼1235	623	603

== History ==
The earliest form of settlement near the village dates to Gadachrili Gora (Georgian: გადაჭრილი გორა; Azerbaijani: Kəsik Təpə) from the 6th millennium BC, a 5 m high hillfort 90 m in diameter, which was excavated in 1971. While the original settlement belongs to the Neolithic Shulaveri–Shomu culture, it was later repurposed as a burial ground, with tombs belonging to the Kura–Araxes culture dating back to the Early Bronze Age. Georgian authorities have protected the site since 2016. As of 2026, a museum dedicated to the site is being built.

In 2011, SOCAR, in cooperation with the government of Mikheil Saakashvili, expanded its gas networks into Imiri.

== See also ==
- Azerbaijanis in Georgia
- Kizilajlo
- Didi Mughanlo
