= Qızılhacılı =

Qızılhacılı or Kyzylgadzhily or Kyzylgadzhyly may refer to:

- Qızılhacılı, Goranboy, Azerbaijan
- Qızılhacılı, Qazakh, Azerbaijan
- Kizilajlo, Georgia
