= Isaxan Rebellion =

Peasant uprising

- Part of Dekulakization in the Soviet Union
Date	1929–1930
Location	Borchali, Georgian Soviet Socialist Republic, Transcaucasian SFSR
Result	Rebellion suppressed by Soviet authorities: Initial success for the rebels; Peace agreement signed but later violated by the Soviets; Death of Isaxan in late summer 1930

Belligerents
Karapapakhs (Azerbaijan Democratic Republic) Azerbaijanis	Soviet Union (Georgian Soviet Socialist Republic) Georgian SSR; OGPU

Commanders and leaders
Isaxan Hacibayramli †; Qurban Hacibayramli; Nağı Hacibayramli; Ali Haqqalanli; Sadix Sadixoghlu	(Georgian Soviet Socialist Republic) Lavrentiy Beriya; Unknown Soviet OGPU and Red Army officers

Strength
Unknown	Unknown

Casualties and losses
~30	~250

The Isaxan Rebellion was a peasant uprising that emerged as a response to the rapid collectivization and confiscation of peasant property by the Soviet regime in the late 1920s. Originating mainly in the Borchali, Qazax, and Lori regions of Transcaucasia, it defended the inviolability of rural life and the preservation of national traditions against Soviet repression. The rebellion also became a part of local oral culture through epic poems such as the Qaçaq Isaxan Dastanı.

== Background ==
At the beginning of the 20th century, during the period of Sovietization and collectivization in the Transcaucasian region (including eastern and southeastern Georgia, northern Armenia, and western Azerbaijan), widespread social and political unrest took place. Following the collapse of the Russian Empire, the region became a complex web of conflicting powers and ideologies. The most critical factor behind the rebellion was the Soviet policy of “Collectivization” that intensified in the late 1920s. Peasants were deprived of their lands, livestock, and grain. The campaign to “eliminate the Kulaks” provoked anger among the settled and semi-nomadic Karapapak Turks. Arbitrary arrests, forced confiscations, and excessive taxation created the groundwork for revolt. In this atmosphere of oppression, İsaxan Hacibayramli (born 1897 in Qaraxaç Plateau), known as Qaçaq Isaxan (“Outlaw Isaxan”), emerged as a folk leader defending the rights of the people. His movement transformed passive resistance into an organized armed struggle against Soviet injustice.

== The Rebellion ==
The Isaxan Rebellion, taking place between 1929 and 1930, became one of the most notable anti-Soviet uprisings in Georgia's Borchali region and surrounding areas. Presidential Archives of the Republic of Georgia (formerly: Party Archive of the Georgian Branch of the Institute of Marxism–Leninism affiliated with the Central Committee of the Communist Party of the Soviet Union) documents related to urgent and secret correspondence and agreements between Tbilisi and Moscow between March 12 and 16, 1930, reveal the scope of the Isaxan Uprising (the documents are presented in Russian, as they were originally written):

"В Грузии подготовляется операция против старой банды Исахана (Караязы), взявшего вчера обратно свое желание примириться, что объясняется повидимому организованным воздействием муссаватистов".

"Санкционировать операции Закавказского ГПУ по ликвидации банды в Караязском району... Разработать проект практических мероприятий – участие КК Армии в борьбе с бандитизмом, в частности обсудить вопрос о передислокации частей КК Армии... Отпустить Зак.ГПУ из резервного фонда ЗСНК 200000 рублей сверх ранее отпущенных".

"С первых же дней коллективизация встретила резкое сопротивление не только со стороны кулачества, но и середняков... Наличие отдельных бандитских групп в Караязском районе, также в районах бывшего Борчалинского уезда под руководством бывшего примиренного бандита Исахана".

Within weeks, insurgents took control of villages around Sarvan, Koraxı, and Qızılhacılı in Borchali, and parts of Qarayazı. Reports of Soviet casualties alarmed both Tbilisi and Moscow. In response, Soviet authorities launched large-scale operations with reinforcements from the Caucasus Army and OGPU units. There were even discussions among high-ranking officials about negotiating peace with the rebel leader to prevent further escalation. Isaxan and his followers used the harsh terrain — Madash, Saz Mountain, Ceyranchol, Goy Tomtu, and Keshish Mountain — to wage a successful guerrilla campaign against Soviet forces.

== Aftermath ==
The scale of the uprising and the Red Army's losses forced Soviet authorities to seek a peace. A five-point peace agreement was reached that persuaded Isaxan to cease hostilities. However, the Soviets soon violated the agreement. Within two months, they launched a surprise operation against Isaxan's group while they were unprepared. During the renewed clashes in the summer of 1930, Isaxan regarded as a hero among the Karapapak Turks was killed in battle at the age of 33. Gurban Hacibayramli and his brother Nağı Hacibayramli went to Turkey along with some participants of the uprising and lived there under the surname Bayramgil. Most of the insurgents were eliminated by the Soviet government. His death marked the end of organized resistance but left a deep impression on local memory as a symbol of courage and Soviet betrayal.

== Legacy ==
The Isaxan Rebellion has remained a notable symbol of anti-Soviet resistance in the South Caucasus. It reflected the determination of local Turkic and Georgian villagers to defend their traditional way of life against forced collectivization. Its memory survives in folk poetry and oral narratives across the Borchali and Qazax regions.
