= Dzveli Kveshi =

Dzveli Kveshi ძველი ქვეში
- Village
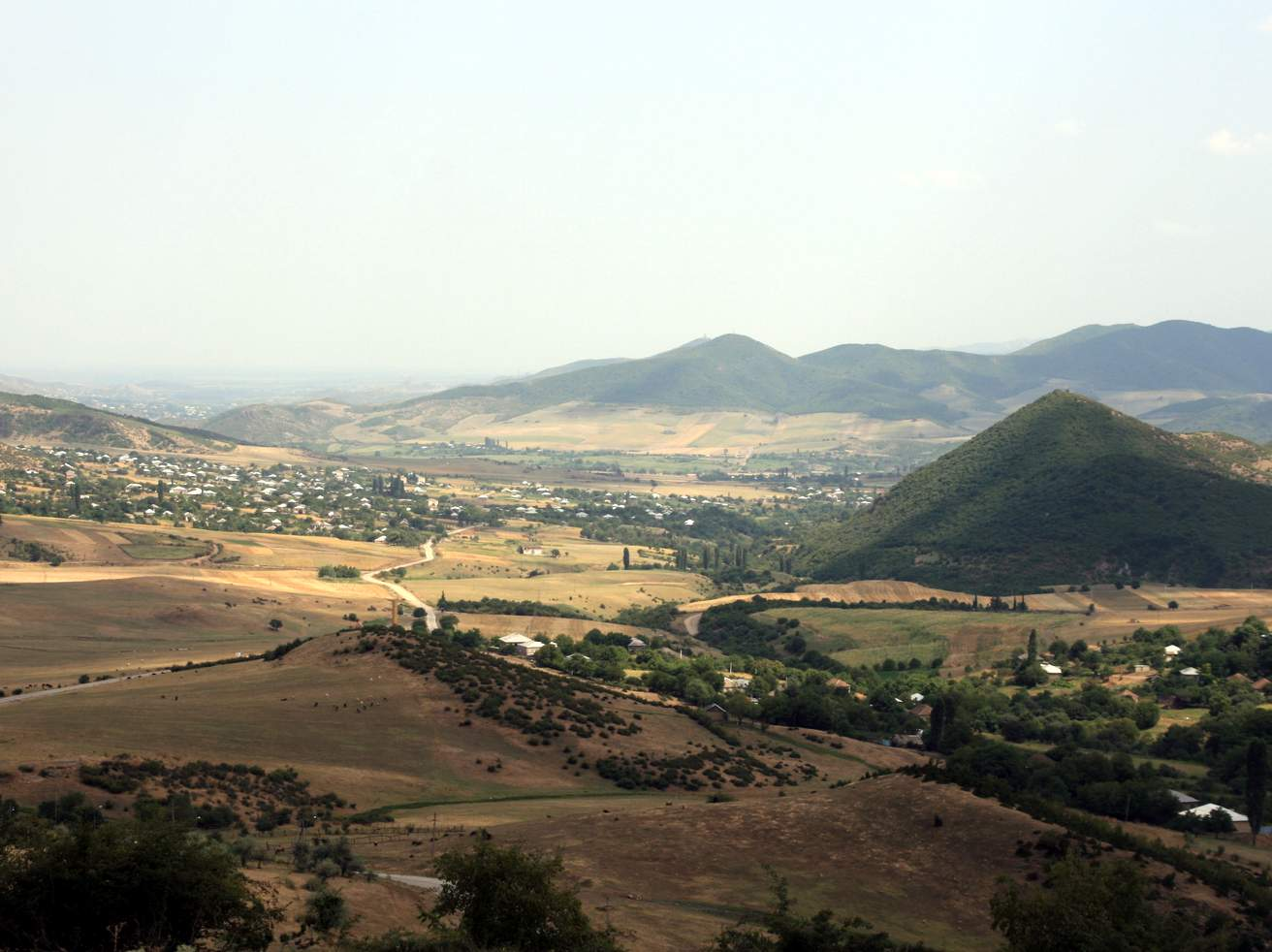

- Location within Georgia Location within Kvemo Kartli
- Coordinates: 41°27′0″N 44°25′28″E
- Country: (Georgia (country)) Georgia
- Mkhare: Kvemo Kartli
- Municipality: Bolnisi
- Elevation: 760 m (2,490 ft)

Population (2014)
  - Total: 1,199
- Climate: Cfa

Dzveli Kveshi (Georgian: ძველი ქვეში, Azerbaijani: Zol-Göyəç) is a village in the Bolnisi Municipality of the Kvemo Kartli region of south-eastern Georgia. It is located on the left bank of the Getistskali River, at an altitude of 720 m above sea level. Distance to the municipality center Bolnisi is 13 kilometers.

== Demography ==
According to the 2002 population census of Georgia, the population of the village was 2,183 of which 98% were Azerbaijanis. As of 2014 census, the population of the village declined by 45% and was 1,199.
