= Talaveri =

Talaveri: ტალავერი; Faxralı
- Location within Georgia
- Coordinates: 41°22′22″N 44°38′30″E
- Country: (Georgia (country)) Georgia
- Mkhare: Kvemo Kartli
- Rayon: Bolnisi

Government
  - municipality: Nariman Abdiyev
- Elevation: 620 m (2,030 ft)

Population (2014)
  - Total: 5,038
- Climate: Cfa

Talaveri (Georgian: ტალავერი, Azerbaijani: Faxralı) is a village in the Bolnisi Municipality of the Kvemo Kartli region, Georgia.

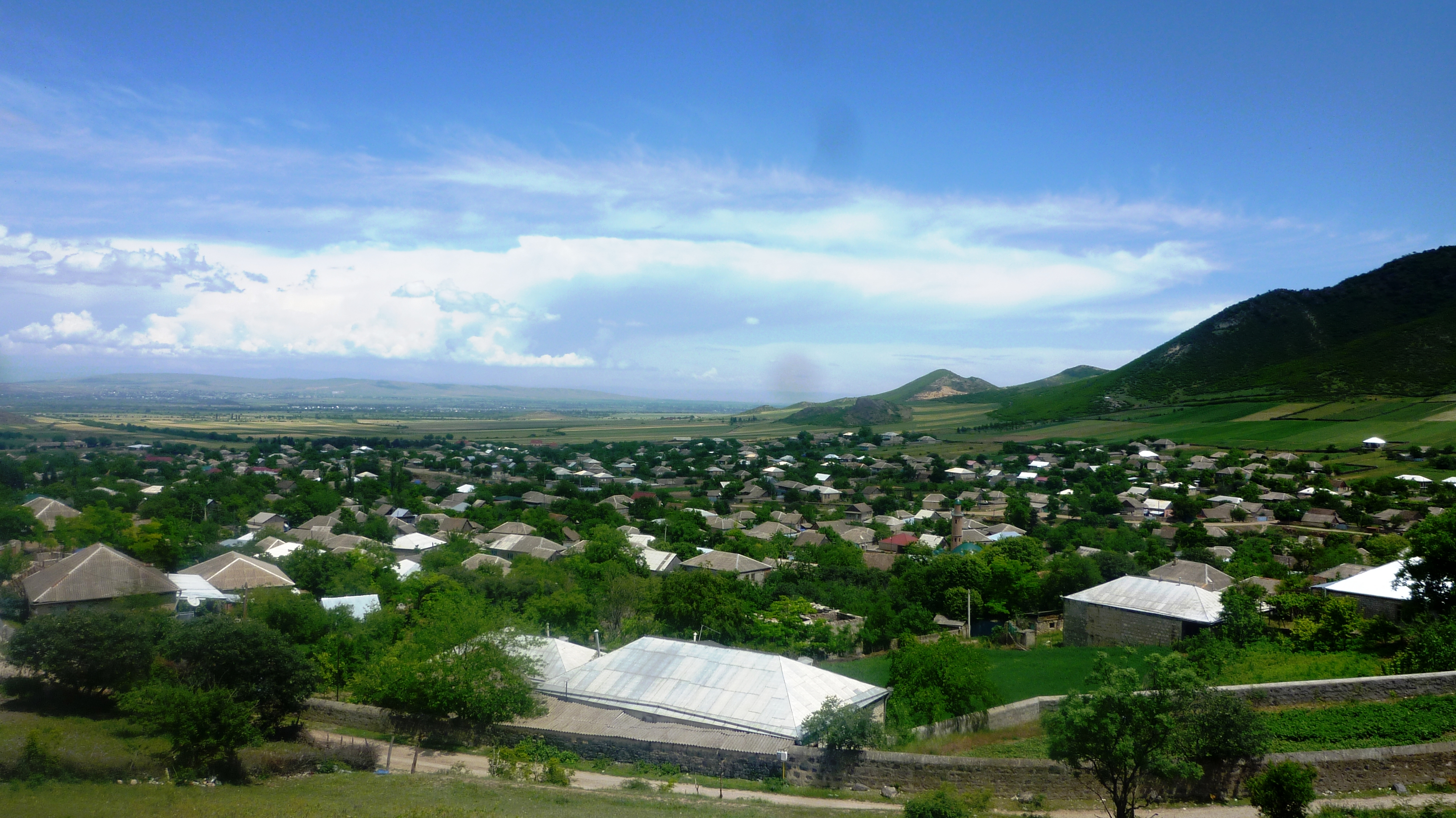
Talaveri village

== Geographical location ==
Talaveri is situated in the southwestern part of country, at 560 metres above sea level. The distance with the capital city Tbilisi is 40 kilometres and with municipality center of Bolnisi town it is 12 kilometres. It is the largest village in the Bolnisi municipality.

== Population ==
According to population census of Georgia in 2002 its population was 6,889 (12.2% of the Bolnisi Municipality) in 1495 family. Thus an average family had 4.6 children, placing Talaveri above the country's average. Gender structure (males/females) of population is 47:53. Such kind of distortion in the gender structure of inhabitants associates with high level of labor emigration form the village since collapse of Soviet Union. In accordance with official statistics 99% of inhabitants are Azerbaijanis.

== History ==
According to archeological findings the village was established in the late Middle Ages. In the 17th century it grew quickly due to incoming migration from Iran and modern Azerbaijan (Ganja, Gazakh and Karabakh). In 1919 the first secular school was established in the village.

During the rule of Zviad Gamsakhurdia, the village's name was changed to Talaveri, like many toponymes were Georgianized. However the villagers refused to recognise the new name and sent petitions to Georgian presidents to have the renaming decision revoked.

== Mosque incident ==
In September 2009, an incident occurred between representatives of fundamentalist Georgian Orthodox groups and inhabitants on the repairs of a local mosque. According to Human Rights Report 2009 of the US State Department, radical fundamentalist Georgian Orthodox groups blocked the reconstruction of a 1905 mosque. They demanded to see the villagers' construction permit, despite not having the legal right to do so, and threatened them with violence if the construction did not cease. The situation remained unsettled and the mosque repairs unfinished as of the end of the year.

== See also ==
- Azerbaijanis in Georgia
- Bolnisi
- Sadakhlo
- Kizilajlo
- Kvemo Kartli
