= Gadachrili Gora =

Archaeological site in Georgia

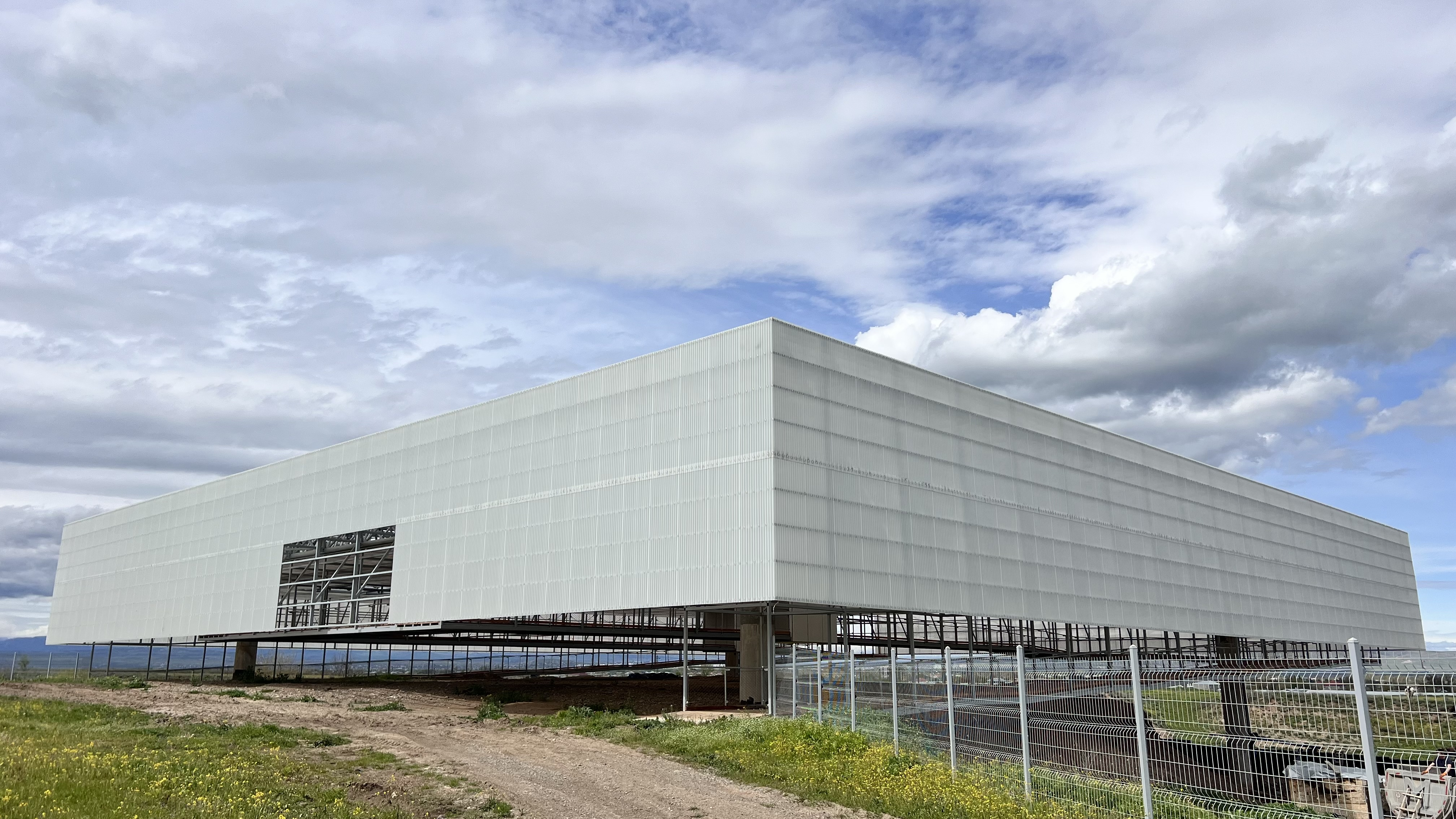
Gadachrili Gora.

Gadachrili Gora (Georgian: გადაჭრილი გორა) is a Neolithic archaeological site located near the village of Imiri in the Marneuli Municipality of Kvemo Kartli, Georgia. The original settlement belongs to the Neolithic Shulaveri–Shomu culture, but was later repurposed as a burial ground, with tombs belonging to the Kura–Araxes culture dating back to the Early Bronze Age. It has yielded some of the earliest archaelogical evidence of the domestication of wheat, wild grapevine and winemaking.

== Location ==
Location of Marneuli in Georgia

The site is situated near the Kura river in Kvemo Kartli, south of Marneuli. The Shulaveri stream cuts through the site, exposing a natural cross-section of the entire mound. This natural section, along with surface-collected materials, provides a general understanding of the site's character.

== Archaeology ==
The thickness of the construction horizons in the central section of the mound reaches 4–5 metres. Near the approximate centre of the settlement, a mudbrick building is visible, with an almost entirely preserved dome reaching 1 metre in height. Despite the fragmentary nature of the material, the pottery from the site displays characteristics typical of the ceramic production of Shulaveris Gora. Excavations conducted in 2012 and 2013 by the CNRS Trajectoires laboratory in collaboration with the Georgian National Museum, directed by Mindia Jalabadze and Caroline Hamon, revealed two preserved occupation levels. Radiocarbon dating places these occupations between 5920 and 5720 Cal BC. The excavations uncovered occupation levels combining circular buildings of varying dimensions with open "courtyard" spaces used for circulation or as dumping grounds. The upper horizon revealed a structuring of the habitat around a large central circular building, while the lower levels suggest complex episodes of dwelling destruction and reconstruction. A sequence of soil levels was also uncovered, with built and rammed circulation levels in raw earth alternating with episodes of significant ash and charcoal waste. Several architectural techniques were identified for the construction of raw earth buildings, mainly mudbricks of various sizes and cob. These techniques draw parallels with construction methods used during the same period in northern Iran and Mesopotamia, contributing to the debate on the origins of the Shulaveri-Shomu culture. A high density of storage structures was identified, with abundant botanical remains preserved to a depth of 60 cm. These structures are located in close proximity to the buildings, organised in areas reserved for storage — individually between rows of interconnected circular buildings or inside the buildings themselves. Other features including raw earth hearths, pits, and dumping of faunal remains were also identified.

=== Lithic Material ===
The knapped stone material recovered from the site numbers 114 units, of which 77 are represented by blades. Among these, 25 are unretouched. Common tools include burins, scrapers, borers, and backed bladelets. A fragment of a wedge-shaped stone axe and 4 bone awls were also discovered. The material is held at the Simon Janashia Museum of Georgia.

=== Wheat remains ===
Excavations at Gadachrili Gora and the neighbouring site of Shulaveris Gora have produced the earliest known direct evidence of bread wheat (Triticum aestivum). Grains of bread wheat and of goatgrass (Aegilops tauschii), a wild progenitor of the species, were recovered from Neolithic deposits radiocarbon dated to 5922–5832 and 5808–5747 cal BC, and a wheat-spike impression survives in a mudbrick. Hulled barley, lentils, and bitter vetch were identified among the other crops. The finds support the South Caucasus as an independent centre of early bread wheat domestication.

== Winemaking Discovery ==
Gadachrili Gora is most internationally renowned for yielding the earliest known evidence of winemaking. Grape seeds recovered from the site established Georgia as the birthplace of wine, with evidence of winemaking dating back over 8,000 years. The discovery was named one of the ten most important archaeological discoveries in the world for 2017 by Archaeology, the international scientific journal of the Archaeological Institute of America.

== GRAPE Project ==
The Gadachrili Gora Regional Archaeological Project Expedition (GRAPE) is a joint venture between the University of Toronto, the Georgian National Museum, and the National Wine Agency of the Ministry of Agriculture of the Republic of Georgia. The project investigates the emergence and evolution of prehistoric cultures in southern Caucasia and the development of horticultural practices, with a focus on viticulture and viniculture. GRAPE represents the archaeological component of a larger interdisciplinary project sponsored by the Georgian national government, entitled Research and Popularization of Georgian Grape and Wine Culture. Excavations are directed by Mindia Jalabadze of the Georgian National Museum and Stephen Batiuk of ArchaeoTek and the University of Toronto. The project investigates the Neolithic (6000–5200 BCE) and Chalcolithic (5000–3500 BCE) periods of occupation across a series of rural settlements in the Middle Kura region, examining the Neolithic landscape and its changes through time.

== Museum ==
Construction work is currently underway at the archaeological site, with plans to build a museum at Gadachrili Gora. In the meantime, the archaeological site has been conserved.

== See also ==
- Early and simple domes

== Bibliography ==
Results of the Archaeological Expedition of Kvemo Kartli (1965–1971). Tbilisi, 1975.
