= Kazreti =

Kazreti კაზრეთი
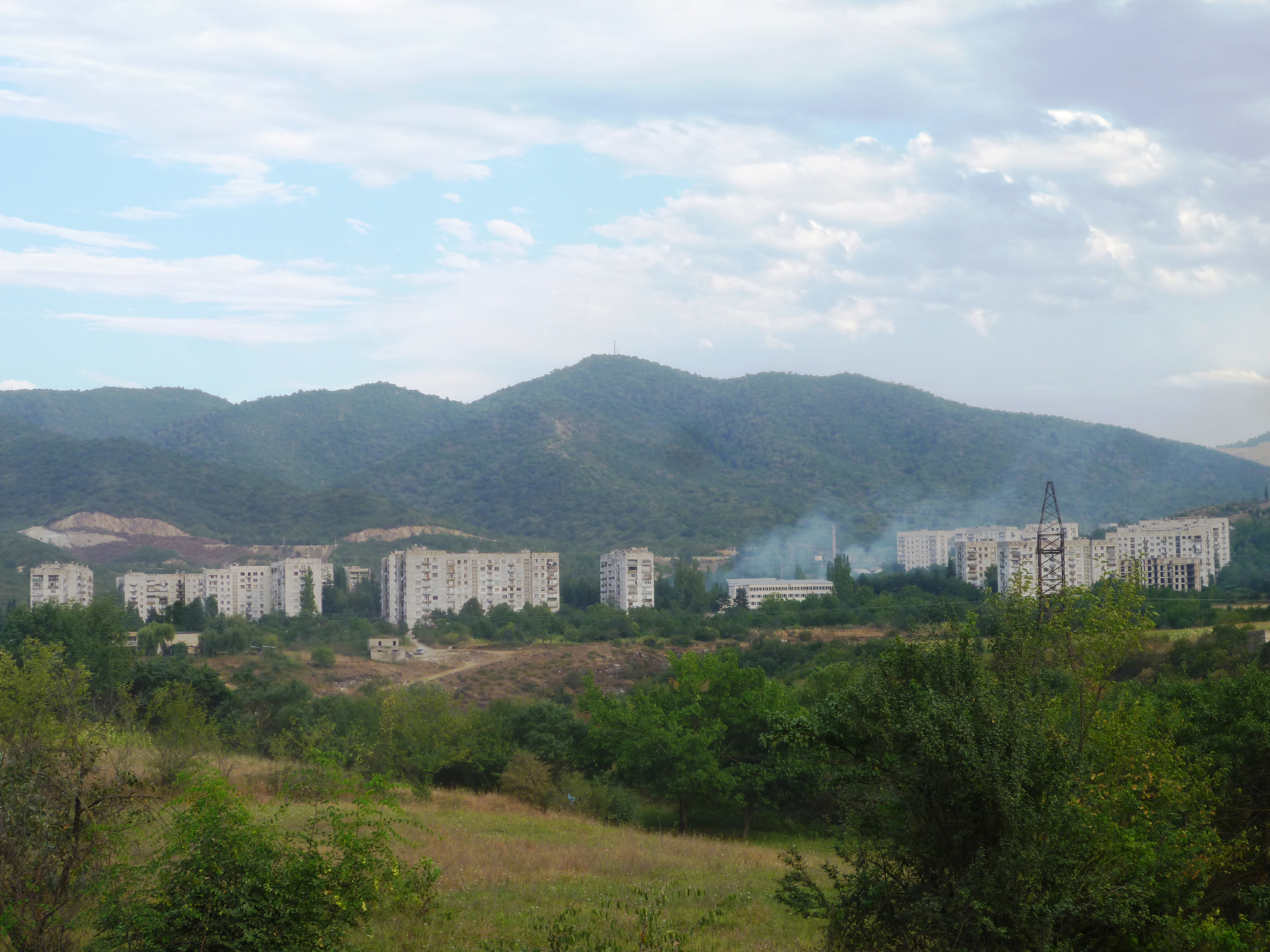
- Kazreti, view from mountain
- Interactive map of Kazreti
- Location in Georgia Kazreti (Kvemo Kartli)
- Coordinates: 41°22′39″N 44°24′47″E
- Country: Georgia (country)
- Mkhare: Kvemo Kartli
- Municipality: Bolnisi
- Elevation: 420 m (1,380 ft)

Population (2014)
  - Total: 4 340

Kazreti (Georgian: კაზრეთი) is a daba in Bolnisi Municipality, in the region of Kvemo Kartli, in Georgia. Its primary economic activity is mining. The largest employer in Kazreti is JSC RMG Copper. Gold and copper are the principal precious metals extracted at the mines in Kazreti. Historical research done in Georgia has shown that gold was mined in the area thousands of years ago. It has been speculated that the earliest gold mine in the world was the Sakdrisi site on the outskirts of Kazreti.

The mine in Kazreti was developed in 1970 during the Soviet era. From 1970 until the collapse of the Soviet Union, Kazreti was generally known in Georgia as being a cosmopolitan village, inhabited by workers from the various Soviet republics. Following the collapse of the Soviet Union, the majority of people who now live in the town are of Georgian nationality.

Kazreti has been the site of various environmental and labor protests during both the UNM and GD governments. In 2014 there were numerous protests and hunger strikes related to working conditions in the mines.

There are two public schools, a library, and a small police station in Kazreti. Latitude 41.379963, longitude 44.410007, elevation 699 meters.

== See also ==
- Kvemo Kartli
