= Tsalka Plateau =

Plateau in central Georgia

- Plateau
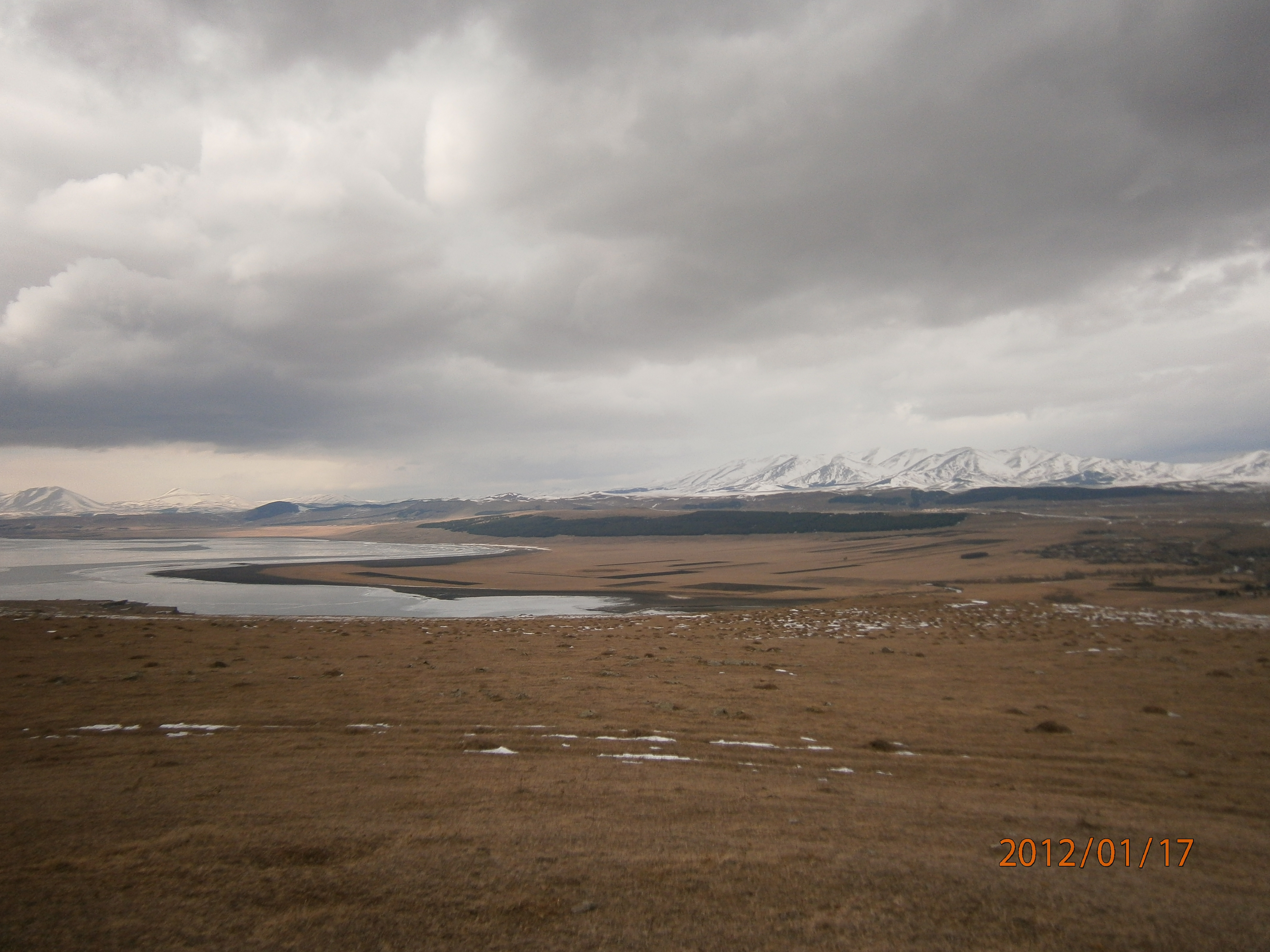
- View on the Tsalka Plateau.

- Coordinates: 41°37′00″N 44°00′00″E
- Location: Kvemo Kartli, Georgia
- Part of: Javakheti Plateau
- Geology: volcanic plateau

The Tsalka Plateau (Georgian: წალკის ქვაბული) is a volcanic plateau in central Georgia, in the upper reaches of the Khrami River, roughly corresponding to the territory of the Tsalka Municipality and a small portion of the adjacent Borjomi Municipality. It is considered part of the greater Javakheti Plateau.

== Geography ==
The Tsalka Plateau is located at the altitude of 1500 to 1700 metres and occupies 398.3 square kilometres in total. The elevated parts are covered by grasslands, whereas the lower parts are used for agricultural purposes. The average yearly temperature is 5.9°C, with 4.8°C in January and 16°C in July. The annual precipitation rate is 740 millimetres. The Tsalka Reservoir occupies the centre of the plateau.

Most likely covered largely by forests from Neolithic through Middle Bronze Age ca. 1500 BC, the land today represents mainly ancient dolomitic lava and is largely infertile. Before the Soviet Union, crop growing on the plateau was hindered by severe weather conditions, hail and field mice, which is why animal husbandry and beekeeping were more preferred forms of agriculture.

The Tsalka plateau is home to the ancient Trialeti culture, with tumuli dating back to the second millennium BC, discovered in the 1930s. Some tumuli have stone-lined "procession ways" of more than 100 metres in length, sometimes linking them to each other.
