= Bolnisi Municipality =

Coordinates: 41.4500°N 44.5333°E

Bolnisi Municipality ბოლნისის მუნიციპალიტეტი Bolnisi bələdiyyəsi
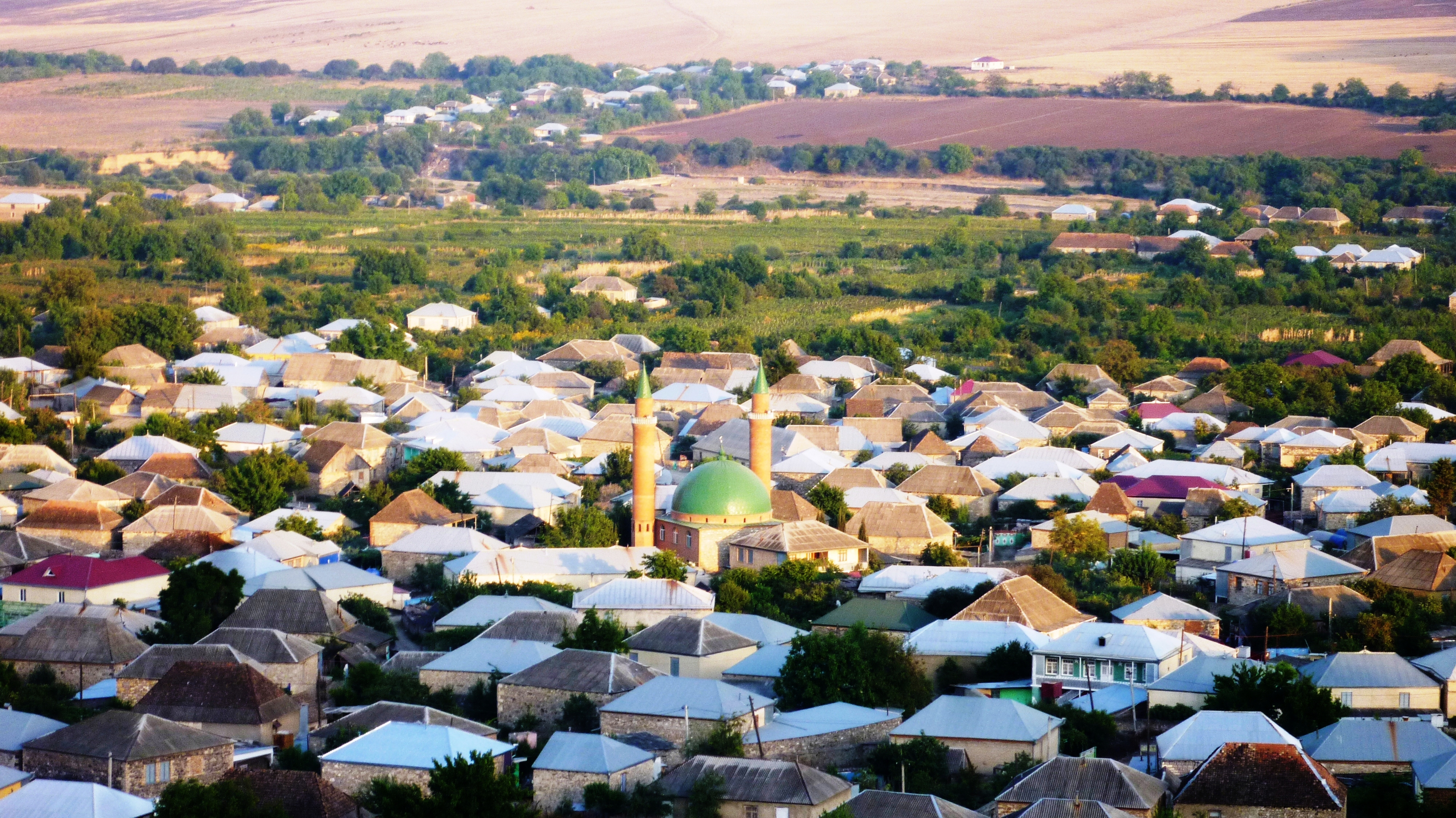
- Mosque in lower Bolnisi

- Flag Seal

- Interactive map of Bolnisi Municipality
- Country: Georgia
- Mkhare: Kvemo Kartli
- Administrative centre: Bolnisi

Government
  - Type: Mayor–Council
  - Body: Bolnisi Municipal Assembly
  - Mayor: David Sherazadishvili (GD)

Area
  - Total: 804 km^{2} (310 sq mi)

Population (2021)
  - Total: 56,036
  - Density: 69.7/km^{2} (181/sq mi)

Population by ethnicity
  - Azerbaijanis: 63.4 %
  - Georgians: 30.9 %
  - Armenians: 5.0 %
- Time zone: Georgian Time
- Website: http://bolnisi.gov.ge/

Bolnisi (Georgian: ბოლნისის მუნიციპალიტეტი, romanized: Bolnisis munitsip’alit’et’i, Azerbaijani: Bolnisi bələdiyyəsi) is a municipality in Georgia's southern region of Kvemo Kartli, covering an area of 804 km^{2} (310 sq mi). As of 2021, it had a population of 56,036 people. The city of Bolnisi is its administrative centre.

== Geographical location ==
Bolnisi Municipality is situated in the south of the country, bordering Tetritsqaro Municipality to the north, Marneuli Municipality to the east, and Dmanisi Municipality to the west. The municipality also shares a border with Armenia to its south.

Most of the municipality is occupied by low mountain ranges, which are forested in the south and reach hights of around 1,300 m on the northwestern ridges. The highest point is Mt Loki at 2,142 m (7,028 ft) above sea level.

== Administrative divisions ==
Bolnisi municipality is administratively divided into 14 communities (თემი, temi) with 46 villages (სოფელი, sopeli), two urban-type settlements (დაბა, daba) and one city (ქალაკი, kalaki).

- city: Bolnisi;
- daba: Kazreti and Tamarisi.
- the largest village is Talaveri. Other villages in the municipality include Akaurta, Darbazi, Dzveli Kveshi, Kvemo Bolnisi, Kveshi, Mamjuti, Najiduri, Ratevani, Rachisubani, Talaveri, and Tandzia.

== Population ==
The population of Bolnisi was 56,036 at the beginning of 2021, which is an increase of nearly 5% since the last census of 2014. In 2014 the ethnic composition was 63.4% Azerbaijani, 30.9% Georgian and 5.0% Armenian. The population density is 69.7 people per square kilometer (2021).

Population Bolnisi Municipality
	1897	1922	1926	1939	1959	1970	1979	1989	2002	2014	2021
Bolnisi Municipality	-	-	-	33,975	▲45,019	▲60,556	▲68,296	▲81,920	▼74,301	▼53,590	▲56,036
Bolnisi (Note: Until 1921 called Katharinenfeld, between 1921-1943 called Luxemburg.)	-	4,591	▲5,658	▲7,137	▲12,420	▼11,504	▲12,442	▲15,047	▼9,944	▼8,967	▼8,288
Kazreti (daba)	-	-	-	-	-	2,538	▲5,921	▲9,124	▼7,272	▼4,340	▲5,483
Tamarisi (daba)	-	-	-	-	-	-	-	707	▼434	▲510	▲697
Data: Population statistics Georgia 1897 to present. Note: (Note: The 2014 census found an inexplicable gap with the data from the national statistical office Geostat. UN-assisted research has found the 2002 census was inflated by about 8-9 percent. See, "1. Introduction", Page 1.)

== Politics ==
Bolnisi Municipal Assembly (Georgian: ბოლნისის საკრებულო) is the representative body in Bolnisi Municipality, consisting of 36 members which are elected every four years. The last election was held in October 2021. David Sherazadishvili of Georgian Dream was reelected as mayor.

Party	2017	2021	Current Municipal Assembly
Georgian Dream	28	30	
United National Movement	2	6	
Total	30	36	

== Gallery ==
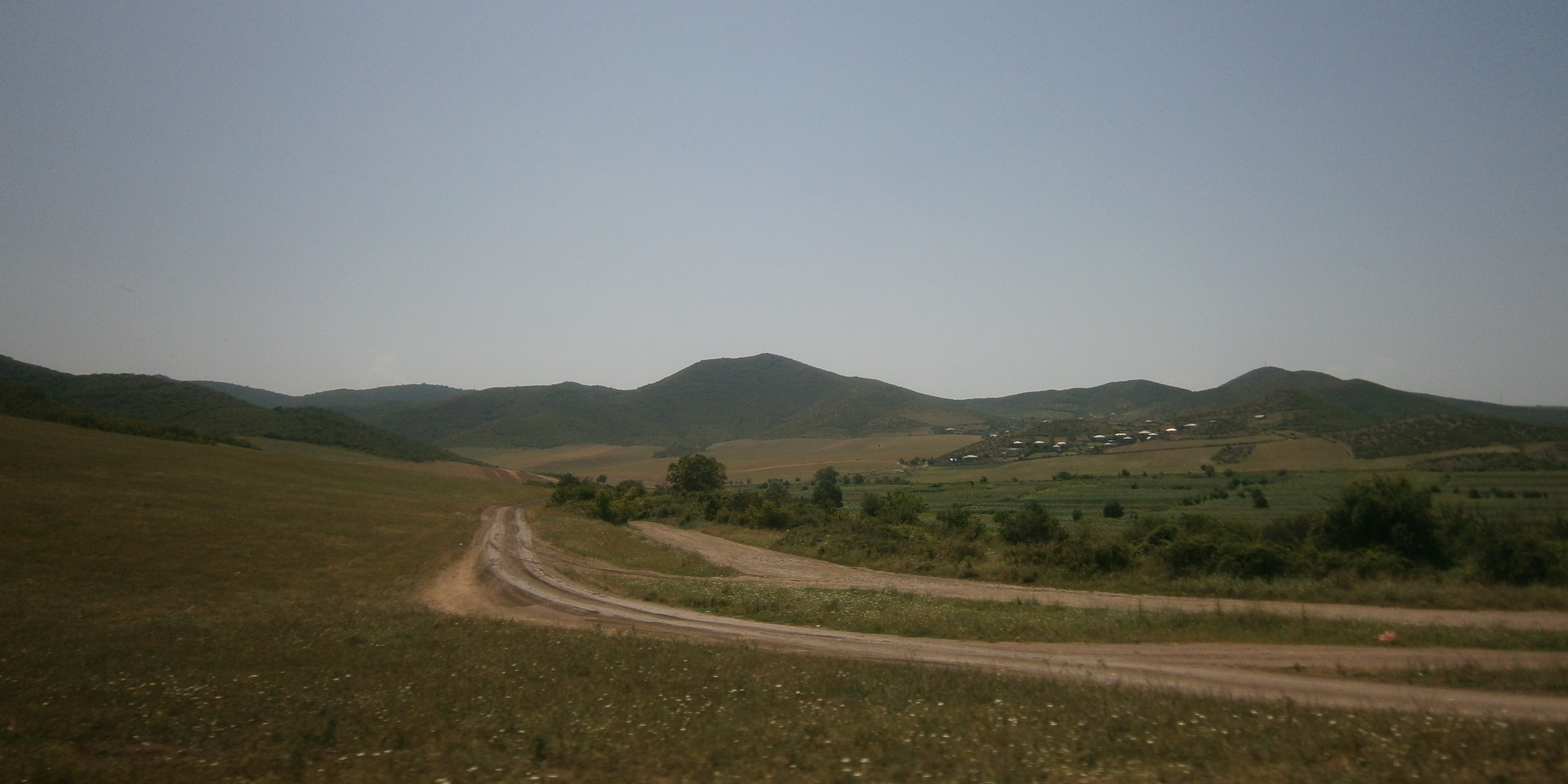
Field in the Bolnisi municipality

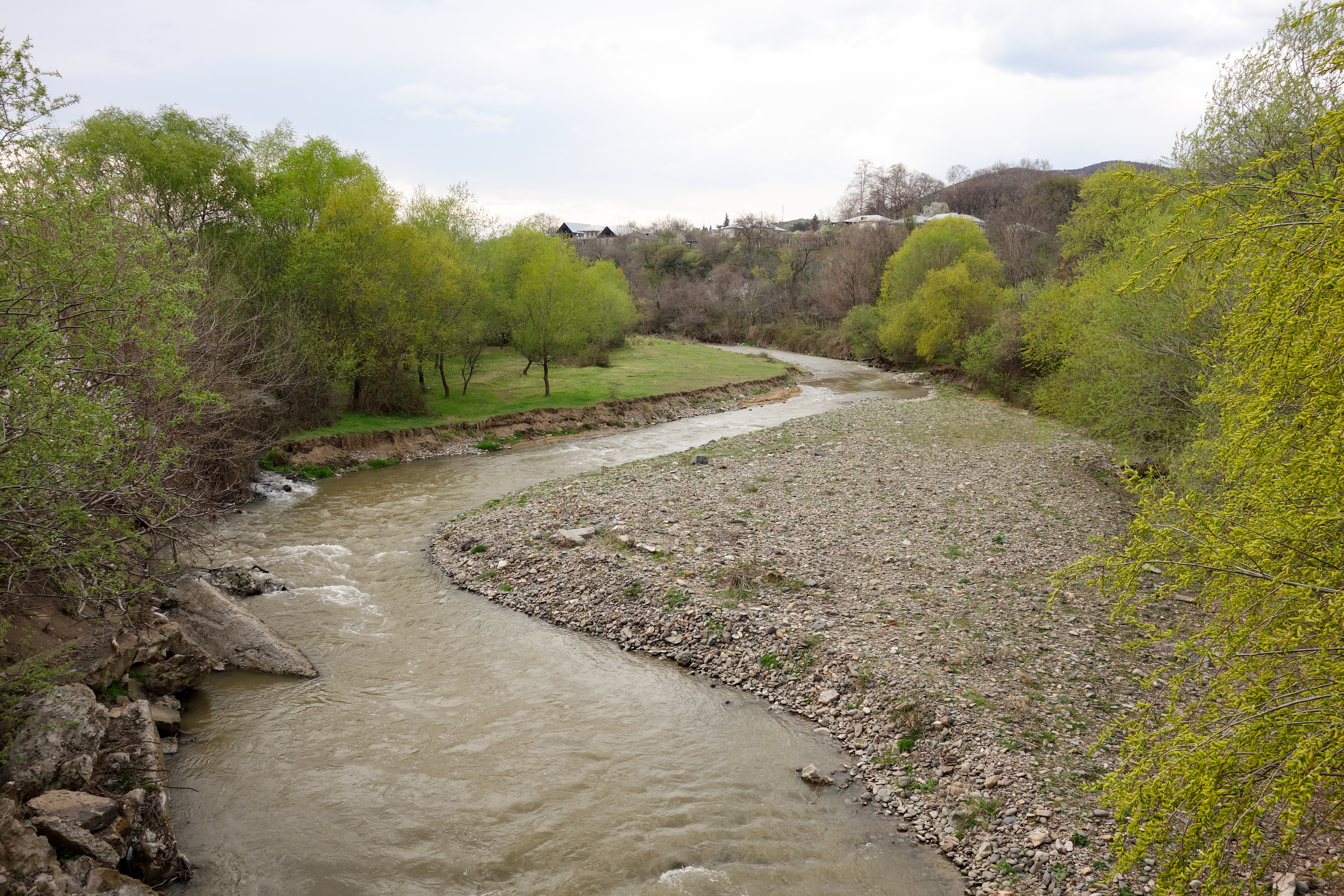
Mashavera River

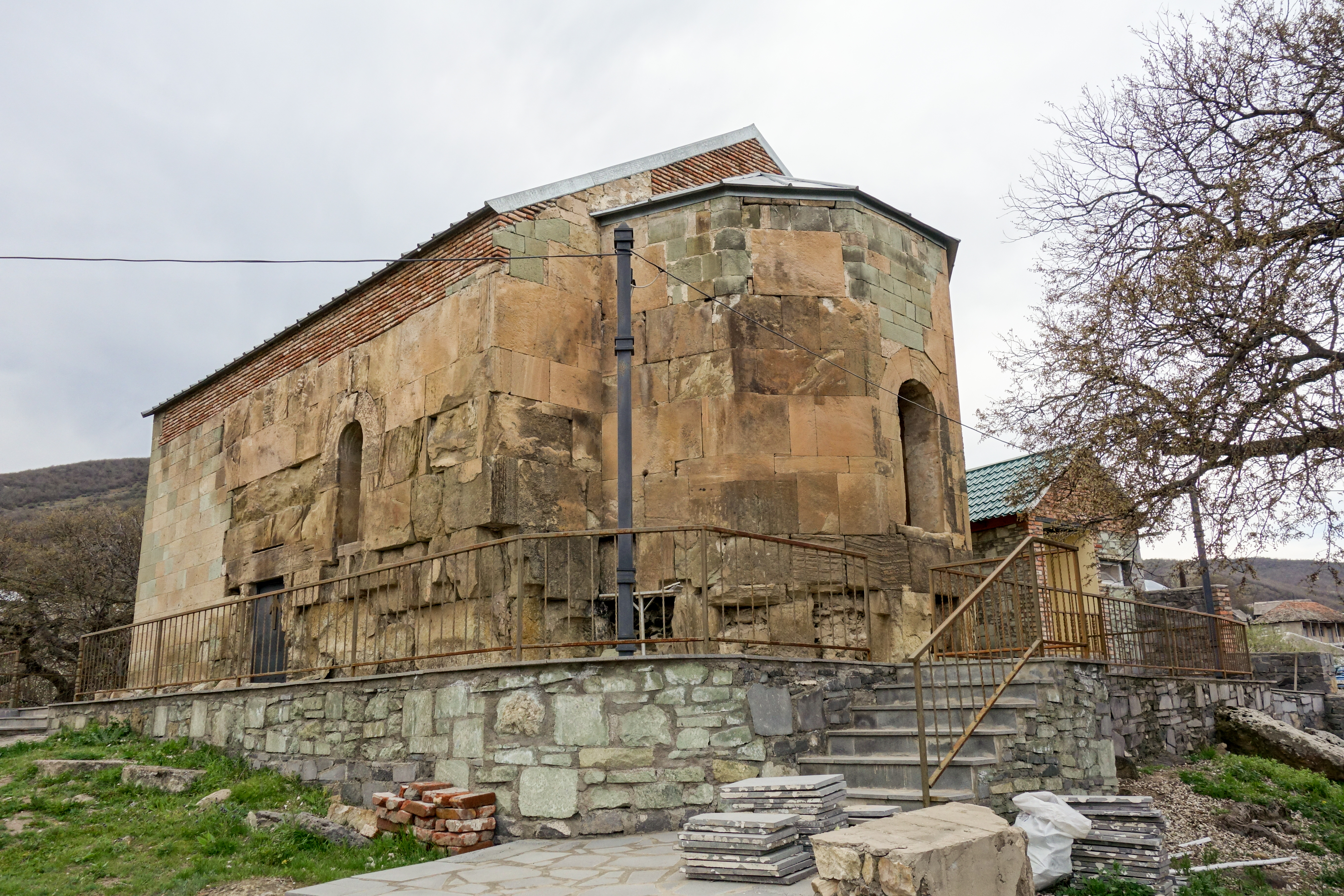
Church of the Dormition in Akaurta

Kveshi Fortress

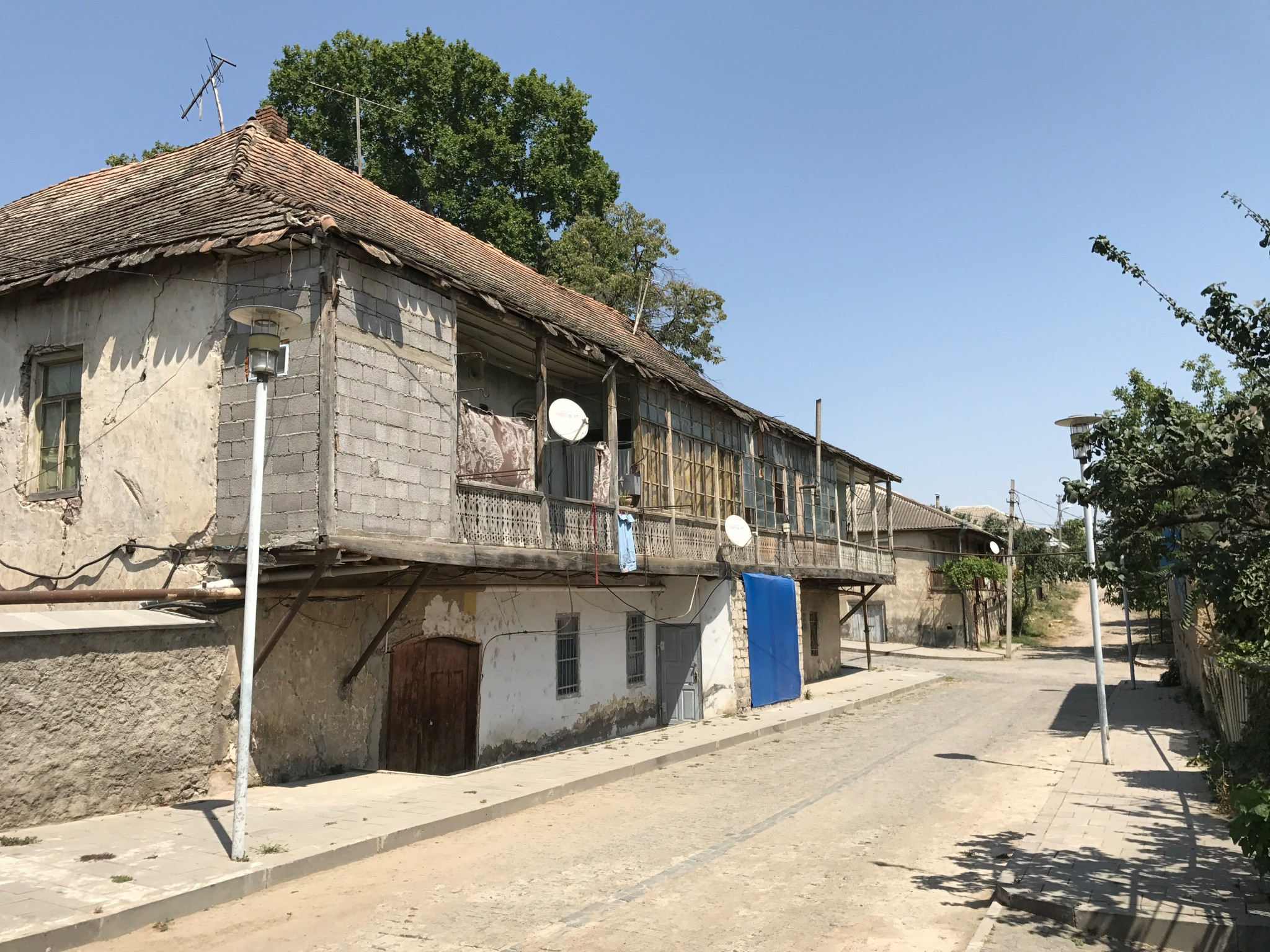
German houses in Bolnisi

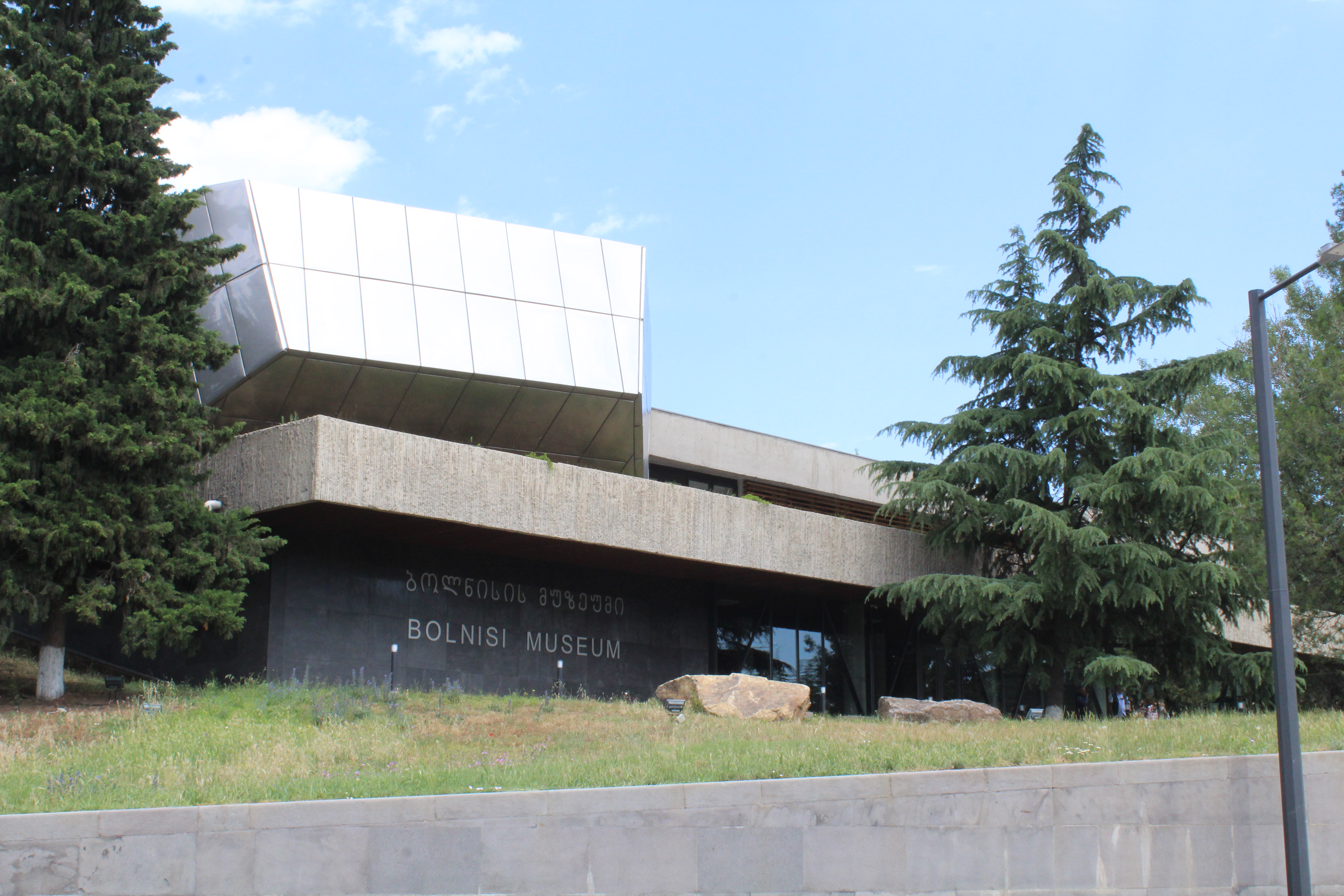
Bolnisi Museum

== See also ==
- List of municipalities in Georgia (country)
