= Kizilajlo =

Kizilajlo ყიზილ-აჯლო Qızılhacılı
- Village
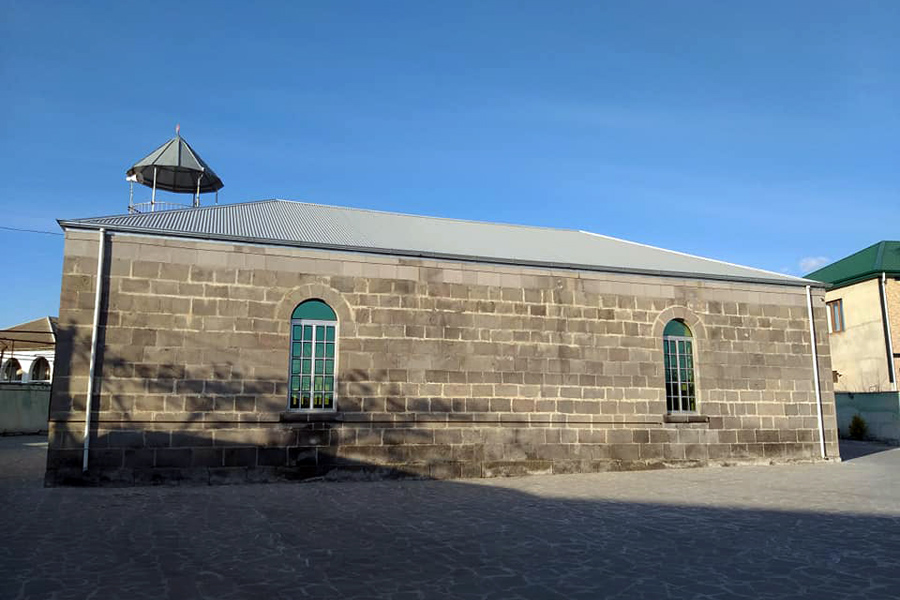
- Kizilajlo Mosque

- Location within Georgia Location within Kvemo Kartli
- Coordinates: 41°28′43″N 44°46′21″E
- Country: Georgia
- Mkhare: Kvemo Kartli
- Municipality: Marneuli
- Elevation: 420 m (1,380 ft)

Population (2014)
  - Total: 7,291
- Time zone: UTC+4 (Georgian Time)

Kizilajlo (Georgian: ყიზილაჯლო, romanized: q'izilajlo) or Qizilhajili (Azerbaijani: Qızılhacılı) is a village of nearly 7,300 residents (2014) in Georgia’s southern Marneuli Municipality (Kvemo Kartli region). The village is attached on the west side of the residential area of Marneuli city, the municipal center, at roughly 400 to 450 metres above sea level and about 50 kilometres (31 mi) south of Tbilisi. Kizilajlo is the second largest village in the municipality after Sadakhlo. It is a so called independent village (სოფელი, sopeli) that is not part of a grouped community (თემი, temi).

Kizilajlo is rather inconspicuous in the shadow of the city of Marneuli, but the suburban village is notorious for violence, intimidation and fraud during election time.

== Demographics ==
Kizilajlo had a population of 7,291 according to the 2014 census. Apart from a few dozen Georgians and Armenian, the village is mono-ethnic Azerbaijani (99.4%).

Year	1897	1923	1939	1959	1970	1979	1989	2002	2014
Number	-	,.435	-	-	▲4,500	▲5,298	-	▲7,124	▲7,291
Data: 1923 1970, 1979, Census 2002 and 2014 Note: (Note: The 2014 census found an inexplicable gap with the data from the national statistical office Geostat. UN-assisted research has found the 2002 census was inflated by about 8-9 percent. See, "1. Introduction", Page 1.)

== Sights ==
The 19th century mosque in Kizilajlo was granted the status of a cultural heritage monument in March 2012 by decree of the Georgian Minister of Culture and Monument to legally protect its historical and cultural value.

== Transport ==
The road of international importance S6 (E117) passes through Kizilajlo. This road connects Tbilisi via Marneuli and Bolnisi with the Armenian border at Guguti. This is also the only connection for the village to other places.

The railwayline Marneuli - Bolnisi - Kazreti passes through the village, but has no station here. The line is also no longer in use for passenger traffic. The nearest station is in Marneuli, from where trains depart for Tbilisi, Sadakhlo and Yerevan.

== See also ==
- Azerbaijanis in Georgia
- Fakhralo
- Tamarisi
