= Azerbaijanis in Georgia =

Ethnic group

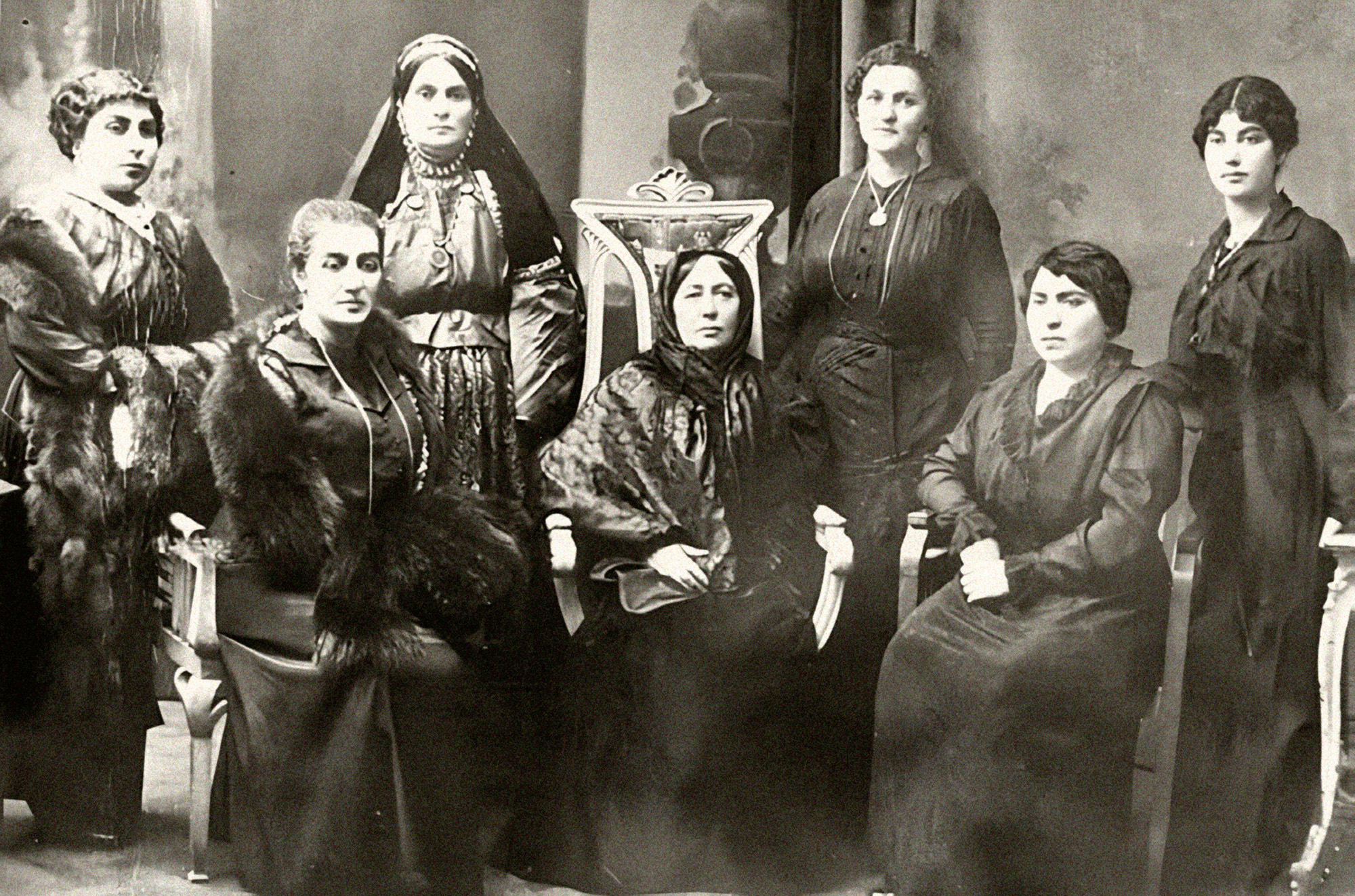
- Azerbaijani women of Tbilisi, 1910

Total population
- 233,024 (2014)

Regions with significant populations
- Kvemo Kartli · Kakheti · Shida Kartli · Mtskheta-Mtianeti

Languages
- Azerbaijani · Georgian

Religion
- Majority Shia Islam, Minority Sunni Islam or irreligious

Related ethnic groups
- Meskhetian Turks

Azerbaijanis in Georgia or Georgian Azerbaijanis (Azerbaijani: Gürcüstan azərbaycanlıları; Georgian: ქართველი აზერბაიჯანელები), also known as Borchali Azerbaijanis (Azerbaijani: Borçalı Azərbaycanlıları), are Georgian citizens of an ethnic Azerbaijani background. According to the 2014 census, there are 233,024 ethnic Azerbaijanis living in Georgia.

Azerbaijanis comprise 6.5% of Georgia's population and are the country's largest ethnic minority, inhabiting mostly rural areas like Kvemo Kartli, Kakheti, Shida Kartli and Mtskheta-Mtianeti. There is also a historical Azerbaijani community in the capital city of Tbilisi (previously known as Tiflis), and smaller communities in other regions. There were some tensions in the late 1980s in the Azerbaijani-populated regions of Georgia; however, they never escalated to armed clashes.

== History ==
=== Middle Ages ===
Starting in the sixteenth century, as the Turkoman invasions devastated southern Georgia, Qizilbash tribes started migrating and settling on both banks of the Kura River in Lower Kartli, in the valleys of Algeti and Ktsia, in the Dabnisi Gorge, and in Somkhiti. By the beginning of the seventeenth century, they spread eastward into fertile lands of Karaiazi (modern-day Gardabani Municipality) and in the west, they reached Shulaveri and the Dmanisi Gorge. Their consolidation led to the formation of the Azerbaijani community. The area populated by ethnic Azerbaijanis today is known as historical Borchali (which in the form Burjoglu was originally the name of a Turkic tribe that settled there in the seventeenth century). In 1604, during the reign of Safavid shah Abbas I, the Borchaly khanate (sultanate) was established here. The Sultanate of Borchali existed from 1604 to 1755 with its capital in Aghjagala (a mediaeval fortress whose ruins nowadays lie near Kushchi, Marneuli Municipality), later turned into a mouravate (district) under the suzerainty of the Georgian kingdom of Kartli-Kakheti. Furthermore, up to 15,000 Turkic-speaking families had been resettled in Kakheti at the beginning of the seventeenth century by Abbas I of Persia following a series of punitive campaigns he had launched against his Georgian subject, Teimuraz I. However, those settlers were almost entirely annihilated less than a decade later in the course of a Georgian uprising in Kakheti. The area of Azerbaijani settlement spread northward into the Tsalka Plateau throughout the eighteenth century and further westward into Bashkechid (modern Dmanisi Municipality and its vicinity) by the early nineteenth century.

=== Imperial Russian rule ===
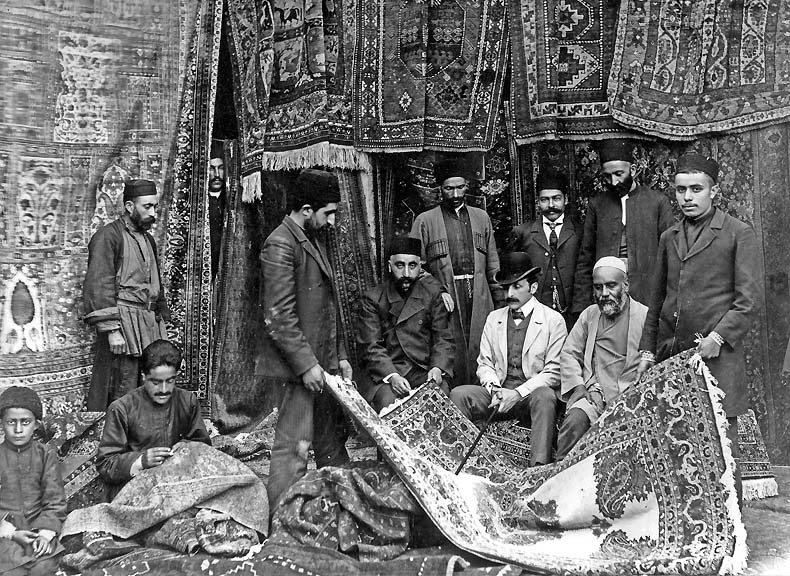
Muslim merchants selling rugs in Tiflis, ca. 1900

After Russia conquered the South Caucasus and Dagestan from Qajar Iran following the Russo-Persian War (1804–1813), the Russo-Persian War (1826–1828) and the out-coming treaties of Gulistan and Turkmenchay, the government reorganised the Georgian kingdom into a governorate, with subdivisions of its own, five of which were referred to as the Tatar ranges (the Czarist nomenclature used the word "Tatar" for Azerbaijani), namely Borchali, Pambak, Shuragel, Kazakh, and Shamshadin. In 1868, the latter two became part of the Elizavetpol Governorate, while the former three were incorporated into the Tiflis Governorate as the Borchali uyezd. The plains of the uyezd were mainly Azerbaijani-populated: out of 63 villages in the Borchali Plain covering 390 square versts (equal to 444 square kilometres) of land, 61 were populated with Azerbaijanis.

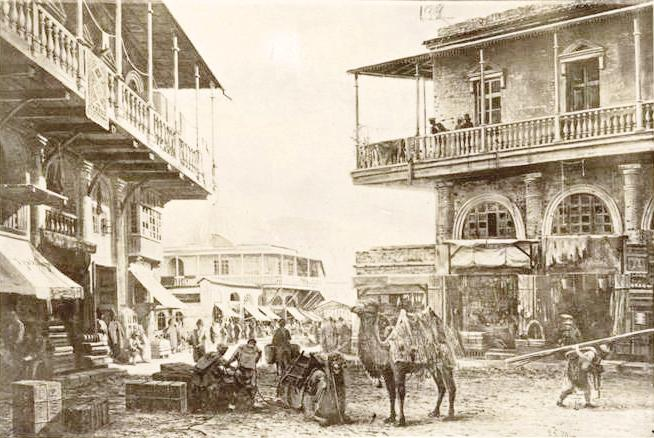
Azerbaijani quarter of Tbilisi, 1870

In Tiflis, Azerbaijanis have historically populated the neighbourhood of Ortachala (from Azerbaijani orta, meaning "central, middle", and Georgian ჭალა (ch'ala), meaning "green coastal area"), also known as Maidan (Azerbaijani: Meydan, meaning "square") or Sheitanbazar (Azerbaijani: Şeytanbazar, meaning "Devil's market"), as well as Seidabad (Azerbaijani: Seyidabad; "city of sayyids"), the old baths district.

In November 1905, Tiflis almost became an arena of Armenian–Azerbaijani ethnic clashes, which had already affected and caused violent conflicts and massacres in the rest of the South Caucasus. Militia units of the Armenian nationalist Dashnaktsutiun party seized control of key positions. The Azerbaijanis were assisted by 2,000 mounted volunteers from Borchali. By three o'clock in the afternoon on 27 November 1905 there were already 22 killed and wounded. In response, social democrat labourer activists organised a peaceful rally, calling on both parties not to engage in a conflict, and managed to acquire arms from the Viceroyalty of the Caucasus in order to patrol the streets. Following mediation, both sides came to a peaceful agreement on 1 December 1905, and the Borchalians left the city.

In 1919, during Georgia's brief independence, 34-year-old Parikhanim Sofiyeva, an Azerbaijani woman from the village of Karajalari near Karaiazi, won the parliament election in her constituency, becoming the first democratically elected Muslim woman in the history of the Caucasus and one of only five Georgian female MPs at the time.

=== Soviet Georgia ===
Under Soviet rule, Azerbaijanis constituted the third largest ethnic minority in the country (after Armenians and Russians), but their numbers grew constantly due to a high birth rate, almost twice as high as for ethnic Georgians as of 1989, as well as a low rate of immigration. Due to this, the numbers of Azerbaijanis rose to make them Georgia's largest minority ethnic group by 2002.

After Soviet occupation, many Azerbaijanis left Georgia for Azerbaijan proper due to Soviet policies discouraging them from working in fields like administration. In March 1944, 3,240 ethnic Azerbaijanis and Kurds living in the capital city of Tbilisi were forcibly relocated to rural parts of Kvemo Kartli, as persons "deliberately avoiding working in the agricultural sector". Only 31 Azerbaijani families were permitted to stay in Tbilisi, mostly military personnel, handicapped war veterans, and university students.

In 1944, in the midst of the population transfer in the Soviet Union, a decree was issued by the Moscow-seated government, according to which tens of thousands of residents of the southern border regions of Georgia were to be forcibly relocated to Central Asia for national security reasons. The decree made provision for the relocation of Meskhetian Turks, Kurds, Hamsheni Armenians and "others", though the latter category underlyingly referred to Azerbaijanis living in Samtskhe-Javakheti and Ajara. Georgian NKVD officers made no distinction between the Azerbaijanis and the key deportation target groups, as together with Kurds and Hamsheni Armenians, they were seen as "Turkish-oriented". In 1949, it was revealed that out of almost 100,000 deportees, 24,304 were Azerbaijanis.

Azerbaijanis living in rural parts of the country were mainly engaged in agriculture and animal husbandry in kolkhozes and sovkhozes, as well as small-scale trade and industry. Farmer unions were assigned relatively small units of land, which, however, gave more output than most state-owned lands elsewhere in Georgia. Factors such as fertile land, the proximity of the capital city, and easy access to major Soviet markets allowed Azerbaijani farmers to enjoy relatively prosperous lives, according to Soviet standards. Azerbaijanis also occupied many top posts in local governments across Kvemo-Kartli.

In the late 1980s, most ethnic Azerbaijanis occupying local government positions in the Azerbaijani-populated areas were removed from their positions. In 1989, there were changes in the ethnic composition of the local authorities and the resettlement of thousands of eco-migrants who had suffered from landslides in the mountainous region of Svaneti. The local Azerbaijani population, accepting of the migrants at first, demanded only to resolve the problem of Azerbaijani representation on the municipal level. The demands were ignored; later the eco-migrants, culturally different from the local population and facing social hardships, were accused of attacks and robbery against the Azerbaijanis, which in turn led to demonstrations, ethnic clashes between Svans and Azerbaijanis, demands for an Azerbaijani autonomy in Borchali and for the expulsion of Svan immigrants from Kvemo-Kartli.

=== Republic of Georgia ===
Previously not prone to migrating, Azerbaijanis became the second largest emigrating ethnic community in Georgia in the early 1990s, with three-quarters of these mainly rural emigrants leaving for Azerbaijan and the rest for Russia. Unlike other minority groups, many remaining Azerbaijanis cited attachment to their home communities and unwillingness to leave behind well-developed farms as their reason to stay. Furthermore, Georgian-born Azerbaijanis who immigrated to Azerbaijan at various times, including 50,000 Georgian-born spouses of Azerbaijani citizens, reported bureaucratic problems faced in Azerbaijan, with some unable to acquire Azerbaijani citizenship for nearly 20 years.

The good relations between the second Georgian President Eduard Shevardnadze and his former fellow Politburo member Heydar Aliyev, then president of Azerbaijan, ensured safety for Georgia's Azerbaijani community. However, Jonathan Wheatley characterises Shevardnadze's policy towards Kvemo-Kartli as "benign neglect", pursued through "patron-client linkages".

In 1995, Shevardnadze appointed Levan Mamaladze governor of the province of Kvemo-Kartli, even though the governor's duties were never clearly outlined in the legislature at the time. Mamaladze reportedly used his power to secure ethnic Azerbaijani votes for Shevardnadze and his political party and tolerated corruption in the region. According to Jonathan Wheatley, it was on Mamalalze's recommendation that six Azerbaijanis became Members of Parliament in the 1999 election and later joined the Alliance for a New Georgia that he had helped form. At the same time, members of the local government were dominated by ethnic Georgians appointed by him, including heads of all majority-Azerbaijani municipalities. In a 2003 interview, then Prime Minister and future President Mikheil Saakashvili criticised Mamaladze for carrying out a smearing campaign against opposition parties and soliciting Azerbaijani votes by spreading rumours that the new government would organise mass deportations of Georgia's Azerbaijani population. Mamaladze left the country soon after Shevardnadze's resignation in November 2003.

Mikheil Saakashvili's government, which came in power after the 2003 Rose Revolution, took steps towards integrating the country's minorities by attempting to enhance the educational system (see Education).

The new government's efforts to build a professional army changed the military conscription practices and instead allowed many young Azerbaijanis and Armenians from impoverished regions (at least before the Russo-Georgian War of 2008) to be offered real employment opportunities by the Georgian army instead of being dragooned into mandatory military service.

As part of his anti-corruption reforms, in 2004, Saakashvili cracked down on contraband markets. This targeted the economic situation of many Azerbaijanis from the border regions who made a living through unencumbered trade with Azerbaijan and even led to protests against what was seen as "unfair punishment".

In general, the majority-Azerbaijani regions, for the most part, demonstrated satisfaction with the United National Movement (UNM), showing varying support for this party in the 2004, 2008 and 2012 elections. Stephen Jones explains this by the fact that minority-populated electoral districts, in general, showed more irregularities which may indicate that the support for the UNM may have actually been lower than reported. Another explanation may be that, owing to the highly Soviet-like voting culture in this region, the voters did not want to be seen as disloyal or that they had come under the influence of local ethnic elites who have enough power to sway voting practices.

== Social integration ==
Historically, Azerbaijanis in Georgia have succeeded in preserving their ethnic identity and have not been touched by ethnic and/or linguistic assimilation processes observed among many other ethnic communities in the country. Natalia Volkova explained this by the large size of the community and its tendency to being restricted to a specific geographical area. The other reason was that unlike most of their neighbours, Azerbaijanis historically adhered to Islam, which weakened possibilities of intermarriage or any other type of close contact with people of other faiths. Finally, the fact that the Azerbaijani language for a long time enjoyed the status of the language of interethnic communication (see Language) reduced the need of knowing the languages of the neighbours, preventing eventual language shift. Volkova noted that as of 1976, cases of assimilation of Azerbaijanis even in the smallest communities were unheard of.

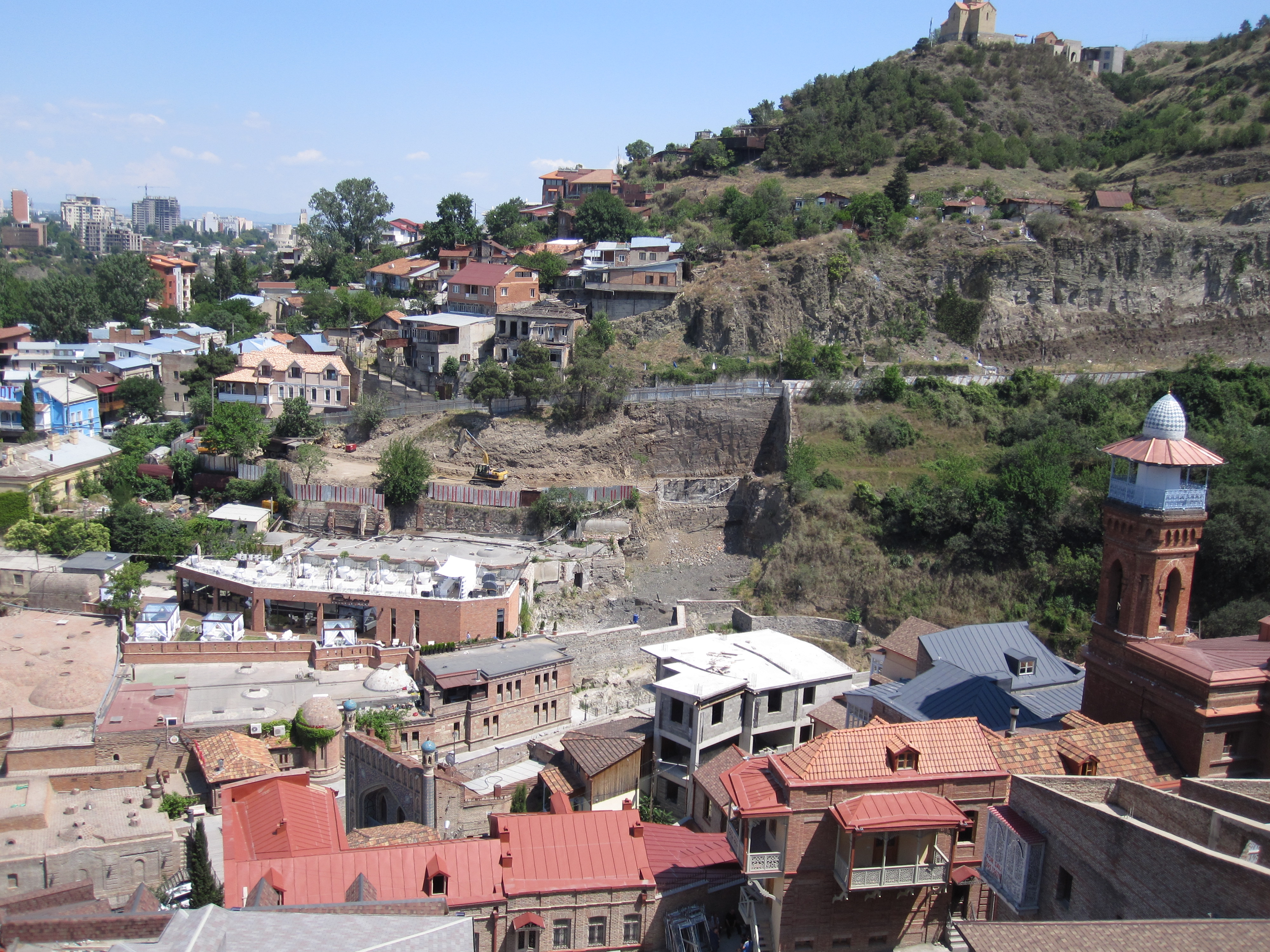
View on the Azerbaijani quarter, Tbilisi

Since Georgia regained its independence in 1991, in addition to nationwide problems such as unemployment, many Azerbaijanis along with other minorities have faced social disintegration and underrepresentation in the country's legislative, executive and judicial powers, mainly due to the language barrier. Emigration and the feeling of alienation decreased in comparison with the early 1990s: according to the 2008 UN Association of Georgia report, 98% of Azerbaijanis surveyed in Kvemo Kartli considered Georgia their homeland, 96% acknowledged that the problems they face are common to citizens countrywide and around 90% linked their futures with Georgia. The percentage of mixed marriages remains one of the lowest in the country. Christian-Muslim intermarriage is much lower than Christian-Christian intermarriage between different ethnic groups: According to 2011 state statistics, there were only 2,229 families in Georgia where one spouse was Georgian and the other one Azerbaijani (compared with 19,325 Georgian–Russian, 15,013 Georgian–Armenian, and 11,501 Georgian–Ossetian marriages).

The language barrier remains a major issue in the integration of the community. Azerbaijanis are not well integrated into Georgian society because many cannot fluently speak the Georgian language. The government has launched various programs and projects in order to help Azerbaijanis integrate into the political life of the country.

== 1992 land reform ==
After the fall of the Communist regime, large areas of state-owned lands could not be maintained by the Georgian government any longer, and a need for their privatisation arose. Champions of the privatisation law believed that private farming would keep agriculture developing further. However, nationalists argued that privatisation of lands populated by ethnic minorities who lived in border regions may lead to irredentist sentiment. In 1992, privatisation law was passed on certain conditions with regard to the border regions, such as the ban on owning land within 21 kilometres from the state border. Large areas of arable land in Gardabani and Marneuli were thus transferred to the control of the Ministry of Defence, and many families ended up owning only 1 to 1.5 hectares of land or less. Although after Mikheil Saakashvili's rise to power in 2004 the ban was lifted, local Azerbaijanis complained of unawareness of the changing laws as the main reason for dissatisfaction and expressed scepticism with regard to the situation improving. As a result, landowners from other parts of the country came to own and rent much of the land (70% according to Azerbaijani non-governmental organisations) that had been formerly in the possession of the Azerbaijani-populated villages and farmer unions. Other problems include corruption of agrarian establishments, land division and distribution, and priority unduly given to large companies, potential voters, and ethnic Georgians. In March 2006, there was an Azerbaijani demonstration held in Marneuli against unfair land privatisation, and several participants were detained.

== Placename reform ==
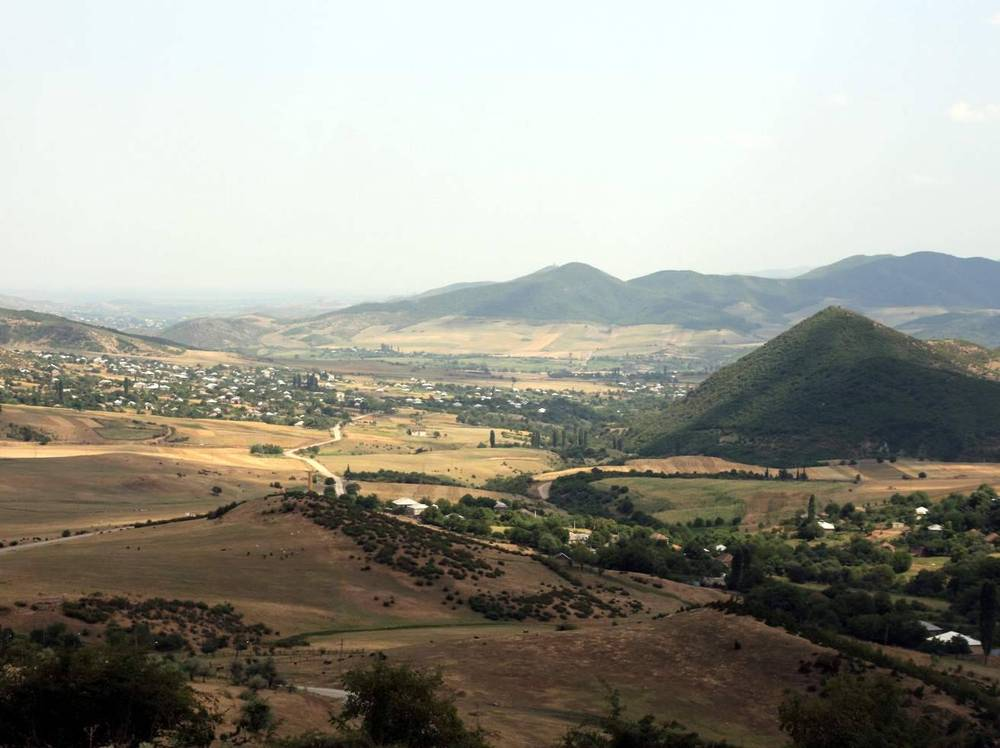
View on the Azerbaijani-populated village of Dzveli-Kveshi near Bolnisi

The Georgianisation of Georgia's toponymy has been a steady process since the 1930s. It affected placenames of Azerbaijani origin, such as Terra Publ. Aghbulagh (Azerbaijani: Ağbulaq) to Tetritsqaro in 1940 (by direct translation), Bashkicheti (Azerbaijani: Başkeçid) to Dmanisi, Karaiazi (Azerbaijani: Qarayazı) to Gardabani, and Sarvan (Azerbaijani: Sarvan) to Marneuli all in 1947. According to the locals, in the 1960s residents of three villages near Gardabani petitioned to Moscow against the plan of renaming their villages, and the names were kept.

During Gamsakhurdia's presidency in the early 1990s, the Azerbaijani-sounding names of 32 villages were changed overnight to Georgian ones by a special decree. Their Azerbaijani population has expressed dissatisfaction with this decision and addressed their concerns in writing to president Mikheil Saakashvili, but the problem has not been resolved. In 2009, the Advisory Committee on the Framework Convention for the Protection of National Minorities qualified the renaming of Azerbaijani-populated villages as a violation of principles of Article 11 of the Framework Convention, to which Georgia is a signatory, and urged the government of Georgia to co-operate with the local ethnic minority to reintroduce the traditional names.

According to the Human Rights Monitoring Group of Ethnic Minorities, on the updated list of place names of the Ministry of Justice Public Registry, Azerbaijani-sounding names of 30 more villages (18 in Marneuli and 12 in Tsalka) were changed to Georgian-sounding ones in 2010–2011.

== Political and social activity ==
Of the four ethnic Azerbaijanis elected in the Georgian National Assembly in the 2016 parliamentary election, three represent the ruling Georgian Dream (Mahir Darziyev, Ruslan Hajiyev, Savalan Mirzayev) and one the previously ruling United National Movement (Azer Suleymanov). There are currently three officially registered large Azerbaijani social organisations, focusing on language instruction, civic education and intercultural communication. However, according to a report by the UN Association of Georgia, Azerbaijani politicians who make it to the national scene often come from Tbilisi and thus maintain weak links with the rural portion of the minority they are supposed to represent.

Ponichala, an Azerbaijani village within Tbilisi, is one of the drug trafficking hubs in Georgia. Despite the population of the village being only 0.5% of the population of the capital as a whole, 17% of drug-related crimes in Tbilisi are committed in Ponichala.

== Culture ==
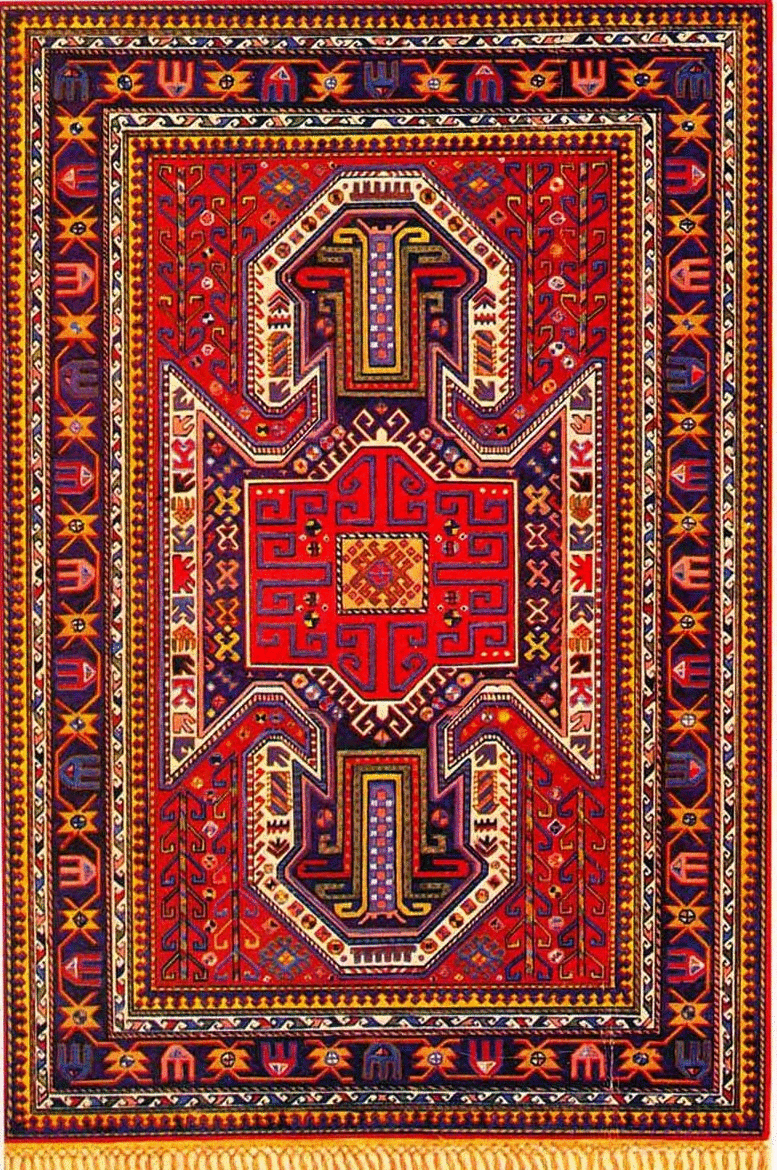
Nineteenth-century Azerbaijani carpet of the Borchali type

The art of ashiks (travelling bards) from the Borchali area has been referred to as the strongest and best-developed Azerbaijani ashik school by Azerbaijani music folklorist Latif Hasanov.

Azerbaijani-populated areas of Georgia, mainly the districts of Marneuli, Bolnisi, Gardabani and Sagarejo, are famous for the production of Azerbaijani rugs of the Gazakh school of carpet-weaving, which also encompasses western Azerbaijan and northern Armenia. The rugs of this school are all wool, coarsely knotted in the symmetrical knot with a long, lustrous pile, and use strong red, blue, and ivory in bold combinations with relatively simple but dramatic designs.

The city of Tbilisi, or Tiflis, is known as one of the important centres for Azerbaijanis' cultural development. Molla Vali Vidadi, an Azerbaijani poet from the eighteenth century, was at one point known as King Erekle II's court poet. Mirza Fatali Akhundov, the Azerbaijani enlightened reformist, novelist and dramatist, the pioneer of the theatrical performance in the East, lived and contributed to literature in Tiflis in the mid-nineteenth century, along with his Ganja-native teacher Mirza Shafi Vazeh. Both died and were buried in Tiflis.

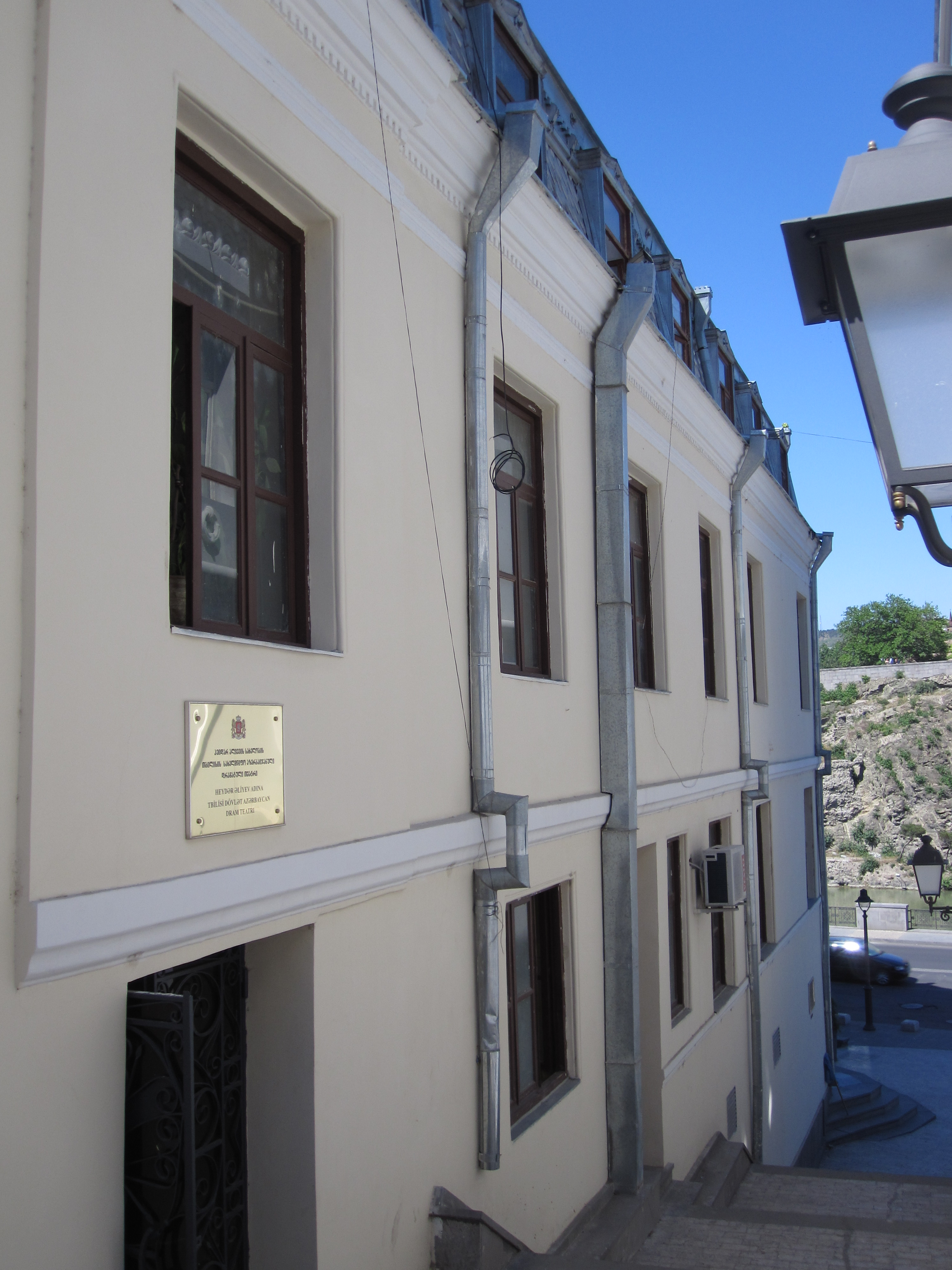
Tbilisi Azerbaijani Drama Theatre

The first printed periodical in history to include articles in Azerbaijani, Tatarskie vedomosti, was published in Tiflis in 1832. The famous Azerbaijani satirical magazine Molla Nasraddin edited by Jalil Mammadguluzadeh was published in Tiflis in 1906–1917, as were Azerbaijani newspapers from earlier periods (such as Ziya, Keshkul and Sharg-i rus in the nineteenth and early twentieth century). The Transcaucasian Teachers Seminary which trained professional teachers for secular primary Azerbaijani schools was located in Gori. Folk singer Bulbuljan, among others, spent 30 years of his life living and performing in Tiflis. Tiflis was also the hometown and academic locale for some of the most prominent Azerbaijani singers, such as Rashid Behbudov and the first Azerbaijani female opera singer Shovkat Mammadova, as well as to the first professional Azerbaijani female painter Geysar Kashiyeva, and the first female pianist Khadija Gayibova.

Plays by Azerbaijani writers were staged in Tbilisi already in 1872. Today Azerbaijani-language plays are staged at the Tbilisi State Azerbaijani Drama Theatre, established in 1922. In addition, the Museum of Azerbaijani Culture in Tbilisi, located in the former house of Mirza Fatali Akhundov, is one of several such centres in the country and consists of a museum, a library, a cafe, an art gallery and a wine cellar. The Azerbaijani Cultural Centre in Marneuli works closely with the Heydar Aliyev Foundation and the State Committee on Work with Diaspora of Azerbaijan, issues the magazines Garapapagh and Meydan and manages its own folk dance ensemble Sarvan. There are 15 public libraries with materials available mainly in the Azerbaijani language across the country. There also exists an Azerbaijani cultural centre in Bolnisi. Three Georgian state newspapers, one in Tbilisi and two in Marneuli, are printed in Azerbaijani, and a newspaper printed in Bolnisi contains a section in Azerbaijani. Five-minute newscasts in Azerbaijani are aired on Georgia's Public Radio on weekdays. In March 2015, a new radio station, AGFM, was launched to broadcast in Azerbaijani on a 24-hour basis. It covers the regions of Tbilisi, Rustavi, Gardabani, Marneuli, Bolnisi, Dmanisi, and Tetritsqaro. Television programs in the Azerbaijani language are broadcast by some regional channels.

Beginning in 2009, Azerbaijanis of Dmanisi have annually held Elat, a summer celebration that historically marked the seasonal migration of Borchali pastoralists from plains into the mountains. The event is attended by tourists from other Azerbaijani-populated parts of Georgia.

On 21 March 2010, Mikheil Saakashvili declared Nowruz, an ancient Near Eastern spring fest celebrated by Azerbaijanis, a national holiday in Georgia.

== Language ==
Most Azerbaijanis in Georgia speak Azerbaijani as a first language. Azerbaijanis of Tbilisi are mainly bilingual or trilingual, speaking Georgian and Russian in addition to their native language. On the other hand, Azerbaijanis living in almost monoethnic villages in Kvemo Kartli, who constitute the core of Georgia's Azerbaijani population, largely speak little to no Georgian. To Azerbaijanis in Georgia, secondary education is available in their native language, which is a remnant Soviet policy. As of 2015, Azerbaijani serves as the language of instruction in 120 schools in Tbilisi, Kvemo Kartli and Kakheti, a number which went down from 183 as of 1989. Young Azerbaijanis in Georgia who choose to continue their education often apply to universities in Azerbaijan and thus limit their career prospects in their home country. According to the 2014 census, only 43,579 (18.7%) out of 231,436 Azerbaijanis in Georgia reported being able to speak Georgian fluently, which is nevertheless more than the 1970 (6%) and the 2002 (15%) figure. As of 2002, Russian was the most popular second language for Azerbaijanis, with 75,207 speakers (26%; up from 17% in 1970). At the same time, 934 Azerbaijanis indicated Georgian and 385 indicated Russian as their first language.

Up until the early twentieth century, Azerbaijani was the language of interethnic communication across most of the South Caucasus and the surrounding regions, including much of Georgia, with the exception of the Black Sea coastal regions. This mainly had to do with the economic practices of the neighbouring (mainly male) population, such as seasonal work, distant pastoralism, and trade. Up until the 1930s, large groups of ethnic Georgian, Armenian, Ossetian and Greek male population of Tetritsqaro would regularly visit the mainly-Azerbaijani populated region of Marneuli for seasonal work as railway workers, miners, guards, and shepherds and used Azerbaijani to communicate with the local population. In the nineteenth century, Georgians of Kakheti and Tusheti, as well as Kists from the Pankisi Gorge would herd their sheep down to the pastures in the Azerbaijani-populated lowlands, where they would spend the winter, which also contributed to their knowledge of Azerbaijani. Some Tush Georgians would give their children up for fosterage (a common practice among peoples of the Caucasus aimed at strengthening intercommunal relations) to Azerbaijani families for the duration of their stay on the winter pastures. In addition, tinsmiths and, less often, shepherds from Dagestan who visited Georgia around the same time would also use Azerbaijani to communicate with the local population.

Later, due to changing linguistic policies, universal schooling, and abandonment of older practices, Azerbaijani significantly lost positions to Georgian and Russian. Volkova noted that as of 1976, Azerbaijani was still used as the language of trade between representatives of different ethnic groups in Tetritsqaro, Dmanisi and Marneuli. In 2002, 218 non-Azerbaijanis in Georgia indicated Azerbaijani as their first language and 6,704 more claimed speaking it as a second language. The Soviet census recorded Turkish-speaking Urum Greeks of central Georgia as speaking Azerbaijani as a first language, in part due to the fact that their original dialect underwent influence from Azerbaijani over the centuries and shifted towards the latter.

== Education ==
The first European-style school in Georgia with Azerbaijani as the language of instruction opened in Tiflis in 1847, followed by the Kizilajlo school in 1877. Before the establishment of Soviet power in 1921 and the introduction of compulsory universal education, there had already been 24 such schools across the country.

There was not much incentive for Azerbaijanis to learn Georgian in Soviet times. Those who chose to pursue post-secondary education in Georgia did so in universities with Russian as the language of instruction, where Georgian was not even offered as a second language course. Since the fall of the Soviet Union, lack of knowledge of the official language makes it harder for Azerbaijanis and other ethnic minorities to be active in many social areas. Such isolation is furthered by the fact that many rural Azerbaijanis prefer to read newspapers published in Azerbaijani and set up satellite dishes in order to be able to watch channels of neighbouring Azerbaijan or establish their own community television channels (such as Ellada TV, which functioned in Gardabani in 1995–1999).

Teachers and principals of schools where Azerbaijani is the language of instruction report problems with the quality of the printed materials, their deficit and the physical condition of rural Azerbaijani-language schools.

The Saakashvili government's educational policy attempted to provide students in majority-Armenian and Azerbaijani areas with improved learning materials and teachers willing to instruct non-native speakers of Georgian. As of 2013, however, the program did not prove very efficient. The standards of the general ability exams considered mandatory and non-mandatory were altered in order to accommodate non-Georgians (for example, the exam on Georgian literature became optional) and a program funding minority group students wanting to study in the United States was introduced. On the other hand, the Law on Civil Service (adopted in 1998, but previously applied selectively) which stipulates that all work be carried out in Georgian, was enforced and, in effect, barred many Armenians and Azerbaijanis who had been schooled in their native languages not only from working in the civil service but even accessing it due to insufficient knowledge of Georgian.

== Religion ==
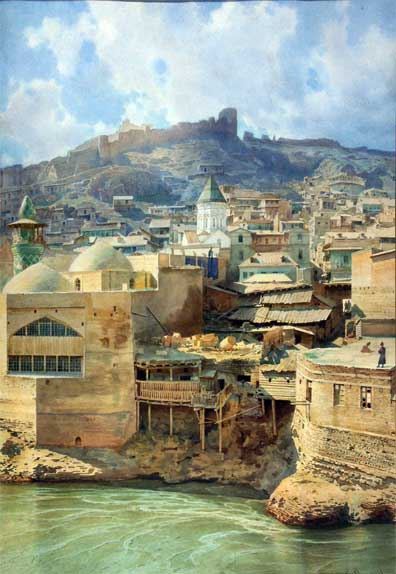
Shah Ismayil Mosque (left) in Luigi Premazzi's painting of old Tbilisi

Azerbaijanis in Georgia are mainly Muslim, with 80% being Shia and 20% Sunni, a distinction that is not felt much due to religion not occupying an important part of their everyday lives. Georgia's constitution provides for religious freedom, and Azerbaijanis have the opportunity to attend mosques in the country. The largest Shiite mosque in Tbilisi was built in 1524 by Ismail I of Iran. In 1951, during the construction of the Metekhi bridge the communist government ordered the mosque to be demolished. The Sunni mosque was built between 1723 and 1735 by the Ottomans, but it was destroyed in 1740 by reinvading Persians. In 1864, it was restored and headed by the Teregulovs, a family of Volga Tatar origin who had settled in Tbilisi two decades prior to that. Since the demolition of the Shiite mosque in 1951, the Shiite Azerbaijanis of Tbilisi have attended the Sunni mosque (the only Muslim temple in modern Tbilisi), where the Sunni and Shiite sections were separated by a black curtain. In 1996, the new imam ordered to remove the curtain and both denominations have prayed together ever since.

Although able to preserve their linguistic and religious identity, the Azerbaijanis in Georgia have undergone some influences from Georgian culture, such as mourning over the body of the deceased for three days, while Azerbaijanis elsewhere, like most Muslims, generally bury their dead on the day of death before sunset.

== Demographics ==
In 2014, Azerbaijanis constituted a majority or a significant (over 10%) minority in the towns and villages across the following municipalities: 58 in Marneuli, 43 in Dmanisi, 37 in Bolnisi, 17 in Gardabani, 11 in Sagarejo, 9 in Lagodekhi, 8 in Kaspi, 8 in Tsalka, 7 in Tetritsqaro, 4 in Mtskheta, 3 in Gori, 2 in Dedoplistsqaro, 1 in Akhmeta, 1 in Kareli, and 1 in Telavi. Ethnic Azerbaijani villages are also among the largest in the country in terms of population.

=== Distribution ===
Only municipalities with 1,000 or more Azerbaijanis are listed below. The information is based on official figures from the 2014 population census.

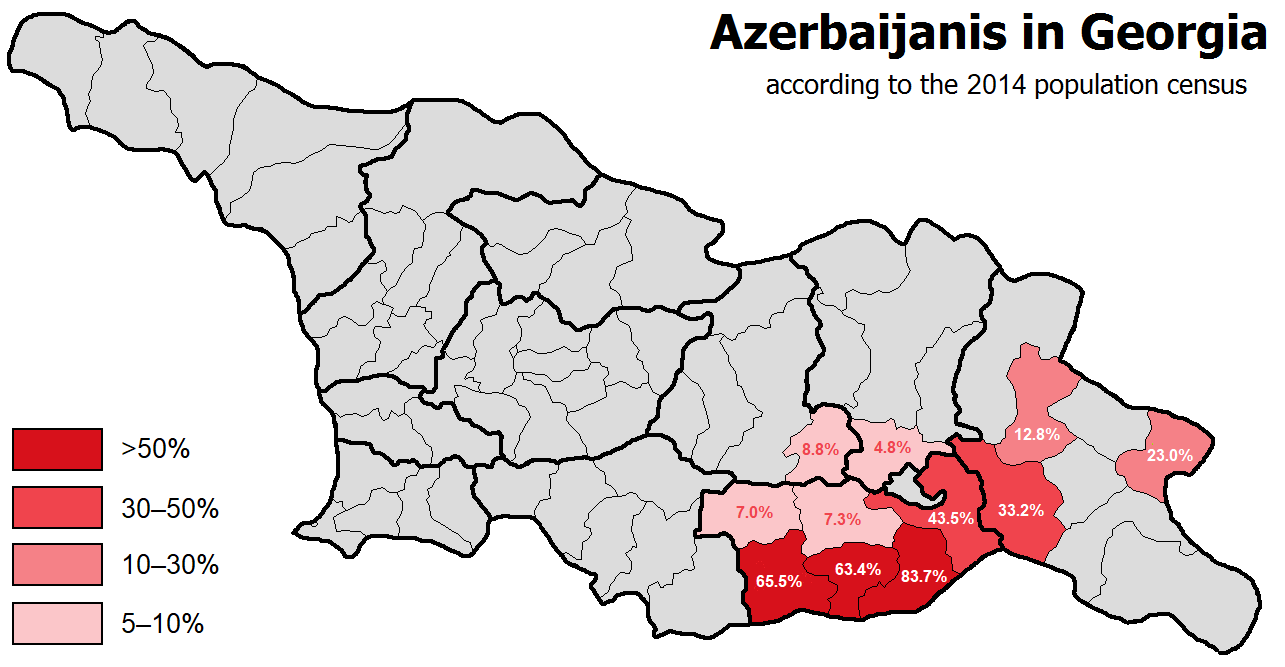
Azerbaijanis in Georgia by municipalities, 2014

Region	Region's Azerbaijani population	% of region's entire population
Tbilisi (capital)	15,187	1.4
Kvemo Kartli	177,032	41.8
• Marneuli	87,371	83.7
• Gardabani	35,642	43.5
• Bolnisi	33,964	63.4
• Dmanisi	12,530	65.5
• Rustavi	4,661	3.7
• Tetritsqaro	1,548	7.3
• Tsalka	1,316	7.0
Kakheti	32,354	10.2
• Sagarejo	17,164	33.2
• Lagodekhi	9,601	23.0
• Telavi	4,945	12.8
Shida Kartli	5,501	2.1
• Kaspi	3,846	8.8
• Kareli	1,124	2.7
Mtskheta-Mtianeti	2,316	2.4
• Mtskheta	2,301	4.8
Total in Georgia	233,024	6.3

=== Change in population ===
The number of Azerbaijanis rose faster than that of most other ethnicities in Georgia during the twentieth century. The information below is based on official figures from the population censūs of 1926, 1939, 1959, 1970, 1979, 1989, 2002 and 2014.

Year	Georgia's Azerbaijani population	% of Georgia's entire population
1926 ^{1}	137,921	5.2
1939 ^{2}	▲188,058	▲5.3
1959	▼153,600	▼3.8
1970	▲217,758	▲4.6
1979	▲255,678	▲5.1
1989	▲307,556	▲5.7
2002	▼284,761	▲6.5
2014	▼233,024	▼6.3

^{1} The number includes Meskhetian Turks. Excluding the population of the Akhaltsikhe and Akhalkalaki uyezds recorded as 'Azerbaijani', the Azerbaijani population would number 81,811 persons, or 3.05% of the country's overall population.

^{2} The number includes Meskhetian Turks. Excluding the population of the regions of Aspindza, Adigeni, Akhaltsikhe and Akhalkalaki recorded as 'Azerbaijani', the Azerbaijani population would number 101,080 persons, or 2.85% of the country's overall population.

== See also ==
- Azerbaijan–Georgia relations
- List of Azerbaijanis
- Demographics of Georgia
