= S4 highway (Georgia) =

Trunk road in Georgia

S4
- საერთაშორისო 4
- Tbilisi–Red Bridge

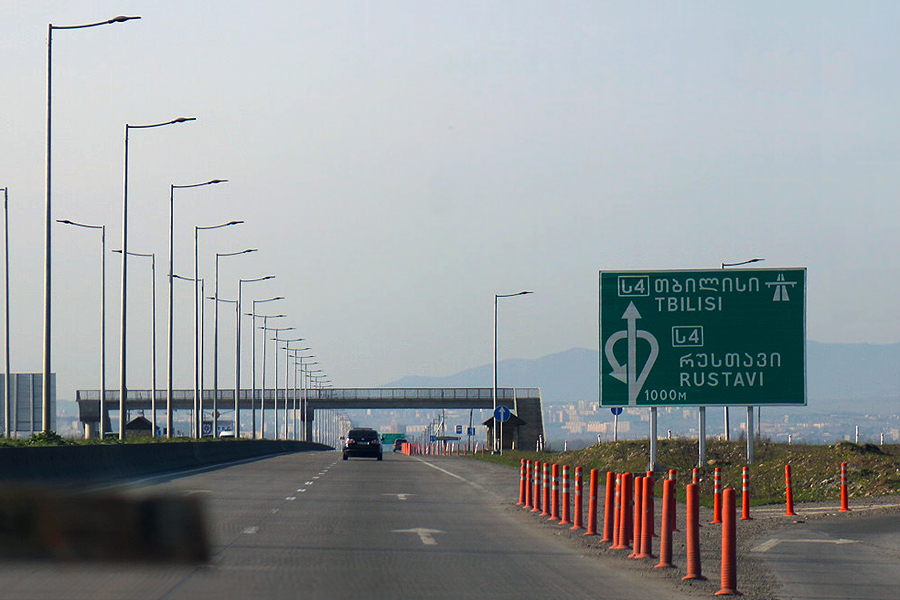
- S4 highway Rustavi - Tbilisi

Route information
- Part of
- Length: 57 km (35 mi)
- Existed: 1996–present

Major junctions
- North end: Tbilisi
- (km) 8 to Sadakhlo (Armenia) 18 20 Rustavi 45 Sh163 to Algeti / Marneuli 57 Sh161 to Shulaveri
- South end: Red Bridge (Azerbaijan border)

Location
- Georgia
- Municipalities: Tbilisi, Gardabani, Rustavi, Marneuli

Highway system
- Roads in Georgia; International Routes; National Routes

The Georgian S4 route (Georgian: საერთაშორისო მნიშვნელობის გზა ს4, Saertashoriso mnishvnelobis gza S4, road of international importance), also known as Tbilisi–Red Bridge (Azerbaijan border) or Rustavi Highway, is a "road of international importance" within the Georgian road network and runs from Tbilisi via Rustavi city to the border with Azerbaijan at the Red Bridge over a distance of 57 kilometres (35 mi). After crossing the Georgian-Azerbaijan border the highway continues as M2 to Ganja and Baku.

The S4 highway is part of the European E60 and Asian AH5 between the S9 Tbilisi Bypass and Red Bridge. Furthermore, it is part of the European E117 in Tbilisi until the S6 highway junction, while it is part of the Asian AH81 between the S6 and S9 junctions. The highway is mostly located in the southern Kvemo Kartli region. Within the Tbilisi capital region the S4 is a mix of city thoroughfare and expressway of 2x3 lanes. Between Ponitchala and Rustavi the road has been upgraded to a 2x2 motorway while the remainder to the Azerbaijan border is a two lane road. International funds have been raised to upgrade the latter part of the S4 south of Rustavi to a 2x2 motorway and realign the route.

== Background ==
With the Soviet introduction in the early 1980s of the M-roads the current S4 route became entirely part of the M27 highway route that ran from Novorossiysk via Tbilisi to Baku. The Russian part of that M27 existed until 2018 when it got renumbered as A147 highway. Prior to the 1980s the route of today's S4 was unnumbered as was the case with most Soviet roads.

After Georgia regained independence in 1991, the M27 designation was maintained until 1996 when the current route numbering system was adopted. In that year the "roads of international importance" (S-)category was introduced and the "S4 Tbilisi–Red Bridge (Azerbaijan border)" replaced the M27 designation.

The S4 is the most popular route to travel between Tbilisi and Baku, and on both sides of the border the roads are being or going to be upgraded to motorway standards. The S4 has been included in the ambitious Georgian East-West Highway project, which aims to create a 455 kilometres (283 mi) east-west transport corridor through Georgia connecting Azerbaijan, Armenia and Turkey. Within this project Georgian sections of the E60 (Poti-Tbilisi-Red Bridge, Azerbaijan) and E70 (Poti-Batumi-Sarpi, Turkey) highways are upgraded and integrated to strengthen Georgia's position as South Caucasus transport hub. The East-West Highway project includes redesign of major sections of the Georgian S1, S2, S4, S12 and more recently the S7 highway, to grade-separated highways, mostly as 2x2 expressway.

== Future ==
Redesign S4 and S7 highways

In 2021 the European Investment Bank provided an additional €106.7 million to Georgia for major upgrades to its East-West Highway. These additional funds are dedicated for a realign and upgrade project involving the S4 and S7 highways. The S4 highway will be rerouted between Rustavi and the Red Bridge border crossing to Azerbaijan and will be constructed as 2x2 motorway. Halfway this section a new 2x2 motorway will be constructed in southwestern direction towards the current S7 at Kvemo Sarali village. From here the southern 16 kilometres (9.9 mi) of the S7 to Sadakhlo and the Armenian border will be realigned and rebuild as 2x2 motorway. The redesign of the southern part of the S4 highway has been on the agenda for quite some years. Even though extra financing has been found, it is unknown when construction will commence.

== Route ==
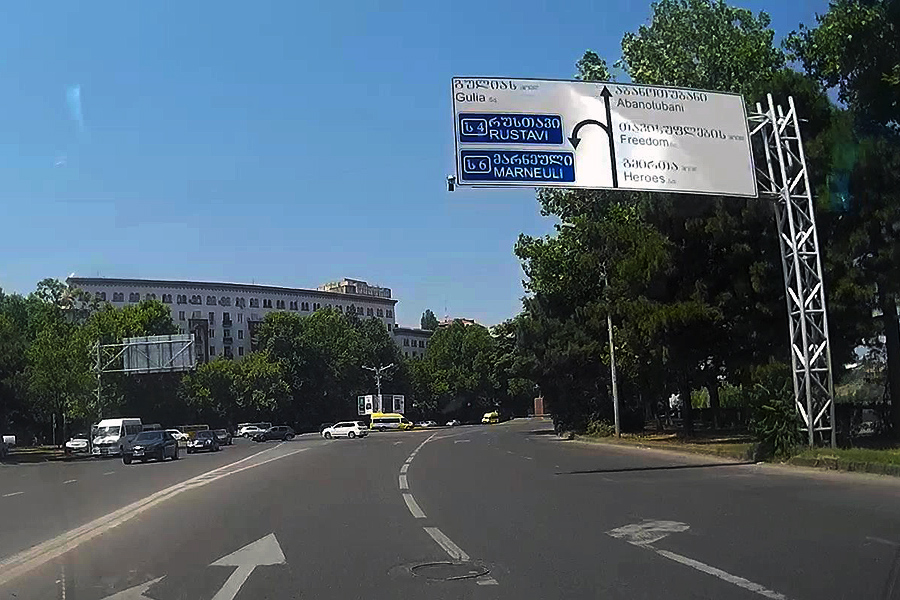
North terminus S4 in Tbilisi

The reference point for the mileage of roads leaving Tbilisi, such as the S4 highway, is Freedom Square according to the Georgian "Law on motor roads". But that does not mean Freedom Square is the actual starting point of the highway. In the case of the S4 the actual starting point is Dimitry Gulia street near the Ortachala Hydropower Plant, about 3 kilometres (1.9 mi) from Freedom Square. The speed limit on the motorway section is 90 km/h (56 mph) while it is 70 km/h (43 mph) on the two lane highway section, with the exception of passage through towns and villages (60 km/h (37 mph), may vary locally) and within the Tbilisi city.

Beginning as a 6 lane city road, once the Mtkvari/Kura river bank is reached the S4 turns into a 2x3 lane express road with a speed limit of 70 km/h (43 mph). At the entrance of the Ponitchala city district the S6 highway to Marneuli and Yerevan branches off. A new grade separated express road bypass for Ponitchala is under construction, but till then traffic goes through the densely populated district as a two lane road. The S4 turns into a 2x2 lane motorway in the southern part of Ponitchala, and remains that until Rustavi, which is at this point just 9 kilometres (5.6 mi) away. Just before Rustavi the S9 Tbilisi Bypass joins the S4. After the Rustavi exit the S4 highway turns into a two lane road and remains that way until its terminus at the Azerbaijan border.

At the south side of Rustavi the highway climbs the plateau rising above the city. The future S4 motorway route will shortcut the curves here bypassing the highest point in the current route. The S4 continues from here in a straight southeasterly course to the border with Azerbaijan through an arid-steppe landscape. The border crossing is named "Red Bridge" (Tsiteli Khidi in Georgian) after the old red-brick bridge arch bridge across the Khrami River between the Georgian and Azerbaijani border posts.

== Intersections ==
Region	Municipality	km	mi		Destinations	Route	Notes
City of Tbilisi		3	1.9			E117	North end E117 overlap
City of Tbilisi		6	3.7	Exit			
City of Tbilisi		9	5.6	Right junction	Marneuli / Yerevan ( (Armenia) )	ს 6 ( E117 / AH81)	South end E117 overlap, North end AH81 overlap
City of Tbilisi		12	7.5	Motorway			Motorway section (2x2)
City of Tbilisi		13	8.1	Tbilisi city limits			
Kvemo Kartli	Gardabani	13.2	8.2	Exit			
Kvemo Kartli	Gardabani	17	11	Exit			
Kvemo Kartli	Rustavi	19	12	Interchange	Poti / Batumi	ს 9 ( E60 / AH5 / AH81)	South end AH81 overlap, North end E60 and AH5 overlap
Kvemo Kartli	Rustavi	21	13	Exit	Rustavi		
Kvemo Kartli	Rustavi	21.5	13.4	End of Motorway			Continues south as two lane highway.
Kvemo Kartli	Marneuli	50	31	Crosses Algeti River (95m)			
Kvemo Kartli	Marneuli	51	32	Right junction	Meore Kesalo	შ 164	
Kvemo Kartli	Marneuli	57	35	Crosses Khrami River			
Kvemo Kartli	Marneuli	57	35	Right junction	Sadakhlo / Armenia	შ 161	
Kvemo Kartli	Marneuli	57	35	(Azerbaijan) Red Bridge border checkpoint. Road continues as M2 to Baku ( E60 / AH5). South end E60/AH5 overlap			
1.000 mi = 1.609 km; 1.000 km = 0.621 mi: Concurrency terminus
