= Tamarisi =

Tamarisi თამარისი
- Interactive map of Tamarisi
- Location in Georgia Tamarisi (Kvemo Kartli)
- Coordinates: 41°28′26″N 44°43′07″E
- Country: Georgia
- Mkhare: Kvemo Kartli
- Municipality: Bolnisi
- Daba: 1982
- Elevation: 430 m (1,410 ft)

Population (2021)
  - Total: 697
- Climate: Cfa

Tamarisi is a daba (Urban-type settlement) in southern Georgia with almost 700 residents (2021[1]), located in Bolnisi Municipality (Kvemo Kartli region). Tamarisi is located 7 kilometers west of the city of Marneuli, on the Georgian S6 highway (E117). Five kilometers to the south is the larger village of Tamarisi, which belongs to the municipality of Marneuli, with which it should not be confused.

== Background ==
Tamarisi is located between the villages of Parizi and Tsurtavi and was established in 1982 with the establishment of a large poultry factory, on the south side of the S6 highway, to house its labourforce. It immediately acquired the status of an urban-type settlement (daba) when it was founded. A decree of the Presidium of the Supreme Council of the Georgian SSR decided to do so on March 30, 1982, which also assigned the name Tamarisi. (Note: "The Presidium of the Supreme Council of the Georgian SSR, by decree of March 30, 1982, classified the newly formed settlement in the Bolnisi rajon as an urban-type settlement with the assignment of the name Tamarisi.")

Tamarisi is administratively the center and namesake of the Tamarisi community (temi, თემი) within the Bolnisi Municipality, which also includes the (neighboring) villages of Parizi and Tsurtavi. The town is located at the foot of the Kvemo Kartli Plateau that rises about 150 m (490 ft) above the village. This plateau, from which the Khrami River flows through a gorge, turns here into the Kvemo Kartli Plain. Next to the Tamarisi Poultry Factory is the 18th century Kolagiri fortress.

== Population ==
At the beginning of 2021, Tamarisi had a population of 697, an increase of almost 19% compared to the 2014 census. The population of Tamarisi was made up in 2014 of a majority of Georgians (56.3%), followed by Azerbaijanis (38.6%) and Armenians (3.1%).

1979	1989	2002	2014	2021
-	707	▼434	▲510	▲697
Data: Population statistics Georgia 1897 to present. Note: (Note: The 2014 census found an inexplicable gap with the data from the national statistical office Geostat. UN-assisted research has found the 2002 census was inflated by about 8-9 percent. See, "1. Introduction", Page 1.)

== See also ==
- Kolagiri fortress
- Bolnisi Municipality
- Kvemo Kartli
