= S7 highway (Georgia) =

Trunk road in Georgia

S7
- საერთაშორისო 7
- Marneuli–Sadakhlo

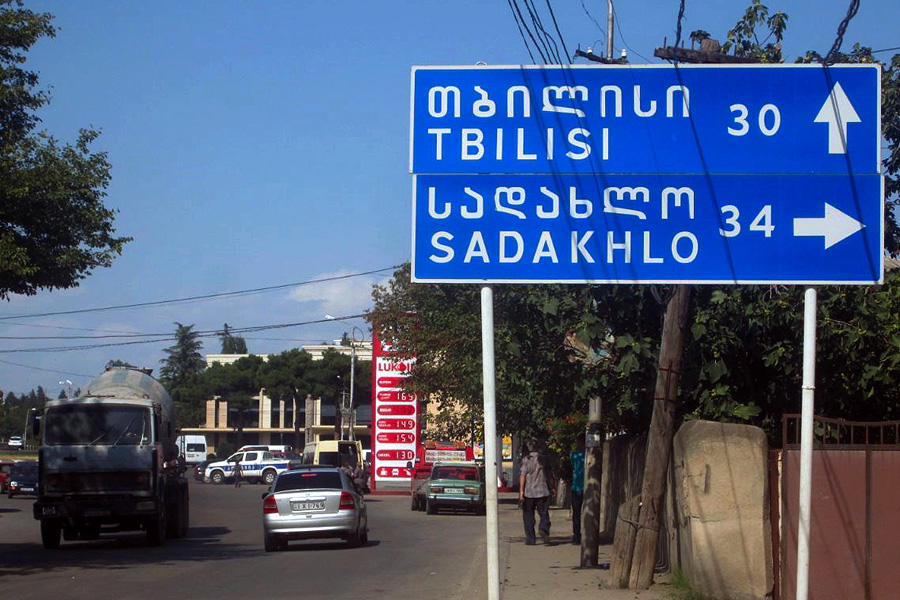
- S7 to Sadakhlo starts in Marneuli

Route information
- Part of
- Length: 34 km (21 mi)

Major junctions
- North end: Marneuli
- (km) 15 Sh161 to Red Bridge (Azerbaijan) 30 Sh37 to Akhkerpi (Armenia)
- South end: Armenian border (Sadakhlo) (Armenia)

Location
- Georgia
- Municipalities: Marneuli

Highway system
- Roads in Georgia; International Routes; National Routes

The Georgian S7 route (Georgian: საერთაშორისო მნიშვნელობის გზა ს7, Saertashoriso mnishvnelobis gza S7, road of international importance), also known as Marneuli–Sadakhlo (Armenian border), is a "road of international importance" within the Georgian road network and runs from Marneuli to the border with Armenia near Sadakhlo over a distance of 34 kilometres (21 mi), making it the shortest S-highway in Georgia. After crossing the Georgian-Armenian border the highway continues as M6 to Vanadzor, Armenia's third largest city.

The S7 highway is entirely part of European route E001 and the Asian Highway AH81 and connects with the Georgian S6 highway in Marneuli. Furthermore, the road is entirely located in Marneuli Municipality (Kvemo Kartli region) and built as a two lane road. Plans have been developed and international funds have been raised to upgrade the southern part of the S7 to a 2x2 motorway, while a new motorway section will connect the S7 with a redesigned S4 highway near Didi Mughanlo.

== Background ==
From the early 1980s the current S7 route was referred to as A310 within the Soviet road network which extended into the Armenian SSR. At its Marneuli terminus the A310 connected with the A304 highway (now Georgian S6 highway). Prior to the 1980s the route was unnumbered as was the case with most Soviet roads. When Georgia's road numbering system was revised in 1996 the "roads of international importance" (S-)category was introduced and the "S7 Marneuli–Sadakhlo (Armenian border)" replaced the A310 designation.

The S7 is the most popular route to travel between Tbilisi and Yerevan, offering alternative routes within Armenia. The S7 has been included in the ambitious Georgian East-West Highway project, which aims to create a 455 kilometres (283 mi) east-west transport corridor through Georgia connecting Azerbaijan, Armenia and Turkey. Within this project Georgian sections of the E60 (Poti-Tbilisi-Red Bridge, Azerbaijan) and E70 (Poti-Batumi-Sarpi, Turkey) highways are upgraded and integrated to strengthen Georgia's position as South Caucasus transport hub. The East-West Highway project includes redesign of major sections of the Georgian S1, S2, S4, S12 and more recently the S7 highway, to grade-separated highways, mostly as 2x2 expressway.

== Future ==
Redesign S4 and S7 highways

In 2021 the European Investment Bank provided an additional €106.7 million to Georgia for major upgrades of its East-West Highway. These additional funds are dedicated for a realign and upgrade project involving the S7 and S4 highways. The S4 highway will be rerouted between Rustavi and the Red Bridge border crossing to Azerbaijan and constructed as 2x2 motorway. Halfway this section a new 2x2 motorway will be constructed in southwestern direction towards the current S7 at Kvemo Sarali village. From here the southern 16 kilometres (9.9 mi) of the S7 to Sadakhlo and the Armenian border will be realigned and rebuild as 2x2 motorway.

Although the S7 is not part of the European E60 or E70 routes, it was included in recent years within the East-West Highway project. The need to bypass Marneuli due to the increasing Armenia bound traffic and the pending realignment of the southern section of the S4 (which was envisioned within the original scope) made this a logical step.

== Route ==
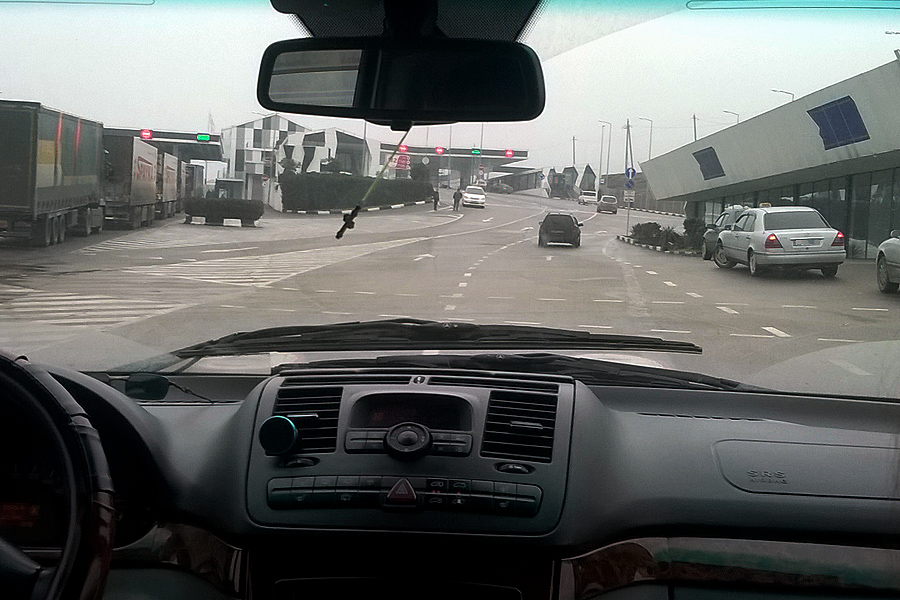
South terminus S7: Sadakhlo border checkpoint

The S7 highway is the shortest S-route in Georgia and begins in Marneuli at the central roundabout junction, where it branches of the S6 highway). Heading south leaving town it crosses the now defunct Marneuli-Bolnisi-Kazreti railway line. The S7 runs parallel to the Tbilisi-Yerevan railway line (which opened in 1899) to the Sadakhlo border crossing through the Marneuli Plains, passing a string of villages along the way. In Shulaveri state route Sh161 provides a shortcut to the Red Bridge border crossing with Azerbaijan and the S4 highway. More than 80% of the population of Marneuli Municipality is of Azeri ethnicity. In the town of Sadakhlo, just a few kilometers from the Armenian border state route Sh37 leads to the small and fourth Georgian-Armenian border crossing in Akhkerpi.

== Intersections ==
The route is located in Marneuli Municipality (Kvemo Kartli region) and overlaps entirely with E001 and AH81 routes.

Municipality	km	mi		Destinations	Route	Notes
Marneuli	0	0.0	Roundabout	Algeti Tbilisi Tsalka Bolnisi / Guguti	S6 highway (Georgia) European route E117 AH81 Roads in Georgia (country)	Highway to border Armenia
Marneuli	1	0.62	Crosses Marneuli-Bolnisi-Kazreti railway line (defunct)			
Marneuli	1.5	0.93	Marneuli town limits			
Marneuli	7	4.3	Left junction	Saimerlo		(formerly Orjonikidze)
Marneuli	10	6.2	Crosses Khrami River			
Marneuli	14	8.7	Crossing	Shaumiani Kulari		
Marneuli	15	9.3	Left junction	Tsiteli Khidi (Red Bridge)		Road to border Azerbaijan
Marneuli	29	18	Crosses Banovcha river (70m)			
Marneuli	30	19	Right junction	Akhkerpi	Roads in Georgia (country)	Road to border Armenia
Marneuli	34	21	(Armenia) Armenian border checkpoint. Road continues as to Vanadzor			
1.000 mi = 1.609 km; 1.000 km = 0.621 mi
