= AH81 =

Road in Asia

Asian Highway 81 (AH81) is a road in the Asian Highway Network running 1143 km (714 miles) from Larsi, Georgia to Baku, Azerbaijan, with ferry connection to Aktau, Kazakhstan. The route is as follows:

== Georgia ==
- S3 Highway: Larsi - Natakhtari
- S1 Highway: Natakhtari - Mtskheta
- S9 Highway: Mtskheta - Tbilisi - Rustavi
- S4 Highway: Rustavi - Tbilisi
- S6 Highway: Tbilisi - Marneuli
- S7 Highway: Marneuli - Sadakhlo

== Armenia ==
- : Dzoramut - Vanadzor - Ashtarak
- : Ashtarak - Yerevan
- : Yerevan - Yereskh

== Azerbaijan ==
- R63 Road: Sadarak
- M7 Highway: Sədərək - Nakhchivan - Igdir Turkey, State road D.080 (Turkey)
- M8 Highway: Nakhchivan - Julfa - Ordubad - Kilit
  - Branch R65 Road: Julfa - Jolfa (Iran, Road 21)

== Armenia ==
- M-2 Highway: Agarak - Meghri
- M-17 Highway: Meghri - Nrnadzor
- H-49 Road: Nrnadzor - Aghband

== Azerbaijan ==
- M6 Highway: Aghband - Mərcanlı - Goradiz - Hajiqabul
- M2 Highway: Hajiqabul - Ələt - Baku

== Kazakhstan ==
=== Post 2024 road numbering scheme ===
- : Baku - Aktau port
- KAZ11 : Aktau port – Aktau – Kuryk

=== 2011-2024 road numbering scheme ===
- : Baku - Aktau port
- A-35 : Aktau port – Aktau – Kuryk
