= S6 highway (Georgia) =

Trunk road in Georgia

S6
- საერთაშორისო 6
- Ponichala–Marneuli–Guguti

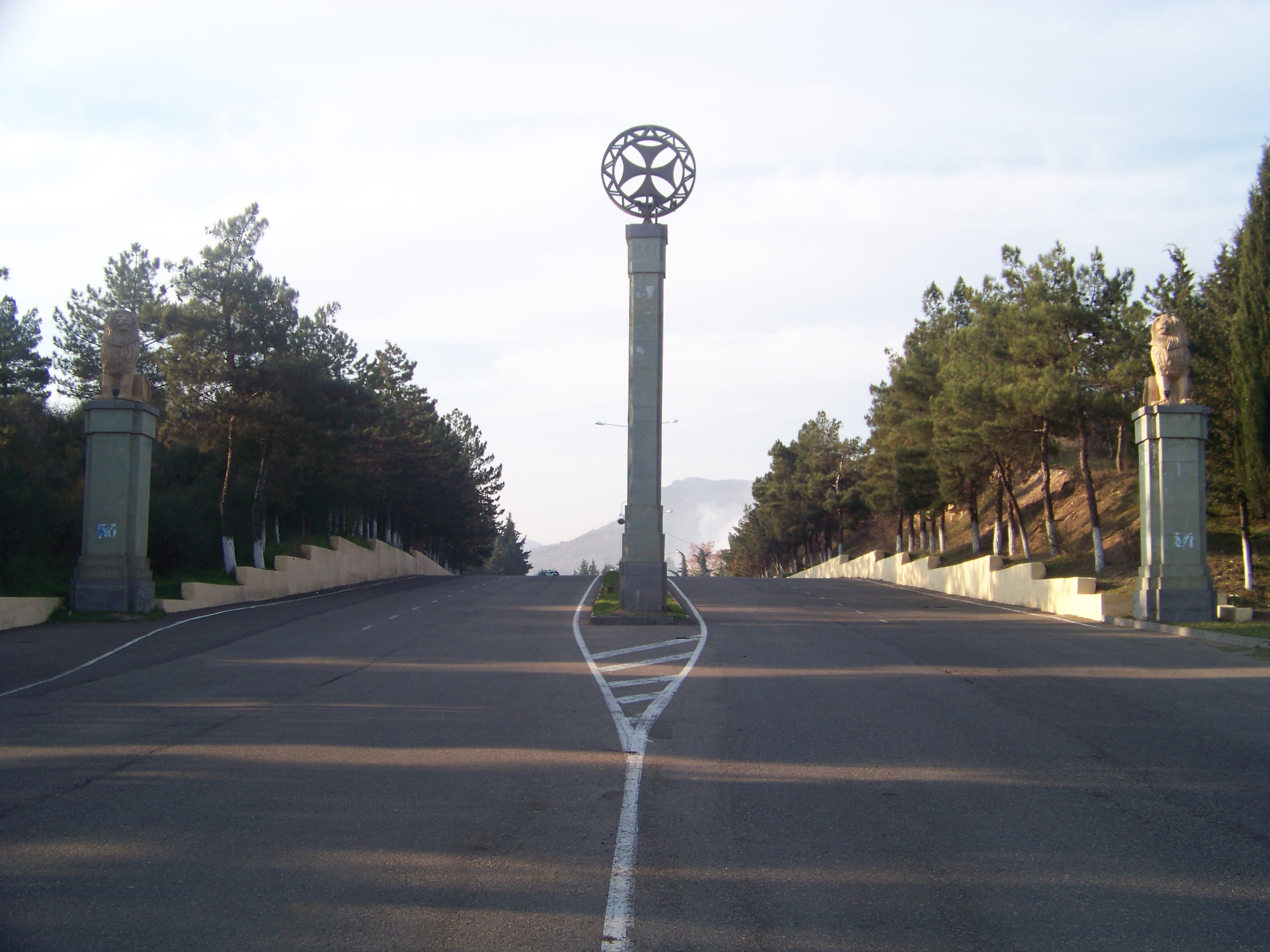
- S6 near Bolnisi

Route information
- Part of
- Length: 98 km (61 mi)

Major junctions
- North end: Ponichala (Tbilisi)
- (km) 18 Sh31 to Tsalka 28 Sh33 to Tsalka S7 to Sadakhlo (Armenia) Sh163 to Algeti 74 Sh68 to Dmanisi
- South end: Armenian border (Guguti) (Armenia)

Location
- Georgia
- Municipalities: Tbilisi, Gardabani, Tetritskaro, Marneuli, Bolnisi, Dmanisi

Highway system
- Roads in Georgia; International Routes; National Routes

The Georgian S6 route (Georgian: საერთაშორისო მნიშვნელობის გზა ს6, Saertashoriso mnishvnelobis gza S6, road of international importance), also known as Ponichala–Marneuli–Guguti (Armenian border), is a "road of international importance" within the Georgian road network and runs from Ponichala in Tbilisi via Marneuli and Bolnisi to the border with Armenia near Guguti over a distance of 98 kilometres (61 mi). After crossing the Georgian-Armenian border the highway continues as M3 to Vanadzor and Ashtarak, northwest of Yerevan.

The S6 highway is entirely part of European E117 route xwhile the Ponichala to Marneuli segment is also part of the Asian AH81 highway. The route connects with the Georgian S4 highway at its northern terminus in Ponichala and with the S7 highway in Marneuli. Furthermore, the road is mostly located in the Kvemo Kartli region as a two lane road, while the three kilometers in Ponichala are located in the capital region with four lanes.

== Background ==
Since the early 1980s the current S6 route was referred to as A304 within the Soviet road network, which extended to Gyumri via Tashir in the Armenian SSR (nowadays Armenian routes H31 and M1). In Marneuli the A304 connected with the A310 highway (Georgian S7 highway). Prior to the 1980s the route was one of the few Soviet roads to have a number, highway 16, which ran from Vladikavkaz (Ordzhonikidze) via Tbilisi to Gyumri (Leninakan).

In the first years since Georgia regained independence in 1991, the Soviet route designations were maintained until the road numbering system was revised in 1996 and the "roads of international importance" (S-)category was introduced. Then the "S7 Ponichala–Marneuli–Guguti (Armenian border)" replaced the A304 designation.

The S6 is part of the most popular route between Tbilisi and Yerevan, with most traffic taking the Georgian S7 highway in Marneuli which offers alternative routes within Armenia.

== Future ==
As of 2021 there are no plans to upgrade the S6 highway to higher standards or capacity. Most noteworthy is the 2020 rehabilitation of 13 kilometres (8.1 mi) between Saparlo and Guguti (Armenian border). This section was in a very poor condition.

== Route ==
The S6 highway branches off the S4 highway in Ponitchala at the south side of Tbilisi. For the first 4 km within the Tbilisi capital region the road has 4 lanes with a median. Upon entering the Kvemo Kartli region it narrows to a 2 lane highway. Until the town of Marneuli the road passes a few villages, while at Koda the important Sh31 regional highway to Tsalka and Ninotsminda branches off. The centre of Marneuli is an important crossroads. The S7 highway to Armenia begins at the central roundabout in town. This is the most popular way to Armenia from Tbilisi. The S6 continues to Bolnisi and passes through a string of villages. After Bolnisi the road turns south towards Armenia and passes some important historic sites in Georgian history.

== Intersections ==
The entire S6 route overlaps with E117.

Region	Municipality	km	mi		Destinations	Route	Notes
City of Tbilisi		0	0.0	Right junction	Tbilisi Rustavi / Red Bridge ( (Azerbaijan) )	ს 4 ( E117)	
City of Tbilisi		0	0.0	Right junction	Tbilisi Rustavi / Red Bridge ( (Azerbaijan) )	ს 4 ( AH81)	North end AH81 overlap
City of Tbilisi		4	2.5	Tbilisi city limits			
Kvemo Kartli	Tetritsqaro	18	11	Right junction	Tsalka	შ 31	
Kvemo Kartli	Marneuli	25	16	Marneuli town limits			
Kvemo Kartli	Marneuli	28	17	Roundabout	Tsalka Sadakhlo / Armenia Algeti	შ 33	
Kvemo Kartli	Marneuli	28	17	Roundabout	Tsalka Sadakhlo / Armenia Algeti	ს 7 ( E001 / AH81)	South end AH81 overlap
Kvemo Kartli	Marneuli	28	17	Roundabout	Tsalka Sadakhlo / Armenia Algeti	შ 163	
Kvemo Kartli	Marneuli	31	19	Marneuli town limits			
Kvemo Kartli	Bolnisi	36	22	Left junction	Kolagiri fortress	შ 156	
Kvemo Kartli	Bolnisi	37	23	Crosses Khrami River (120 m)			
Kvemo Kartli	Bolnisi	61	38	Crossing	Dzveli Kveshi	შ 155	
Kvemo Kartli	Bolnisi	62	39	Crosses Geta River (70 m)			
Kvemo Kartli	Bolnisi	70	43	Passes Sakdrisi gold mine and archeological site			
Kvemo Kartli	Dmanisi	74	46	Roundabout	Vardisubani / Dmanisi	შ 68	
Kvemo Kartli	Dmanisi	77	48	Crosses Mashavera River			
Kvemo Kartli	Dmanisi	78	48	Passes Dmanisi historic and archeological site			
Kvemo Kartli	Dmanisi	98	61	(Armenia) Armenian border checkpoint. Road continues as ( E117) to Vanadzor and Ashtarak			
1.000 mi = 1.609 km; 1.000 km = 0.621 mi: Concurrency terminus
