= Sadıqlı =

Sadıqlı or Sadykhly may refer to:

- Sadıqlı, Agstafa, Azerbaijan
- Sadıqlı, Tovuz, Azerbaijan
