= Kvemo Sarali =

Kvemo Sarali ქვემო სარალი
- Village
- Location within Georgia Location within Kvemo Kartli
- Coordinates: 41°20′28″N 44°49′47″E
- Country: Georgia
- Mkhare: Kvemo Kartli
- Municipality: Marneuli
- Elevation: 360 m (1,180 ft)

Population (2014)
  - Total: 1,370
- Time zone: UTC+4 (Georgian Time)

Kvemo Sarali (Georgian: ქვემო სარალი, Azerbaijani: Aşağı Saral) is a village in the country of Georgia. The village has a population of 1,370 people and is administratively part of the Shulaveri community (temi, თემი) within the Marneuli Municipality. It is located about 15 kilometres (9.3 mi) south from the municipal center Marneuli and 5 kilometres (3.1 mi) north of the Armenia–Georgia border. The Tbilisi - Marneuli - Sadakhlo railway line passes alongside the village, as well as the S7 international highway to Armenia.

== Demographics ==
Kvemo Sarali had a population of 1,370 according to the 2014 census. Apart from nine residents the village is mono-ethnic Azerbaijani.

Year	2002	2014
Number	1,745	▼1,370
Data: Census 2002 and 2014

== Notable natives ==
- Alexander Mayorov (1942-2017) – Soviet film director, screenwriter, producer.
