= Kolagiri fortress =

Coordinates: 41.4667°N 44.7134°E

Kolagiri Fortress
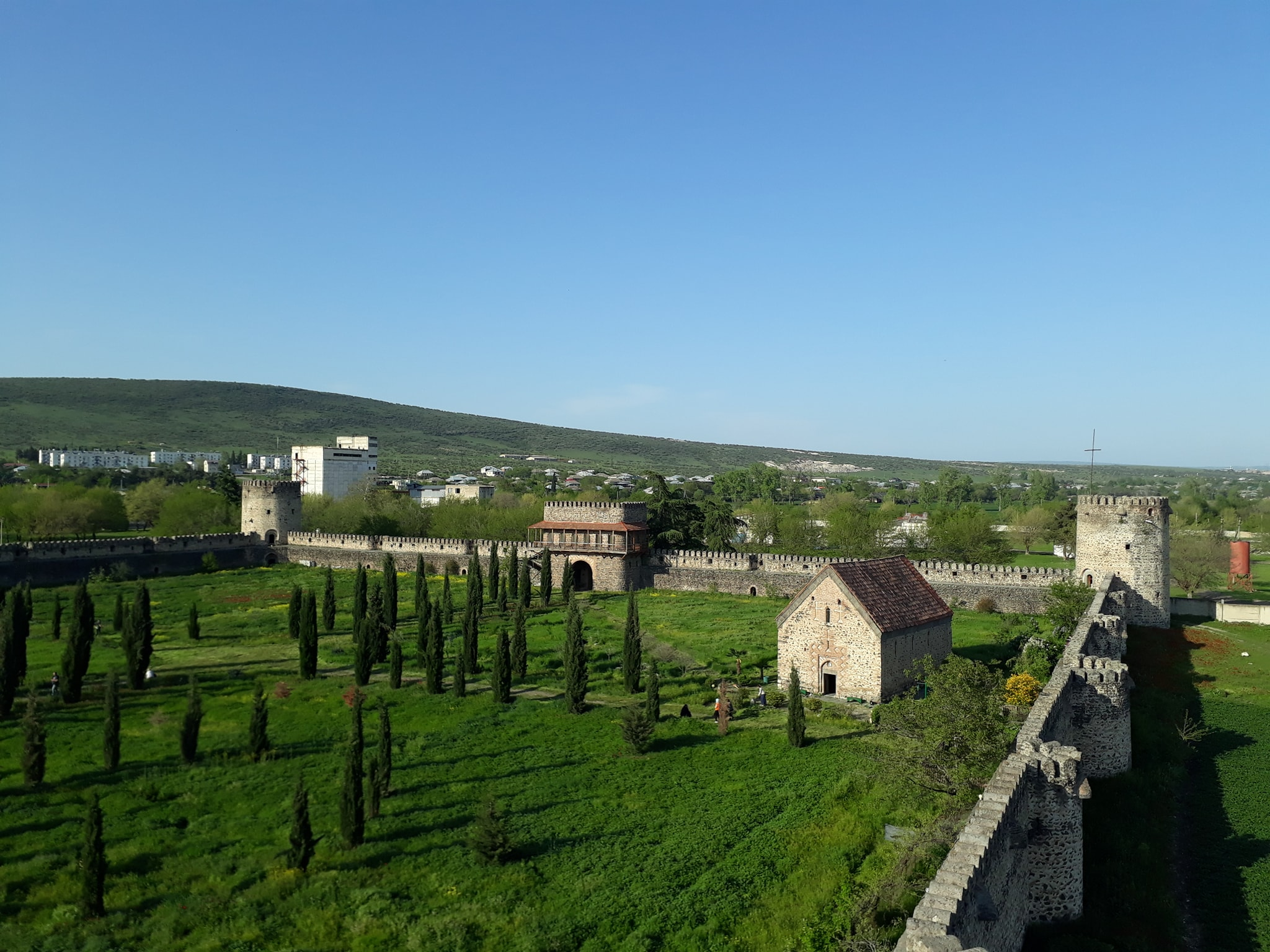

Site information
- Owner: Government of Georgia
- Condition: Ruins

Site history
- Built: 18th century AD

The Kolagiri fortress (Georgian: ქოლაგირის ციხე), is a building of the feudal age (late 18th century), near the daba (borough) Tamarisi, Bolnisi Municipality (Kvemo Kartli region).

== History ==
The fortress was built between 1788-1798 by order of the wife of King Heraclius II, Darejan of the House of Dadiani. In 1801 Darejan wrote to herself: "Build a great fortress and the castle wall". It was the last of its kind in the Kingdom of Kartli-Kakheti. The Kolagiri fortress served as an outpost for Tbilisi and was a hiding place for the surrounding population during Ottoman or Persian raids. At the beginning of the 19th century, the fortress lost its defensive value and was used for some time as a prison.

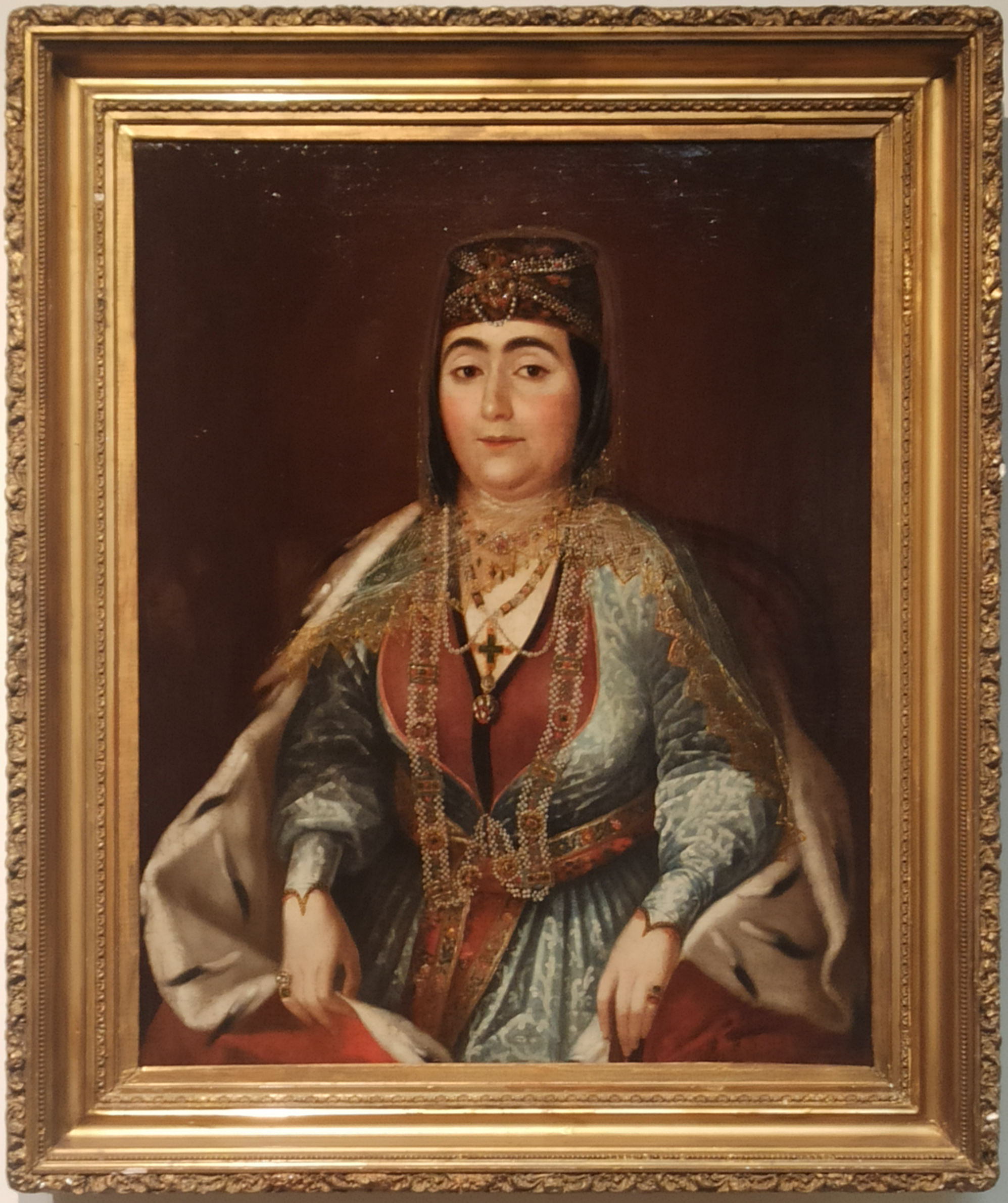
Queen Darejan

The plan of the fort is square with an area of 2000 m². It was built of stone and the bricks were used to decorate the towers and entrances. The 6 m high wall is thicker on the first floor. The towers have four floors, in which the first three were warehouses for weapons, food, and ammunition. Currently the center of the fortress has one active building: the Church and Nunnery of Queen Ketevan the Martyr.

The fort is located just 500 metres (0.31 mi) south from the S6 highway Marneuli - Bolnisi at Tamarisi, at the end of Sh156.

== Sources ==
- Georgian Soviet Encyclopedia, Vol. 10, p. 545, Tb., 1986.
- Zakaraia P., Old Towns and Castles of Georgia, Tb., 1973
- Zakaraia P., Old Castles of Georgia, Tb., 1988
