= E001 =

E001 may refer to:

- E001 series, a Japanese cruise train branded Train Suite Shiki-shima
- European route E001
