= Jandari Lake =

Lake in Georgia and Azerbaijan

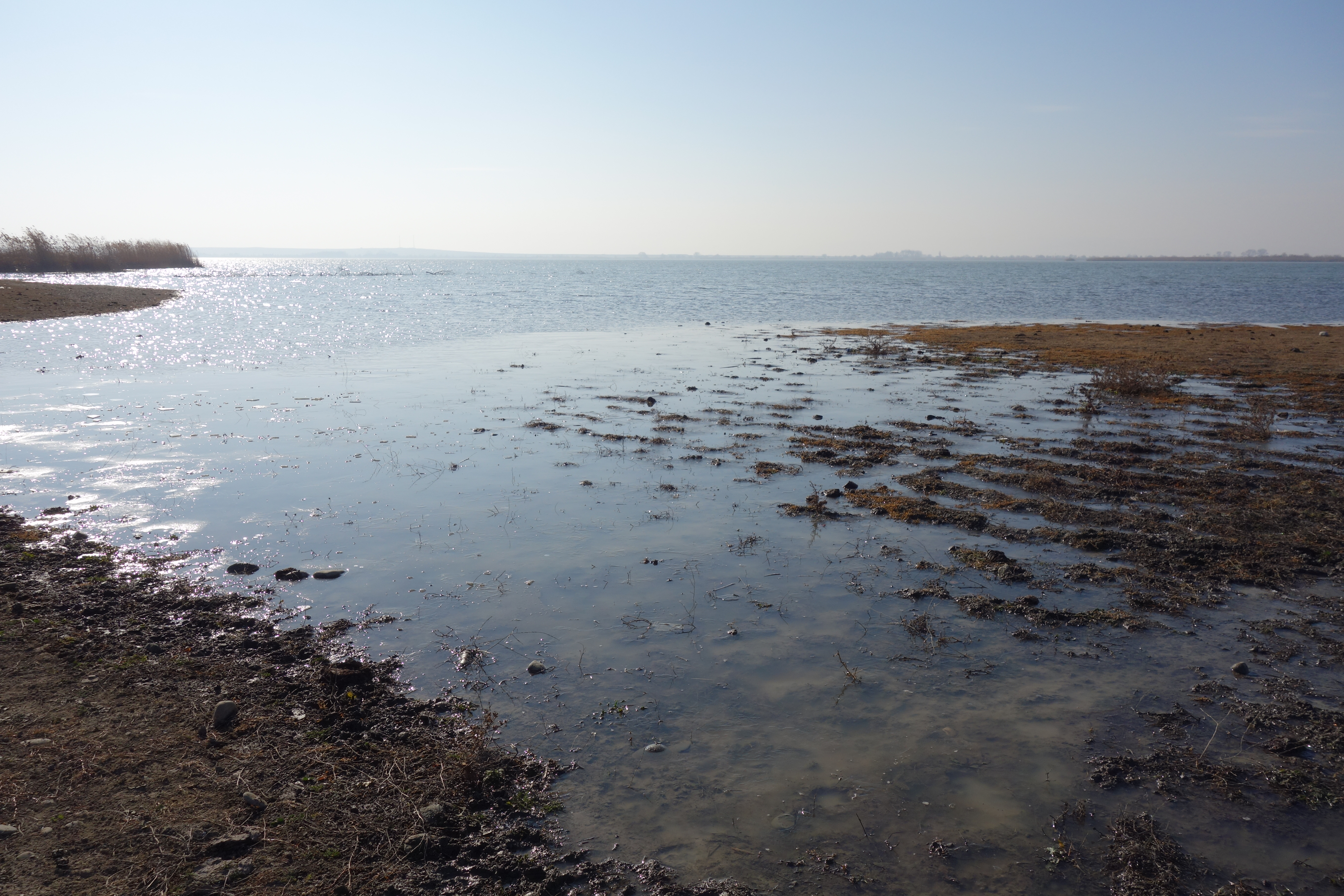
- Northeast shore (Georgian side)

- Location within Georgia Location within Azerbaijan
- Interactive map of Jandari Lake
- Coordinates: 41°25′33″N 45°13′03″E
- Catchment area: 102 km^{2} (39 sq mi)
- Basin countries: Georgia; Azerbaijan
- Max. length: 6.4 km (4.0 mi)
- Max. width: 3 km (1.9 mi)
- Average depth: 3.75 m (12.3 ft)
- Max. depth: 7.2 m (24 ft)
- Water volume: 51 million cubic metres (1.8×10^{9} cu ft)
- Surface elevation: 291.4 m (956 ft)

Jandari Lake (Georgian: ჯანდარის ტბა; Azerbaijani: Candargöl) is a lake on the Azerbaijan–Georgia border, it is located in south-east Georgia and north-west Azerbaijan, at 291,4 metres above sea level. The lake's surface area is 10.6 km^{2}, while the catchment area is 102 km^{2}. The maximal depth is 7.2 m. Some 67% of the basin is located on Georgian territory and 33% in Azerbaijan.

Jandari Lake is surrounded by a blend of semi-desert and steppe vegetation, as well as patches of floodplain forest. The lake is a favoured spot for fishing and birdwatching. It is a resting and wintering site for thousands of water birds.

== History ==
Jandari used to be a shallow, salty lake that would frequently dry up during the summer. In 1870, the construction of Gardabani canal redirected water from the Mtkvari River to the lake, transforming Jandari into a reservoir. The lake was also boosted by inflow from a canal originating from the Tbilisi Samgori reservoir.
