= Kəcavənd =

Coordinates: 40°49′N 45°42′E

Kəcavənd is a village in the municipality of Yanıqlı in the Tovuz Rayon of Azerbaijan.
