= Böyük Xoşdarlı =

Coordinates: 40°49′N 45°40′E

Böyük Xoşdarlı is a village in the municipality of Yanıqlı in the Tovuz District of Azerbaijan.
