= European route E117 =

Road in trans-European E-road network

E117

Route information
- Length: 1,004 km (624 mi)

Major junctions
- North end: Mineralnye Vody, Russia
- South end: Nurduz, Armenia-Iran

Location
- Countries: Russia; Georgia; Armenia; Iran

Highway system
- International E-road network; A Class; B Class

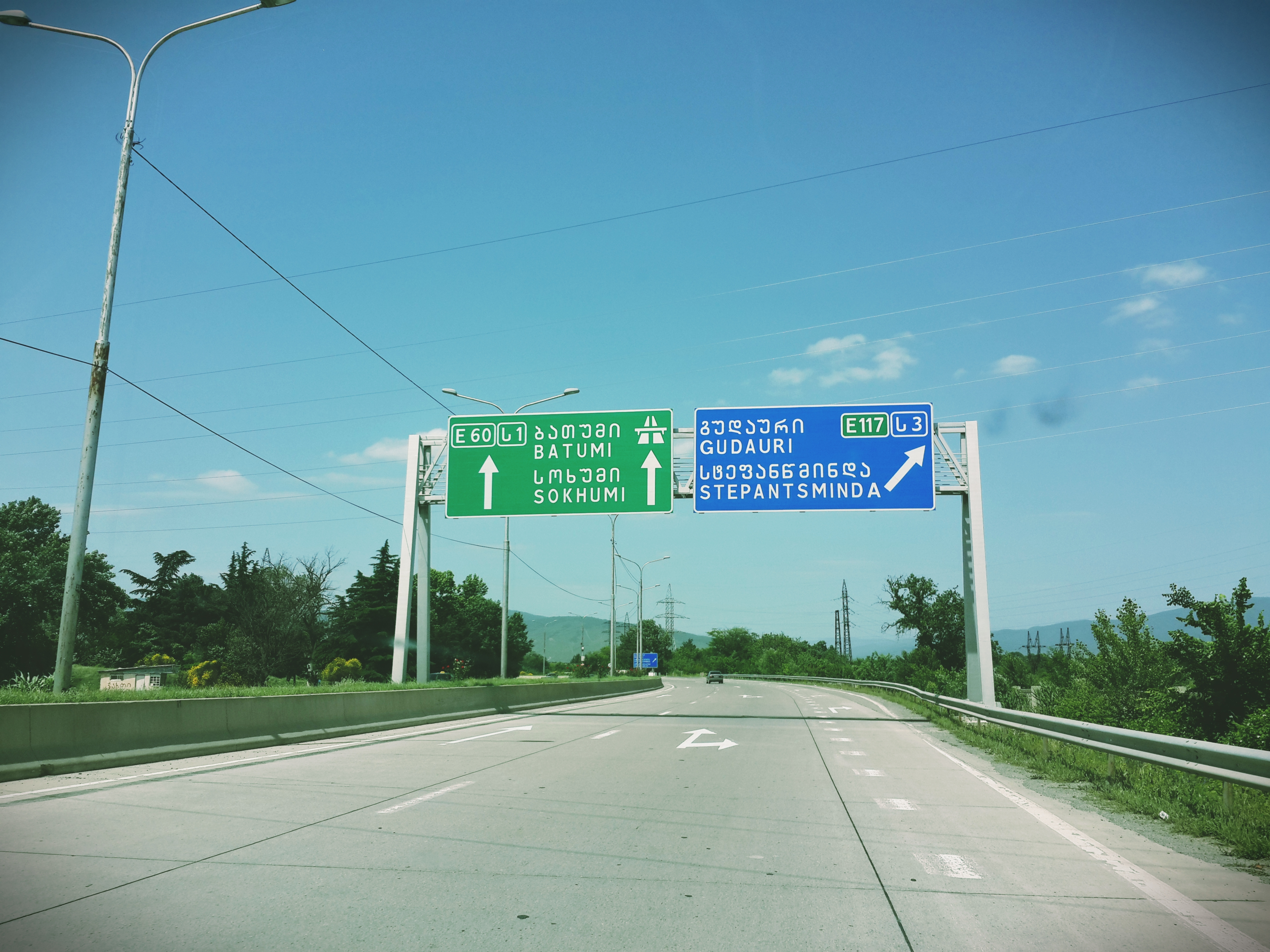
E117 near Mtskheta

European Route E117 is part of the International E-road network, which is a series of main roads in Europe.

== Description ==
The E117 starts from Mineralnye Vody, Russia, via the Georgian Military Road to Georgia's capital Tbilisi, via the Armenian capital Yerevan and on to Meghri on the border of Iran. It runs for a total distance of 1,050 km (650 mi).

Between Mineralnye Vody and Beslan, it is concurrent with E50 and Russian highway M29.

== Route ==
Russia

- R 217: (Concurrent with E50): Mineralnye Vody – Pyatigorsk – Baksan – Nalchik – Beslan
- A 161: Beslan - Vladikavkaz – Nizhniy Lars

Georgia

- ს 3: Larsi - Mtskheta
- ს 1: Mtskheta (Start of Concurrency with E60) - Tbilisi
- ს 9: Tbilisi - Rustavi (End of Concurrency with E60)
- ს 4: Rustavi - Tbilisi
- ს 6: Tbilisi - Marneuli ( E001) – Bolnisi - Kazreti - Guguti

Armenia

- Մ3: Gogavan - Vanadzor ( E001) - Ashtarak ( E691)
- Մ1: Ashtarak ( E691) – Yerevan
- Մ2: Yerevan – Artashat - Yeraskh ( E002) – Noravan – Tatev – Kapan – Kajaran – Meghri - Agarak

Iran

- Road 12: Nurduz
