= Yanıqlı =

Yanygly
- Municipality
- Azerbaijani: Yanıqlı
- Location within Azerbaijan
- Coordinates: 40°50′33″N 45°40′30″E
- Country: Azerbaijan
- District: Tovuz

Population
  - Total: 2,395
- Time zone: UTC+4 (AZT)
  - Summer (DST): UTC+5 (AZT)

Yanıqlı (also, Yanygly, historically Khaghkhagh or Xałxał) is a village and municipality in the Tovuz Rayon of Azerbaijan. It has a population of 2,395. The municipality consists of the villages of Yanygly, Böyük Xoşdarlı, Sadygly, and Kəcavənd.
