= Danaçı =

- Municipality
- Location within Azerbaijan Location within Shaki-Zagatala Economic Region
- Coordinates: 41°32′56″N 46°24′55″E
- Country: Azerbaijan
- Rayon: Zaqatala

Population
  - Total: 6,796
- Time zone: UTC+4 (AZT)
  - Summer (DST): UTC+5 (AZT)

Danaçı (also, Danachi, Danachy, and Tanachi) is a village and municipality in the Zaqatala Rayon of Azerbaijan. It is situated near the Azerbaijan–Georgia border and has a population of 6,796.

== Gallery ==
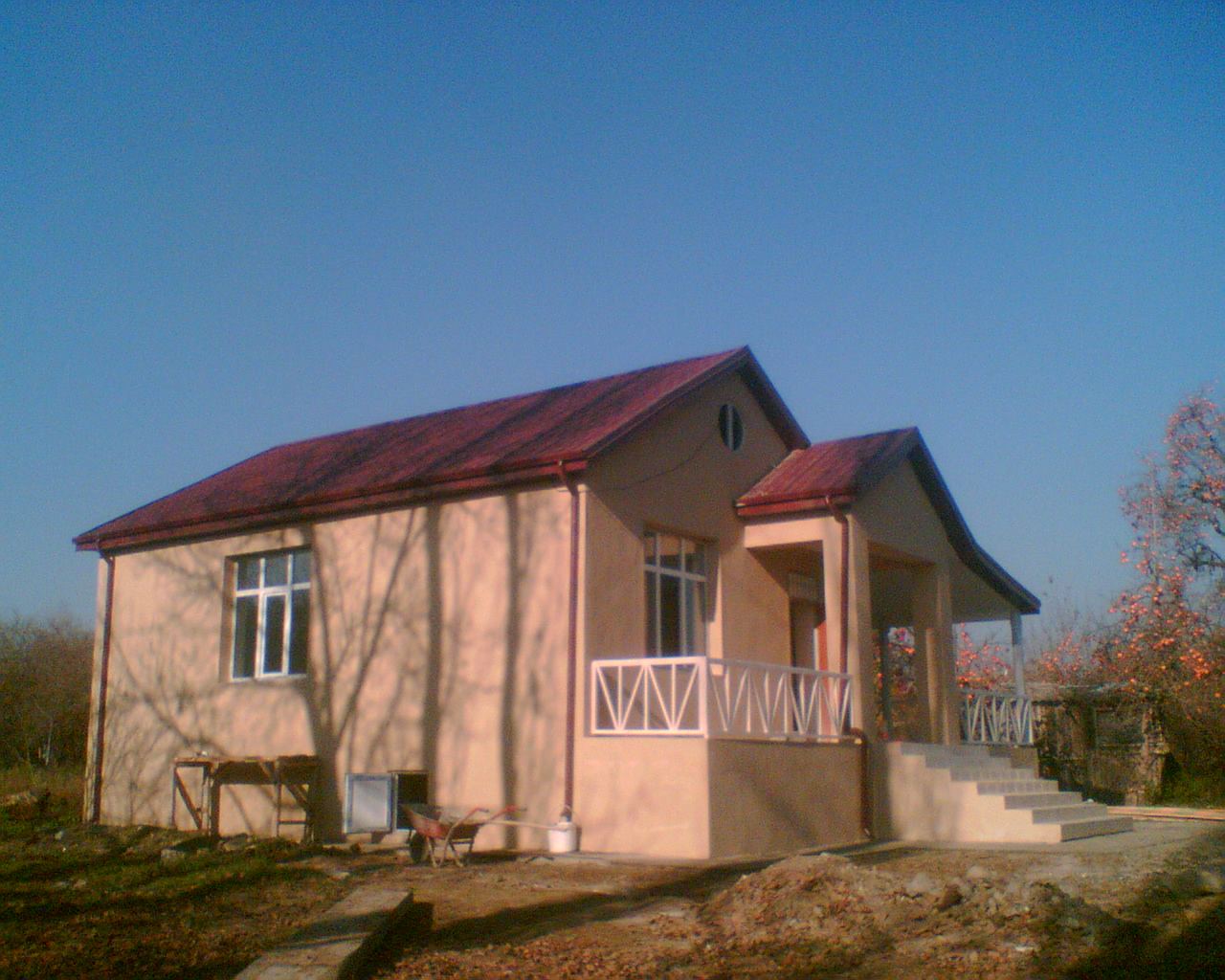

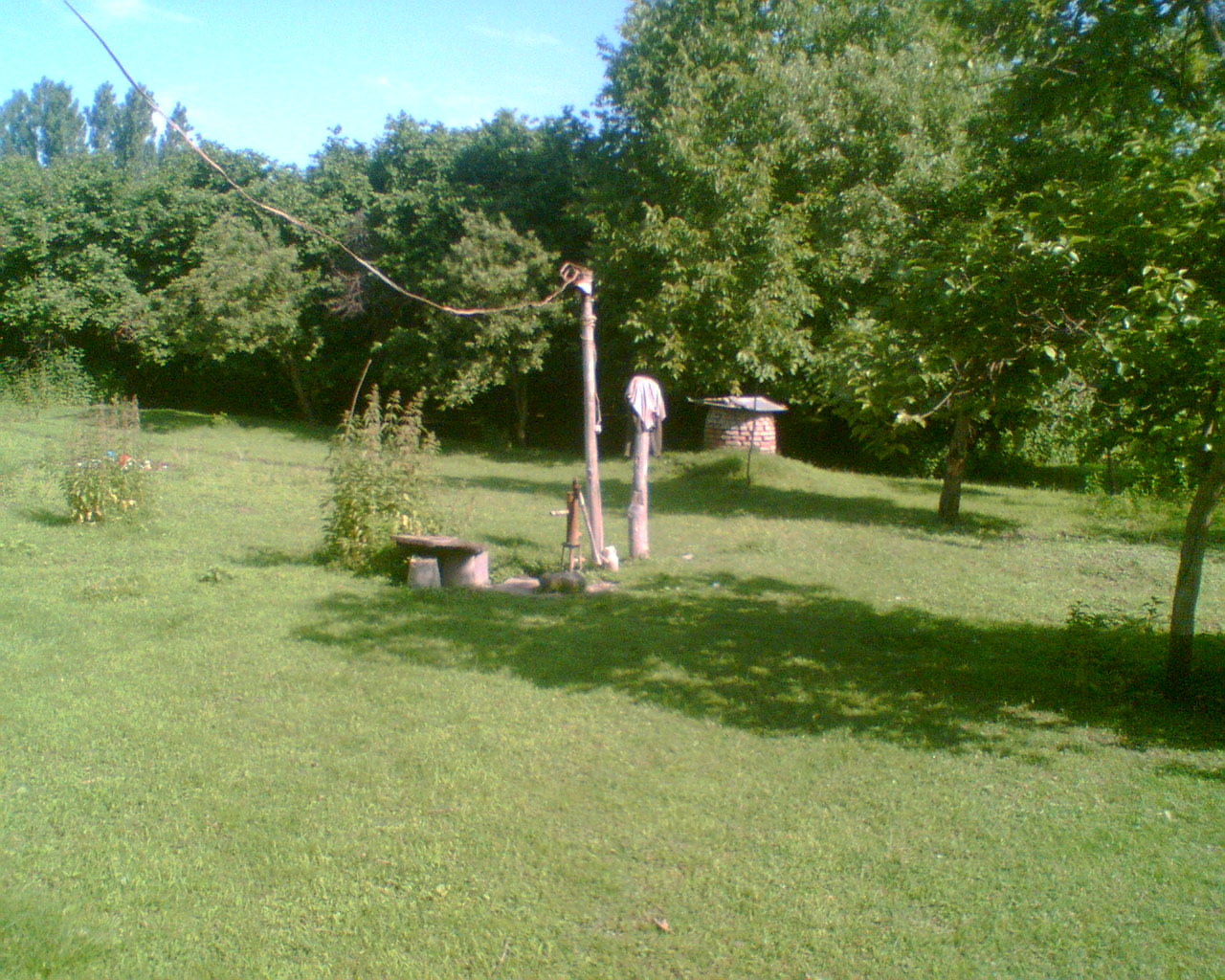

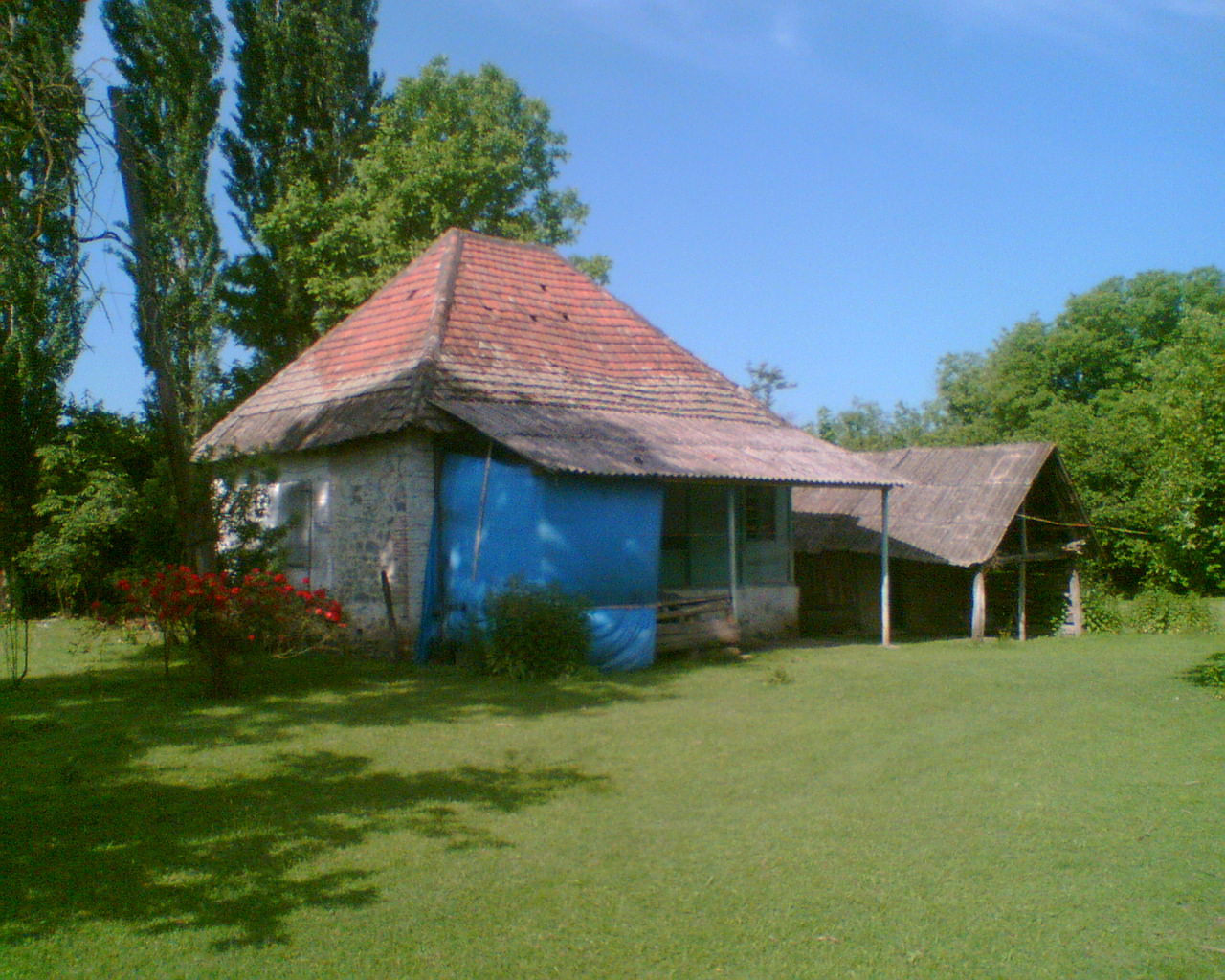

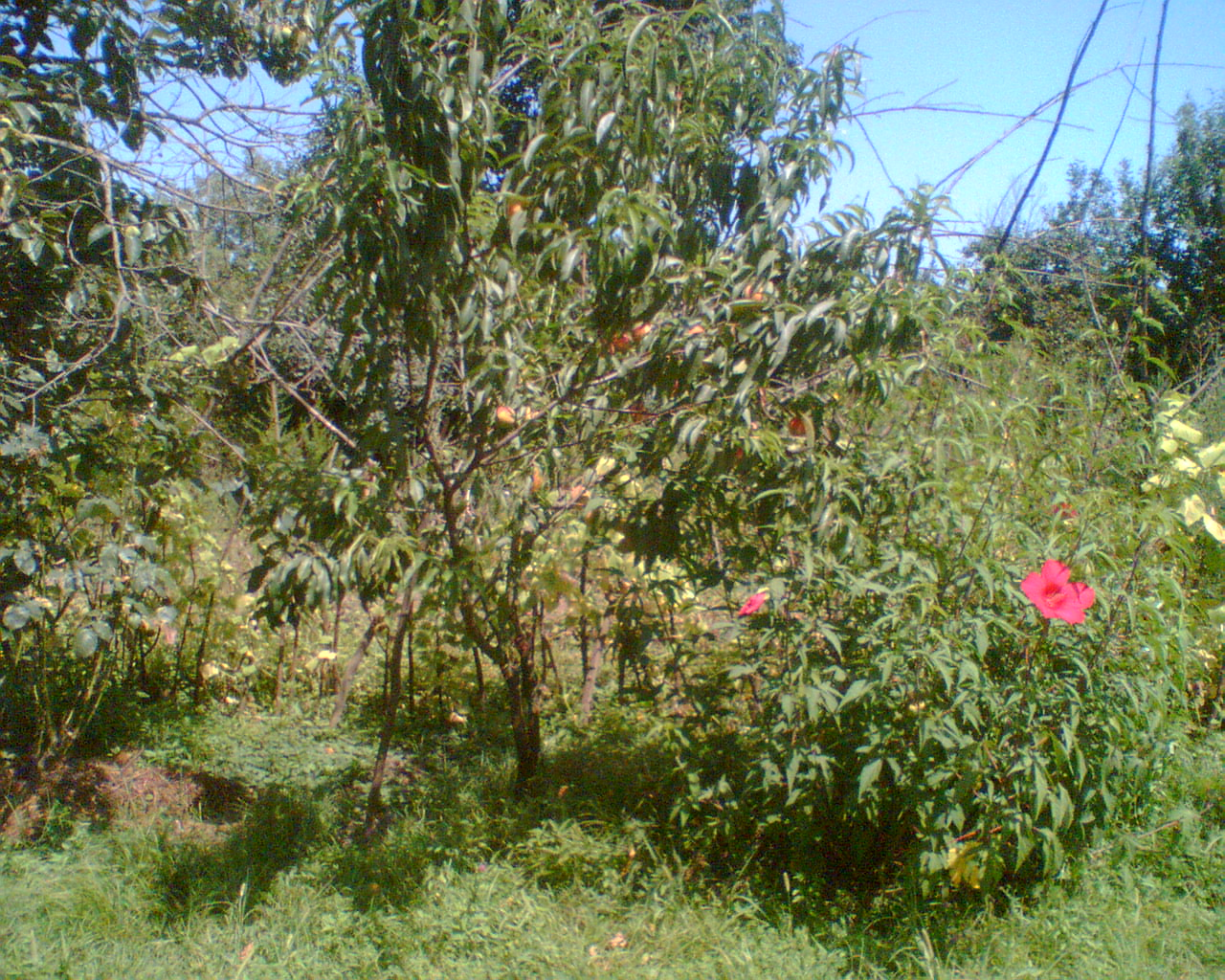
