= Sadıqlı, Agstafa =

Sadıqlı
- Municipality
- Location within Azerbaijan
- Coordinates: 41°22′12″N 45°08′36″E
- Country: Azerbaijan
- Rayon: Agstafa

Population
  - Total: 2,849
- Time zone: UTC+4 (AZT)
  - Summer (DST): UTC+5 (AZT)

Sadıqlı (also, Sadıxlı) is a village and municipality in the Agstafa Rayon of Azerbaijan next to the Azerbaijan–Georgia border. It has a population of 2,849.
