= Sadıqlı, Tovuz =

Sadygly
- Azerbaijani: Sadıqlı
- Location within Azerbaijan
- Coordinates: 40°49′N 45°41′E
- Country: Azerbaijan
- District: Tovuz
- Municipality: Yanygly
- Time zone: UTC+4 (AZT)
  - Summer (DST): UTC+5 (AZT)

Sadıqlı (also, Sadygly) is a village in the Tovuz District of Azerbaijan. The village forms part of the municipality of Yanygly.
