= European route E001 =

Road in trans-European E-road network

E001

Route information
- Length: 117 km (73 mi)

Major junctions
- North end: Marneuli, Georgia
- South end: Vanadzor, Armenia

Location
- Countries: Georgia, Armenia

Highway system
- International E-road network; A Class; B Class

European route E001 is a European B class road from Marneuli, Georgia to Vanadzor, Armenia part of the United Nations international E-road network.

== Route ==
- Georgia
  - ს 7: Marneuli ( E117) - Sadakhlo
- Armenia
  - Մ6: Bagratashen - Vanadzor ( E117)
