= Red Bridge (border) =

Red Bridge: წითელი ხიდი (Georgian); Qırmızı Körpü (Azerbaijani)
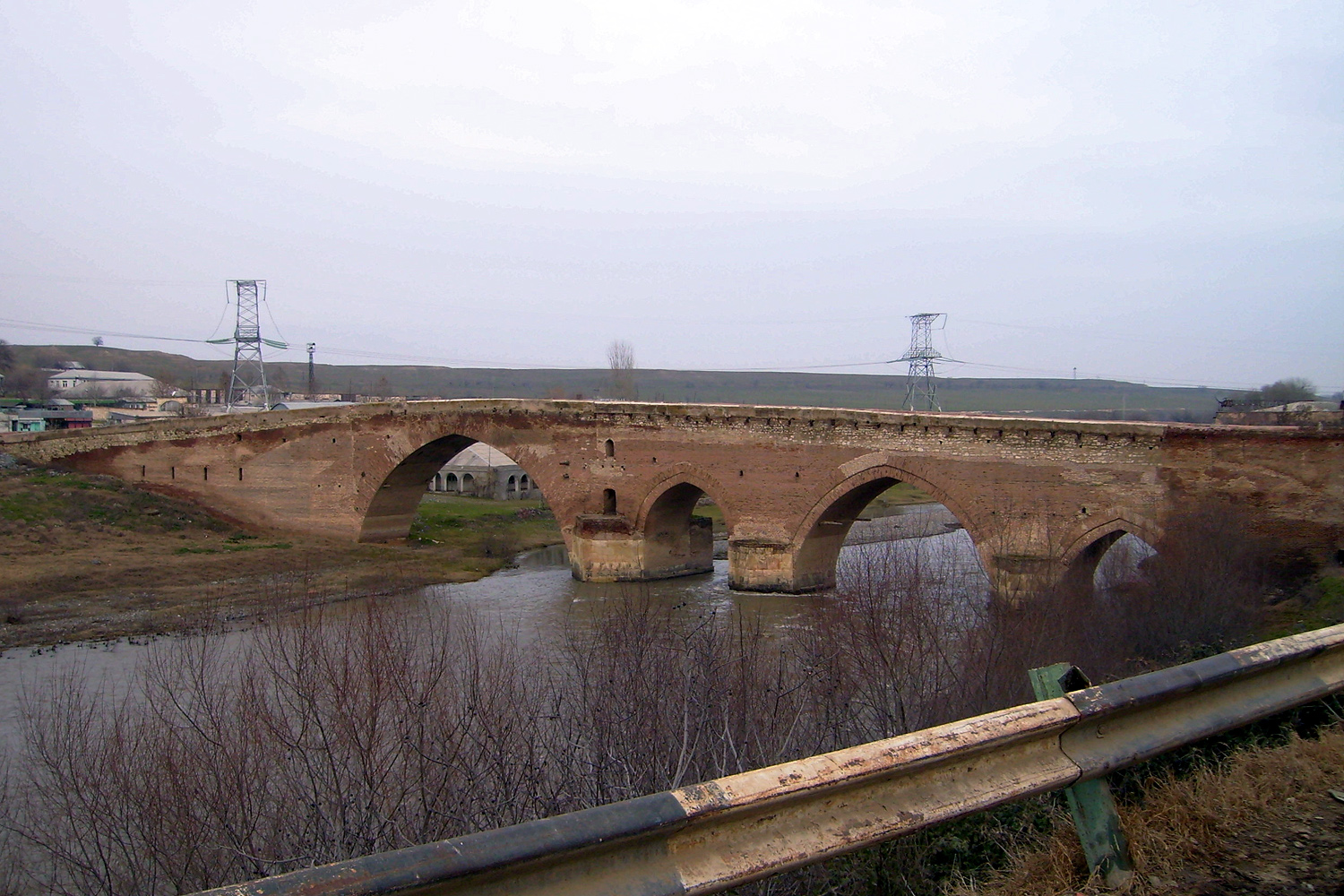
- The Red Bridge
- Coordinates: 41°19′45″N 45°04′23″E
- Carries: Pedestrians
- Crosses: Khrami river
- Locale: Georgian-Azerbaijani border

Characteristics
- Design: Arch bridge
- Material: Brickwork
- Total length: 175 m (574 ft)
- Width: 4.3 m (14 ft) (middle) /11.7 m (38 ft) (ends)
- Longest span: 26.1 m (86 ft)
- No. of spans: 4
- Piers in water: 3

History
- Opened: 17th century

Location
- Interactive map of Red Bridge

Red Bridge (Azerbaijani: Qırmızı Körpü; Georgian: წითელი ხიდი, Tsiteli Khidi) is the border crossing between Georgia and Azerbaijan on the Tbilisi to Ganja road. The term translates into English as Red Bridge, and is so named because there is a red-brick arch bridge across the Khrami River in the no-man's land area between the border posts. The bridge's current structure is mostly 17th century, but there has been a bridge on the site since the 12th century crossing. The 'red' bridge had been in day-to-day use until 1998, when a new and considerably larger bridge was completed as part of the TRACECA (Europe-Caucasus-Asia) project.

== Red Bridge Market ==
Throughout the 1990s there was a large no-man's land market here largely operated by ethnic Azerbaijanis from Georgia's Marneuli area. The market was controversially closed in spring 2006 as part of Georgia's anti-smuggling campaign.

== See also ==
- List of international bridges
