= Azerbaijan–Georgia border =

International border

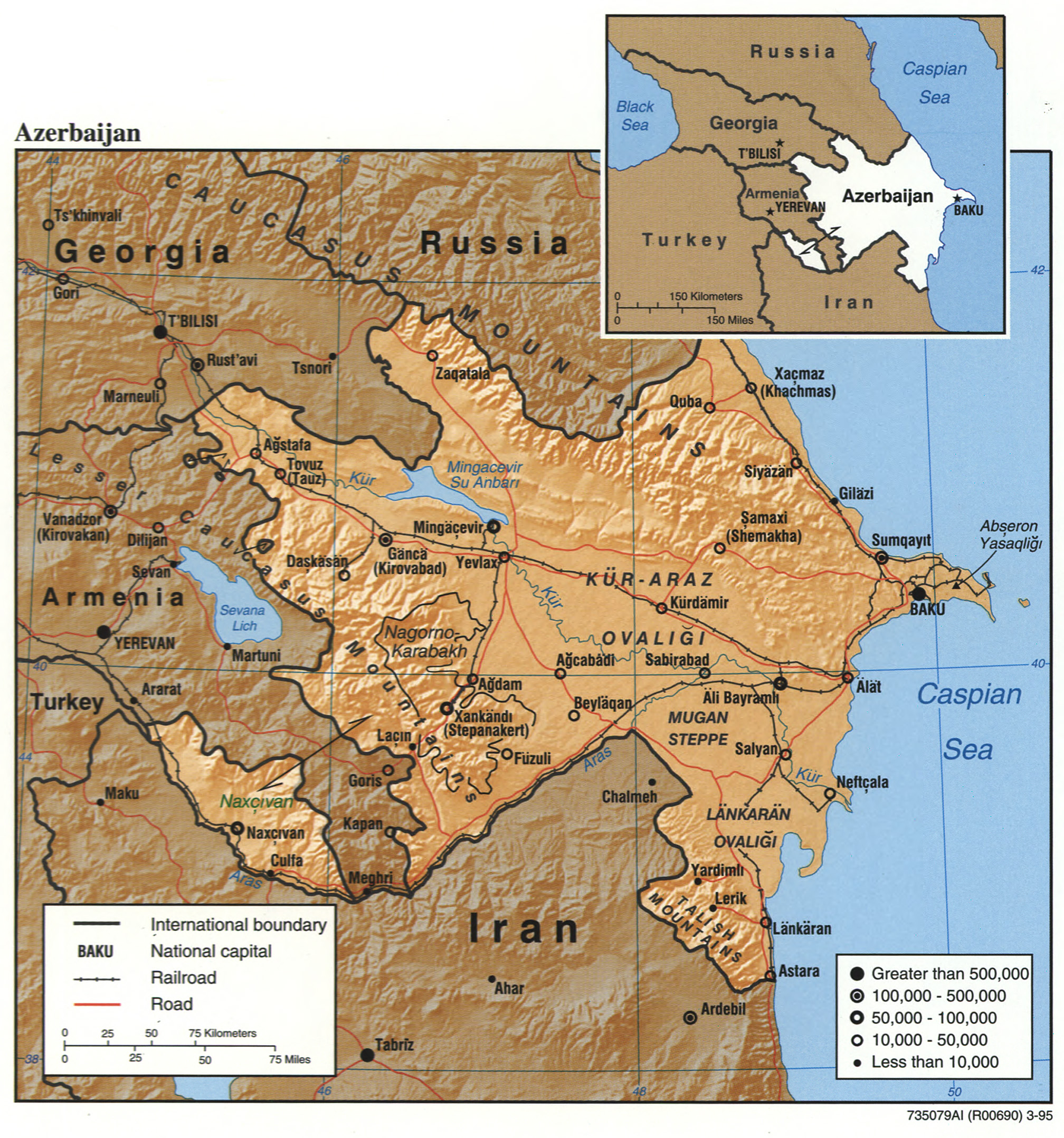
Map of Azerbaijan, with Georgia to the north-west

Azerbaijani and Georgian boundary markers

The Azerbaijan–Georgia border (Azerbaijani: Azərbaycan–Gürcüstan sərhədi, Georgian: აზერბაიჯან-საქართველოს საზღვარი, romanized: azerbaijan-sakartvelos sazghvari) is the international boundary between Azerbaijan and Georgia. It is 428 km (266 mi) in length and runs from the tripoint with Armenia in the west to the tripoint with Russia in the east.

== Description ==
The border starts in the west at the tripoint with Armenia and proceeds overland to the north-east, cutting through Jandari Lake, before turning to the south-east down to the vicinity of Azerbaijan's Mingachevir reservoir. The border then follows the Alazani river as it flows north-east and then north-west, leaving the river due east of Tsnori and proceeding overland to the Russian tripoint.

== History ==
During the 19th century the Caucasus region was contested between the declining Ottoman Empire, Persia and Russia, which was expanding southwards. Russia formally annexed the eastern Georgian Kingdom of Kartli and Kakheti in 1801, followed by the western Georgian Kingdom of Imereti in 1804. Over the course of the 1800s Russian pushed its southern frontier southwards, at the expense of the Persian and Ottoman Empires. By the Russo-Persian War (1804–1813) and the subsequent Treaty of Gulistan, Russia acquired the bulk of what is now Azerbaijan and parts of Armenia. Russia organised its Georgian and Azeri territories into the governorates of Tiflis, Kutaisi, Baku, Elisabethpol.

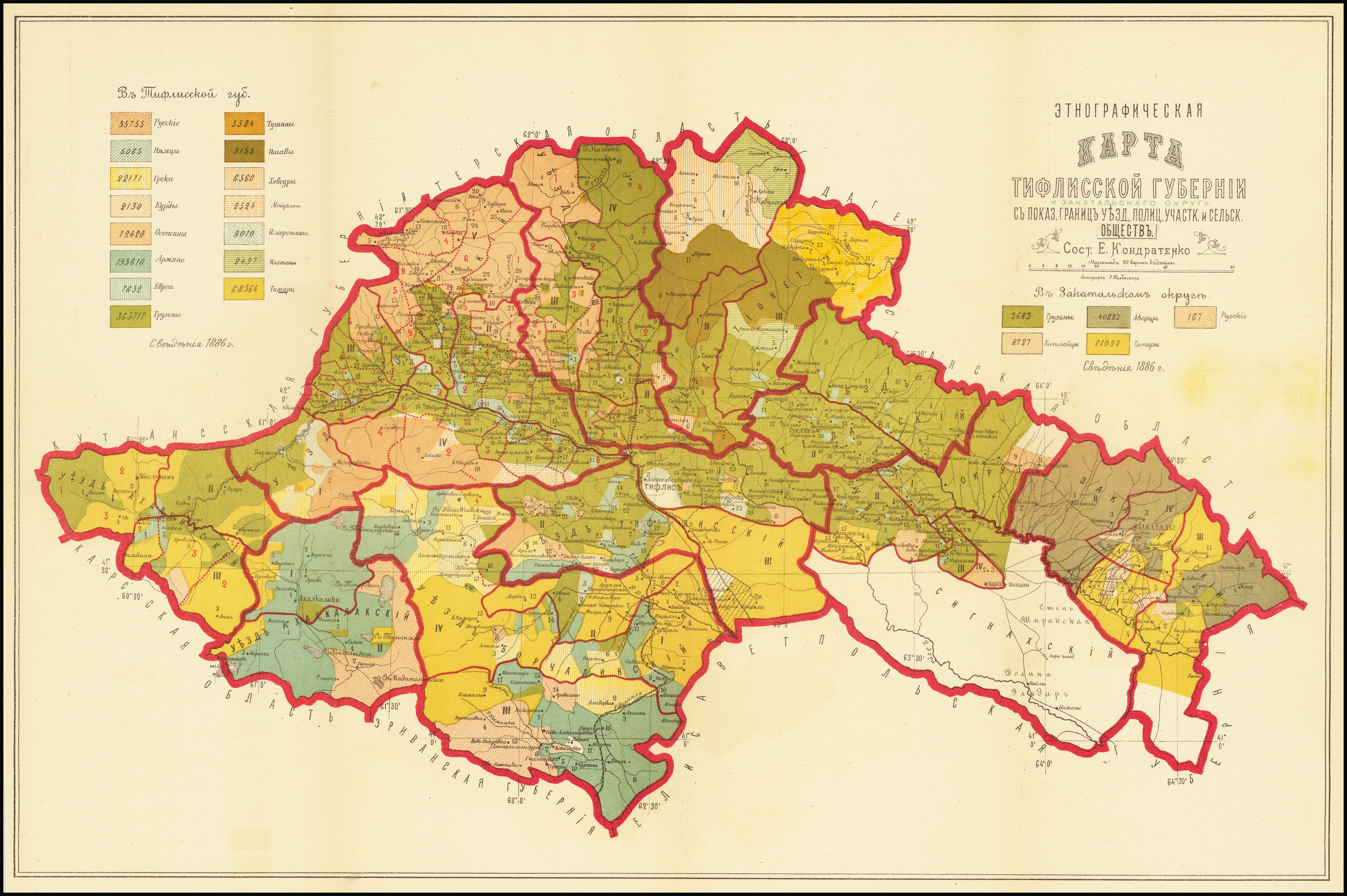
Map of the former Tiflis Governorate, with the disputed Zakatala okrug in the east

Following the 1917 Russian Revolution, the peoples of the southern Caucasus had declared the Transcaucasian Democratic Federative Republic (TDFR) in 1918 and started peace talks with the Ottomans. Internal disagreements led to Georgia leaving the federation in May 1918, followed shortly thereafter by Armenia and Azerbaijan, however the borders between the three republic were contested. The dispute between Azerbaijan and Georgia centred on the area of Zakatal Okrug (Zaqatala) within the former Tiflis Governorate. When Russia recognised the independence of Georgia via the Treaty of Moscow (1920), it recognised Georgian ownership of Zakatal, prompting protests by the Azeri government. In May 1920 it was agreed that a Russian-sponsored delimitation would decide the fate of the area. Much of the border was agreed upon at peace talks held on 12 June 1920, with Zaqatala to be decided by the Russian-led commission.

In 1920 Russia's Red Army invaded Azerbaijan and Armenia, ending the independence of both, followed in February–March 1921 by Georgia. On 5 July 1921 Russia confirmed that the non-disputed sections of the Azeri-Georgian border would remain as they were, whilst transferring Zakatal to Azerbaijan, with this arrangement finalised by treaty on 15 November 1921. In 1922 all three states were incorporated into the Transcaucasian SFSR within the USSR, before being separated in 1936.

The boundary became an international frontier in 1991 following the dissolution of the Soviet Union and the independence of its constituent republics. Work began in 1994 on the delimitation of the border but progress has been slow due to overlapping claims. Part of the border around the Red Bridge remains mined, a legacy of the First Nagorno-Karabakh War in the 1990s when Azerbaijan feared that Armenia would take advantage of chaos in Georgia's and utilise the area to launch attacks on its territory. The site of the David Gareja monastery complex, a sacred site to Georgians which sits directly by the border, has proven especially contentious. There is a sizeable Azeri minority in Georgia, concentrated especially in the southern municipalities of Kvemo Kartli region, as well as a Georgian minority in Azerbaijan, concentrated especially in the Saingilo region where they are known as Ingiloys.

== Settlements ==
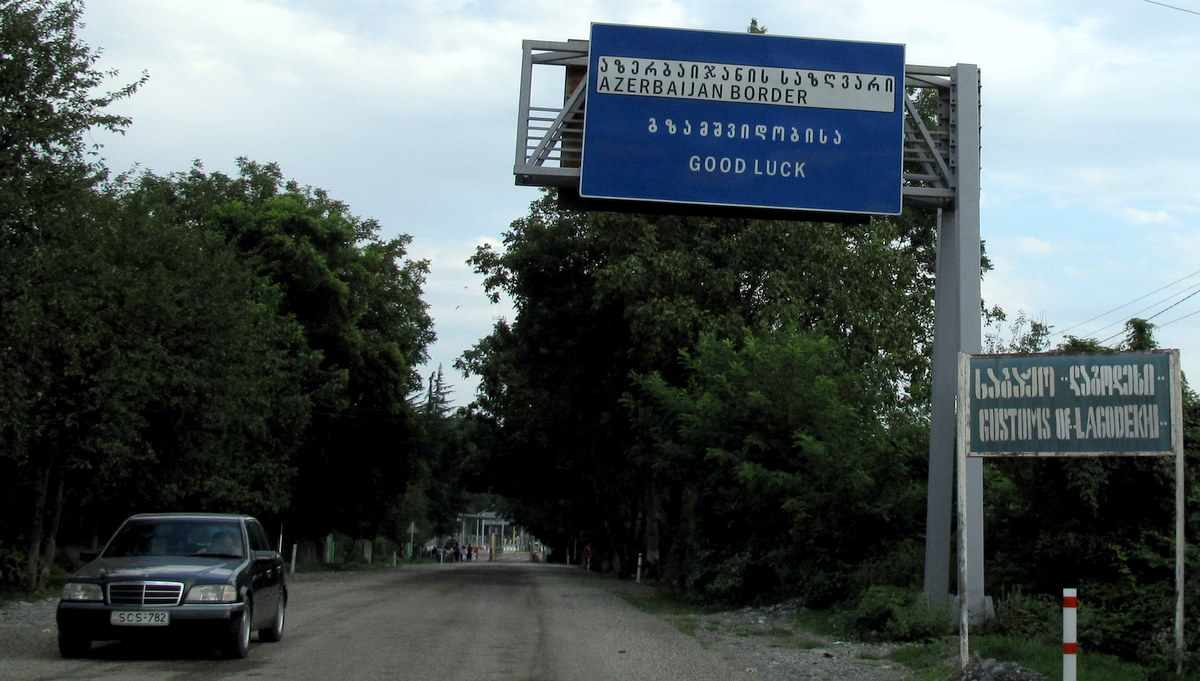
A crossing on the border

=== Azerbaijan ===
- İkinci Şıxlı
- Sadıqlı
- Danaçı
- Balakən

=== Georgia ===
- Kesalo
- Zemo-Kedi
- Kvemi-Kedi
- Erisimedi
- Vardisubani
- Karsubani
- Lagodekhi

== Border crossings ==
The following border crossings operate between the two countries:

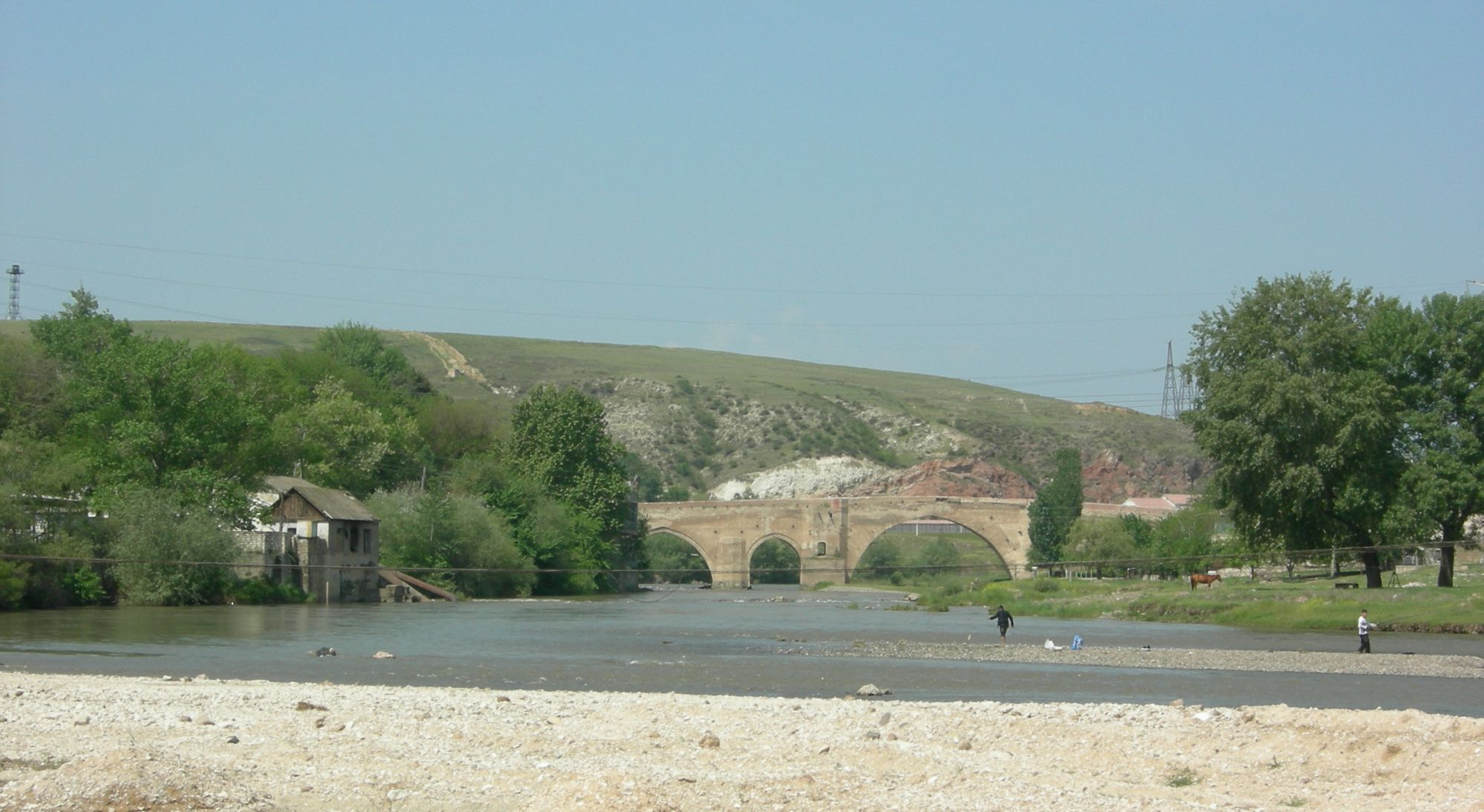
The Red Bridge border crossing

Azeri name	Georgian name	Type of crossing	location
İkinci Şıxlı	Tsiteli Kheli	road (Red Bridge)	
Sadıqlı	Vakhtangisi	road	
Böyük Kəsik	Gardabani	rail	
Mazimgara	Lagodekhi	road	
Muğanlı	Samtatskaro	road	

== See also ==
- Azerbaijan–Georgia relations
- Baku–Tbilisi–Kars railway
