= Sadakhlo =

Sadakhlo სადახლო
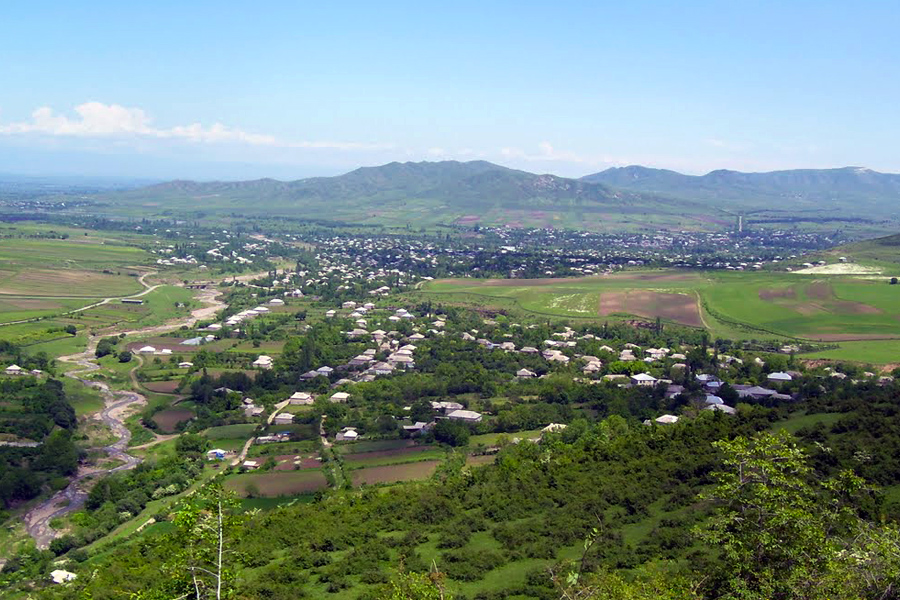

- Location within Georgia Location within Kvemo Kartli
- Coordinates: 41°14′20″N 44°47′16″E
- Country: Georgia
- Mkhare: Kvemo Kartli
- Municipality: Marneuli
- Elevation: 430 m (1,410 ft)

Population (2014)
  - Total: 7,337
- Climate: Cfa

Sadakhlo (Georgian: სადახლო, Azerbaijani: Sadaxlı) is a village in Georgia located in the southern part of country in the administrative territory of Marneuli Municipality (Kvemo Kartli Region) at the border with Armenia. The village is about 27 kilometres (17 mi) south of the municipal center Marneuli and 50 kilometres (31 mi) south of the capital Tbilisi. It is situated along the left bank of the Debeda river. Sadakhlo is the largest village in Georgia, and is the center of the eponymous administrative community (თემი, temi) that includes four other nearby villages: Burma, Tazakendi, Molaoghli, and Khuldara.

The Sadakhlo market played a remarkable role in the interaction between Karapapakhs and Armenians, in light of the Nagorno-Karabakh conflict. Sadakhlo is almost entirely populated with Karapapakhs, and is an important border town with Armenia. Since Georgia took a neutral stance in the conflict, the village became a neutral territory where both peoples could freely and safely interact with each other.

Six kilometers west of Sadakhlo, in the village of Tsopi along the national route Sh37 to Akhkerpi, the ruins of the medieval Tsopi fortress are located. This castle dates from the 5th-6th century.

== Population ==
The population of Sadakhlo village is 7,337, according to the 2014 census. Apart from a few dozen people, the village is Karapapakh (99.8%).

Year	1897	1923	1939	1959	1970	1979	1989	2002	2014
Number	-	1,839	-	-	▲5,185	▲6,756	-	▲9,486	▼7,337
Data: 1923 1970, 1979, Census 2002 and 2014 Note: (Note: The 2014 census found an inexplicable gap with the data from the national statistical office Geostat. UN-assisted research has found the 2002 census was inflated by about 8-9 percent. See, "1. Introduction", Page 1.)

== Transport ==
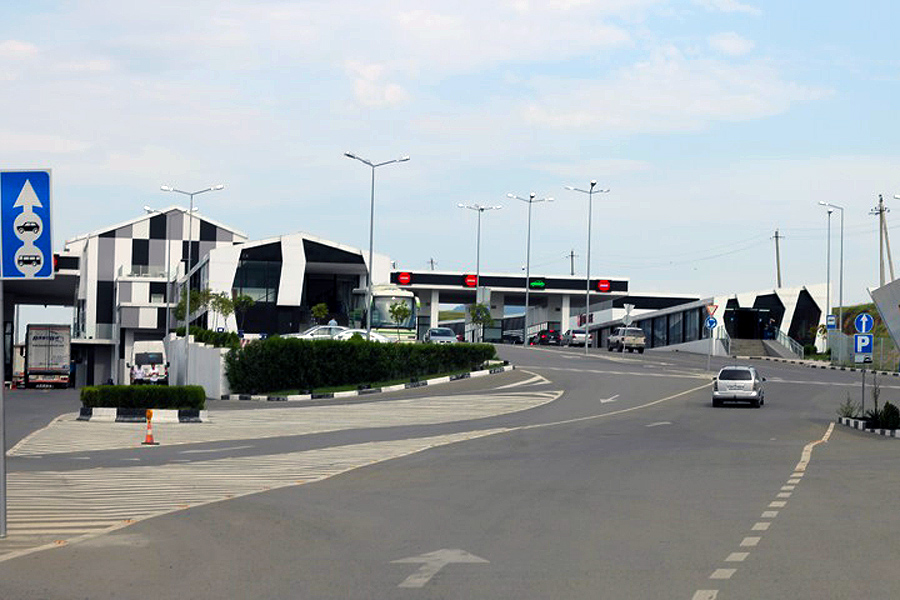
Sadakhlo checkpoint

The road of international importance S7 (E001), the main road between Tbilisi and Yerevan (Armenia), passes through Sadakhlo. The Sadakhlo - Bagratashen border crossing is the most important of the four vehicular crossings between Georgia and Armenia. More than 1.2 million incoming travellers were registered in 2019. This is 15.7% of all inbound travellers to Georgia. This also leads to additional investments in infrastructure. With European money the car bridge across the Debeda is being renovated and expanded to four lanes.

There is a train station in Sadakhlo, which is on the Tbilisi - Gyumri - Yerevan railway line which opened in 1899. The railway runs along the village and crosses the border parallel to the S7. There are frequent night trains between Tbilisi and Yerevan. The station serves not only as a terminus for the Tbilisi - Sadakhlo commuter trains and stop for the international trains, but also as a border post for the latter. Nearly 3,400 passengers entered Georgia here in 2019.

From the center of Sadakhlo, the national route Sh37 heads west to Akhkerpi, which also has a border crossing to Armenia. It is Georgia's least used border crossing with 133 arriving travelers in 2019.

== See also ==
- Kvemo Kartli
- Marneuli Municipality
- Battle of Sadakhlo
