= Marneuli =

- City
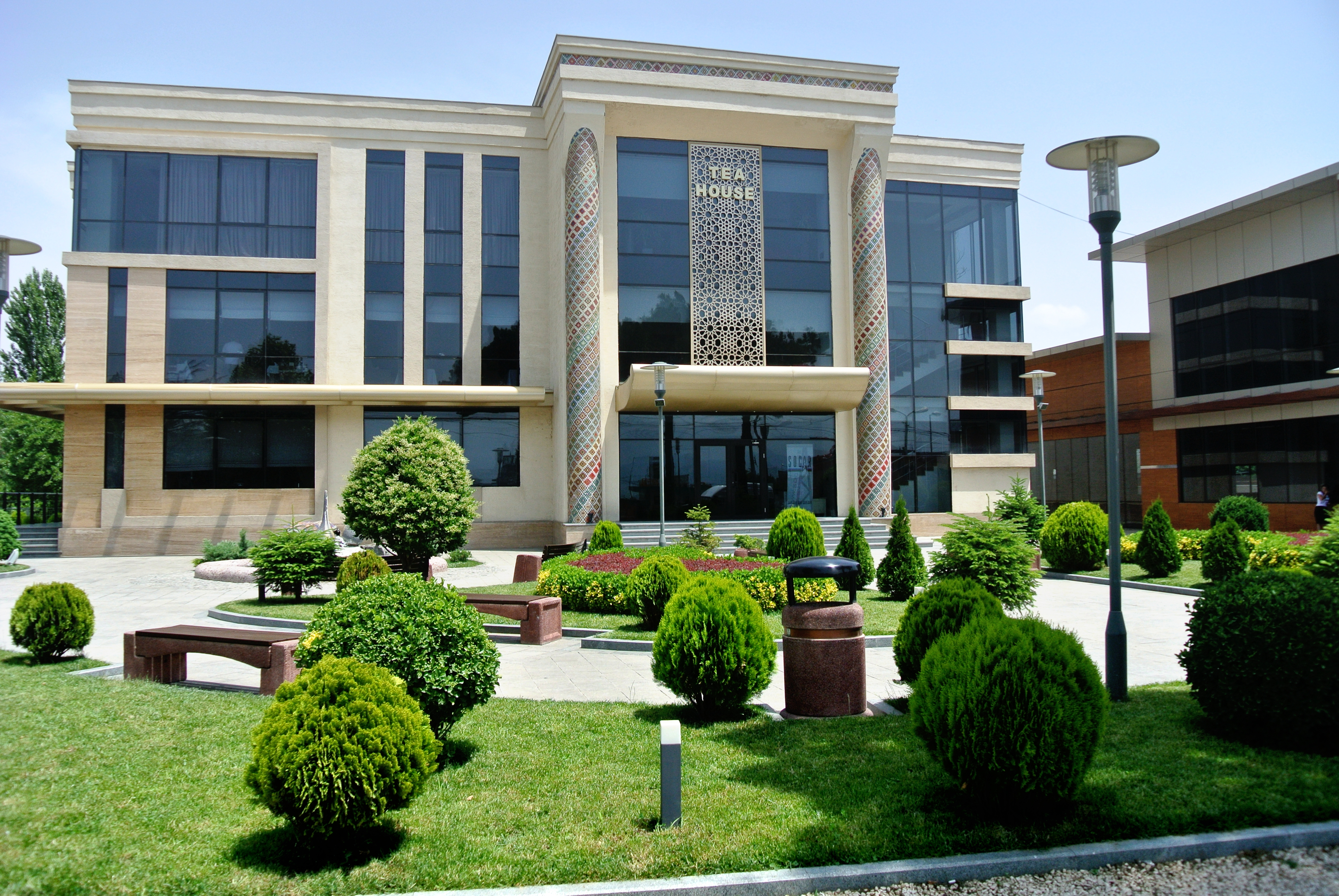
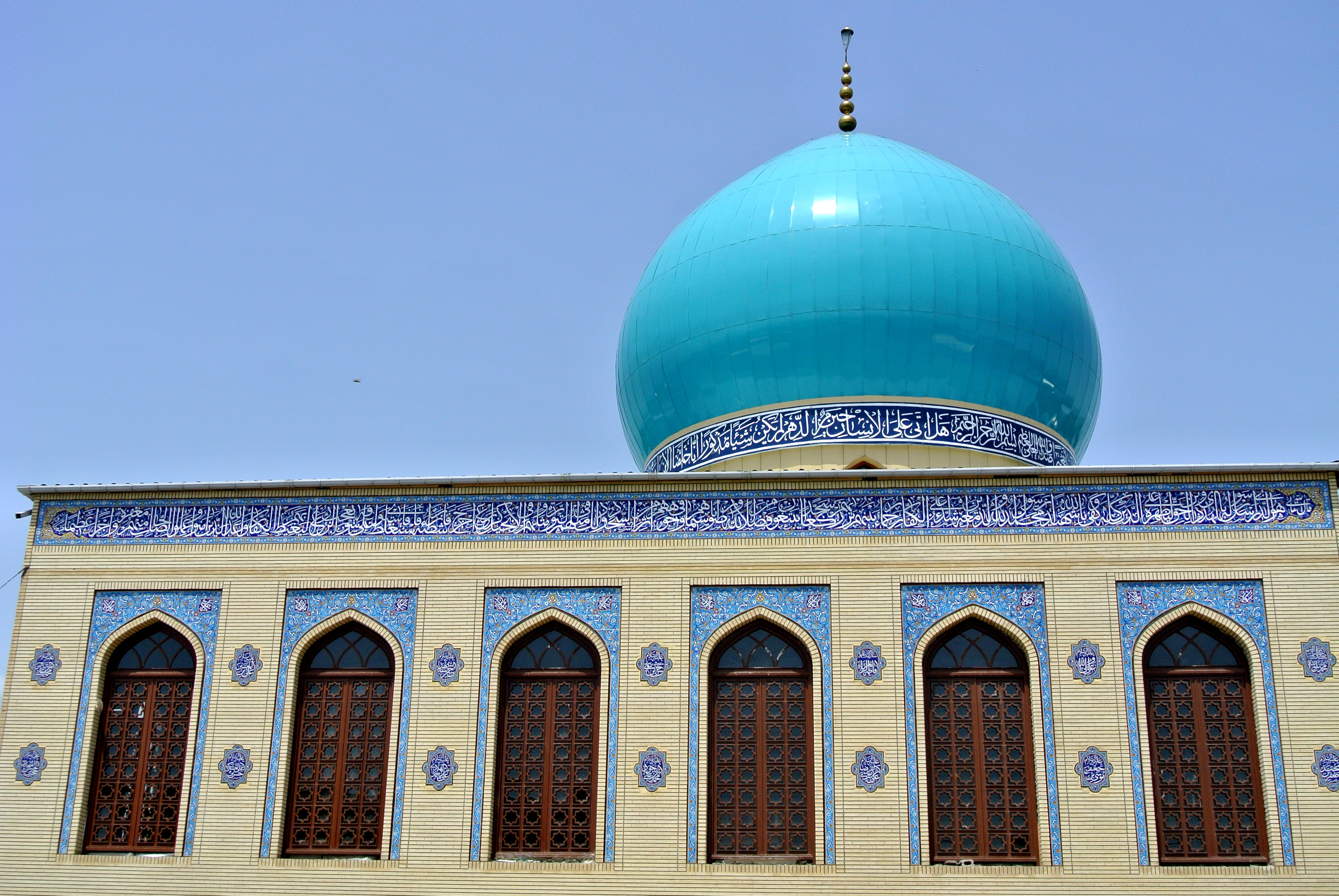
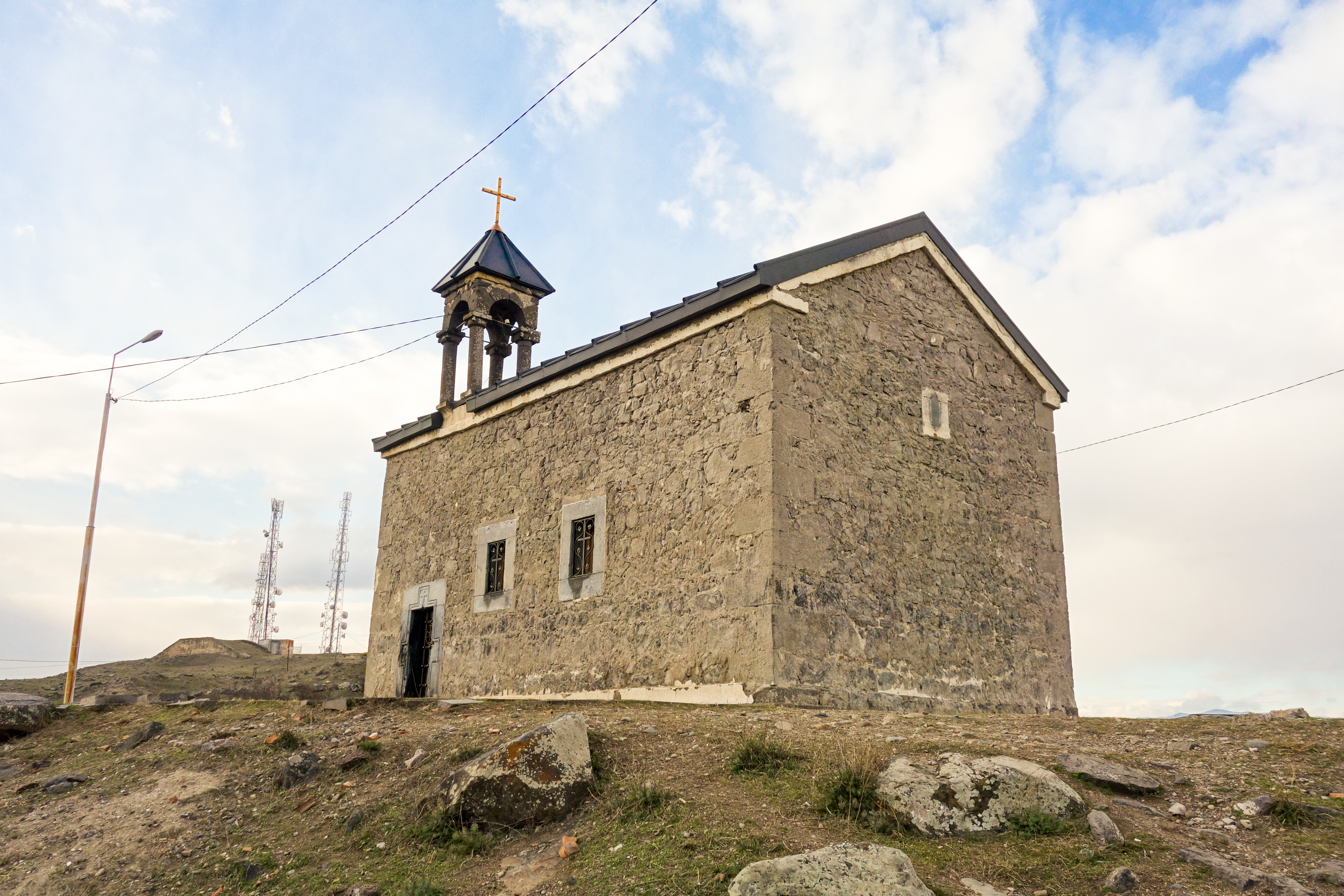
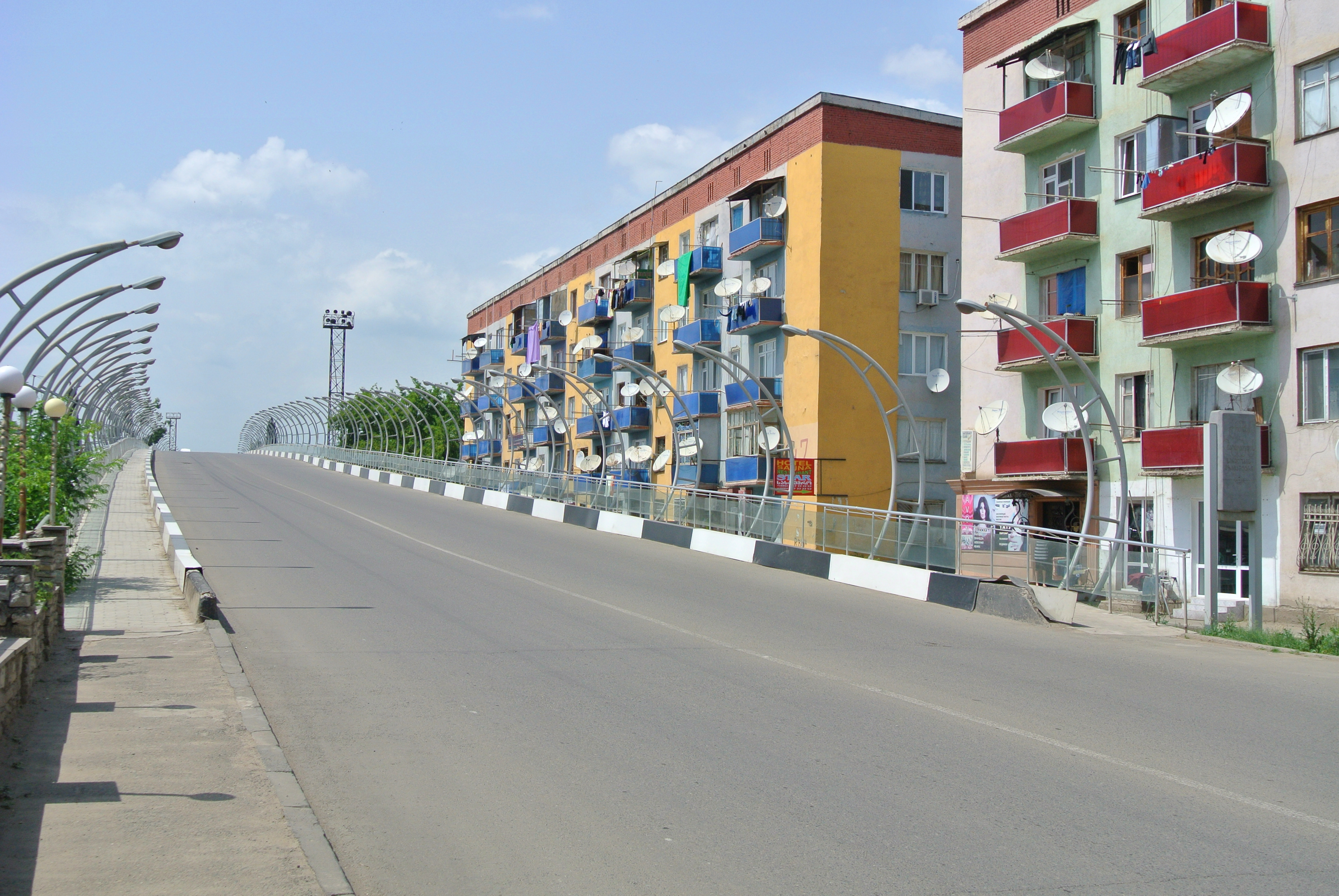
- Marneuli Tea House Imam Hussein Mosque St George Church Marneuli Main Street

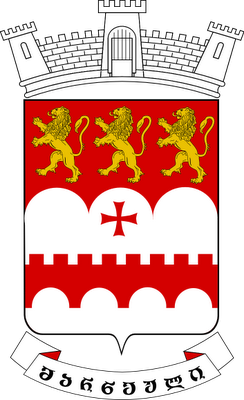
- Flag Seal
- Interactive map of Marneuli
- Location within Georgia Location within Kvemo Kartli
- Coordinates: 41°29′49″N 44°48′39″E
- Country: Georgia (country)
- Mkhare: Kvemo Kartli
- Municipality: Marneuli
- Elevation: 420 m (1,380 ft)

Population (January 1, 2024)
  - Total: 25,742
- Climate: Cfa

Marneuli (Georgian: მარნეული [maɾne.uli], Azerbaijani: Sarvan) is a city in the Kvemo Kartli region of southern Georgia and administrative center of Marneuli Municipality that borders neighboring Azerbaijan and Armenia.

== Toponymy ==
According to Georgian sources, the name Marneuli is of Georgian origin and some have attested the name to "marani" (Georgian: მარანი), the Georgian word "winery".

The name used by the Azerbaijanis to refer to the city, Sarvan, The word was borrowed from Persian sârebân (Persian: ساربان), meaning "the keeper of camels".

== Geography ==
Marneuli is located on the banks of the Algeti river, 20 km south of the capital Tbilisi and nearing the northern borders of both Armenia and Azerbaijan. It has a moderately warm steppe climate, with moderately cold winters and hot summers. The city is located on the S6 highway leading to Vanadzor in Armenia, and has a railway station on the Tbilisi-Yerevan line.

== Demographics ==
According to the 2014 Georgian census the population of the city was 20,211. The city is predominantly populated by Georgian Azerbaijanis (83,1%). As of January 1, 2023, the population was 24,928.

Historical population
| Year | Pop. | ±% p.a. |
|---|---|---|
| 1989 | 27,118 | — |
| 2002 | 20,065 | −2.29% |
| 2014 | 20,211 | +0.06% |
| 2024 | 25,742 | +2.45% |
Source: Population data (1989 and 2002) and 2014

== History ==
Marneuli is the center of the Marneuli Municipality of Georgia. By the decree of the Georgian SSR of March 18, 1947, the village of Borchalo was renamed into Marneuli. It received the status of a city in 1964.

On July 1, 1625, north of Marneuli near the Algeti River on the Marabda field, a major battle of Georgian troops with the Safavid conquerors took place, the Georgian army under the command of Giorgi Saakadze at first almost defeated the Iranian army of Isa Khan, but then it was still defeated and the Iranians entered Tbilisi.

On December 19, 1918, a battle of the Georgian-Armenian War took place near the Khrami River (8 kilometers south of the regional center). As a result of the armistice established on January 1 at the insistence of the British army, which occupied the location of the German army in the region (after the latter was defeated in the First World War), the city remained in the Georgian-Armenian neutral zone, and was subsequently incorporated into Georgian SSR.

In 1921, Marneuli again became the center of military operations - units of the Soviet 11th Army marched through it in Tbilisi during the Soviet-Georgian war.

On August 8, 2008, during the Russo-Georgian War, Russian planes bombed the city's airfield, as a result of which 3 people died and the airfield's runway was destroyed.

== Culture ==
There is one university branch (Tbilisi State University) and one university opened in 2008 (Heydar Aliyev Georgia-Azerbaijan Humanitarian University) in Marneuli.

== Gallery ==
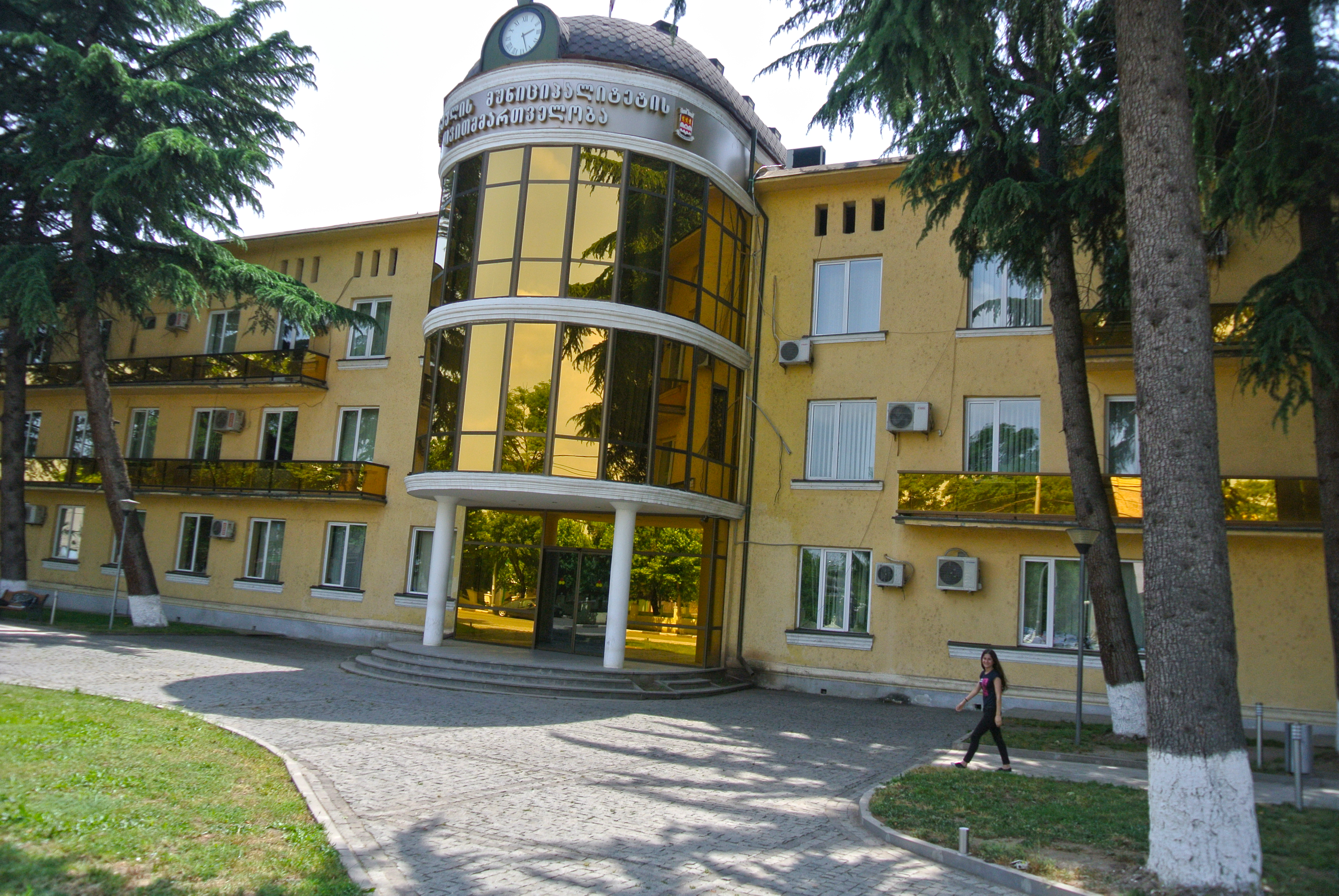
Building of the Marneuli Municipality government

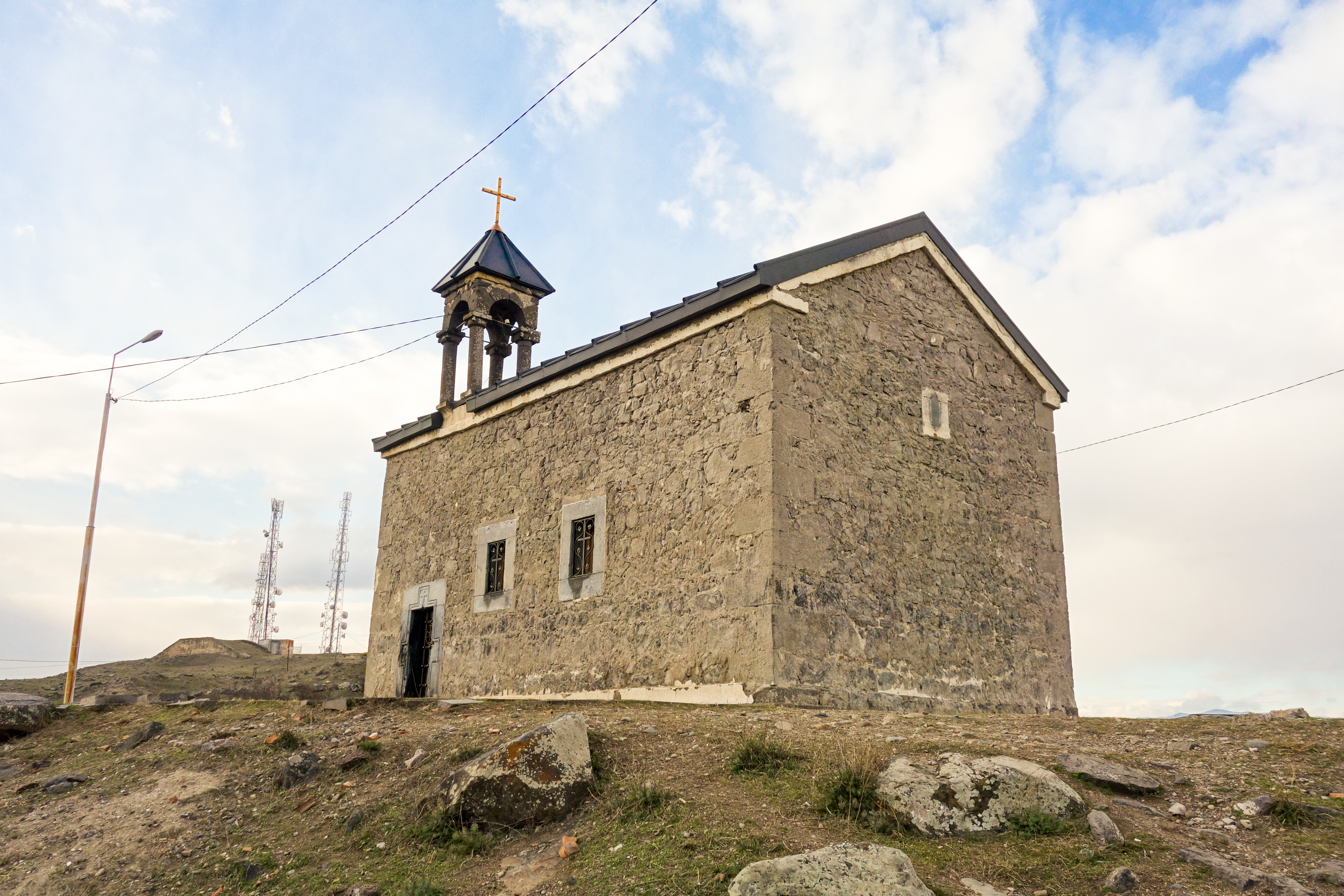
St. George Church in Marneuli

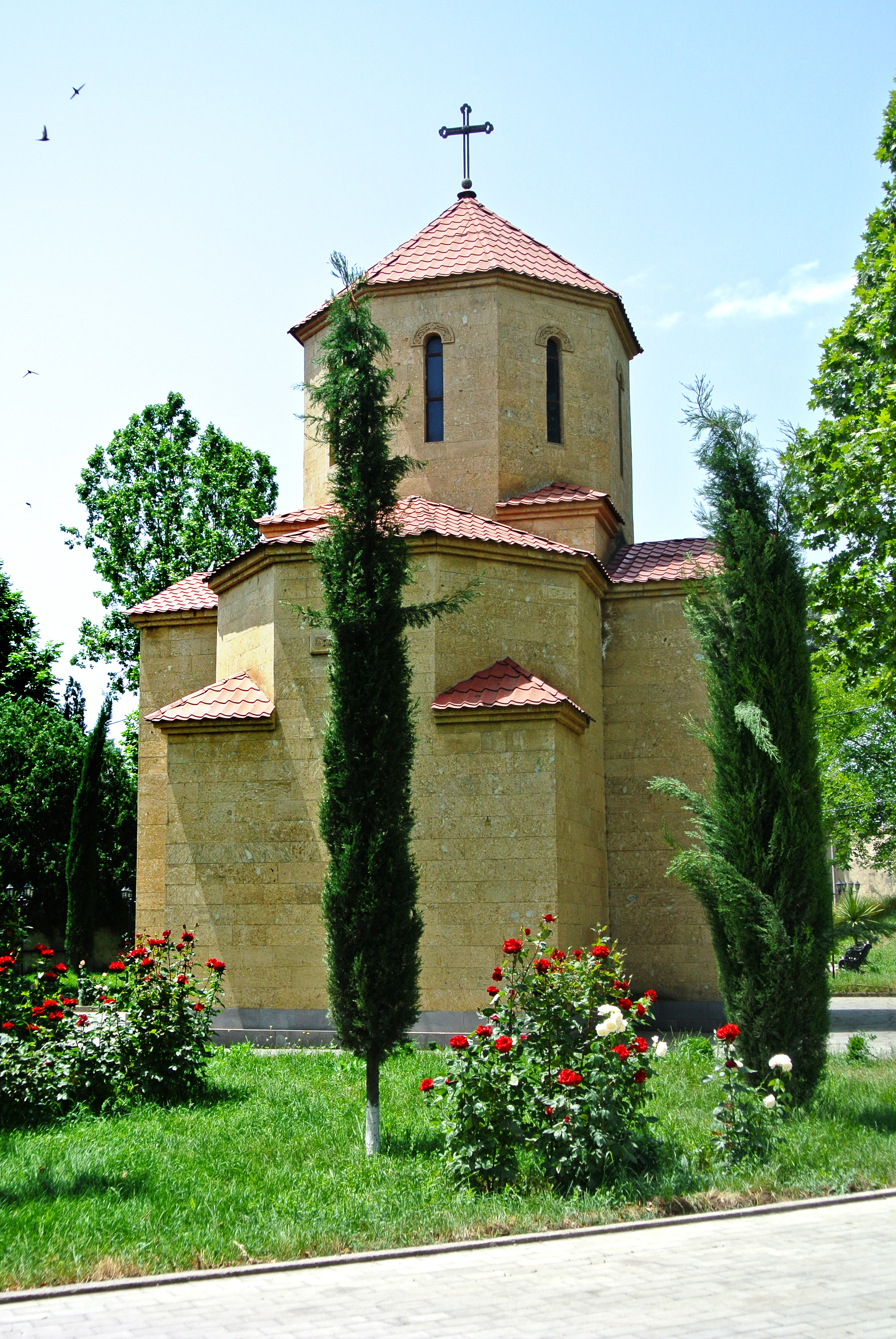
Vakhtang Gorgasali Church

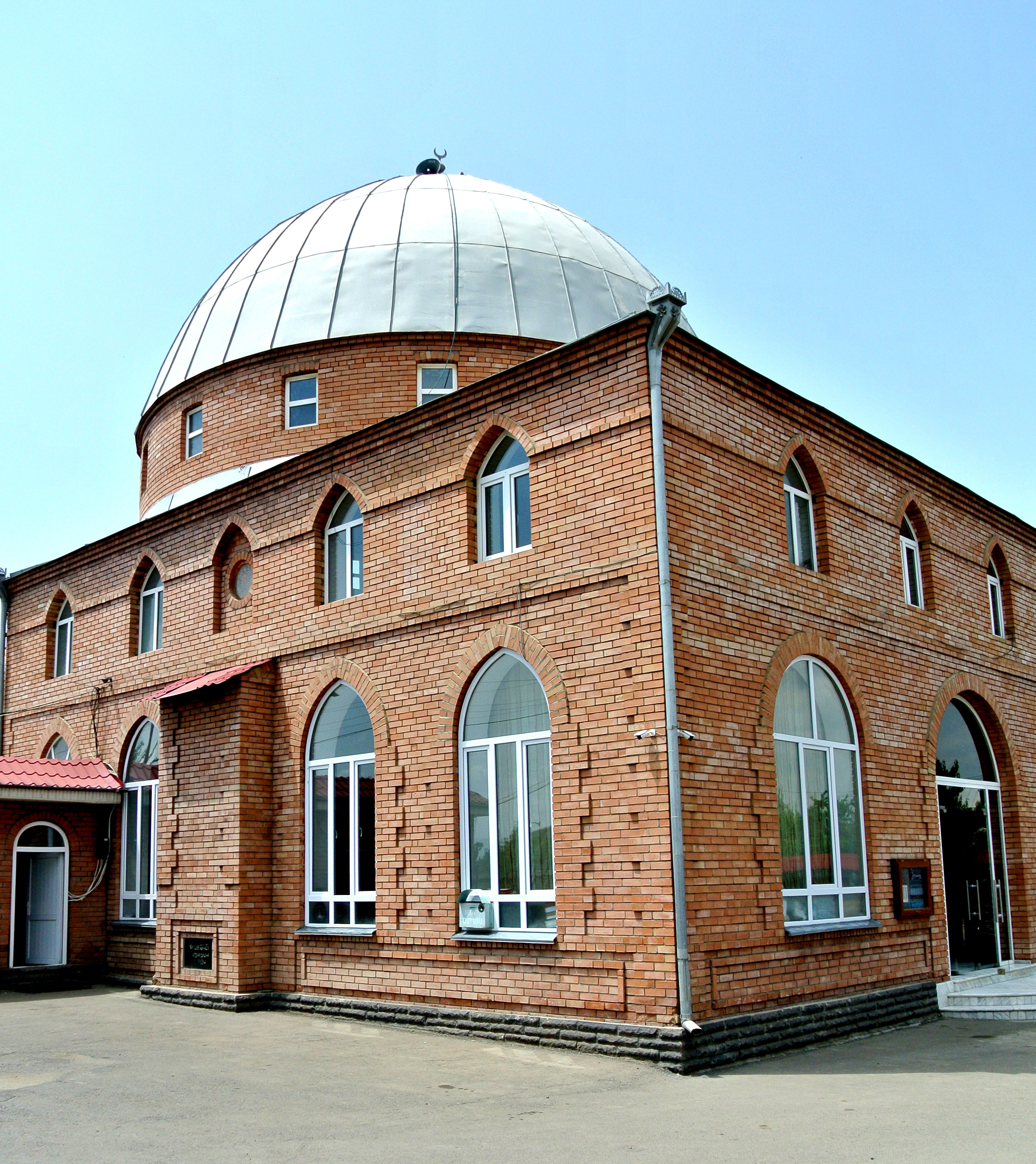
Marneuli Imam Ali Mosque

== See also ==
- Azerbaijanis in Georgia
- Marneuli Municipality
- Kvemo Kartli
