= Birtvisi Natural Monument =

Protected natural monument in Georgia

- ბირთვისის ბუნების ძეგლი
- IUCN category III (natural monument or feature)
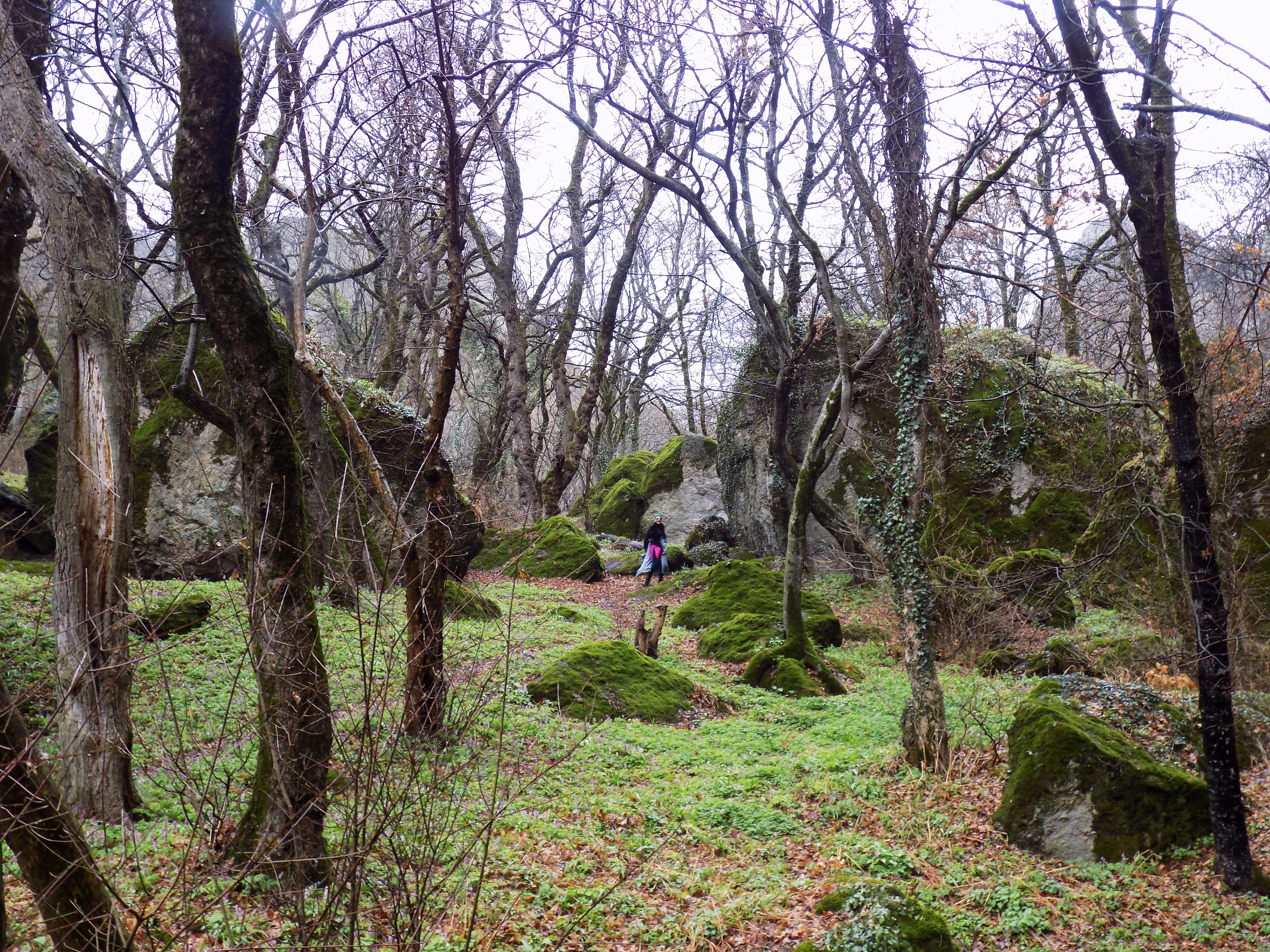
- Rocky landscape of Birtvisi Natural Monument
- Interactive map of Birtvisi Natural Monument
- Location: Tetri Tsqaro Municipality, Kvemo Kartli, Georgia
- Nearest town: Tbisi (village)
- Coordinates: 41.6089°N 44.5392°E
- Area: 514.8 hectare
- Elevation: 1,110 to 1,400 m (3,640 to 4,590 ft)
- Designation: natural monument
- Authorized: 17 February 2016
- Established: 25 February 2016
- Visitors: c. 10,000 (in 2019)
- Governing body: Agency of Protected Areas of Georgia
- Administrator: Algeti National Park Administration
- Website: Official website
- WDPA ID: 555624300

Birtvisi Natural Monument (Georgian: ბირთვისის ბუნების ძეგლი) is an IUCN Category III protected rocky massif in Tetritsqaro Municipality, in the Kvemo Kartli region of Georgia. It is situated on the southern slopes of the Trialeti Range, near the villages of Tbisi and Partskhisi, at elevations of 1,110 to 1,400 m (3,640 to 4,590 ft) above sea level.

The monument covers 514.8 ha (5.148 km^{2}; 1,272 acres) and is registered in the World Database on Protected Areas under site ID 555624300. The area is also referred to in official government and tourism materials as Birtvisi Canyon.

== Geology and hydrology ==
Birtvisi has a strongly dissected surface formed by complexes of rocky outcrops, deep ravines and pointed, near-vertical rock pillars. The resistant underlying strata consist primarily of Eocene porphyrites and tuff breccias, which form rocky massifs, ridges, exposed summits and a labyrinth-like mountain landscape. Gentler slopes are forested, while comparatively open and dry areas support sparse vegetation and rock-dwelling xerophytes.

The management plan identifies the unusual exposed rock pillars, deep canyons and their integration with the remains of Birtvisi Fortress as the principal landscape value of the natural monument.

The monument is crossed by a tributary of the Mokhvrinavi River locally known as Tbiltsqaros Tskali (Georgian: თბილწყაროს წყალი), which joins the Algeti River downstream. The monument also contains the Tbisi ravine and several smaller tributary gullies.

== Ecology and conservation ==
The Agency of Protected Areas describes Birtvisi as an outermost outpost of Colchic flora in the Lesser Caucasus.

Mixed and deciduous woodland within Birtvisi includes the Georgian maple (Acer ibericum), which the protected-areas management plan classifies as a nationally vulnerable relict species. The species is specifically recorded in the Birtvisi and Samshvilde natural monuments.

The rocky terrain has also been identified as a possible nesting area for the Egyptian vulture (Neophron percnopterus). The management plan states that reliable information about the number of nesting pairs was unavailable and provides for monitoring to determine whether the species continues to nest, or can be confirmed as nesting, within the monument.

The stated purpose of establishing the natural monument was to protect its geological formations, historical artefacts and species included in Georgia's Red List.

== Recreation and access ==
Birtvisi is a popular destination for hikers, school and university excursion groups, and picnickers. The 2020 management plan states that no formal visitor-counting system was operating at the monument, but estimates that approximately 10,000 people visited in 2019, mostly during the summer season.

The customary hiking approach begins near the village of Tbisi. A path between two rock formations, known as the “Devi's Footprint”, leads towards the principal fortress complex. The Agency of Protected Areas identifies the difficulty of reaching the natural and historical features as one of the defining characteristics of the site.

The Georgian Ministry of Environmental Protection and Agriculture reported that a large recreational project in Birtvisi Canyon had been completed by 2025. The project included a visitor centre, viewing platforms, suspension bridges, a swing, cottages, a zipline and the first via ferrata established within Georgia's protected areas.

== Designation and management ==
Birtvisi was added to Georgia's statutory list of natural monuments by Law No. 4735-IIს, adopted on 17 February 2016. The law entered into force upon its publication on 25 February 2016. Its original statutory area was 560.8 ha (5.608 km^{2}; 1,386 acres).

A further amendment adopted in 2018 replaced the original boundary coordinates and established the present area of 514.8 ha (5.148 km^{2}; 1,272 acres).

Birtvisi Natural Monument is administered by the Algeti National Park Administration, a territorial unit of the Agency of Protected Areas of Georgia. A management plan approved by the Georgian government in 2020 jointly covers Algeti National Park, Birtvisi Natural Monument, Dashbashi Canyon Natural Monument and Samshvilde Canyon Natural Monument.

== Birtvisi Fortress ==
The rocky landscape contains the ruins of Birtvisi Fortress, whose location among inaccessible rocks formed an important part of its defensive system. The fortress is first recorded in historical sources in the 11th century.

Its surviving remains include defensive, residential and utility structures, a water reservoir, a gateway and the observation tower known as Sheupovari.

The Agency of Protected Areas identifies the combination of natural formations, medieval buildings and rock-cut steps as one of the distinguishing characteristics of the natural monument.

== See also ==
- Algeti National Park
- Birtvisi Fortress
- List of protected areas of Georgia
- Trialeti Range
