= Samshvilde Canyon Natural Monument =

- IUCN category III (natural monument or feature)
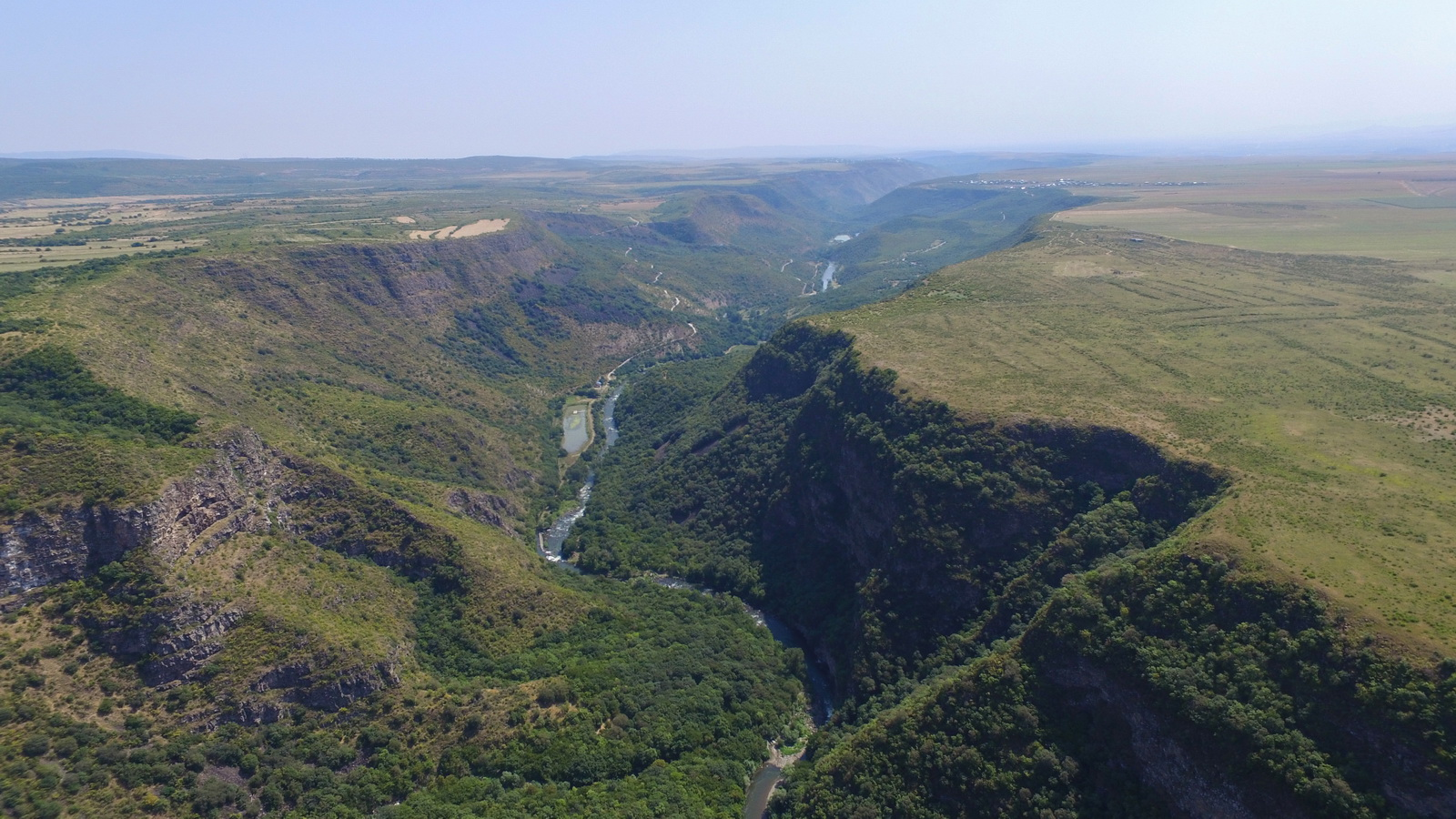
- Samshvilde canyon.

- Location within Georgia Location within Kvemo Kartli
- Location: Georgia
- Nearest city: Tetritskaro, Manglisi
- Coordinates: 41°30′21.5″N 44°30′59.2″E
- Area: 7.23 km^{2} (2.79 sq mi)
- Established: 2013
- Governing body: Agency of Protected Areas
- Website: სამშვილდის კანიონის ბუნების ძეგლი

Samshvilde Canyon Natural Monument (Georgian: სამშვილდის კანიონი) is part of the Khrami gorge in the Kvemo Kartli region of southeastern Georgia. Historically, it has served as a natural defense for the Samshvilde fortress, located at the confluence of the Khrami and Chivchavi (Chivchava or Chivchivi) rivers near Samshvilde village and the ruins of historic Samshvilde located in Tetritsqaro Municipality, 548-605 meters above sea level. Samshvilde Canyon also includes part of the Chivchav (Chivchava) gorge in the same location, since historically, it also was part of the natural defenses of the Samshvilde fortress.

== Morphology ==
Samshvilde Canyon was created by erosion in a volcanic plateau. Samshvilde Canyon is about 5–6 km long in the middle part of the Khrami River valley, and a 3–4 km long in the Chivchav River valley. The depth of the Samshvilde Canyon is 300 meters on average. The ruins of fortress Samshvilde, which the canyon is named after, stands on a naturally fortified cape at the confluence of the Khrami and Chychavka rivers and offers magnificent views of the canyon. Samshvilde Canyon features the intrusive rocks of a stripped quartz-porphyry, which, as a result of its depletion, splits into a beautifully folded bi-pyramidal crystals of magmatic quartz. These quartz crystals are a truly remarkable natural feature of this canyon.

== See also ==
- Samshvilde
- Algeti National Park
