= Samshvilde (village) =

Samshvilde სამშვილდე
- Village
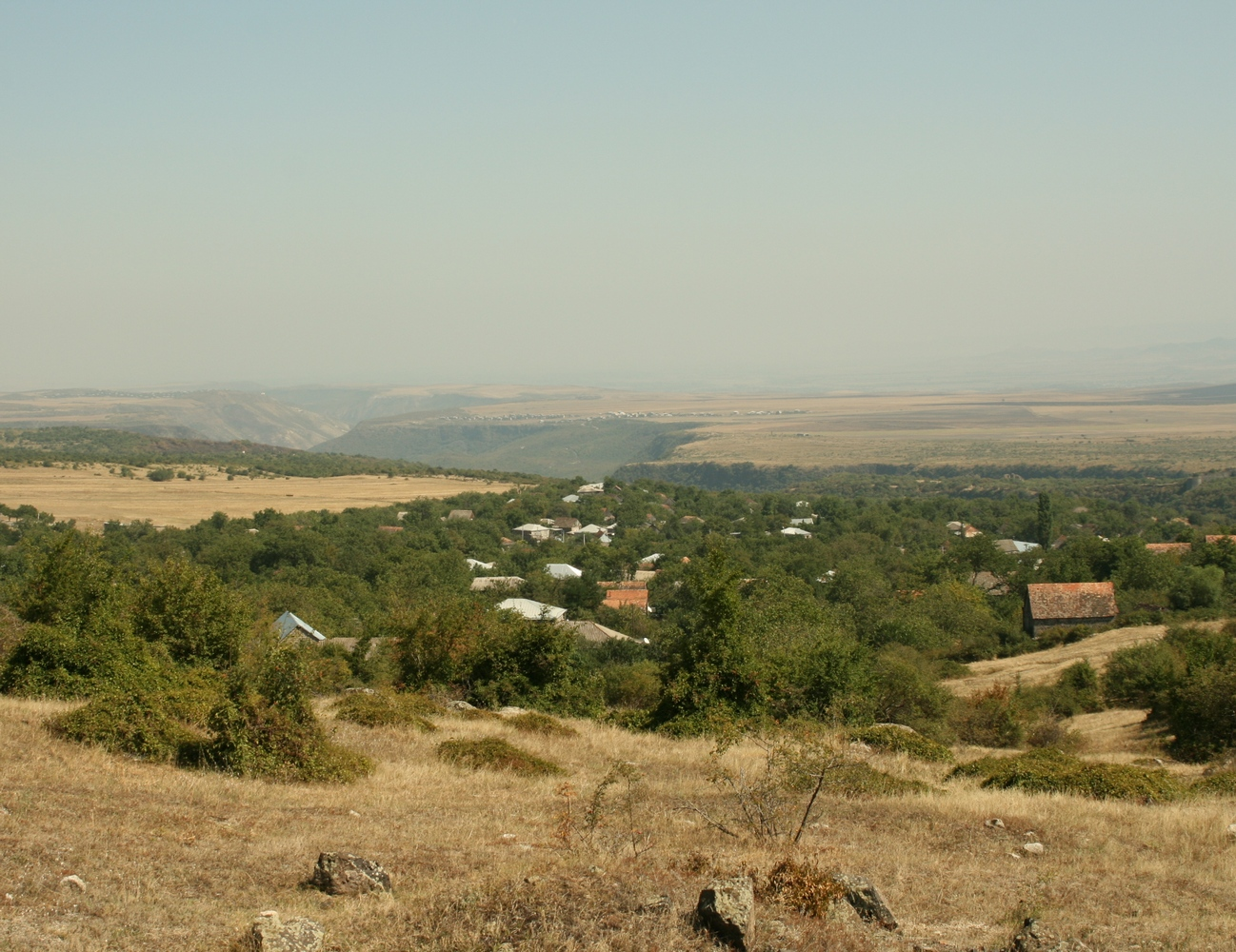
- Samshvilde in 2010

- Location of Samshvilde
- Coordinates: 41°30′58″N 44°29′27″E
- Country: Georgia
- Region: Kvemo Kartli
- Municipality: Tetritsqaro
- Elevation: 860 m (2,820 ft)

Population (2014)
  - Total: 443

Samshvilde (Georgian: სამშვილდე, Armenian: Սամշվիլդե, also Շամշուլդա, Shamshulda) is a village in the Tetritsqaro Municipality, Kvemo Kartli, Georgia. It is located 4 km south of the town of Tetritsqaro and 2 km north of the ruins of the medieval town of Samshvilde. The village was founded by a group of Armenians in the early 16th century and named after the nearby historical locale.

The environs of the village, on the middle Khrami River, are a protected area as the Samshvilde Canyon Natural Monument.

== Population ==
As of the 2014 national census, Samshvilde had a population of 443, mostly (98%) ethnic Armenians.

Population	2002 census	2014 census
Total	878	443
