= Enageti =

Village in Tetritskaro Municipality, Georgia

Coordinates: 41°36′N 44°38′E

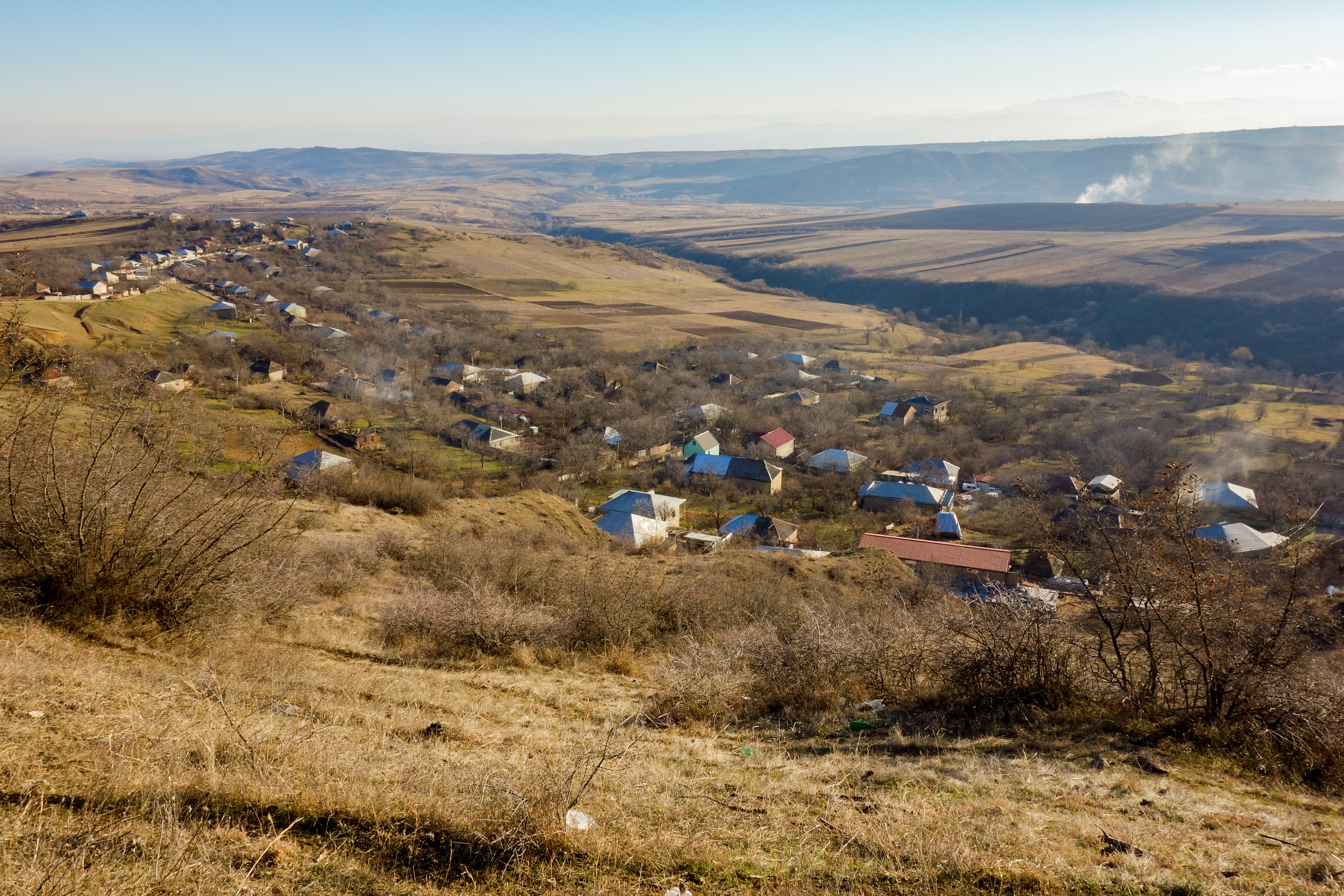
View of Enageti Village

Enageti (Georgian: ენაგეთი) is a village in Tetri Tskaro district in Kvemo Kartli region, Georgia. It is located south of the Trialeti Range.

== See also ==
- Kvemo Kartli
