= Algeti National Park =

National park in Georgia

- IUCN category II (national park)
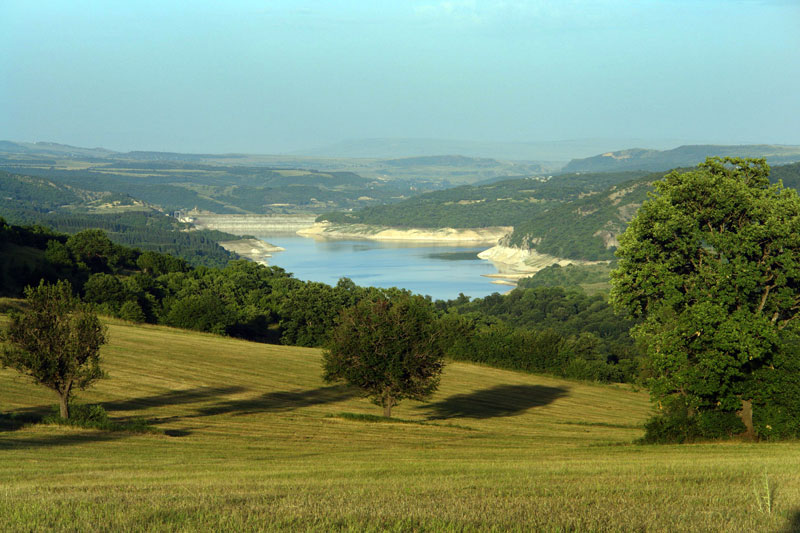
- Landscape around the Algeti reservoir

- Location within Georgia Location within Kvemo Kartli
- Location: Georgia
- Nearest city: Manglisi
- Coordinates: 41°43′N 44°19′E
- Area: 157.63 km^{2} (60.86 sq mi)
- Established: 2007
- Visitors: 8,030 (in 2015)
- Governing body: Agency of Protected Areas
- Website: Algeti National Park

The Algeti National Park (Georgian: ალგეთის ეროვნული პარკი, algetis erovnuli parki) is a protected area in Georgia, in the southeast of the country. It lies in the region of Kvemo Kartli, within the Municipality of Tetritsqaro, some 60 km southwest of the nation's capital, Tbilisi.

The national park stretches along the upper Algeti valley at the woody southern slopes of the eastern Trialeti Range, with the highest point being Mount Kldekari at 2,000 m above sea level. The park was founded under the Soviet government in 1965 as a state reserve to protect the easternmost limits of the Caucasian Spruce and Nordmann Fir. In 2007, it was reorganized into a national park.

Unfortunately, the river has faced many ecological problems including heavy pollution with ammonium compounds, sulfates, phenols, copper compounds, and oil products along with domestic waste. The river becomes especially polluted after reaching the village of Koda.

== See also ==
- Tsalka Canyon Natural Monument
- Birtvisi
- Manglisi Cathedral
