= Tsalka Canyon =

Canyon in Georgia

Tsalka (Dashbashi) Canyon
- Tsalka Canyon, Ktsia gorge
- IUCN category III (natural monument or feature)
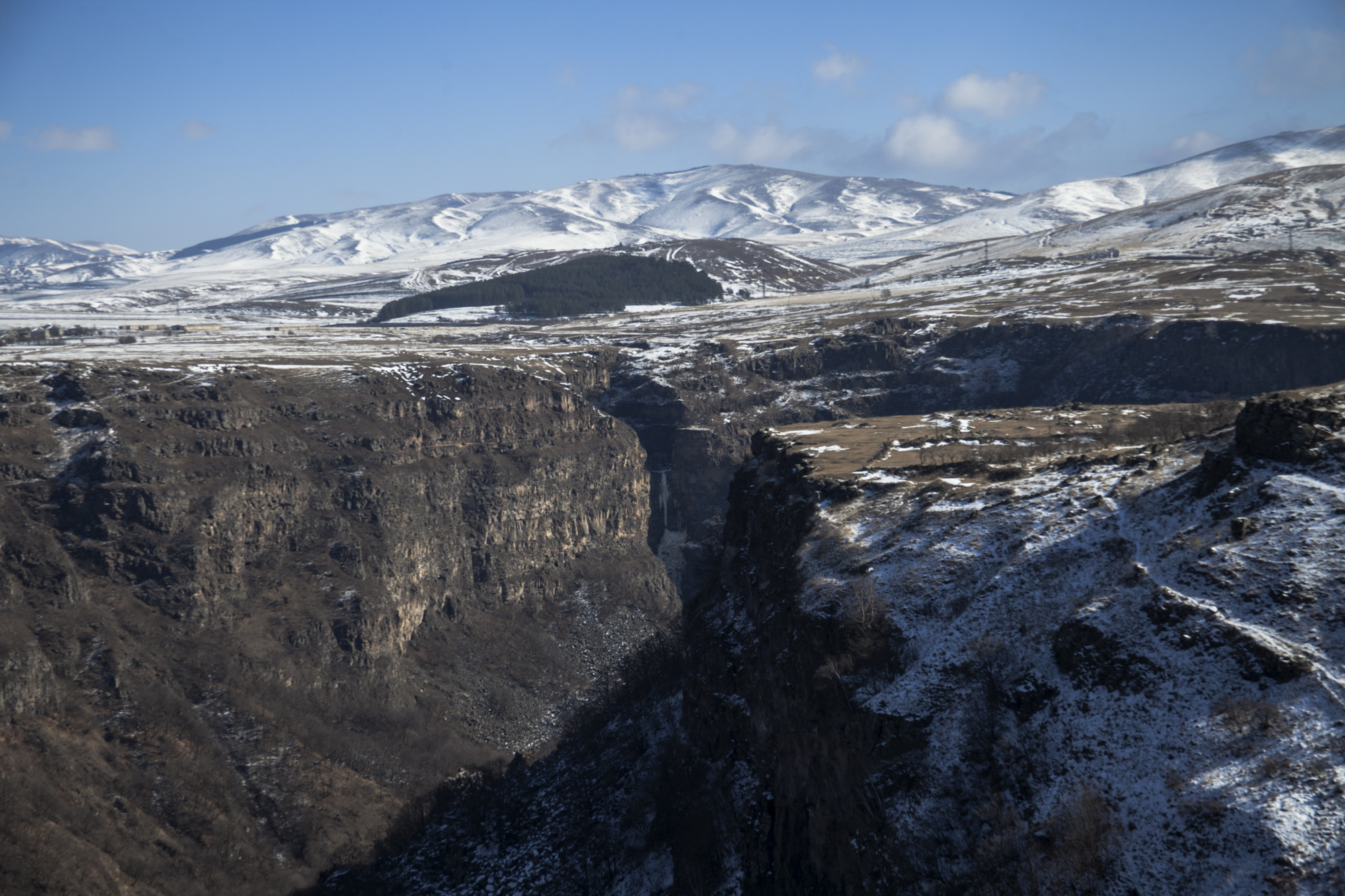
- Tsalka (Dashbashi) canyon

- Location within Kvemo Kartli Location within Georgia
- Interactive map of Tsalka (Dashbashi) Canyon
- Location: Georgia
- Nearest city: Tsalka
- Coordinates: 41°35′39.1″N 44°07′27.5″E
- Area: 9.63 km^{2} (3.72 sq mi)
- Established: 2013
- Governing body: Agency of Protected Areas
- Website: Tsalka Canyon Natural Monument

Tsalka Canyon (Georgian: წალკის კანიონი) is part of Khrami (known as Ktsia at its source) gorge near Dashbashi village, 3 km from the small town of Tsalka, in Tsalka Municipality, in Kvemo Kartli region of southeastern Georgia, 1,110-1,448 meters above sea level. The distance from Tsalka Canyon to the popular Algeti National Park is 42 km.

== Morphology ==
Tsalka Canyon was created by erosion in a volcanic plateau. The canyon is about 7 km long, as measured from canyon beginning at elevation 1448 meters above sea level (41°36.235′N 44°06.685′E) to the end at elevation 1110 meters above sea level (41°33.458′N 44°07.262′E). Canyon depth is 300 meters on average.

== Biodiversity ==
The vegetation on volcanic plateau, where canyon formed, is rather sparse in stark contrast with the different micro-landscape in the canyon. Variety of plants on the steep slopes of the canyon and waterfalls is supported by characteristic micro-climate.

== Tourist attractions ==
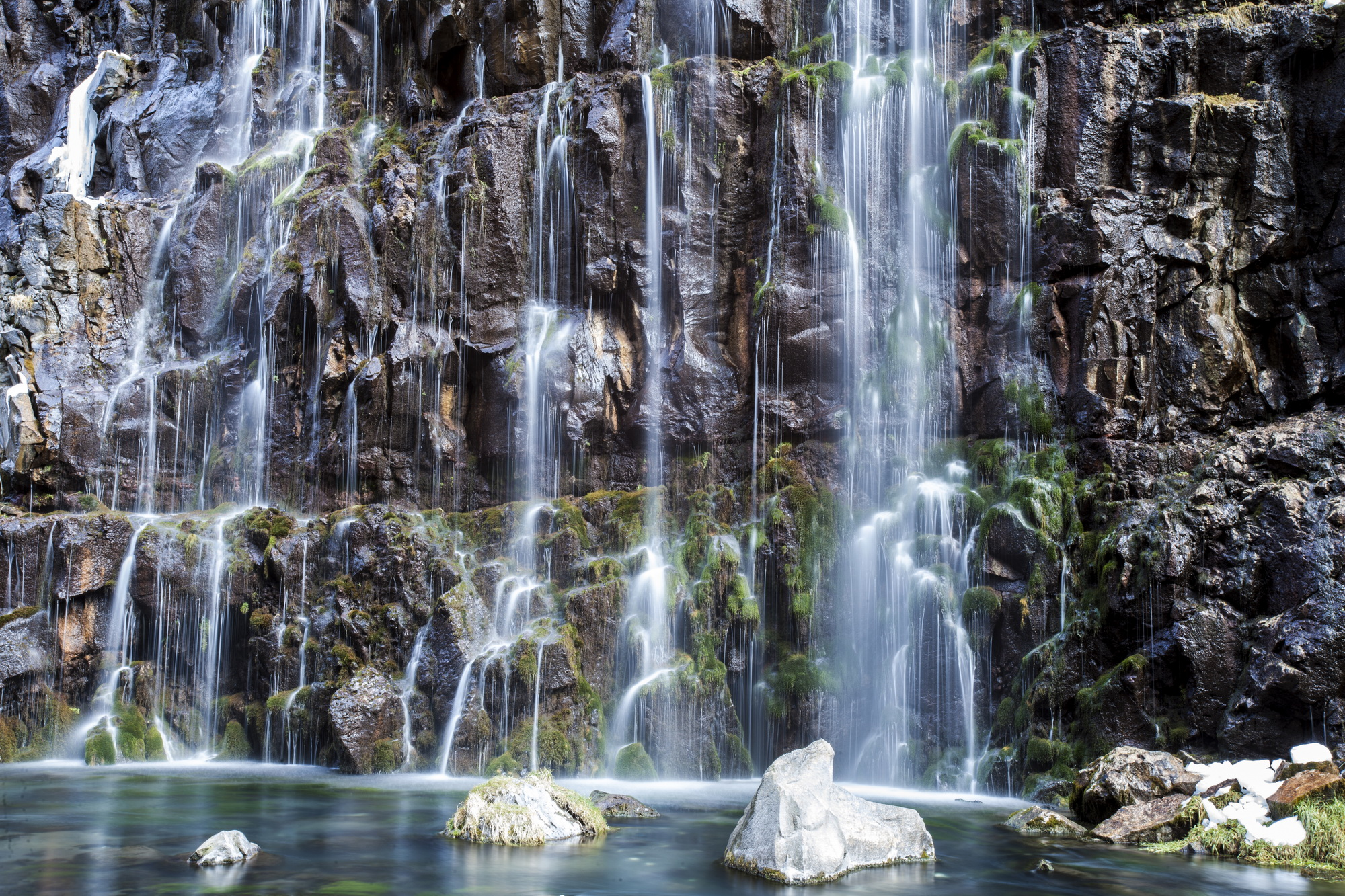
Dashbashi Waterfall, situated at the bottom of Dashbashi Canyon.

Tsalka Canyon is known for its astounding cascading waterfalls that provide chill in the summer. Tsalka Waterfall takes an exotic emerald color and forms dozens of frozen waterfalls in the winter. In the vicinity of the waterfall it is also warmer in the winter than in nearby Tsalka and Dashbashi village. On the way to canyon through Tsalka there are ruins of medieval Kldekari fortress, the center of resistance of Kldekari principals against Georgian kings.

The Diamond Bridge spans 240m across, suspended 280m above the canyon.

== See also ==
- Samshvilde Canyon Natural Monument
- Algeti National Park
- Kldekari (mountain)
- Kldekari-Rkoni Monastery
- List of natural monuments of Georgia
