= Birtvisi Fortress =

Medieval fortress in Georgia

- ბირთვისის ციხე
- Birtvisi Natural Monument, Tetritsqaro Municipality, Kvemo Kartli, Georgia
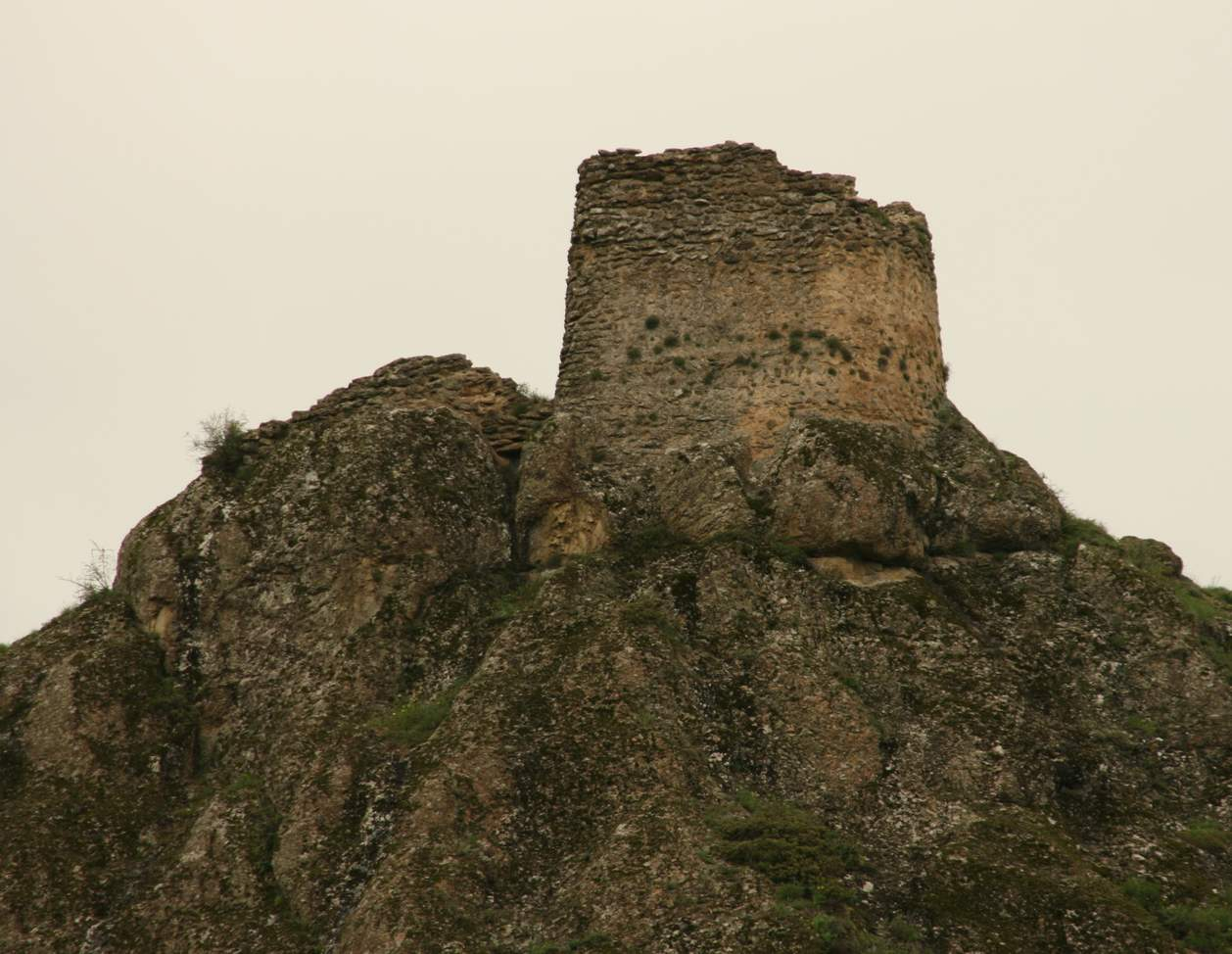
- Sheupovari tower in 2011

Site information
- Type: Fortress
- Open to the public: Yes
- Condition: Ruined

Location
- Location within Kvemo Kartli Location within Georgia
- Coordinates: 41°36′32″N 44°32′21″E

Site history
- Built: 10th century

Immovable Cultural Monument of National Significance of Georgia
- Official name: ბირთვისის ციხე
- Designated: November 7, 2006
- Reference no.: 1772
- Item number in the Cultural Heritage Portal: 6613
- Date of entry in the registry: October 3, 2007

Birtvisi Fortress (Georgian: ბირთვისის ციხე), commonly known as Birtvisi (ბირთვისი), is a ruined medieval fortress within the Birtvisi Natural Monument in Tetritsqaro Municipality, Kvemo Kartli, Georgia. It occupies a naturally defensible rocky massif on the southern slopes of the Trialeti Range, near the villages of Tbisi and Partskhisi. The medieval structures, defensive walls and rock-cut steps form part of the natural and historical complex protected by the natural monument.

== Description ==
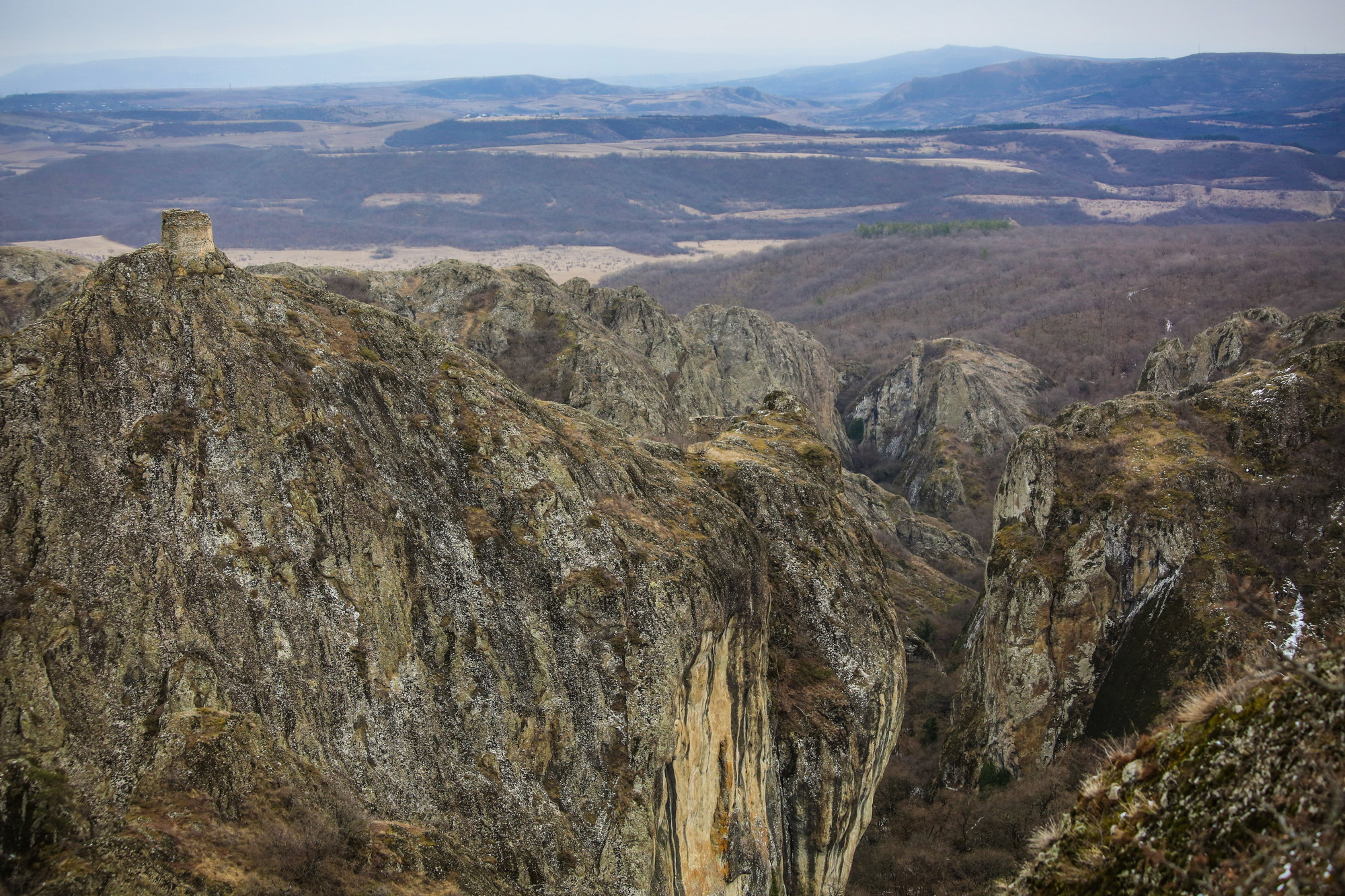
Birtvisi Canyon, with the Sheupovari tower on top of a rock

Birtvisi is a naturally fortified rocky complex covering approximately 1 km^{2} (0.39 sq mi). Inaccessible cliffs and narrow passages were supplemented by defensive walls, towers and a gateway that controlled access to the interior. The surrounding massif consists primarily of Eocene porphyrites and tuff breccias.

The surviving remains include defensive, residential and utility buildings, a reservoir and several towers. The most prominent tower, known as Sheupovari (Georgian: შეუპოვარი, “Obstinate” or “Dauntless”), stands on the highest rock in the complex. Various ancillary structures, including an aqueduct, have also survived.

One of the customary approaches to the fortress begins near the village of Tbisi. A path through a rock passage known as the “Devi's Footprint” leads towards the main fortress complex.

== History ==
The date of the fortress's construction is unknown. In written sources, Birtvisi is first mentioned as a possession of the Arab amir of Tiflis, from whom it was taken by the Georgian nobles Liparit, Duke of Kldekari, and Ivane Abazasdze in 1038. In medieval Georgia, Birtvisi had a reputation as an impregnable stronghold whose holder could control the strategically important Algeti valley.

The Turco-Mongol ruler Timur captured the fortress during one of his invasions of Georgia in 1403. His soldiers climbed the cliffs at night using rope ladders and entered the fortifications. The surviving defenders were captured and executed.

Following the fragmentation of the Kingdom of Georgia in the 15th century, Birtvisi lay within the Kingdom of Kartli and belonged to the princely Baratashvili family.

== See also ==
- Birtvisi Natural Monument
- Algeti National Park
