= Algeti =

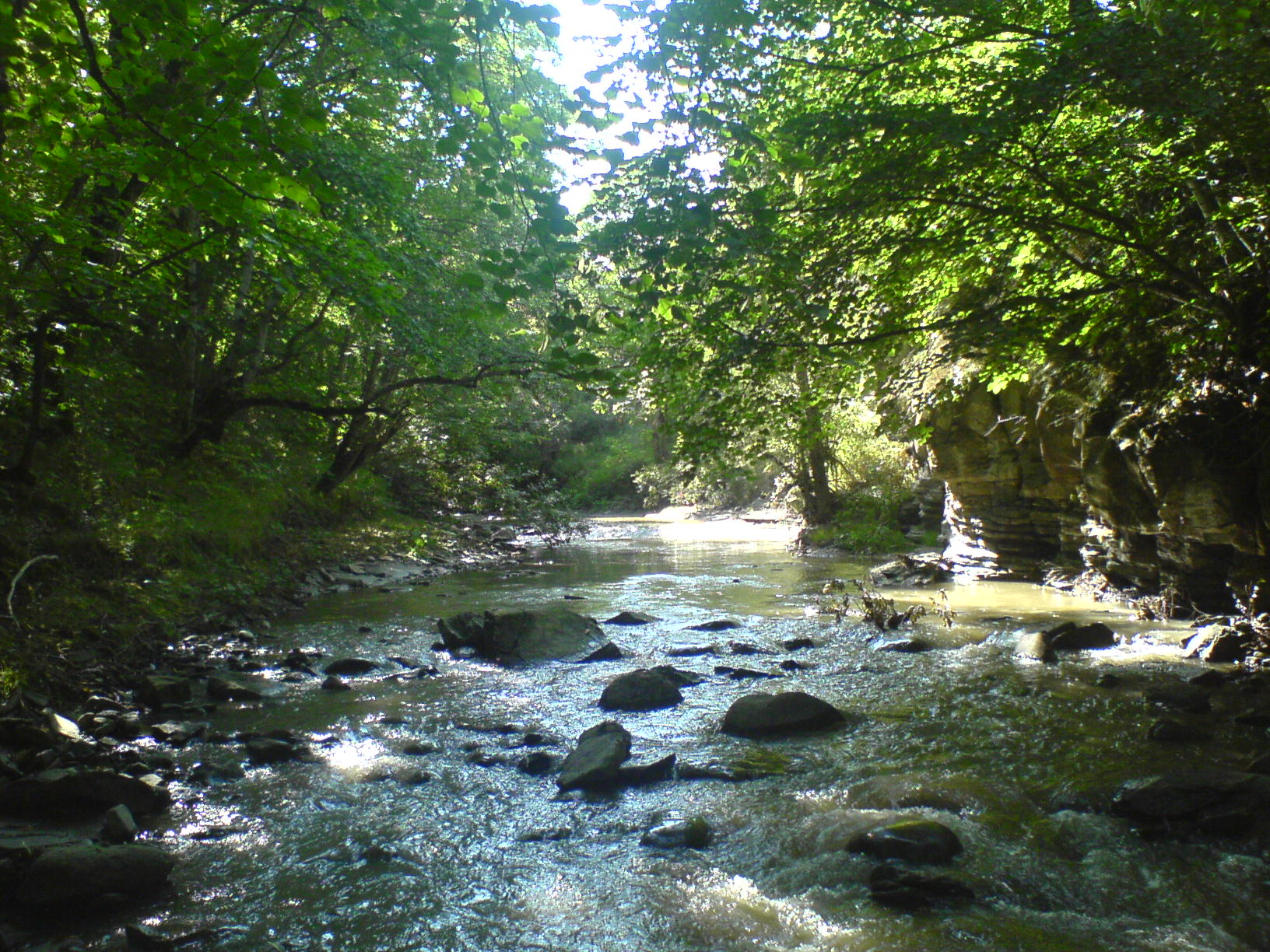
- The Algeti near Manglisi

- Location within Georgia Location within Azerbaijan

Location
- Country: Georgia

Physical characteristics
- Source: the Lesser Caucasus Range
  - coordinates: 41.7113°N 44.2335°E
- Mouth: Mtkvari (Kura)
  - coordinates: 41.3821°N 45.0438°E
- Length: 118 km (73 mi)
- Basin size: 763 km^{2} (295 mi^{2})

Basin features
- Progression: Kura→ Caspian Sea

The Algeti (Georgian: ალგეთი) is a river in Kvemo Kartli, Georgia, spanning the municipalities of Tetritsqaro and Marneuli. It is 118 km (73 mi) long, and has a drainage basin of 763 km^{2} (295 sq mi). Originating at Mount Kldekari, the Algeti flows into a deep rocky valley and then a plain before joining the river Kura as its right tributary. The picturesque landscapes of the Algeti valley have been protected as the Algeti National Park, founded under the Soviet government in 1965 as a state reserve to and reorganized into a national park in 2007.
