= Protected areas of Georgia =

Protected areas of Georgia may refer to:

- Protected areas of Georgia (country)
- Protected areas of Georgia (U.S. state)
