= Manglisi =

Manglisi მანგლისი
- Borough
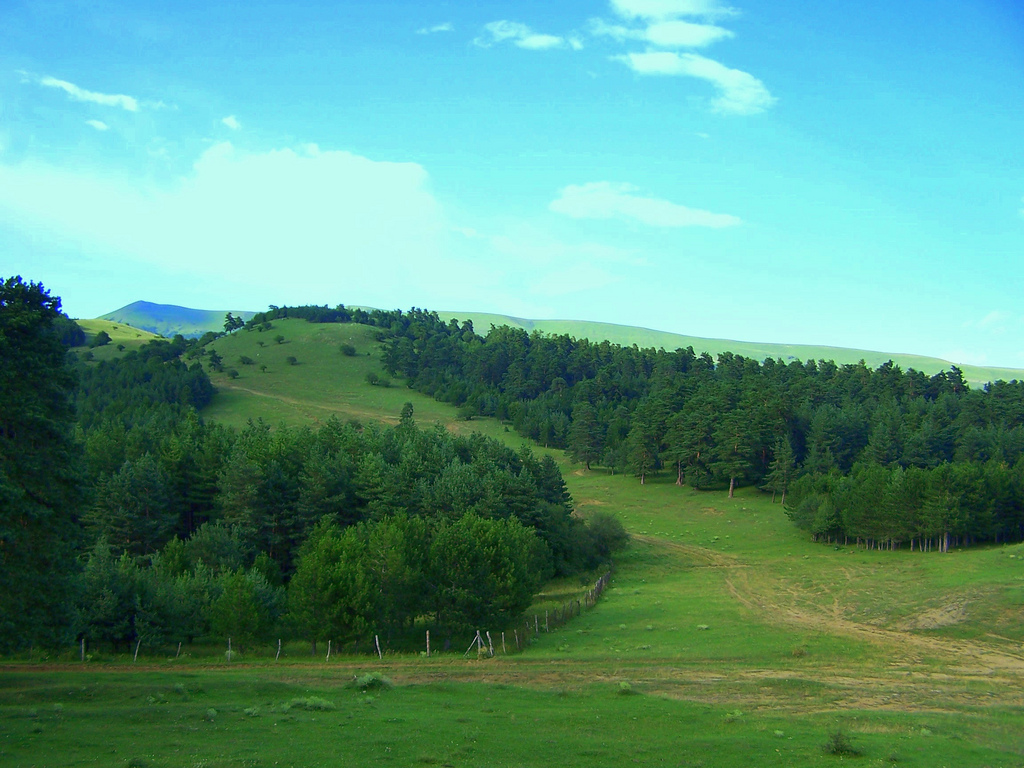
- Environs of Manglisi

- Location in Georgia Manglisi (Kvemo Kartli)
- Coordinates: 41°41′49″N 44°23′04″E
- Country: Georgia
- Region: Kvemo Kartli
- Municipality: Tetritsqaro
- Daba: 1926
- Elevation: 1,200 m (3,900 ft)

Population (2014)
  - Total: 1,441
- Climate: Dfb

Manglisi (Georgian: მანგლისი, pronounced [manɡlisi]) is a daba (townlet) in the Tetritsqaro Municipality, Kvemo Kartli region of Georgia. As of the 2014 census, it had a population of 1,441. With a recorded history going back to the 4th century, Manglisi was one of the earliest centers of Christianity in Georgia and is a home to the medieval cathedral of the Mother of God. It also functions as a mountain spa and health resort.

== Geography and climate ==
Manglisi is located on the southern slopes of the Trialeti Range, on the Tbilisi-Tsalka highway, 56 kilometres (35 mi) west of Tbilisi, the capital of Georgia, in the Algeti river valley. It is located at about 1,200 metres (3,900 ft) above sea level and enjoys a subtropical climate, with warm summers (average temperature in July, 19 °C) and mild winters (average temperature in January, −2 °C). Annual precipitation is 700 mm. Manglisi also functions as a mountain resort.

== Etymology ==
The etymology of "Manglisi" may be related to the Old Georgian mangali, "sickle", ultimately derived from the Syrian maggəlā. The modern Georgian scholar Ketevan Kutateladze has conjectured that, the name of the locality, in the sense of "a crescent", may be a reflection of the Moon cult, an effect of which persisted in the system of religious beliefs of Georgians into the era of Christianity.

== History ==
=== Antiquity and Middle Ages ===
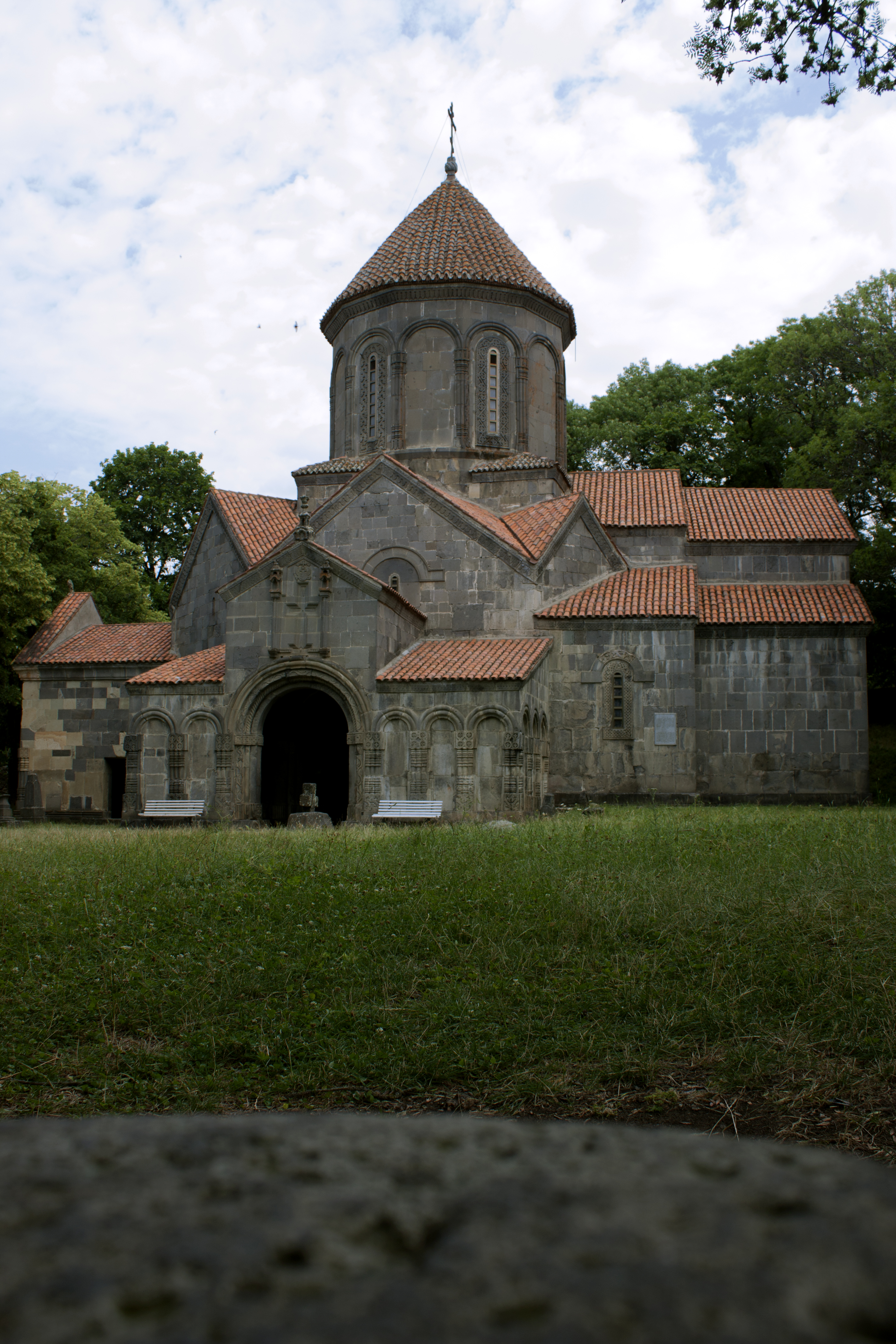
The cathedral of Manglisi

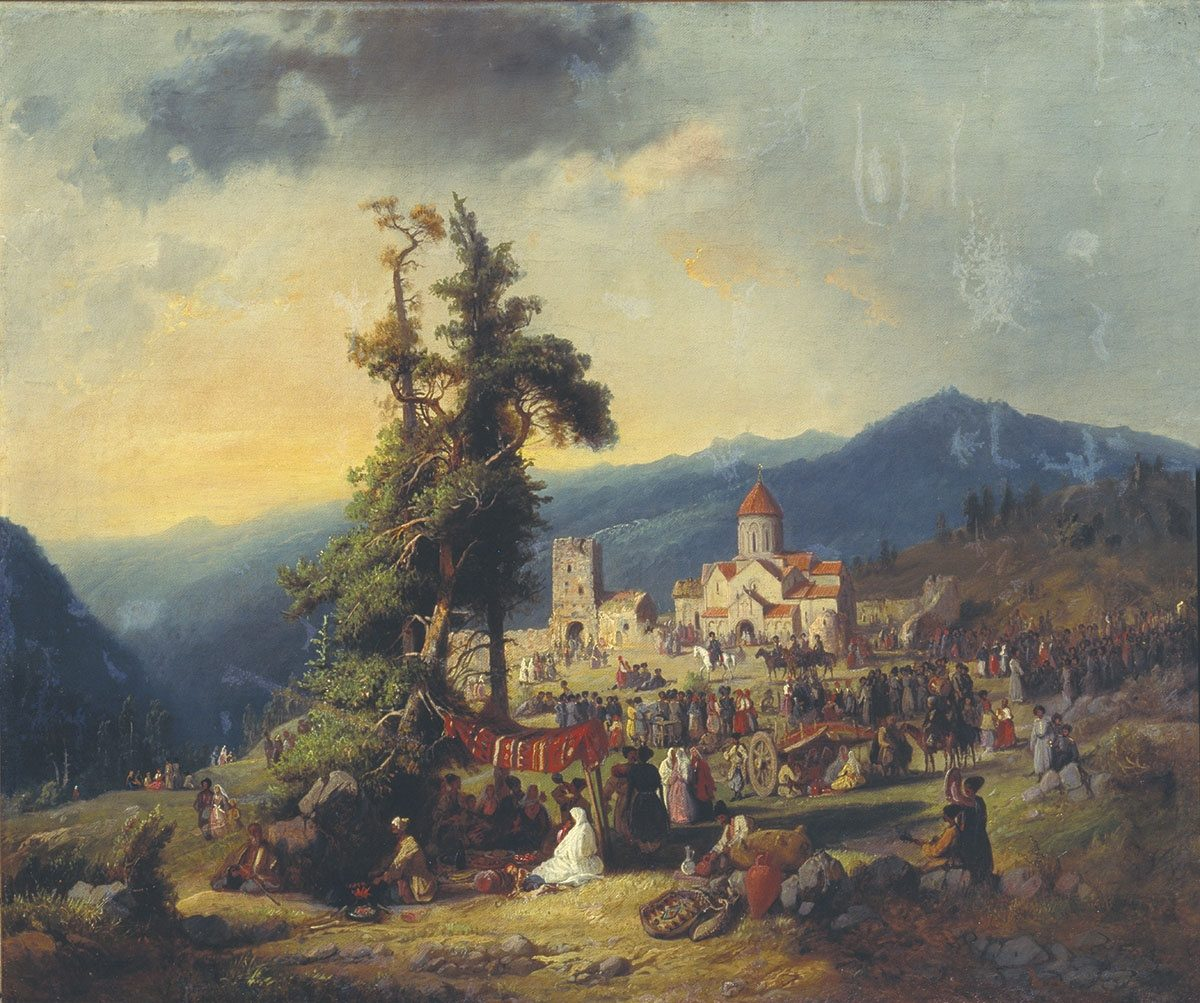
Religious festival in Manglisi. Painting by K. Filippov, c. 1871

In the early Bronze Age, the territory of Manglisi was part of the wider region, home to a kurgan culture. By the early Middle Ages, Manglisi and its environs strategically located on the course of the Algeti river formed a territorial unit known as Manglis-khevi, "the valley of Manglisi".

The Georgian historical tradition makes Manglisi, along with Mtskheta and Erusheti, one of the earliest church establishments in Kartli (Iberia) following King Mirian's conversion to Christianity in the 330s. According to the 11th-century historian Leonti Mroveli, Manglisi was the first place which the bishop John of Kartli, returning from his mission to Constantinople with a group of Byzantine priests and masons, chose to build a Christian church. There, the chronicle continues, he left the relics brought from Constantinople as presents of the emperor Constantine the Great, to the disappointment of King Mirian who wanted to have the relics at his capital, Mtskheta.

Manglisi became a seat of the homonymous bishopric under Vakhtang I in the 5th century. The diocesan territory of Manglisi covered much of the Algeti valley and at times expanded beyond it. The church of Manglisi was also a site of pilgrimage for the neighboring Armenians until the catholicos Abraham of Armenia excommunicated the Georgians following an ecclesiastic schism between the two peoples in 607 and instructed his compatriots not to go on pilgrimage to Mtskheta and Manglisi. Manglisi was dispossessed of its relic, the foot-rest (suppedaneum) of the Lord, by the Byzantine emperor Heraclius who passed through Kartli during his war with Iran in the 620s.

The valley of Manglisi appears in possession of the Juansheriani family, a branch of the former royal dynasty of Chosroids of Iberia, in the middle of the 8th century, and then of the Liparitids, whose one member Rati, a contemporary of Bagrat III (r. 978/1008–1014), is described by the Georgian chronicler to have held "the fortress of Ateni and all Kartli south of the Mtkuari, Trialeti, Manglis-khevi, and Skvireti." At the beginning of the 11th century, the cathedral of Manglisi, originally a tetraconch, was substantially reconstructed and refurbished. In 1121, the field of Didgori, not far from Manglisi, was a scene of the climactic victory of the Georgian king David IV over the Seljuq Turks. After a series of foreign invasions, more so following Timur's campaigns, the valley of Manglisi went into gradual decline. By the 1770s, it had been listed among the emptied eparchies of the Georgian church. The abandoned cathedral still stood there, undisturbed by Georgia's Muslim intruders because, as the 18th-century historian Prince Vakhushti of Kartli claims, they thought one of the frescoes in the church depicted Muhammad seated upon a lion. The fresco is, in fact, an image of St. Mammes of Caesarea.

=== Russian rule ===
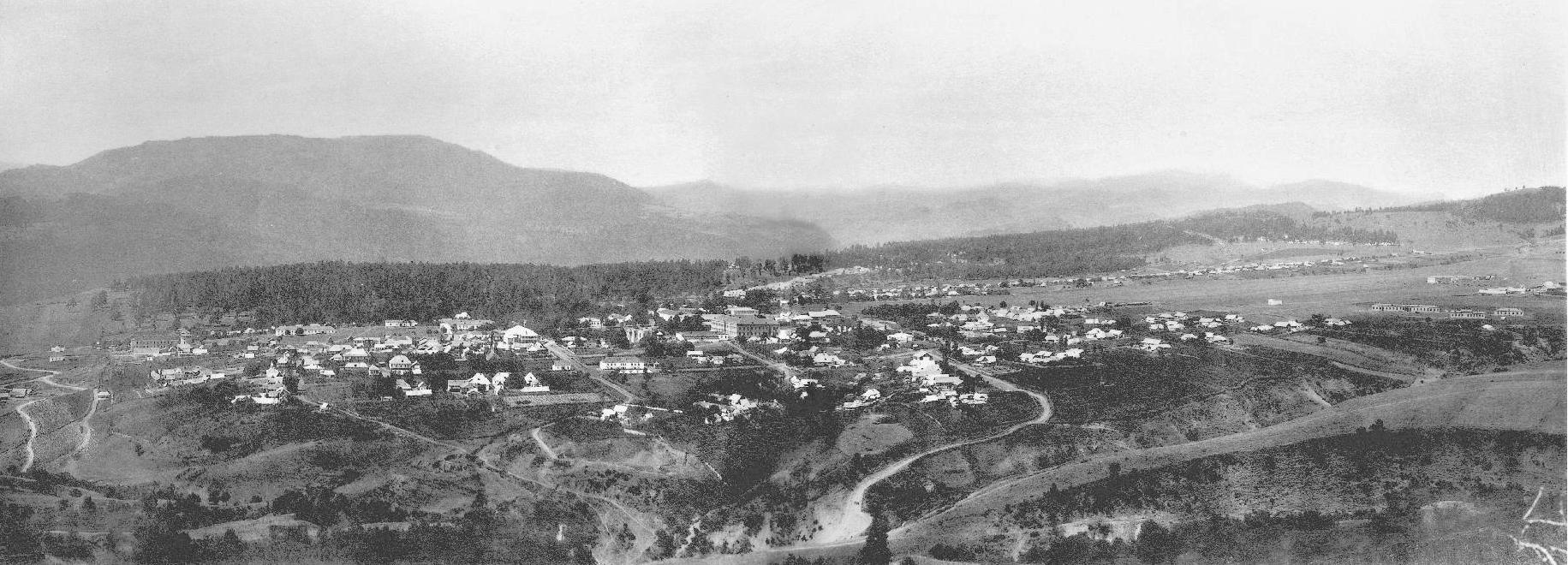
Manglisi in 1892

After the arrival of the Russian rule in Georgia, the depopulated village of Manglisi (Russian: Манглис, Manglis) was chosen, in 1823, by General Aleksey Yermolov as the headquarters of one of the regiments under his command, to be called, after 1827, the 13th Erivansky Grenadier Regiment for its role in the victory at Erivan in the war with Persia. On this occasion, the Russian authorities had also transplanted some civilian families from the neighboring districts. By the early 1850s, Manglis had been a relatively well-organized Russian colony. The old cathedral was also restored from 1851 to 1857. The population, with an overwhelming Slavic majority, was up to 3,000 in 1892. By the early 1890s, Manglis had also acquired a spa town status, where the people of Tiflis (Tbilisi) could escape the city's summer heat.

=== Modern Manglisi ===
During the Soviet period, Manglisi continued to function as a spa and its sanatoriums provided services for people with respiratory diseases. In 1924, the state-run airline Zakavia organized a short-lived line Tiflis—Manglis to serve local tourist interests. On August 29, 1924, the Red Army barracks in Manglisi were raided, ultimately unsuccessfully, by anti-Soviet insurgents led by Kakutsa Cholokashvili.

In 1926, the settlement was granted the status of daba (urban-type settlement). According to the nationwide Georgian census of 2002, Manglisi had a population of 2,752, a 30.1% drop from 3,939 in the last Soviet census of 1989.
