= Tetritsqaro Municipality =

Coordinates: 41°33′N 44°28′E

Tetritskaro Municipality თეთრიწყაროს მუნიციპალიტეტი
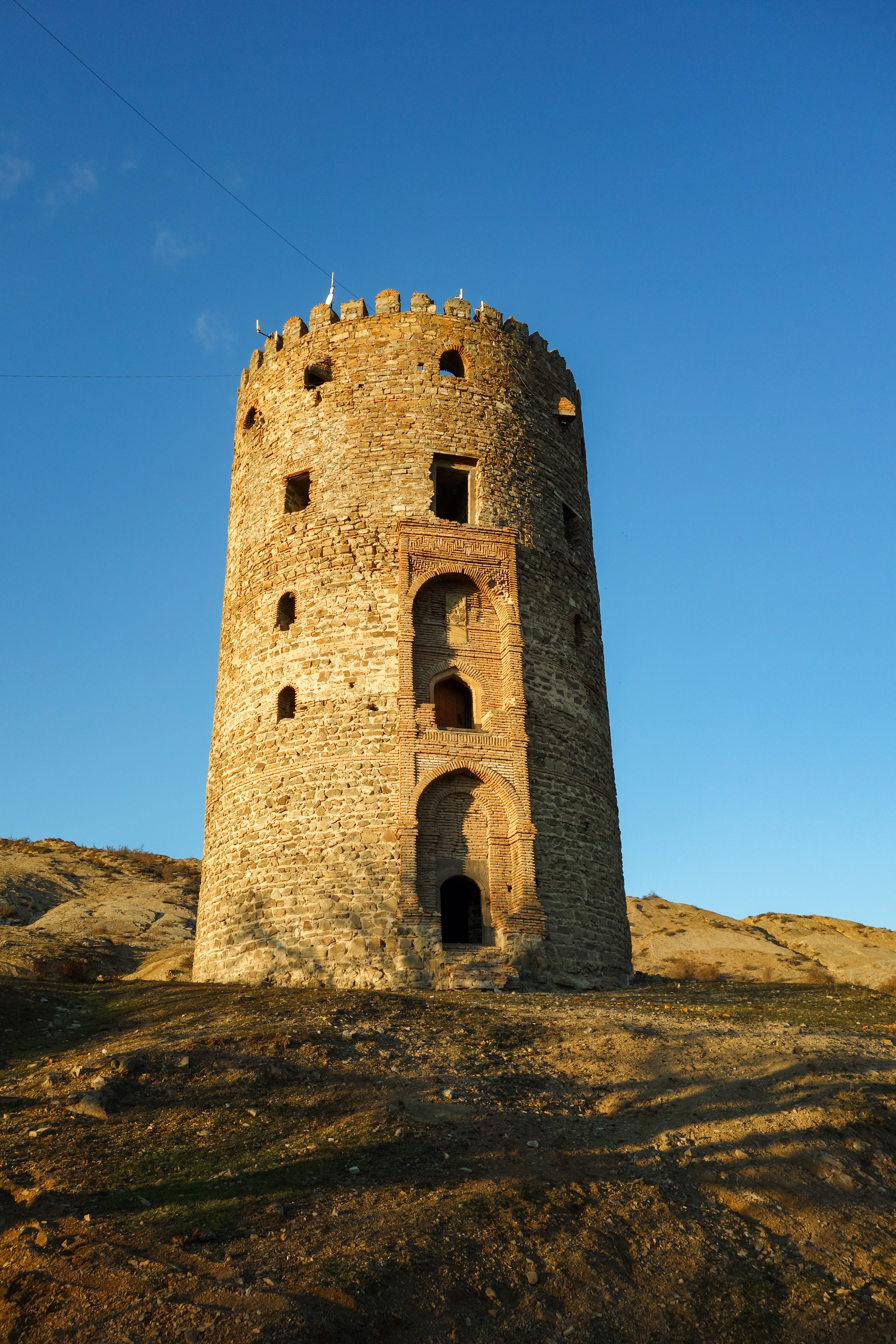
- Tower Salkhino in Vashlovani

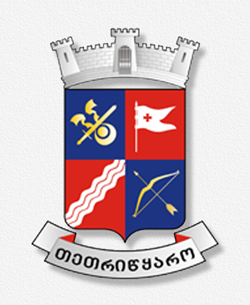
- Flag Seal

- Country: Georgia
- Mkhare: Kvemo Kartli
- Administrative centre: Tetritsqaro

Government
  - Type: Mayor–Council
  - Body: Tetritsqaro Municipal Assembly
  - Mayor: Giorgi Tsiklauri (GD)

Area
  - Total: 1,174.5 km^{2} (453.5 sq mi)

Population (2021)
  - Total: 22,485
  - Density: 19.144/km^{2} (49.584/sq mi)

Population by ethnicity
  - Georgians: 82,5 %
  - Azerbaijanis: 7,3 %
  - Armenians: 7,3 %
  - Russians: 1,3 %
  - Greeks: 0,9 %
- Time zone: UTC+4 (Georgian Time)
- Website: tetritskaro.gov.ge

Tetritskaro (Georgian: თეთრიწყაროს მუნიციპალიტეტი, Tetrićqaros Municiṕaliťeťi) is a district of Georgia, in the region of Kvemo Kartli. Its main town is Tetritskaro. Tetritskaro municipality is located in the eastern part of Georgia and is a self-governing unit in the Kvemo Kartli region. The municipality is bordered on the east by Gardabani and Marneuli, on the west by Tsalka and Dmanisi, on the north by Kaspi and Mtskheta, and the south by Bolnisi. The area of the municipality is 1,175.5 km^{2} (453.9 sq mi), the minimum altitude is 650 metres (2,130 ft) above sea level, and the maximum altitude where the settlement is located is 1,140 metres (3,740 ft). The administrative center of the municipality - Tetritskaro - is 57 km (35 mi) away from Tbilisi, 60 km (37 mi) from the center of the region - Rustavi - and seven kilometres (4.3 mi) from the main railway (Tbilisi-Marabda-Akhalkalaki).

== Geography and climatic conditions ==
Tetritskaro municipality is characterized by mountainous terrain. It is dominated by a moderately humid climate, knows moderately cold winters and long warm summers. The average annual air temperature is 12 °C (in the lowlands) to 2 °C (in the mountains) depending on the zoning. The coldest month of the year, January is 0 °C in the lowlands and -10 °C in the mountains, and the warmest month, July, is 15 °C in the mountains and 24 °C in the lowlands. The average annual rainfall is from 500 mm (in the lowlands) to 900 mm (in the mountains). Precipitation is maximum in May (119 mm) and minimum in December (30 mm).

Frequent hydrographic network in Tetritskaro municipality on the river. Belongs to the Mtkvari basin. Two main rivers are flowing in the territory of the municipality - Algeti and Khrami, two small ones - Vere and Aslanka, the latter join the river Khrami.

The river Algeti originates from Kldekari mountain (Trialeti mountain range), its length is 108 km, and the basin area is 763 km2, it joins the river Mtkvari on the right side. In the middle of the Algeti River, there is an Algeti Reservoir, which is used for irrigation.

The river Khrami (Ktsia) originates in the territory of Tsalka municipality and joins the Mtkvari in the territory of Azerbaijan through Tetritskaro, Bolnisi, Dmanisi, Marneuli territories. Its length is 117 km, the basin area is 6280 km2.

The river Vere originates from the Didgori mountain area, its length is 45 km, the basin area is 194 km2. The river joins the Mtkvari in the vicinity of Tbilisi and is its right tributary. The river Aslanka originates from Beden mountain and its length is 87 km.

== Economy and natural resources ==
Agriculture occupies a leading place in the economy of the municipality. Most of the population is employed in this field. Livestock and plants are the main agricultural activities in the municipality. The municipality is divided into two agricultural zones, where different agricultural products are grown: in the lower zone (villages: Koda, Marabda, Borbalo, Asureti, Georgiashvili, Chkhikvta, Khaishi, Durnuki, Tsintskaro, Goltevi, Daghetzoleg, Marghulo) And vegetables: wheat, corn, potatoes, beans, tomatoes, as well as various fruits.

In the mountain zone (Tetritskaro, D. Manglisi, Chivchavi, Kldeisi, Iraga, Akhalsopeli, Shekhvetila, Toneti, Orbeti) the main leading activities are cattle breeding, as well as growing potatoes, autumn and spring grains.

Tetritskaro municipality is rich in mineral resources, there are basalt, ore, lime, manganese deposits in the municipality. Especially noteworthy is a large amount of basalt stone reserves, the correct use of which can bring great economic benefits to both the local population and the municipal budget, as the fee for mineral extraction is one of the most important sources of budget revenue.

== Administrative divisions ==
Tetritskaro municipality is administratively divided into 19 communities (თემი, temi) with 90 villages (სოფელი, sopeli), 13 of which are unpopulated. There is one urban-type settlement (დაბა, daba) and one city (ქალაკი, kalaki).

- city: Tetritsqaro;
- daba: Manglisi;
- villages: for example Gudarekhi, Enageti and Samshvilde.

In the municipality, 51 settlements were granted the status of a highland settlement, which opens up extra government funds for development and social support.

== Population ==
The population of Tetritskaro Municipality is 22,485 according to the 2021 estimate, which is 6% increase from the last census of 2014 (21,127). The ethnic composition is 82.5% Georgian, 7.3% Azerbaijani, 7.3% Armenian, 1.3% Russian and less than 1% Greek. The population density is 19.1 people per square kilometer. 5,658 people live in urban areas (city Tetritsqaro and daba Manglisi), which is 25% of the municipality.

Population Tetritskaro Municipality
	1897	1926	1939	1959	1970	1979	1989	2002	2014	2021
Tetritskaro Municipality	-	-	-	39,150	▼36,945	▼34,593	▲36,432	▼25,354	▼21,127	▲22,485
Tetritsqaro (Note: Until 1940 Tetritskaro town was called Aghbulaghi.)	-	-	▲2,156	▲5,564	▲6,896	▲7,281	▲8,692	▼4,041	▼3,093	▲3,960
Manglisi (daba)	-	2,883	▲3,528	▲4,333	▼3,757	▲3,797	▲4,013	▼2,752	▼1,441	▲1,698
Data: Population statistics Georgia 1897 to present. Note: (Note: The 2014 census found an inexplicable gap with the data from the national statistical office Geostat. UN-assisted research has found the 2002 census was inflated by about 8–9 percent. See, "1. Introduction", Page 1.)

== Politics ==
Tetritsqaro Municipal Assembly (Georgian: თეთრიწყაროს საკრებულო) is the representative body in Tetritsqaro Municipality, consisting of 36 members which are elected every four years. The last election was held in October 2021. Giorgi Tsiklauri of Georgian Dream was elected as mayor.

Party	2017	2021	Current Municipal Assembly
Georgian Dream	29	27	
United National Movement	3	7	
For Georgia		1	
Lelo		1	
Alliance of Patriots	1		
Democratic Movement	1		
Labour Party	1		
Total	35	36	

== Historical sites ==
Samshvilde

- Kldekari Fortress
- Samshvilde
- Birtvisi Fortress
- Pitareti Monastery
- Manglisi Cathedral
- Gudarekhi monastery
- Abelia church
- Orbet Castle

== Gallery ==
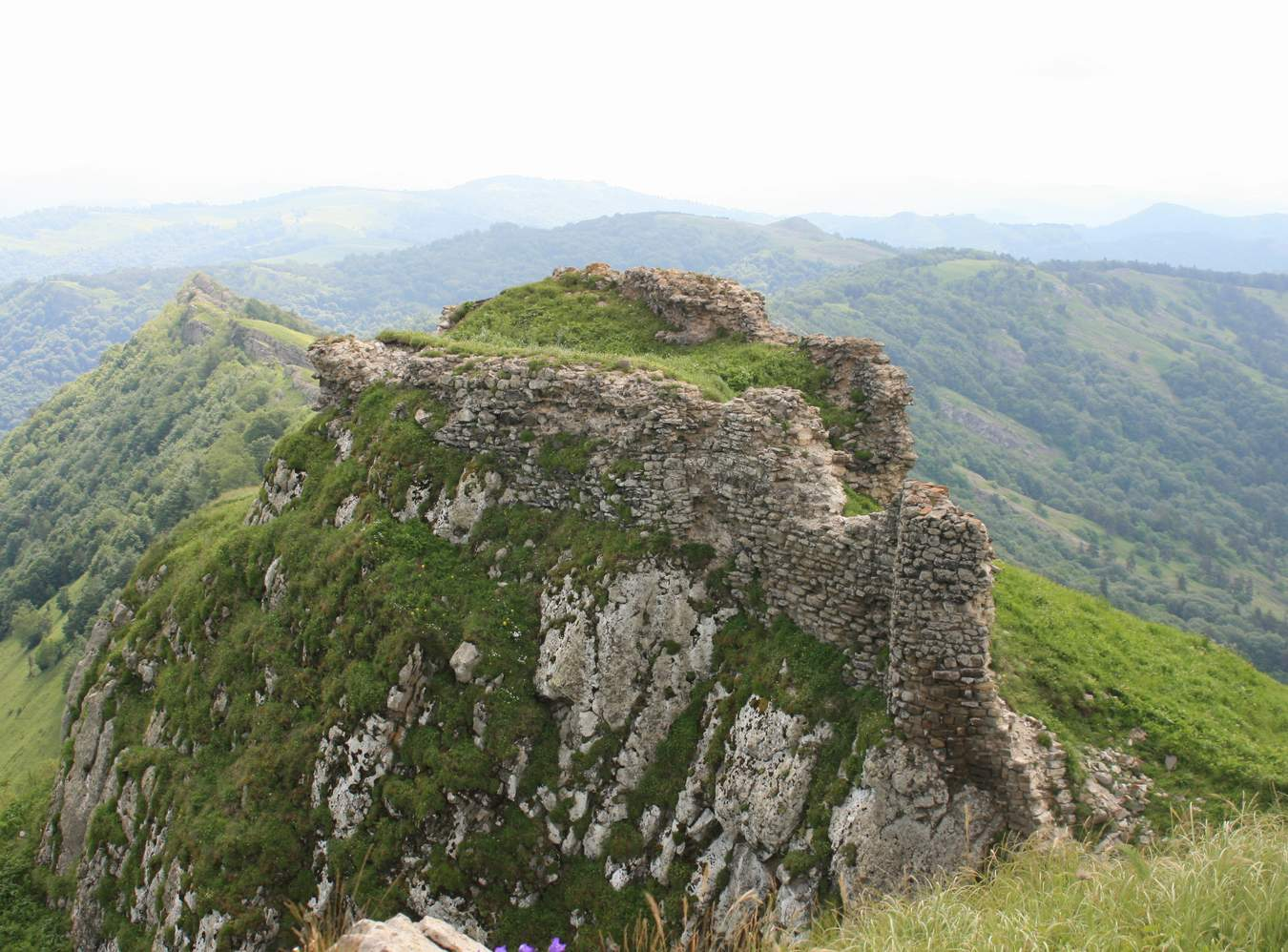
Kldekari Fortress

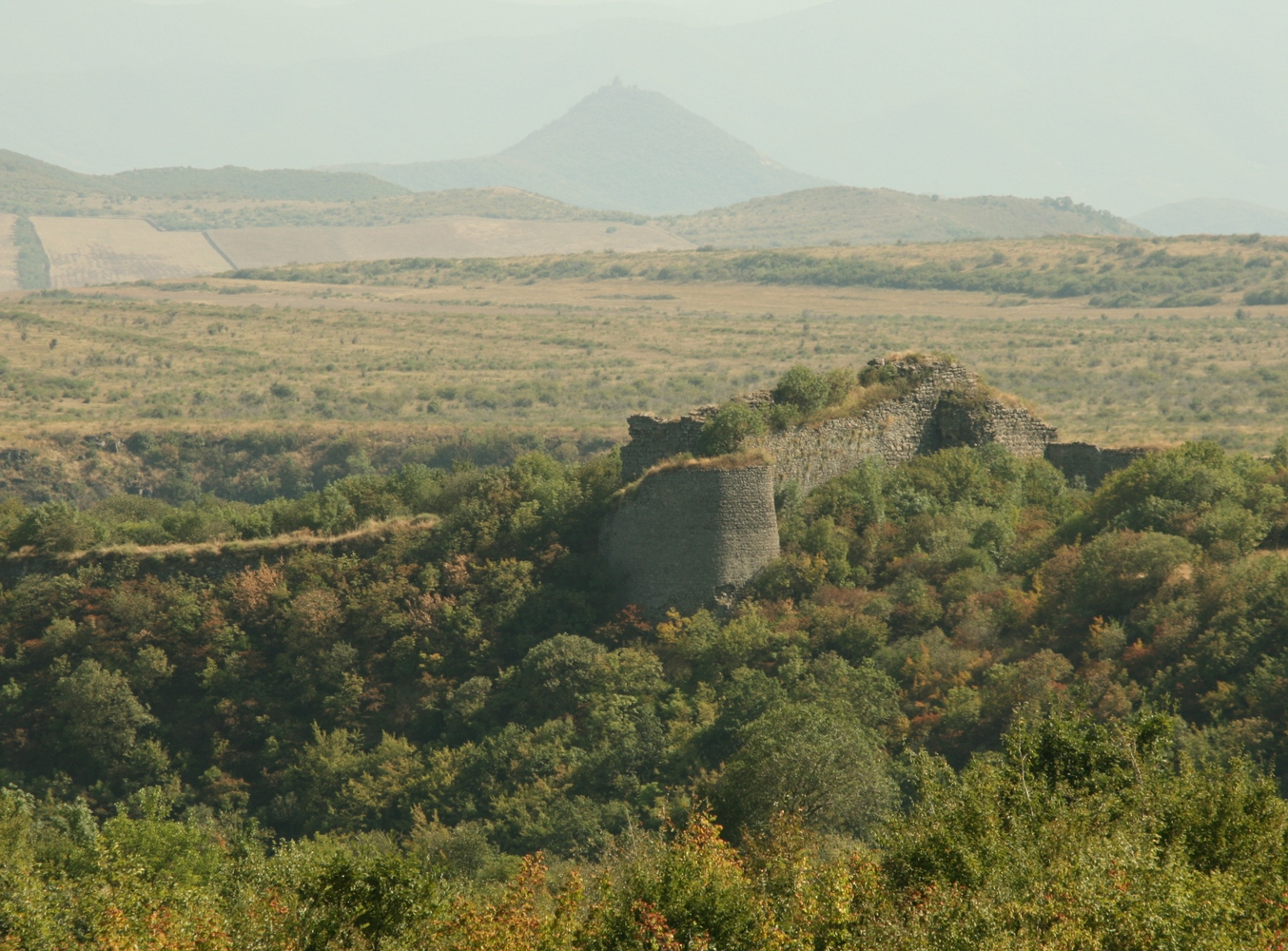
Samshvilde fortress

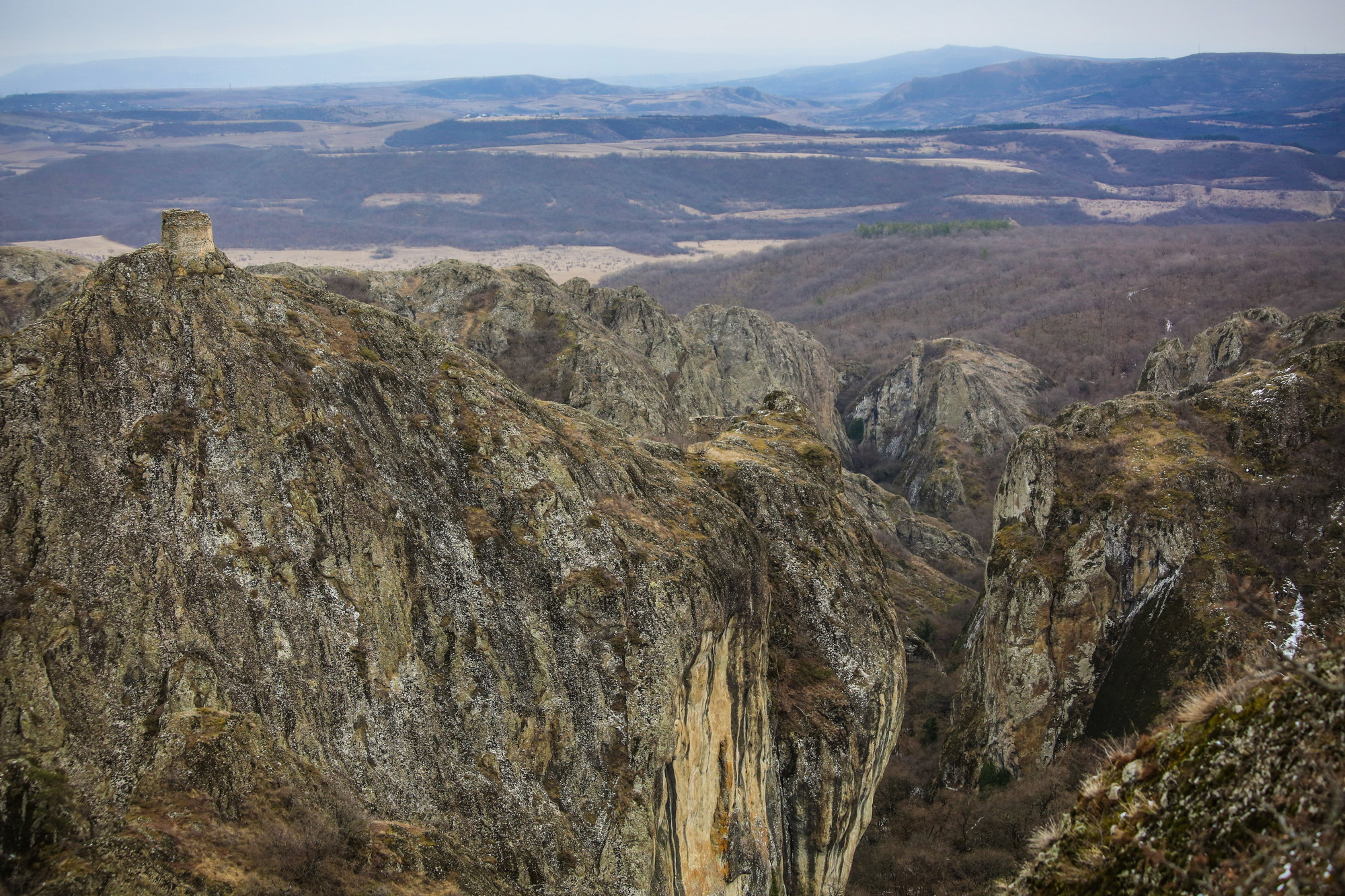
Birtvisi Fortress

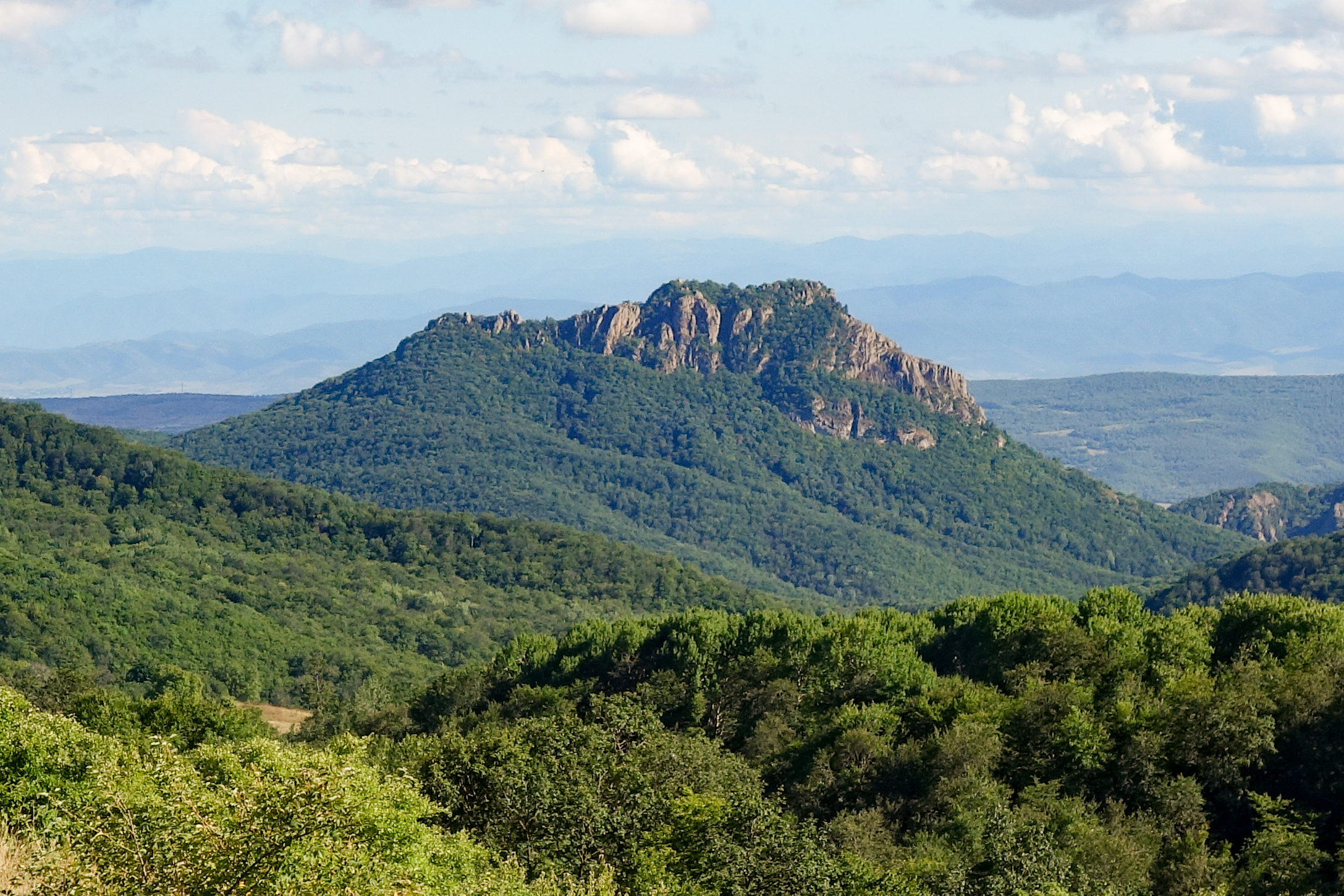
Orbeti Fortress

== See also ==
- List of municipalities in Georgia (country)
- Enageti
