= Kvemo Kartli =

Region of Georgia

Coordinates: 41°31′N 44°31′E

Kvemo Kartli ქვემო ქართლი
- Mkhare (region)
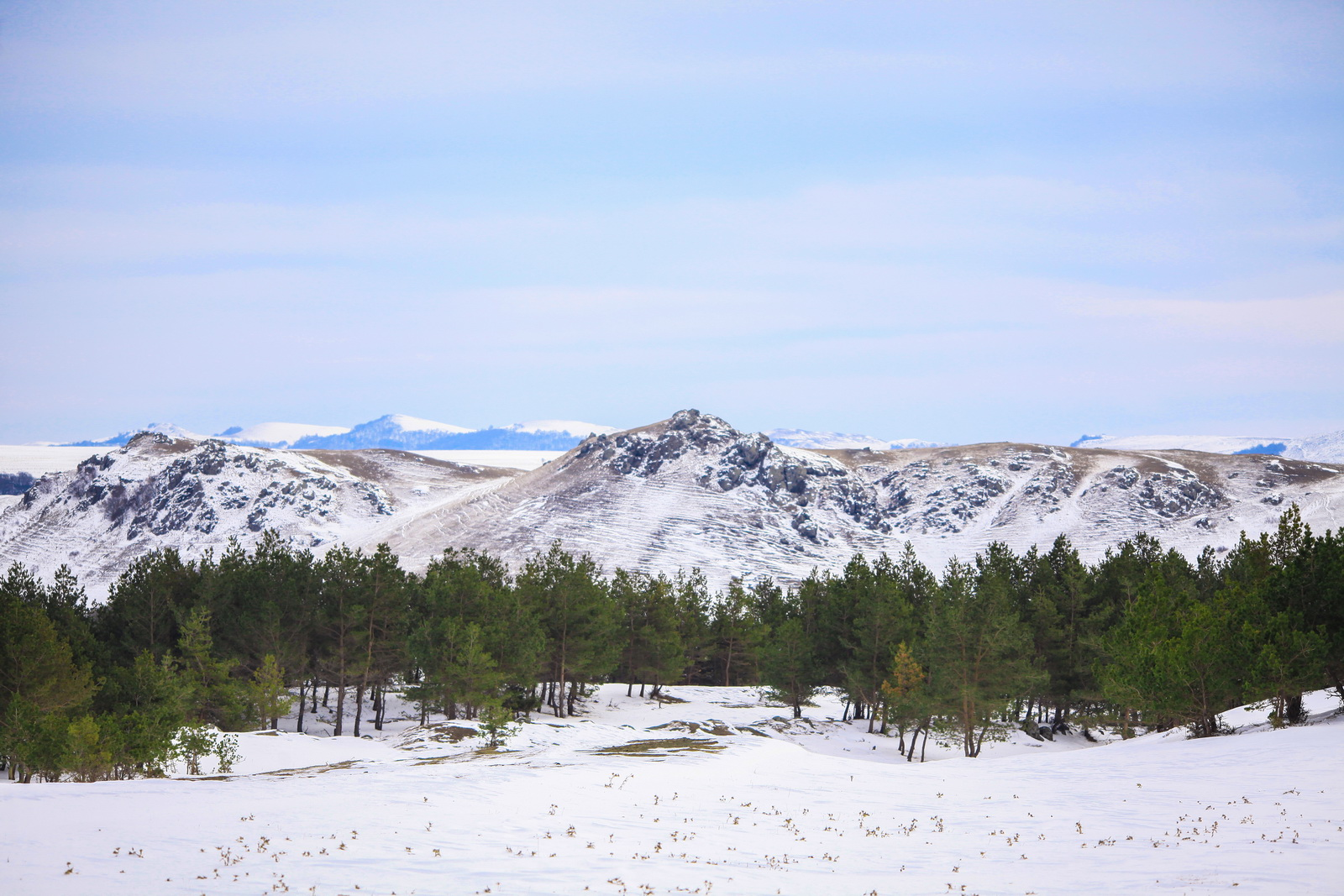
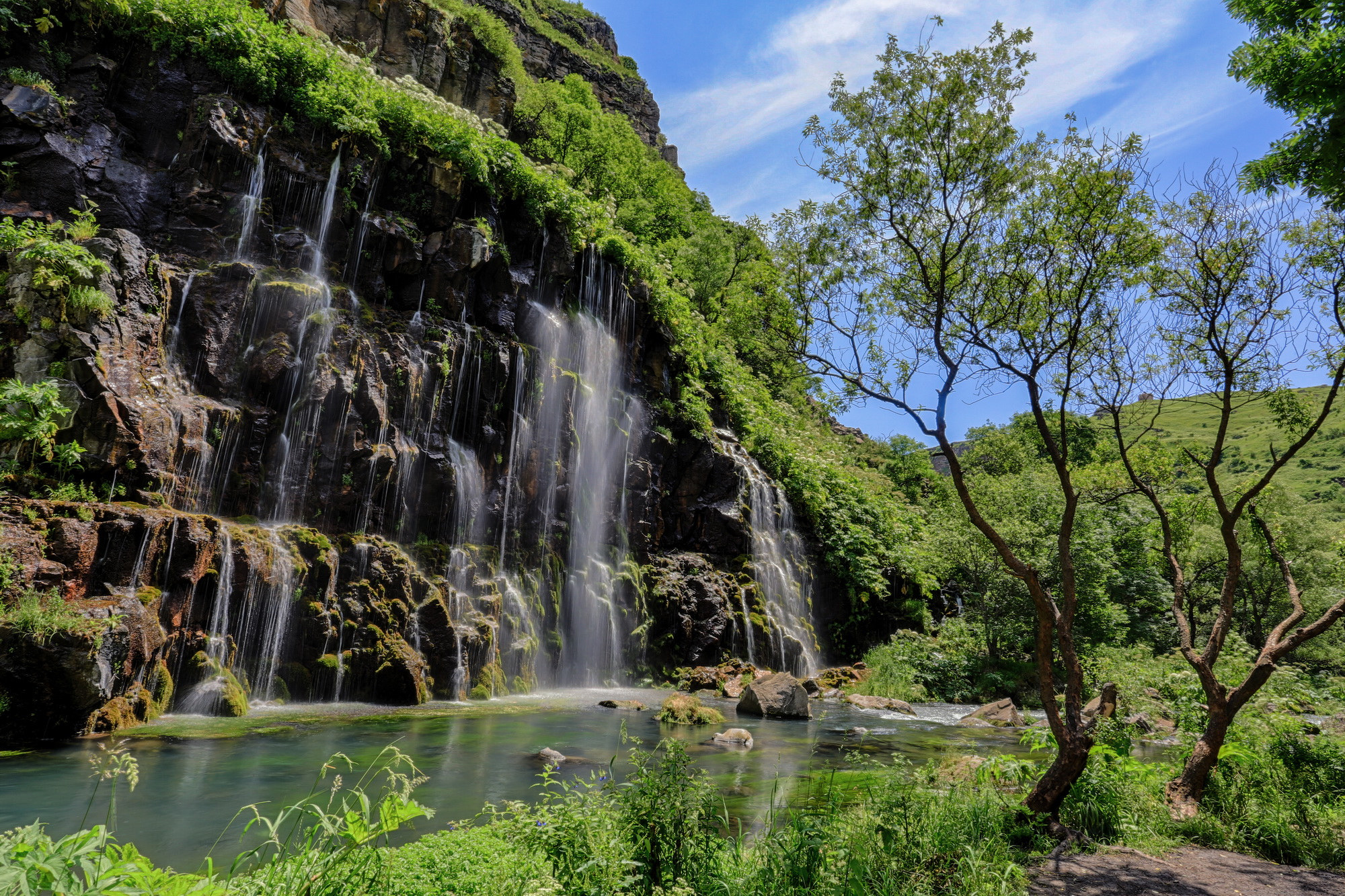
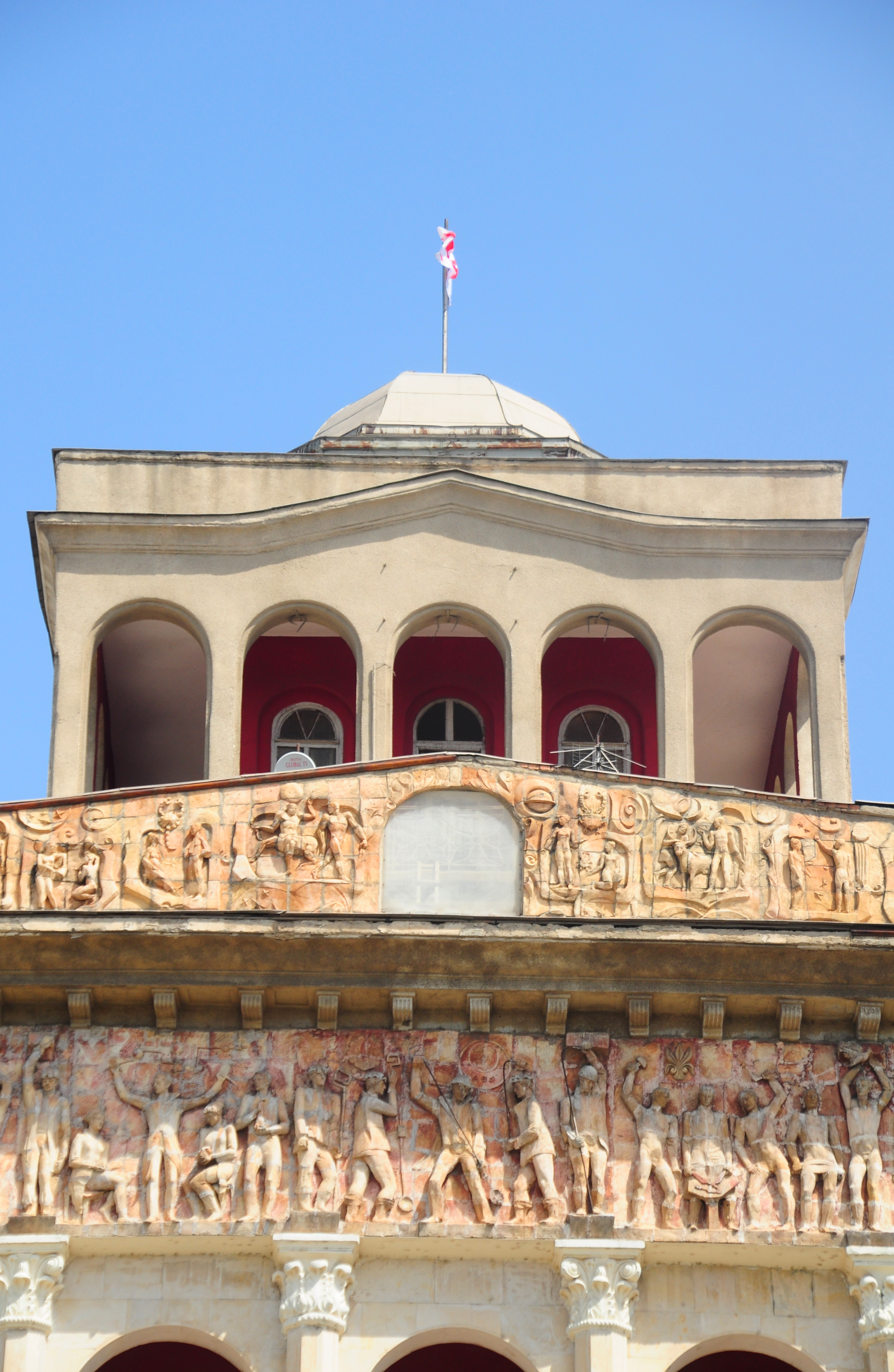
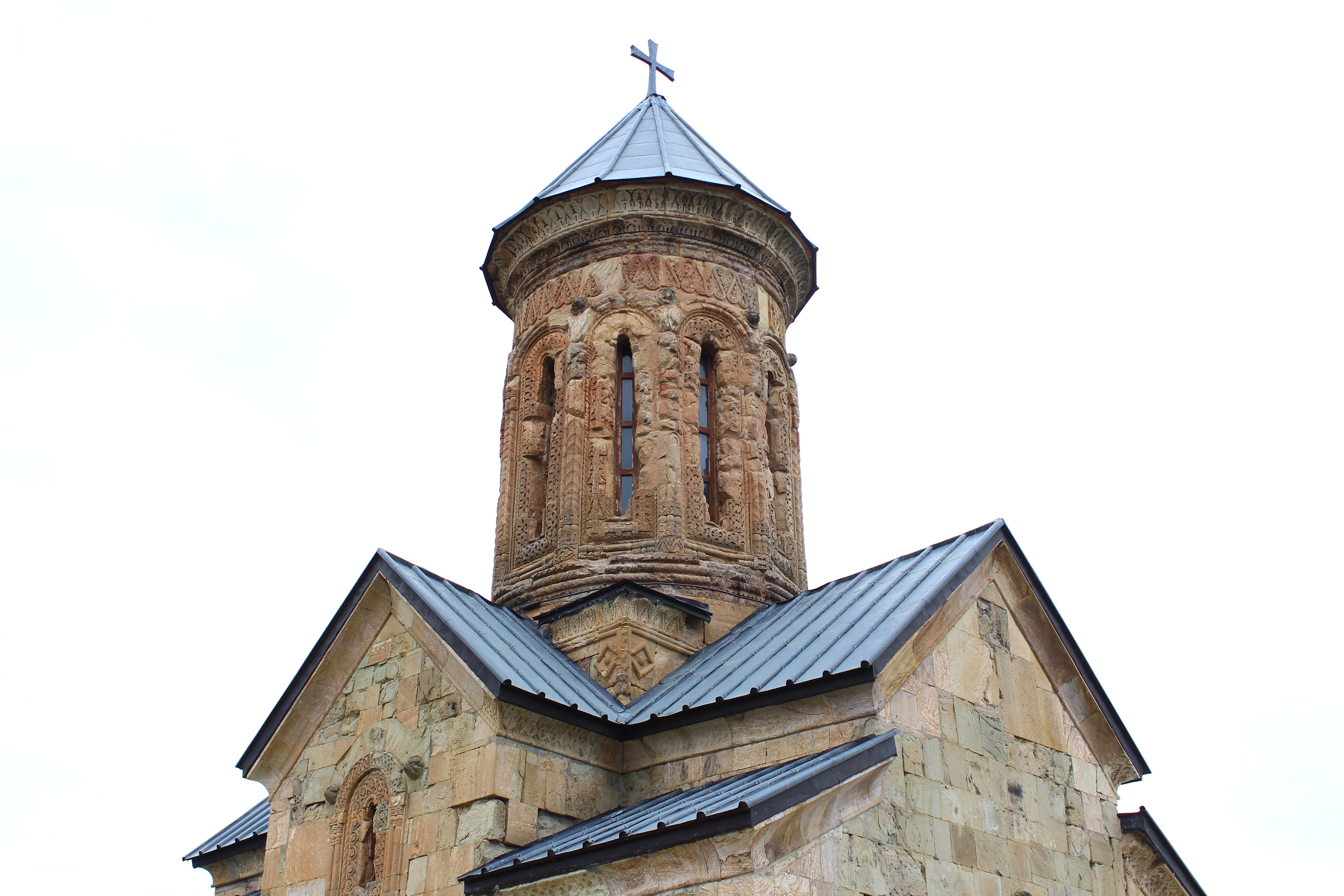
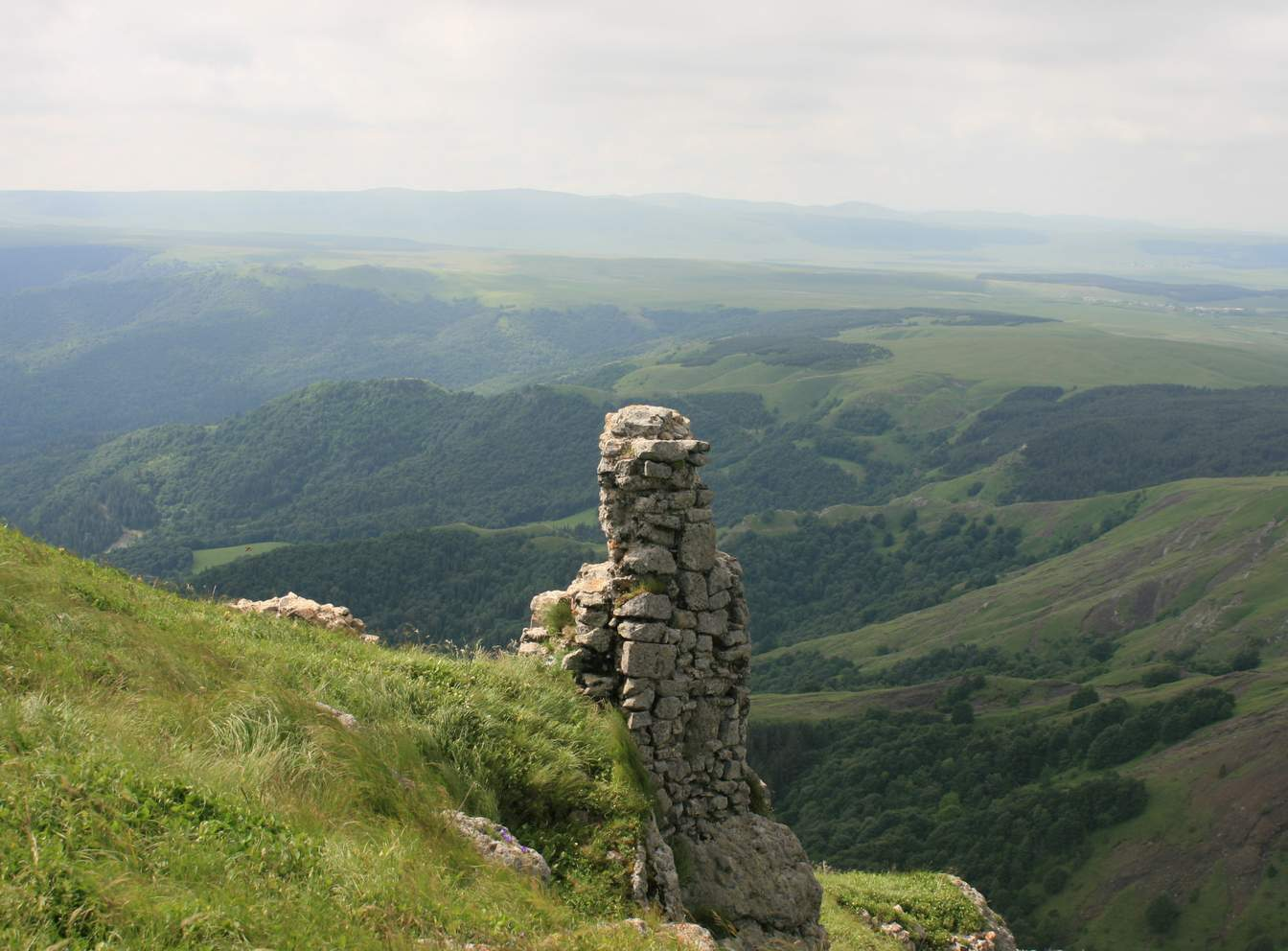
- From the top to bottom-right: Algeti National Park, Dashbashi Waterfall, Rustavi Metallurgical Plant, Tsughrughasheni, Kldekari Fortress

- Country: Georgia
- Seat: Rustavi
- Subdivisions: 1 city, 6 municipalities

Government
  - Governor: Paata Khizanashvili

Area
  - Total: 6,527.6 km^{2} (2,520.3 sq mi)

Population (2020)
  - Total: 434,241
  - Estimate (2023): 442,771
  - Density: 66.524/km^{2} (172.30/sq mi)

Gross Regional Product
  - Total: ₾ 5.39 billion (2022)
  - Per Capita: ₾ 12,413 (2022)
- ISO 3166 code: GE-KK
- HDI (2023): 0.824 high · 5th
- Website: kvemokartli.gov.ge/eng/

Kvemo Kartli (Georgian: ქვემო ქართლი, IPA: [kʰʷemo kʰaɾtʰli]; lit. 'Lower Kartli') is a historic province and current administrative region (mkhare) in southeastern Georgia. The city of Rustavi is the regional capital.

== Location ==
Kvemo Kartli is a region located in the Southeastern part of Georgia. It borders Tbilisi, Shida Kartli, and Mtskheta-Mtianeti on the north; Samtskhe–Javakheti on the west; Kakheti on the east; and the countries of Armenia and Azerbaijan on the south.

== General information ==
The region is one of the most economically developed in Georgia. After Tbilisi, the region is ranked second in industrial production. The area of the region is of 6528 km squares, which accounts for 10% of the Georgian territory; and it is the fourth largest region by area. The region is the third most populated region in Georgia with a population of 434,000. The administrative center is Rustavi. There are 353 populated areas, including:

- 7 cities: Rustavi, Bolnisi, Gardabani, Dmanisi, Tetritsqaro, Marneuli and Tsalka
- 6 "daba": Kazreti, Manglisi, Tamarisi, Shaumiani, Bediani and Trialeti
- 338 villages

== Demographics ==
In 2014, Kvemo Kartli province of Georgia had the following ethnic makeup of 423,986 total population:

- Georgians – 217,305 (51.25%)
- Azerbaijanis – 177,032 (41.75%)
- Armenians – 21,500 (5.07%)
- Russians – 2,631 (0.62%)
- Greeks – 2,113 (0.49%)

The population estimate in 2012 was 511,300, but the 2014 census shows it now reduced to about 424,000.

The ethnic Georgians live mostly in northern part of the region and comprise the majority in the municipalities of Tetritsqaro, Gardabani, Tsalka and in Rustavi. The Azerbaijanis (Karapapakhs) live in the southern part and comprise for the majority in the municipalities of Marneuli, Dmanisi and Bolnisi. The ethnic Armenians and Greeks mostly live in the Tsalka Municipality.

=== Religions ===
According to 2014 census, 51.4% of the population identifies as Orthodox Christians, mostly Georgians, Russians and Greeks; 42.9% are Muslims, mostly Azerbaijanis; 3.3% are Armenian Christians and 0.2% are irreligious.

== Administrative divisions ==
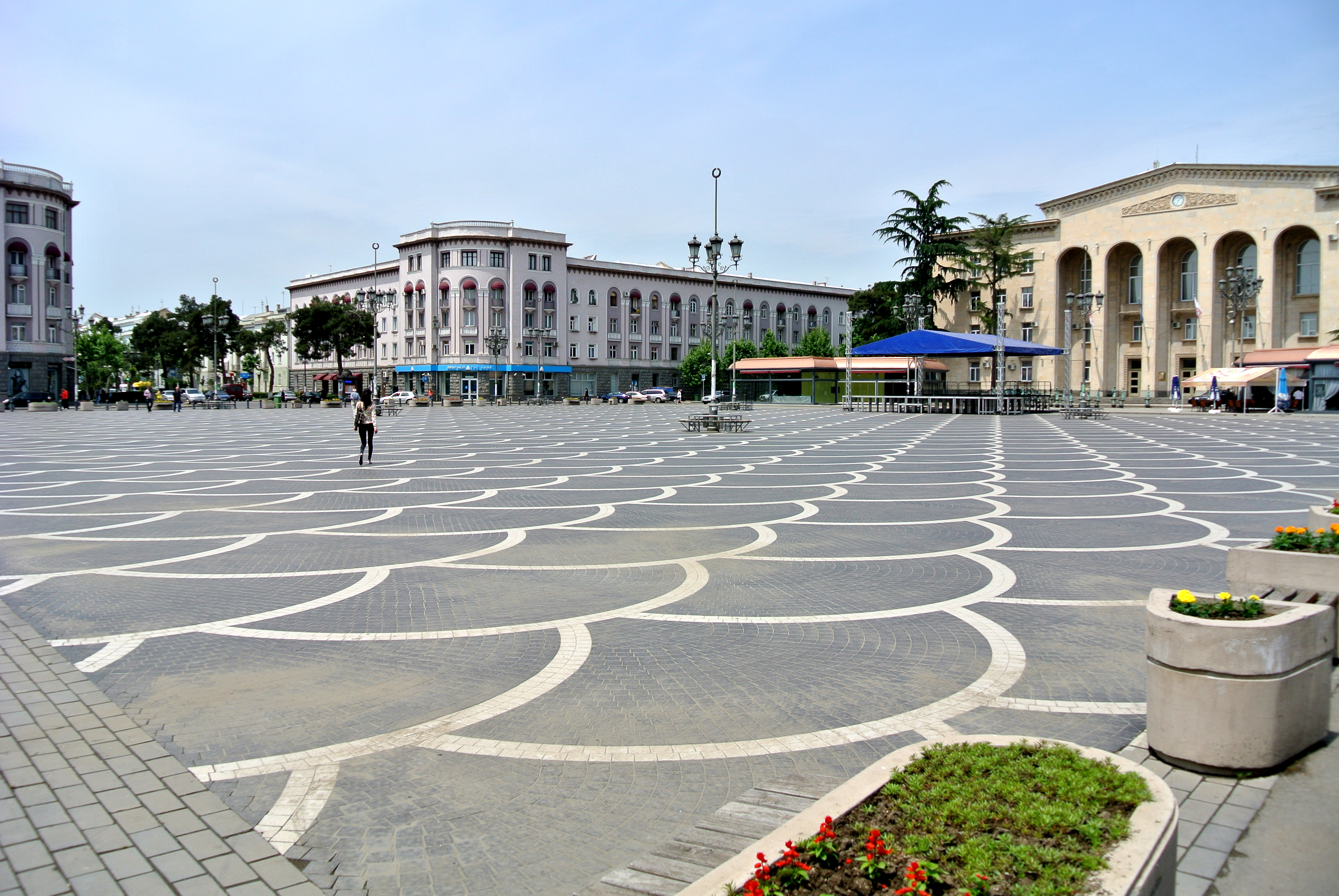
Rustavi, the biggest city of the region

Kvemo Kartli is divided into 6 municipalities and 1 special status city, Rustavi:

Municipality/City	Pop.	Town/Village	Pop.
Bolnisi	53,590	Bolnisi	13,800
Gardabani	81,876	Gardabani	10,753
Dmanisi	19,141	Dmanisi	2,661
Marneuli	104,300	Marneuli	20,211
Tetritsqaro	21,127	Tetritsqaro	3,093
Tsalka	18,849	Tsalka	2,326
Rustavi	127,800		

== Economy ==
Owing to its location, the region has great transport links. There passes the railway and the motorways which link Georgia with its neighbours Armenia and Azerbaijan. The main industries are located in Rustavi and Marneuli. The industrial production of Kvemo Kartlo comprises 20% of the global Georgian production.

== Monuments ==
Kvemo Kartli inherited a lot of historical monuments such as the Bolnisi Sioni, the Pitareti Monastery, Birtvisi, Samshvilde and the old inhabited area near Dmanisi
