= Józef Poliński Park =

Urban park in Warsaw, Poland

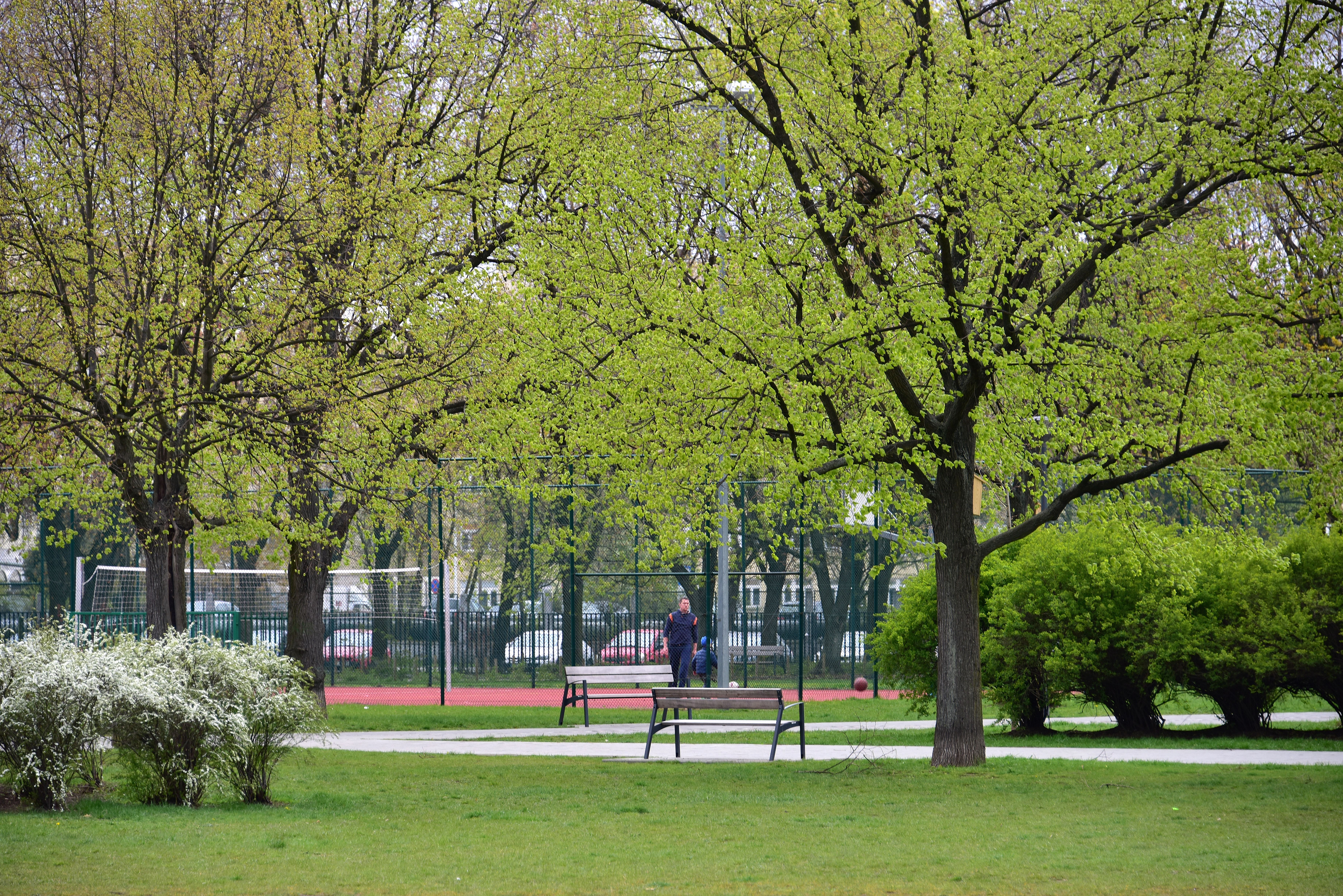
- The Józef Poliński Park in 2017.
- Interactive map of Józef Poliński Park
- Type: Urban park
- Location: Praga-South, Warsaw, Poland
- Coordinates: 52°14′55″N 21°05′24″E
- Created: 1962

The Józef Poliński Park (Note: Polish: Park im. Józefa Polińskiego) is an urban park in Warsaw, Poland. It is located in the neighbourhood of Grochów, within the district of Praga-South, at the crossing of Garwolińska Street and Szaserów Street. The park was opened in 1962

== History ==
The park was opened in 1962, replacing community gardens, and originally named the Chasseur Park (Polish Park Szaserów). In 2000, it was renamed to its current name, after Józef Poliński (1891–1944), a local social activist and a soldier of the Home Army in the World War II. There was also added a monument dedicated to him.

The park was renovated in 2015, during which a fence, dog park, a new children playground, a fountain, and two pavilions were added.

In 2017, in the park was unveiled a monument dedicated to Maciej Sulkiewicz (1865–1920), an independence fighter and the General Staff of Azerbaijani Armed Forces, and Vali bey Yadigarov (1897–1971), a soldier of the Home Army in the World War II. They were founded by the government of Azerbaijan.

== Characteristics ==
The park is located in the neighbourhood of Grochów in the district of Praga-South, at the crossing of Garwolińska Street and Szaserów Street. It has the total area of 5.52 ha. There are located monuments dedicated to Józef Poliński, Maciej Sulkiewicz, and Vali bey Yadigarov.
