= Memorial to the Heroes Fighting for the Independence of Poland and Azerbaijan =

Monument in Warsaw, Poland

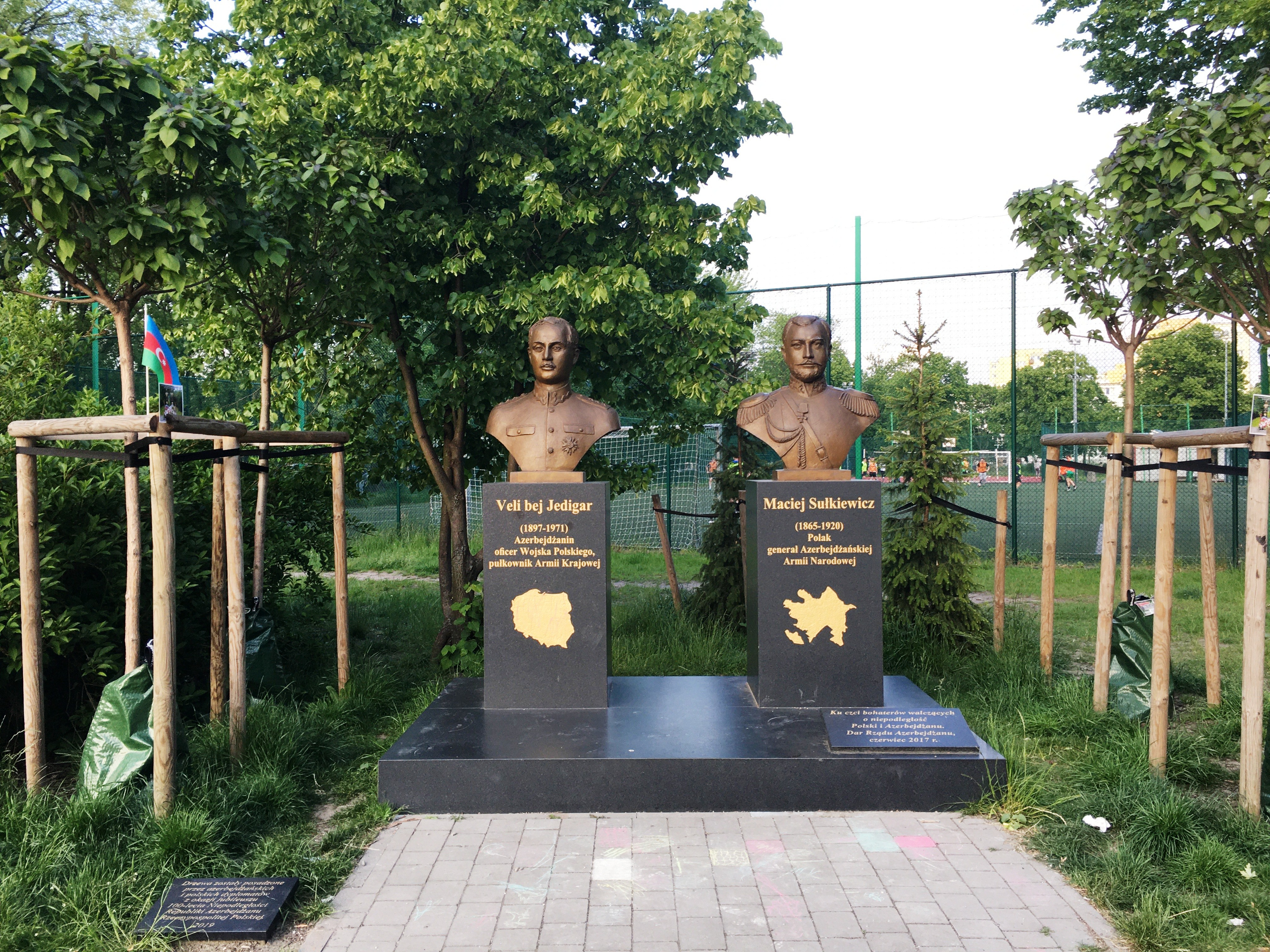
- The busts of Vali bey Yadigarov (right) and Maciej Sulkiewicz (left).
- Interactive map of Memorial to the Heroes Fighting for the Independence of Poland and Azerbaijan
- Location: Józef Poliński Park, Praga-South, Warsaw, Poland
- Coordinates: 52.249683°N 21.089613°E
- Type: Busts
- Dedicated to: Veli bey Yadigar; Maciej Sulkiewicz

The Memorial to the Heroes Fighting for the Independence of Poland and Azerbaijan (Polish: Pomnik ku czci bohaterów walczących o niepodleglość Polski i Azerbejdżanu; Azerbaijani: Müstəqil Polşa və Azərbaycan uğrunda mübarizlərin xatirəsinə abidə) is a monument in Warsaw, Poland, within the district of Praga-Południe. Located in the Józef Poliński Park next to Szaserów Street, it consists of two busts of Polish and Azerbaijani soldiers, Veli bey Yadigar and Maciej Sulkiewicz. The prior was a member of the Polish Armed Forces during the Second World War, and the latter, the Chief of the General Staff of Azerbaijani Armed Forces from 1918 to 1920.

== History ==
The monument was proposed by Hasan Hasanov, the ambassador of Azerbaijan to Poland, and financed by his country's government. It consists of two busts, depicting two Polish and Azerbaijani soldiers, Veli bey Yadigar and Maciej Sulkiewicz. The prior was a member of the Polish Armed Forces during the Second World War, and the latter, the Chief of the General Staff of Azerbaijani Armed Forces from 1918 to 1920.

The sculptures were unveiled on 7 September 2017 in the Józef Poliński Park in Warsaw. The ceremony was attended by Zakir Hasanov, the Minister of Defence of Azerbaijan, Michał Dworczyk, the Secretary of State of the Ministry of National Defence of Poland, and Tomasz Kucharski, the mayor of Praga-South.

== Design ==
The monument consists of two busts depicting Veli bey Yadigar and Maciej Sulkiewicz in military uniforms. They are placed on black stone pedestals, featuring Polish inscriptions.

Yadigar is inscribed with:

Polish text

Veli bej Jedigar
(1897–1971)
Azerbejdżanin
oficer Wojska Polskiego,
pułkownik Armii Krajowej

Translation:
English translation

Veli bey Yadigar
(1897–1971)
Azerbaijani
officer of the Polish Armed Forces,
colonel of the Home Army

Sulkiewicz is inscribed with:

Polish text

Maciej Sulkiewicz
(1865–1920)
Polak
generał Azerbejdżańskiej
Armii Narodowej

Translation:
English translation

Maciej Sulkiewicz
(1865–1920)
Pole
General of the Azerbaijani Armed Forces

Below the pedestals is placed plaque, with an inscription which says:

Polish text

Ku czci bohaterów walczących
o niepodległość
Polski i Azerbejdżanu.
Dar Rządu Azerbejdżanu
czerwiec 2017 r.

Translation:
English translation

In honour of the heroes fighting
for the independence of
Poland and Azerbaijan
Gift of the Government of Azerbaijan
June 2017.

Additionally, on the ground next to the monument, another plaque is also installed, with an inscription which says:

Polish text

Drzewa zostały posadzone
przez azerbejdżańskich i polskich dyplomatów
z okazji jubileuszu
100-lecia Niepodległości
Republiki Azerbejdżanu
i Rzeczpospolitej Polskiej.
2019

Translation:
English translation

The trees were planted
by the Azerbaijani and Polish diplomats
to celebrate
the 100th anniversary of the Independence of
the Republic of Azerbaijan
and the Republic of Poland.
2019
