= Akhkula =

Akhkula ახკულა
- Location within Georgia
- Coordinates: 41°18′35″N 44°44′5″E
- Country: Georgia
- Mkhare: Kvemo Kartli
- Municipality: Marneuli

Population (2014)
  - Total: 86
- Time zone: UTC+4 (Georgian Time)

Akhkula (Georgian: ახკულა) is a village in Georgia’s Kvemo Kartli region with a population of 86. It had 150 inhabitants in 2002.

== Demography ==
The composition of population of Akhkula
Ethnic group	2014
Georgians	1
Armenians	0
Azerbaijanis	85
Others	0
