= Aghmamedlo =

Aghmamedlo აღმამედლო
- Location within Georgia
- Coordinates: 41°19′48″N 44°54′14″E
- Country: Georgia
- Mkhare: Kvemo Kartli
- Municipality: Marneuli

Population (2014)
  - Total: 2,289
- Time zone: UTC+4 (Georgian Time)

Aghmamedlo (Georgian: აღმამედლო) is a village in Georgia’s Kvemo Kartli region with a population of 2,289. It had 2,867 inhabitants in 2002, mostly ethnic Azerbaijanis.

== Demography ==
The composition of population of Aghmamedlo
Ethnic group	2014
Georgians	2
Armenians	0
Azerbaijanis	2283
Others	2
