= Khojorni =

Khojorni ხოჯორნი
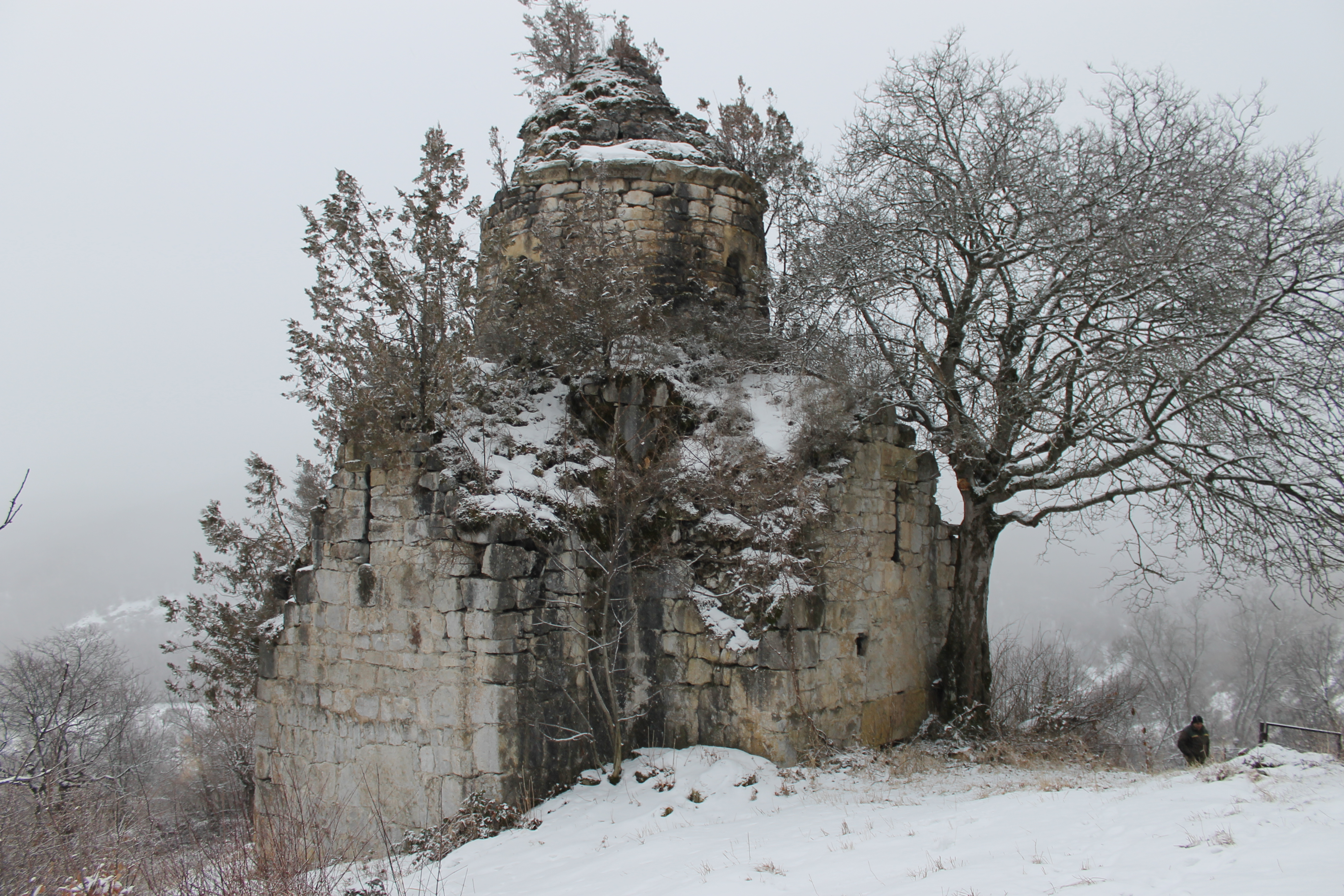
- Church in Khojorni

- Location within Georgia
- Coordinates: 41°13′40″N 44°41′25″E
- Country: Georgia
- Mkhare: Kvemo Kartli
- Municipality: Marneuli
- Elevation: 820 m (2,690 ft)

Population (2014)
  - Total: 635
- Time zone: UTC+4 (Georgian Time)

Khojorni (Georgian: ხოჯორნი) is a village in Georgia’s Kvemo Kartli region with the population of 635. It had 842 inhabitants in 2002.
