= Tserakvi =

Georgian orthodox monastery in Kvemo Kartli, Georgia

Tserakvi Monastery Complex
- წერაქვის სამონასტრო კომპლექსი
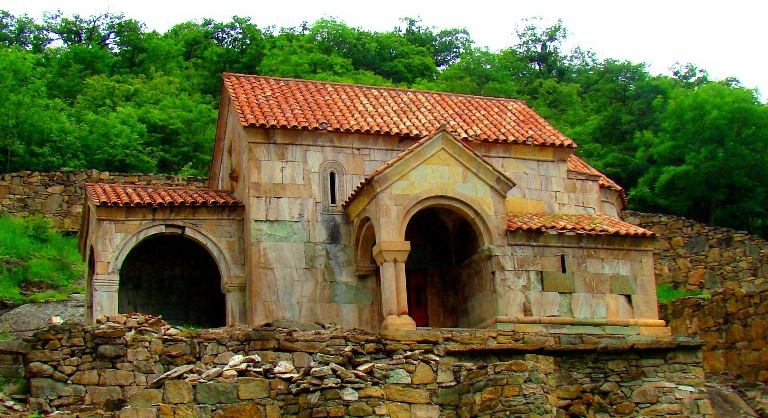
- The main church as it looks today

- Location within Kvemo Kartli Location within Georgia

Religion
- Affiliation: Georgian Orthodox
- District: Marneuli Municipality
- Province: Kvemo Kartli

Location
- Location: (Georgia (country)) Kvemo Kartli, Georgia
- Interactive map of Tserakvi Monastery Complex
- Coordinates: 41°17′40″N 44°39′58″E

Architecture
- Type: Church
- Completed: 12th-13th century

Tserakvi (Georgian: წერაქვი) is a Georgian Orthodox monastery in the Marneuli Municipality of Kvemo Kartli, Georgia, near the eponymous village, dating from the 12th to 13th centuries. The complex includes the churches of the Assumption and of St. George as well as a bell tower, a wine cellar, and fragments of a defensive wall. The church of the Assumption is a three-nave hall church and contains a wall inscription from the 15th century.

In 2006, it was granted the category of an immovable cultural monument of national importance by the President of Georgia, and now hosts a functioning monastery.

== Church of the Assumption ==
The main temple of the monastery, the Church of the Assumption of the Virgin Mary, also called Anchiskhati (ანჩისხატი), was built in the second half of the 13th century. The church is a two-nave structure constructed of cut, horizontal stone blocks. It is situated on a massif above a tall, artificial substructure on its southern side, and rests on a profiled plinth.

The nave of the church faces north and ends with a pastophorion. It's separated from the main space by two columns of square cross-section, where three arches are carried, while the column bases and the floor are carved into the rock. A small, low-arched opening leading to the apse is cut in the eastern part of the southern wall of the main nave. The altar, raised by a single high step, is separated from the main space by a stone lintel.

The entrance doors are cut into the western and southern walls, decorated with carvings. Both entrances have arched doorways and the southern doorway has a vault from the inside. The walls are finished with a cornice and the main nave has two windows cut into it. In the eastern facade lies a stone slab with an inscription talking about the renovation of the church. The southern and western windows have single lintels and the latter has quoins on both sides and a fragment of a sheep's head above. The windows are decorated with a folded plain lintel with crosses.

On the eastern large apse, a stone with an inscription in the wall mentions the Great Panaskerteli (referring to Zaza Panaskertel-Tsitsishvili), who rebuilt and renovated the church in the 15h century. It also underwent renovations from 2004 to 2010.

There is also a wine cellar, south of the main church, dating back to the late middle ages.

== St. George's Church ==
North-west of the main church stands a small hall-type building dating from the 16th to 18th centuries, dedicated to St. George. In the eastern part of the southern facade of the building there is a chapel.

== Church of the Archangels ==
Similar to St. George's Church, there is another hall-type building dating from the late 20th century on an old churchyard.
