= Marneuli Municipality =

Coordinates: 41°27′49″N 44°48′39″E

Marneuli Municipality მარნეულის მუნიციპალიტეტი Marneuli Bələdiyyəsi
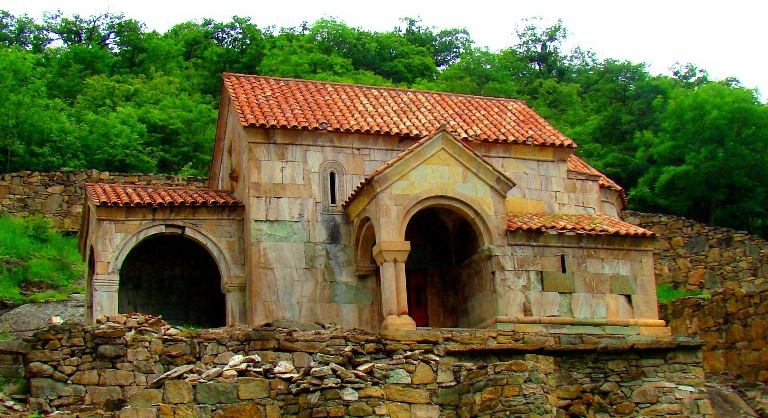
- Tserakvi

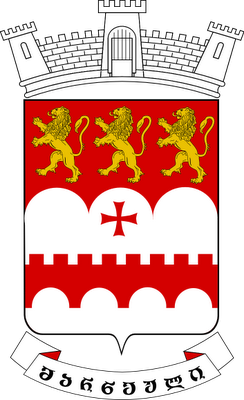
- Flag Seal

- Country: Georgia
- Mkhare: Kvemo Kartli
- Administrative centre: Marneuli

Government
  - Type: Mayor–Council
  - Body: Marneuli Municipal Assembly
  - Mayor: Kenan Omarov (GD)

Area
  - Total: 935.5 km^{2} (361.2 sq mi)

Population (2021)
  - Total: 107,824
  - Density: 115.3/km^{2} (298.5/sq mi)

Population by ethnicity
  - Azerbaijanis: 83.8%
  - Georgians: 8.6%
  - Armenians: 7.0%
  - Russians: 0.2%
  - Greeks: 0.1%
- Time zone: UTC+4 (Georgian Time)
- Website: http://marneuli.gov.ge/

Marneuli (Georgian: მარნეულის მუნიციპალიტეტი, Azerbaijani: Marneuli Bələdiyyəsi) is a municipality in Georgia, in the region of Kvemo Kartli. Its administrative center and main town is Marneuli.

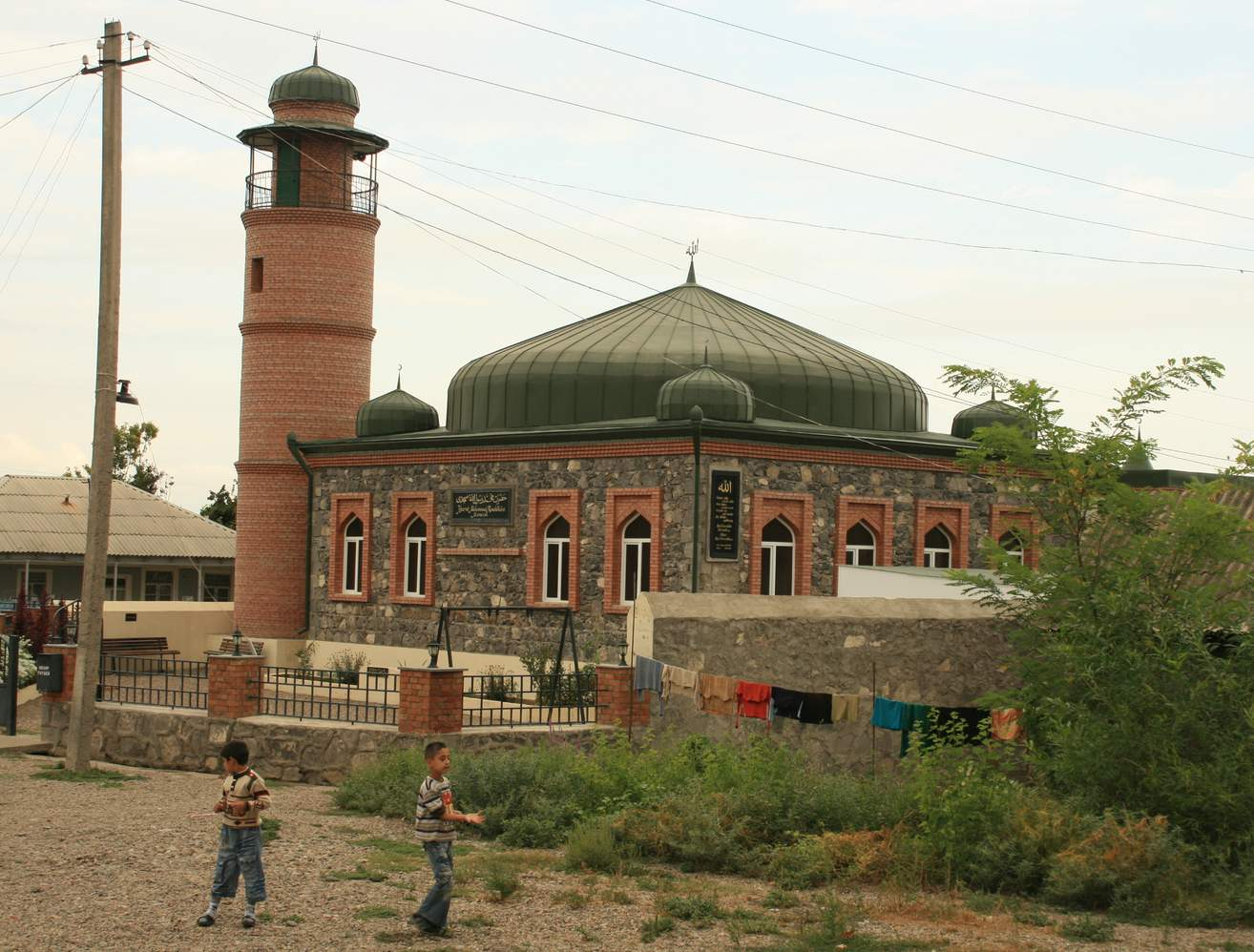
Mosque in Imiri

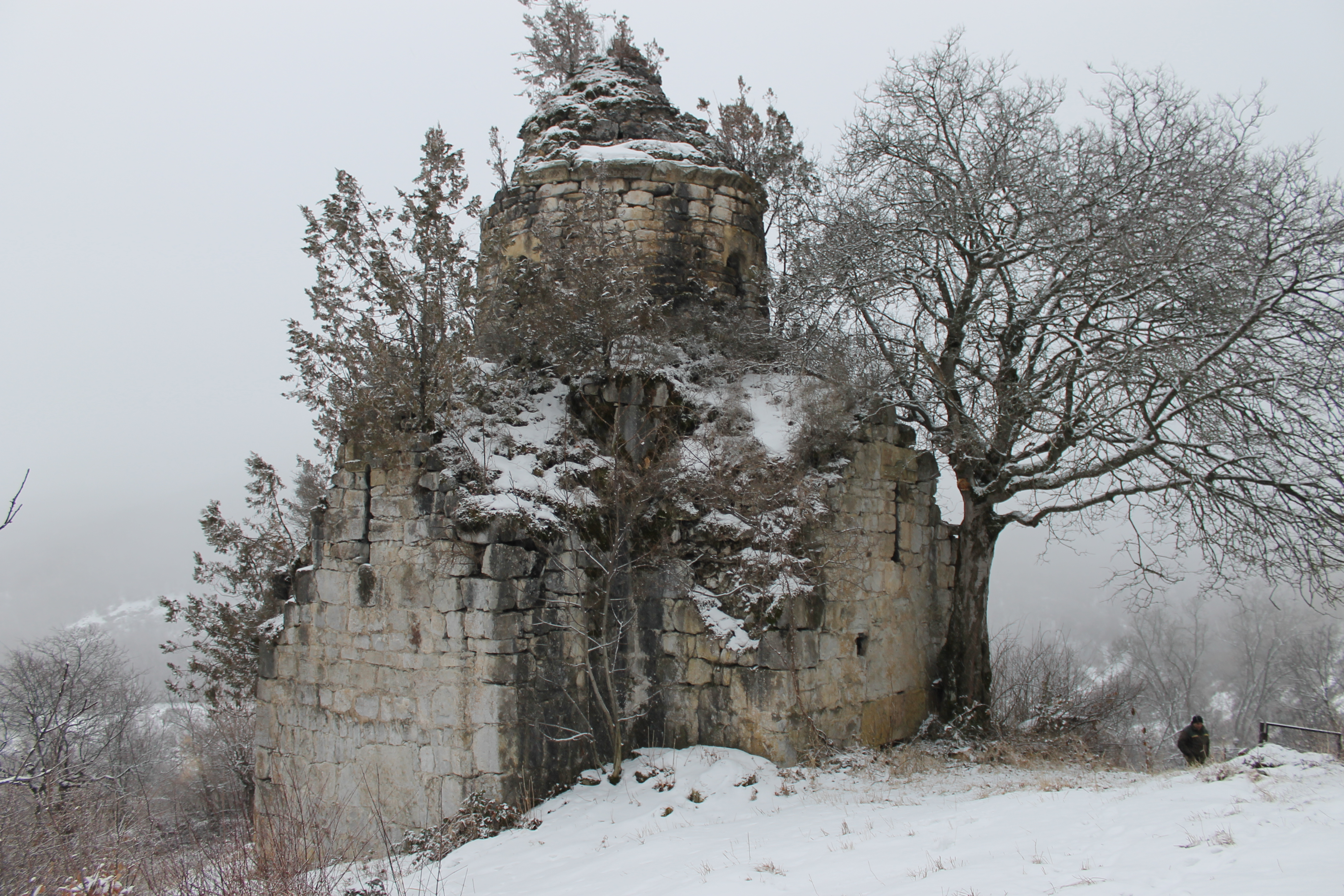
Khojorna church

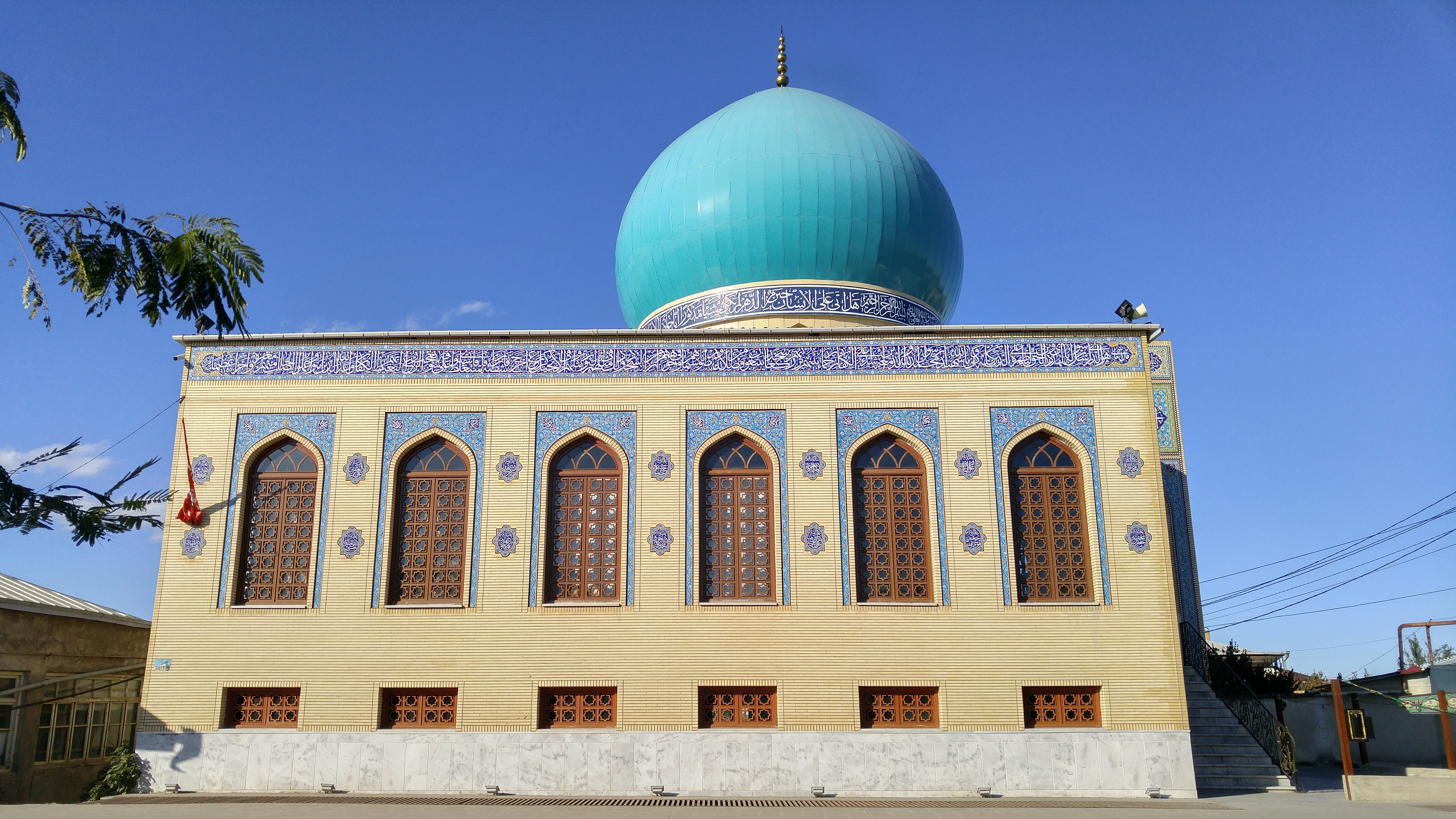
Imam-Husein Mosque in Marneuli

== Geography ==
Marneuli Municipality is situated in south-east part of country near to border with Azerbaijan and Armenia. The size of the municipality is 935 km^{2}. Most part of its territory is located in Marneuli lowland (between 350 and 600 meters above sea level). The highest point is Garadagh mountain (1416 m.).

Marneuli municipality is located in the eastern part of Kvemo Kartli. Its administrative center is the city of Marneuli. Marneuli borders Bolnisi Municipality to the west, Tetritskaro Municipality to the north, Gardabani Municipality to the northeast, Azerbaijan and Armenia to the south. The central part of the municipality is surrounded by the accumulated plains of Marneuli. The Iaghluji highland forms the geographic northern boundary of the municipality, while the southern geographic boundary is shaped by the Babakari Ridge. The area of the municipality is characterized by a river network that flows from west to east into the Mtkvari bassin. The river Mtkvari flows along the eastern border of Marneuli. Other main rivers through the municipality are the Khrami and Algeti which join the Mtkvari river near the Azerbaijan border.

=== Climate ===
Flora and fauna in Marneuli are diverse. In the area beard grass, thorny steppe, sparse, floodplain and semi-desert vegetation are common. Widespread medlar, sea buckthorn, maple, Georgian oak, blackthorn, etc. In the forests are inhabited badgers, wild boars, white breasted marten and others. In Marneuli almost everywhere can be found reed cat, rabbits, wolves and others. Ornithofauna is also abundant in the region, where you will find pheasants, partridge, partridge, skylark and many other birds. In the Marneuli municipality there is moderately dry subtropical warm steppe climate, with hot summers and mild cold winters. The average annual temperature is 12 °C, 0-0.3 °C in January and 24 °C in July.

== Administrative divisions ==
Marneuli Municipality is administratively divided into 17 communities (თემი, temi) with 77 villages (სოფელი, sopeli). There is one city (ქალაქი, kalaki). In 54 villages predominate ethnic Azeris, in 12 – Armenians, in 11 – Georgians.

- city: Marneuli;
- daba: none;
- villages: 77, such as Sadakhlo, Kizilajlo, Shaumiani, Akhkerpi, Aghmamedlo, Akhkula, Khojorni and Tekali.

The municipality has relatively large villages, which would have been labeled a daba in other municipalities. The two largest villages Sadakhlo and Kizilajlo have more than 7,000 residents. The former district capital Shaumiani was downgraded from daba to village in 2014.

== Population ==
The population of Marneuli Municipality is 107,824 according to the 2021 estimate, which is 3% increase from the last census of 2014 (104,300). The ethnic composition is 83.8% Azerbaijani, 8.6% Georgians and 7.0% Armenian. Small minority groups include Russians (0.2%) and Greek (0.1%). The population density is 115.3 people per square kilometer.

Population Marneuli Municipality
	1897	1922	1923	1926	1939	1959	1970	1979	1989	2002	2014	2021
Municipality Marneuli	-	-	-	-	48,970	▲72,155	▲91,054	▲99,867	▲124,332	▼118,221	▼104,300	▲107,824
Marneuli (Note: Until 1947 the city was called Borchalo.)	-	-	-	-	4,233	▲12,400	▲15,829	▲19,568	▲27,557	▼20,065	▲20,211	▲23,604
Shaumiani (village) (Note: Former capital of historic Borchaly district. The town was called Sjulaveri until 1925, and it degraded from daba to village in 2014.)	4,553	▲5,112	-	▲5,587	▲6,804	▲7,117	▼5,456	▲5,770	▲6,045	▼3,630	▼3,107	-
Data: Population statistics Georgia 1897 to present. Note: (Note: The 2014 census found an inexplicable gap with the data from the national statistical office Geostat. UN-assisted research has found the 2002 census was inflated by about 8-9 percent. See, "1. Introduction", Page 1.)

== Politics ==
Marneuli Municipal Assembly (Georgian: მარნეულის საკრებულო) is the representative body in Marneuli Municipality, consisting of 33 members which are elected every four years. The last election was held in October 2021. Kenan Omarov of Georgian Dream was elected as mayor.

Party	2017	2021	Current Municipal Assembly
Georgian Dream	31	27	
United National Movement	1	6	
European Georgia	3		
Total	35	33	

== Economy ==
After the collapse of Soviet Union economy of Marneuli broke down in ways similar to other regions of country. Soviet economic policies employed people in industries that could not survive competition in a free market and encouraged industrialization in areas where it did not belong. The Marneuli area is littered with polluted and abandoned factories that are the remnants of Soviet economic policy. At present Marneuli is known as agricultural region. In 2006 Marneuli owned share 78% of tobacco, 11% of vegetables and 4% of meat production around the Georgia. The largest employer in the Marneuli area is the Marneuli Food Company which bottles and sells items like pickles and ketchup.

== Culture ==
At present in Marneuli it is functioning 87 state and 1 non-state secondary school, 4 college, 4 high education enterprises (university), 67 libraries, 2 theaters, 2 museums and 1 TV.

=== Cultural Monuments ===
- The Monastery Complex - Khujabi
- Tserakvi Monastery Complex
- Tsopi Fortress in Sadakhlo
- Khojorna Church in Khojorni
- Binadzori Complex
- Shulaveri Fortress

== Transport ==
The S6 highway passes through the far northwest the capital Tbilisi via Bolnisi to the Armenian border. In Marneuli, S7 runs entirely within the territory of the municipality and branches off, reaching the Armenian border at Sadakhlo. Not far from the municipalities eastern border runs the S4 highway from Tbilisi between Rustavi and the Azerbaijani border.

The Tbilisi-Yerevan railway line, opened in 1899, runs north-south between Marneuli and Sadakhlo in the municipality. At Marneuli, a branch of the railway line branches off through Bolnisi towards Kazreti.

== Gallery ==
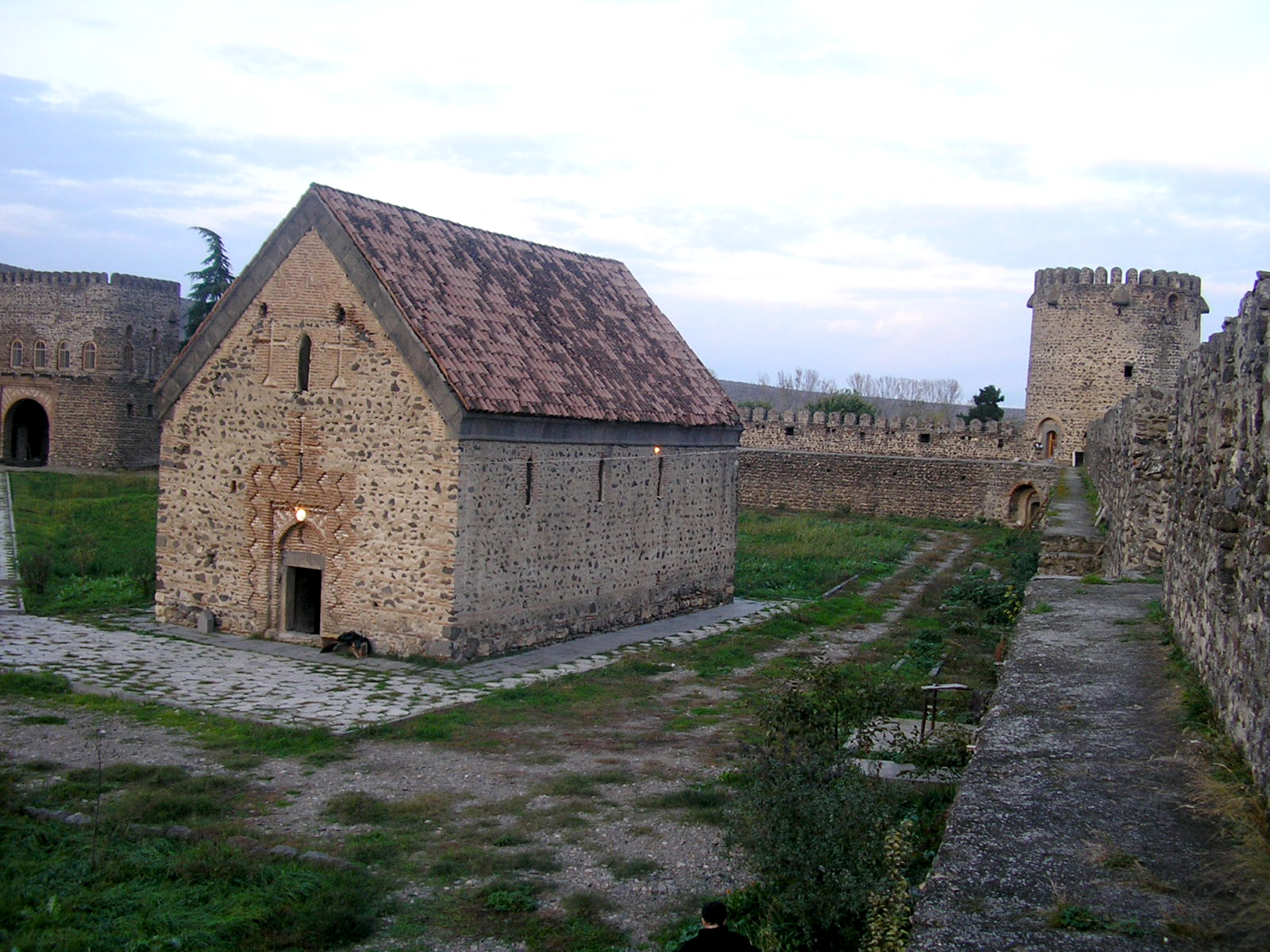

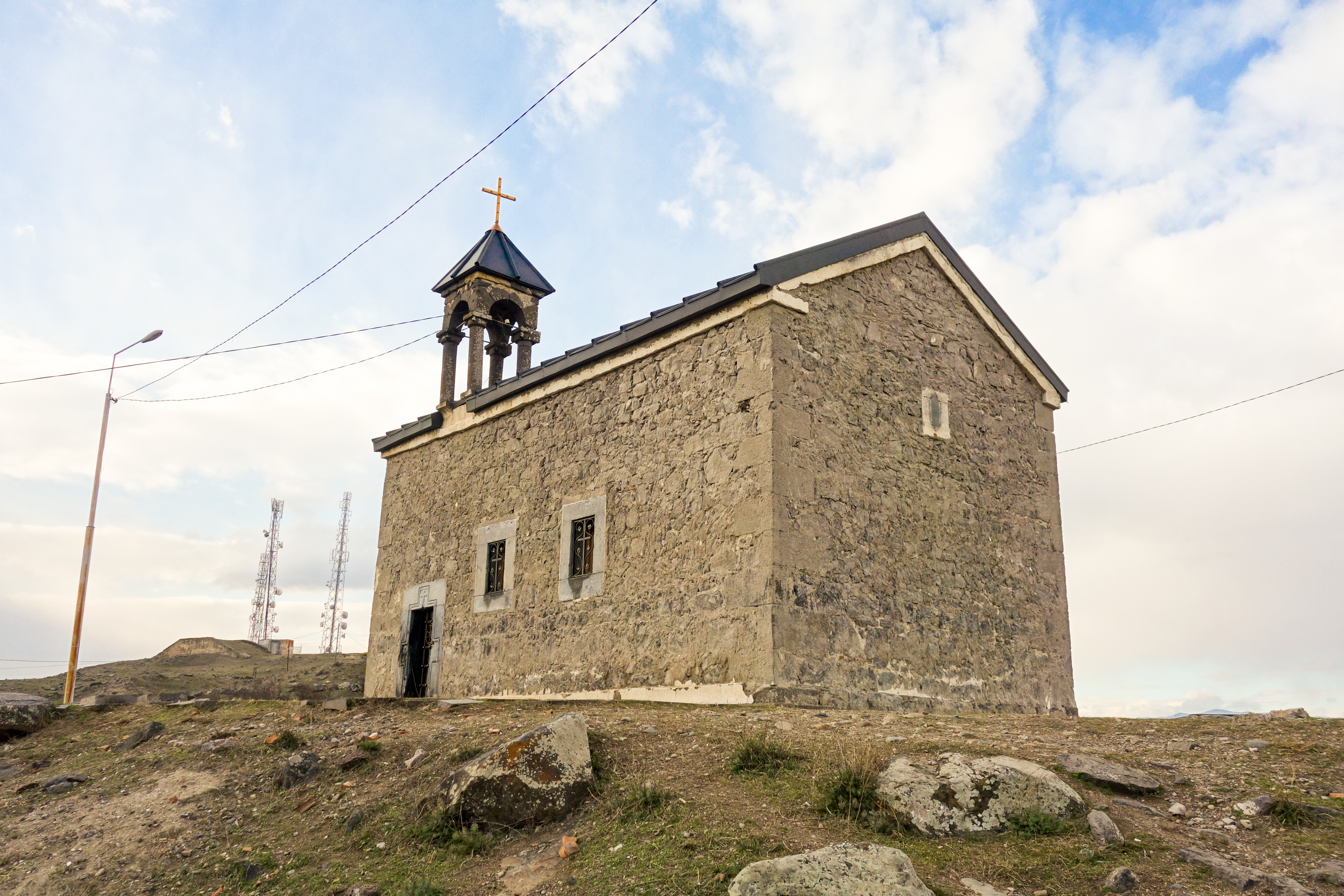
Church of St. George in Marneuli

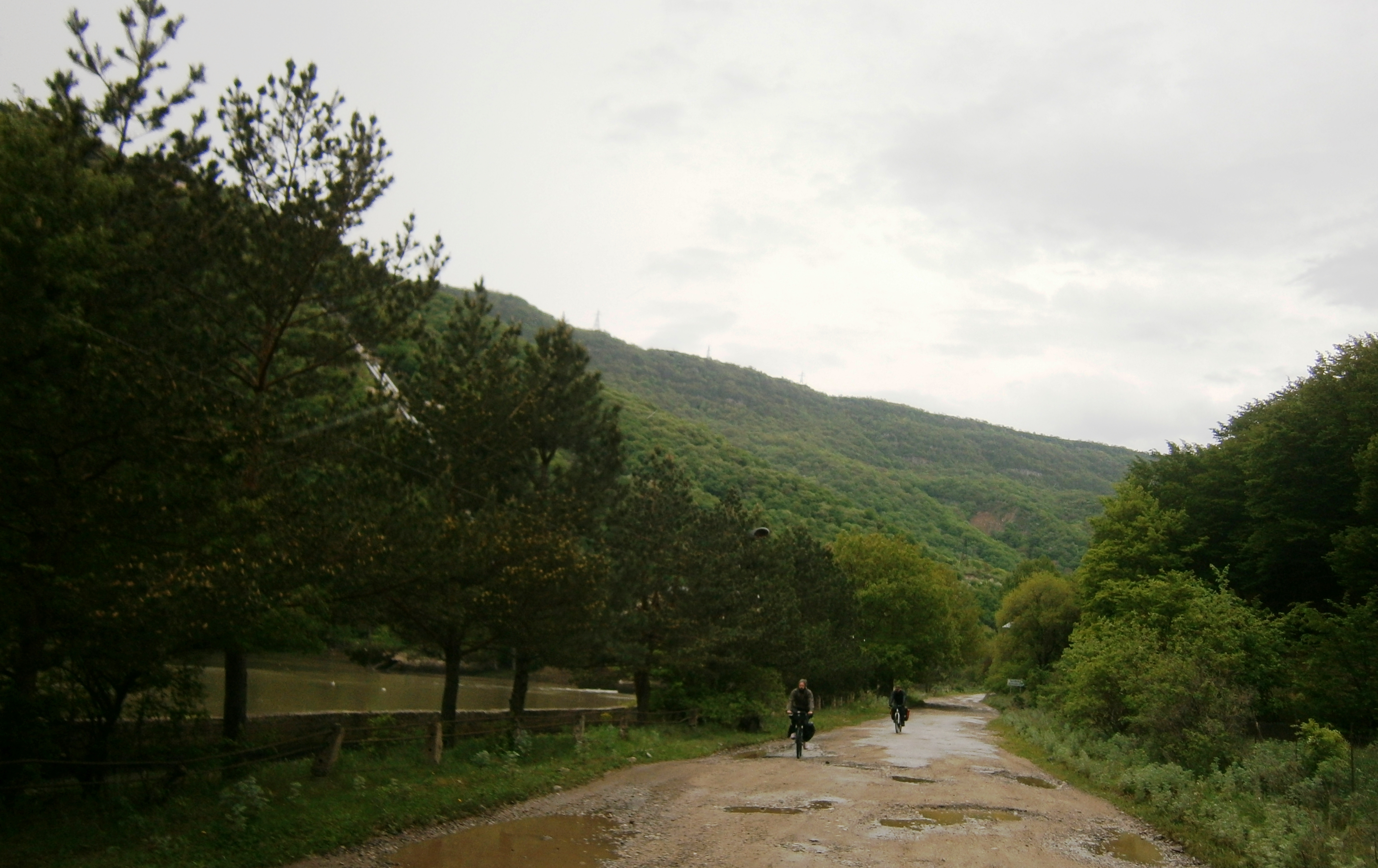
Marneuli-Tetritskaro-Tsalka highway

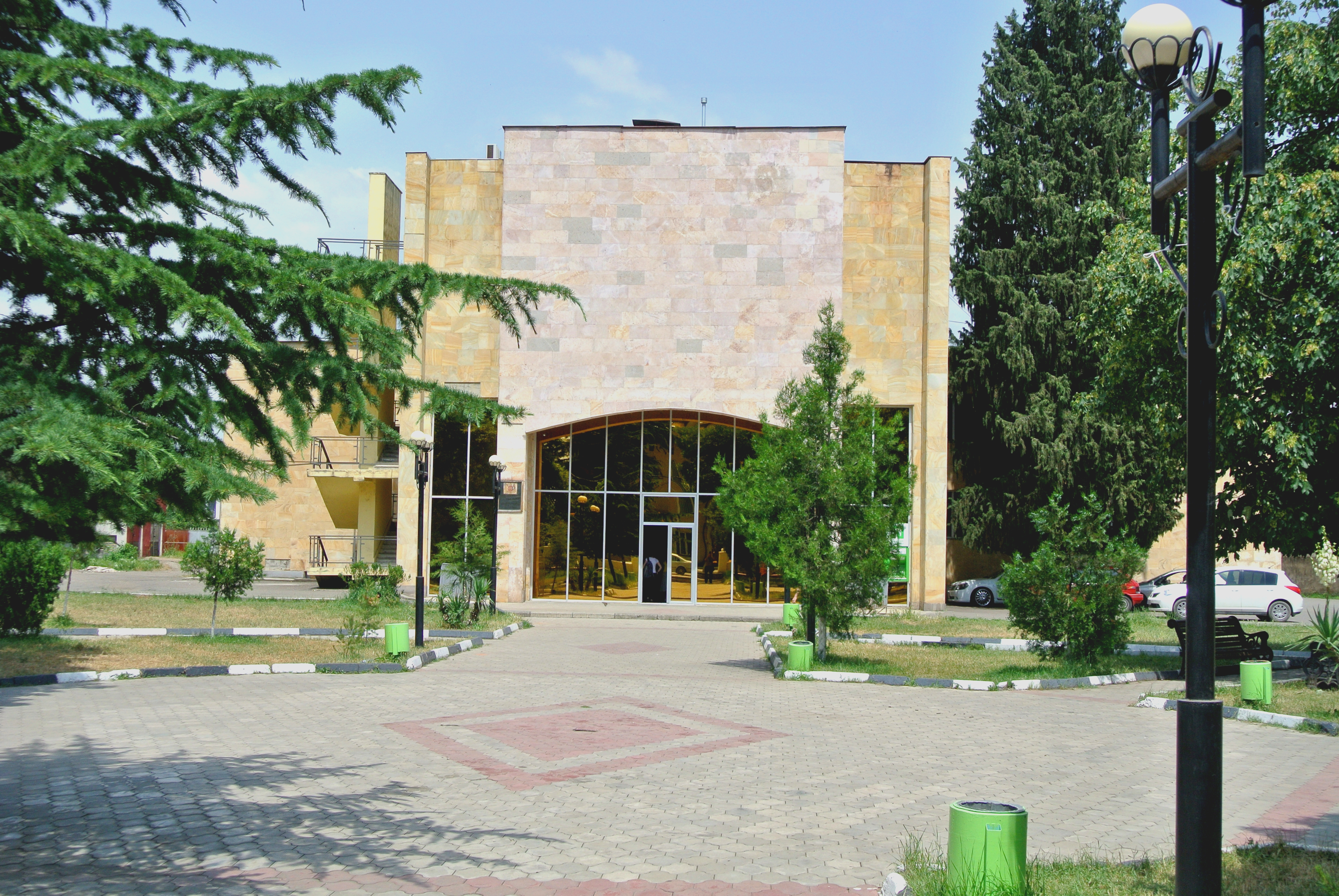
Marneuli Cultural Center
