= Veli bey Yadigar =

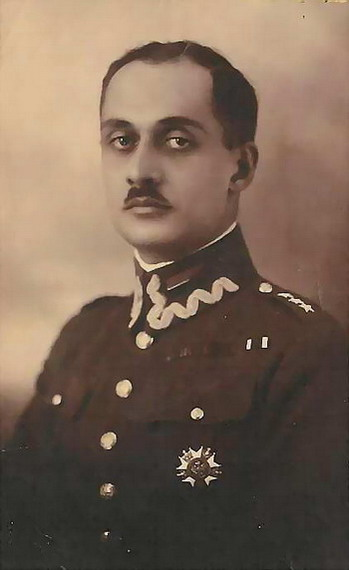
- Born: October 31, 1897; Tekali, Borchaly uezd, Tiflis Governorate (now Tbilisi, Georgia)
- Died: December 13, 1971 (aged 74) Buenos Aires, Argentina
- Buried: Powązki Tatar Cemetery, Poland
- Allegiance: Russian Empire; Azerbaijan Democratic Republic; Georgia; Poland; Home Army; Polish Armed Forces in the West
- Branch: Cavalry
- Service years: 1921 - 1946
- Rank: Colonel
- Commands: 10th Mounted Rifle Regiment; 7th Regiment of Lublin Lancers
- Conflicts: World War I; Brusilov offensive; 1920 Ganja revolt; World War II; Warsaw Uprising

Veli bey Yadigar (Azerbaijani: Vəli bəy Yadigar; Polish: Veli bek Jedigar; Russian: Вели-бек Едигар; 31 October 1897 – 13 December 1971), also known as Veli bey Yadigarov (Azerbaijani: Vəli bəy Yadigarov; Polish: Veli bek Jedigaroff; Russian: Вели-бек Едигаров), was a soldier of the Imperial Russian Army and officer of the Azerbaijani Armed Forces, Polish Army in the Second Polish Republic and the Home Army. He served in different armed forces from 1916 until 1946, fighting in both World War I and World War II. In the interbellum Poland, he was promoted to commandant of the 7th Lublin Uhlan Regiment.

== Background ==
He was born on 31 October [O.S. 18 October] 1897 in the real estate of Tekali, Tiflis Governorate, Russian Empire, (now Georgia) in a noble Azerbaijani family of Yadigarovs. His father, Sadig bey Yadigarov was a landowner, his mother was Georgian princess Olga Rusieva-Korchibasheva. He had an elder brother Archil (b. 1889), who were apparently baptized as Orthodox.

== Education and service ==
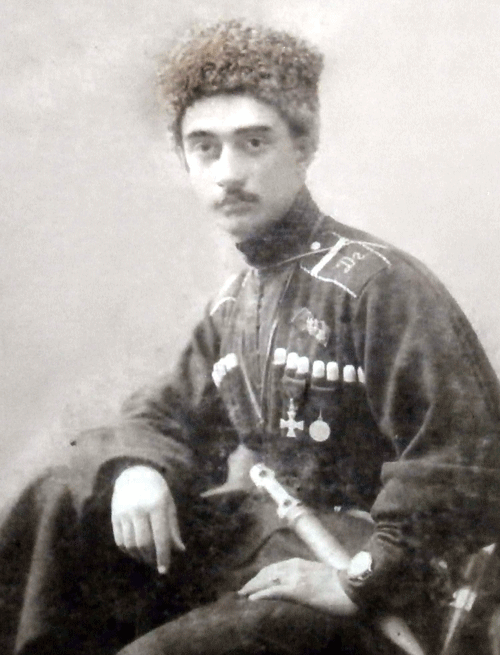
Vali bey Yadigarov as a young sergeant of the Imperial Russian Army with the Order of St. George

He attended a private gymnasium in Tiflis, graduating on 20 May [O.S. 7 May] 1914. After graduation, he briefly studied at Kyiv Polytechnic Institute, but changed his mind and joined Tiflis Cadet Corps, in 1916. Soon afterwards, together with Dagestan Cavalry Regiment, Jedigar was transported to the Eastern Front, to fight in the Brusilov Offensive. After its failure, Veli bey Yadigarov returned to Kiev, entering Kiev Artillery School in 1917. He was junker same year and later in view of the Bolshevik unrest and the Ukrainization (as well as of military units) of Kyiv, temporarily seconded to the regiment in Temir-Khan-Shura. Later that year he was seconded to the headquarters of the Caucasian Separate Muslim Corps and transferred to the 4th Cavalry Borchaly Regiment of Tatar Cavalry Regiment. He served in Caucasian Muslim Army as a senior officer in 1918. Later after establishment of Azerbaijan Democratic Republic, he went to serve in the army of the newly-formed nation on 5 April 1919.

The military leadership sent him to Karabakh to the 3rd Sheki Cavalry Regiment (based in Ganja) with him as a platoon commander. In 1919-1920, he was the commander of the machine-gun team of the 3rd Sheki Cavalry Regiment. He fought against the Armenian army near Çaylı and Bürc villages. He was promoted to senior lieutenant on 12 November 1919 and to captain on 28 February 1920. Following the Red Army invasion of Azerbaijan, Veli bey Yadigarov continued fighting against the Bolsheviks, later withdrawing with a division to Georgia on 15 June 1920. He was assigned to the emerging Georgian Tatar Division on 13 February 1921 and commanded its first squadron. Next year retreating with the Georgian army, he arrived with a squadron in Batum. He was later appointed as an officer for assignments under the Azerbaijani consulate in Constantinople, later emigrating to Poland with his younger brother Archil. In November 1922 he was officially accepted into the Polish Army, with the rank of the rittmeister.

== Life in Poland ==
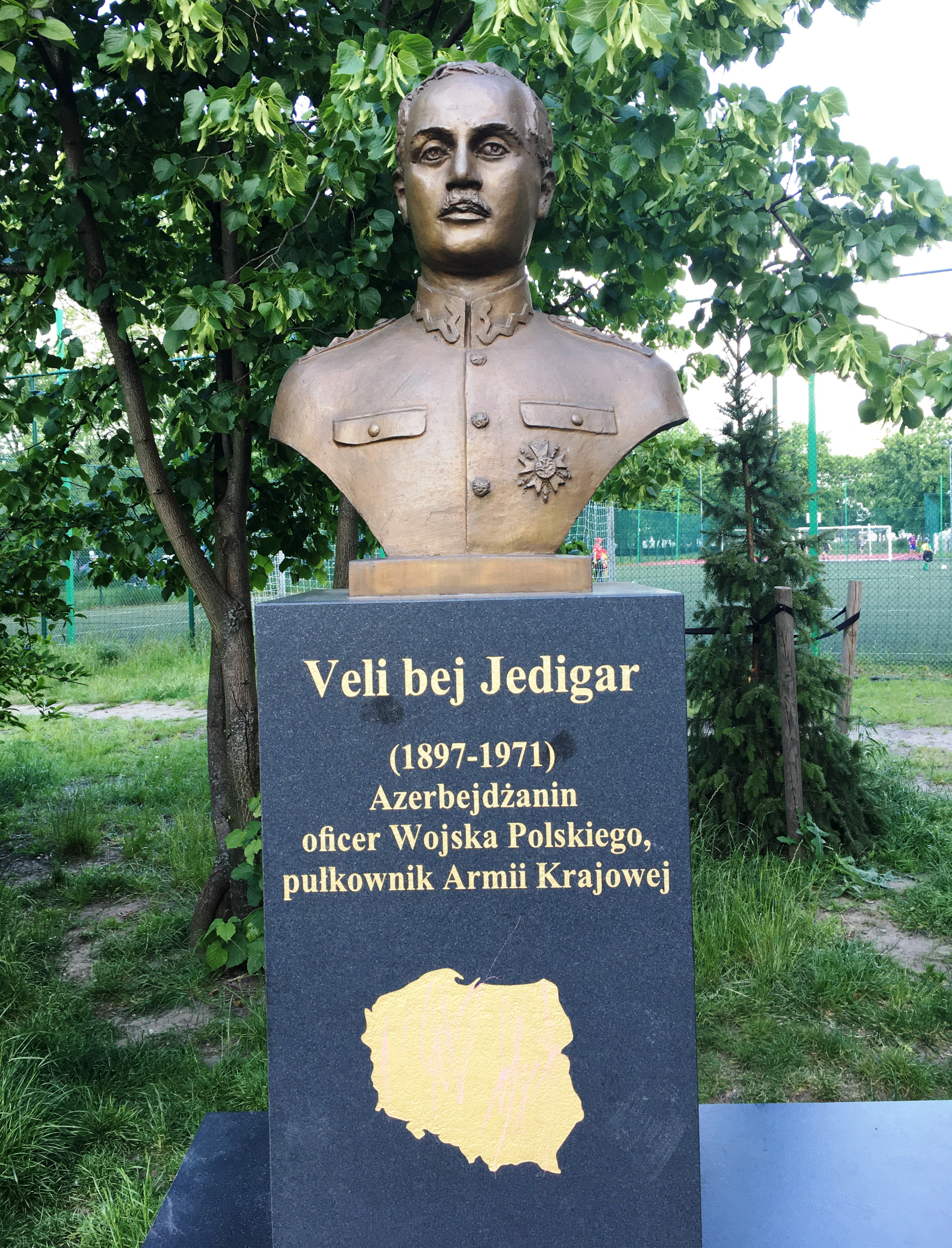
Monument of Veli bej Jedigar in Warsaw

In October 1924, Veli Bek Jedigar completed cavalry training for officers, at the Cavalry Training Center in Grudziądz, and in January 1925, he was sent to the 10th Mounted Rifles Regiment, stationed in Łańcut. His skills were appreciated by the military authorities, and the Azerbaijani soldier was quickly promoted. Furthermore, he was a protege of General Janusz Głuchowski, deputy minister of military affairs and commandant of the 7th Lublin Uhlan Regiment.

In June 1930, Veli Bek Jedigar completed the battalion commandant course at the Training Center in Rembertów. In 1932, he completed with distinction the Higher War School in Warsaw, and as a qualified officer, was sent to Baranowicze Cavalry Brigade. In 1934, he was promoted to major, and in 1936, was appointed commandant of the 7th Lublin Uhlan Regiment, stationed in Mińsk Mazowiecki.

In the 1930s, Veli Bek Jedigar became acquainted with several high-ranking officers of the Polish Army. As a result, he was supportive of the policies of the Sanacja regime (see also Piłsudski's colonels). Following personal request of Józef Piłsudski, he was an interpreter of a Turkish mission to Poland. After Piłsudski's death, he was selected as one of the soldiers to stand guard over the open casket.

In late August 1939, Veli Bek Jedigar was a lecturer at the Cavalry Training Center in Grudziądz, and a contract officer in the Masovian Cavalry Brigade. Following the Invasion of Poland, he joined the brigade as its chief of staff. Captured by the Germans as a POW, he was released due to his foreign ethnicity, and returned to Warsaw in August 1940. After return to Warsaw, he immediately became involved in Polish resistance activities. He formed conspirational 7th Lublin Uhlan Regiment, and commanded it since August 1940 until July 1944. He was respected by the Home Army authorities, and as a personal friend of General Tadeusz Bór-Komorowski, was responsible for cavalry training.

In mid-July 1944, Bór-Komorowski ordered him to leave occupied Poland and escape to the West, to avoid Soviet captivity. Veli Bek Jedigar, together with wife and daughter, went to Vienna, to return to Warsaw after the outbreak of Warsaw Uprising. He remained in occupied Poland until January 1945. In mid-1945, he reached Italy, joining 2nd Polish Corps. After some time, he left for Great Britain, and in 1949, together with the family, emigrated to Argentina. He was a very active member of different associations of Polish war veterans, and deputy chairman of Organization of Subjugated Nations Liberacion Europea.

Veli Bek Jedigar died of heart attack in Buenos Aires, on 13 December 1971. On 4 August 1990, his ashes were buried at Warsaw's Muslim Tatar Cemetery, during an official ceremony. His bust was unveiled in 2017 in the Józef Poliński park in Warsaw.

== Family ==
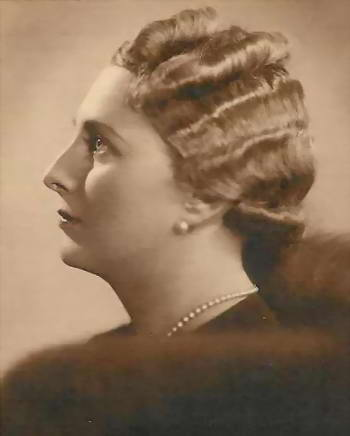
Wand Eminowicz, Polish wife of Veli bey

He married Wanda Eminowicz (1905-1954) in 1938, with whom he had a daughter, Zuleikha Jedigar-Kalinowska (born 1942).

== Works ==
- Outline of the military history of the Tatar Cavalry Regiment named after Colonel Mustafa Akhmatowicz (Polish: Zarys historii wojennej Tatarskiego Pułku Ułanów imienia pułkownika Mustafy Achmatowicza), Warsaw, 1933.
- Crimea in 1860 (Polish: Krym w 1860 roku) in Głos z Minarettu, 1949.

== Awards ==
- France - Croix de Guerre
- Russian Empire - Order of St. George (2nd, 3rd and 4th degrees)
- Azerbaijan Democratic Republic - "For Bravery"
- Poland - Gold Cross of Merit, Cross of Valour, Cross of the Home Army
- Ottoman Empire - War Medal, Order of the Medjidie 5th class with sword

== Sources ==
- Andrzej Krzysztof Kunert: Słownik biograficzny konspiracji warszawskiej 1939–1945 T.1. Warszawa: Instytut Wydawniczy PAX, 1987

== Links ==
- Zarys historii wojennej Tatarskiego Pułku Ułanów imienia pułkownika Mustafy Achmatowicza, book by Vali bey Yadigarov

== See also ==
- Islam in Poland
