= Tekali =

Tekali თექალი
- Location in Georgia Tekali (Kvemo Kartli)
- Coordinates: 41°21′4″N 44°58′35″E
- Country: Georgia
- Region: Kvemo Kartli
- Municipality: Marneuli
- Elevation: 310 m (1,020 ft)
- Climate: Cfa

Teqali (Təkəli; Georgian: თექალი) is a village in the Marneuli district, Kvemo Kartli, Georgia. As of the 2002 census, its population was 1,682, mostly ethnic Azerbaijani (100%).

Due to its proximity to both Georgian–Armenian and Georgian–Azerbaijani borders, Tekali was selected in July 2012 as the place of the civil hearings involving Azeri, Georgian, and Armenian civil society activists.

== See also ==
- Kvemo Kartli
