= Giuli Gegelia =

Professor Giuli Gegelia
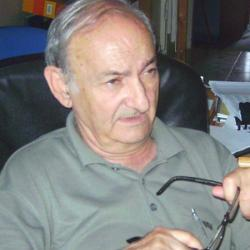
- Born: 20 July 1942 (age 83); Senaki, Georgia
- Occupation: Architect
- Awards: Honorary Architect of Georgia; The Best Realised Project of 2007
- Buildings: Poti City Court; Erekle II Street Tbilisi; Renovation and rehabilitation of historic zones in Sighnaghi and Mtskheta; Reconstruction of Meitar Bath, Abanotubani; Renovation of Rustaveli Theatre; Reconstruction of Kutaisi Court

Professor Giuli Gegelia (Georgian: გიული გეგელია) (born 20 July 1942) is a Georgian architect, Professor of Architecture at the Georgian Technical University, since 1998, and member of the Executive Board of the Union of Georgian Architects. In 2008, Professor Gegelia was awarded the prestigious Honorary Architect of Georgia title. Gegelia has served as an independent architectural expert, as part of various selective commissions and juries, providing architectural advice to the Ministry of Culture and Sport and the Ministry of Education of Georgia on a wide range of issues such as restoration of historic heritage sites or standard of educational institutions. Giuli Gegelia was one of the architects employed, by the Government of Georgia and the Foundation for the Preservation of Cultural Heritage Sites of Georgia, to design the rehabilitation and restoration of historic zones of Sighnaghi, Mtskheta and Batumi, as part of the wider initiative of the Georgian Government to implement massive restoration works of historic zones. Professor Gegelia has authored 9 papers regarding the restoration and reconstruction of Old Tbilisi and has published 16 articles in Georgian, Polish and Russian magazines.

== Early life and career ==
Giuli Gegelia was born in Senaki, western Georgia to the family of Grigol Gegelia, a combat medic during the Second World War and later the Chief Doctor of Menji Sanatorium, and Margarita Khocholava, ophthalmologist. Having completed secondary education with a Golden Medal, Gegelia read architecture at the Georgian Technical University, graduating in 1965. In the period between 1968 and 1998, he held various positions in the Faculty of Architecture, including Senior Teacher, and received professorship in 1998.

== Selected publications ==
- My ne moźem dat' vse ego proizvedenija, nuźen vybor
- Proekty, upomjanutye v konce Vaśego teksta ne realizovany, da? Znaćit, ich ne nado dat'
- Stil' novych rabot?
- Architektur der DDR GOD? (12) 745-752

== See also ==
- Architecture of Georgia (country)
- Grigol Gegelia
- Gandzieli-Gegelia
