= Poles in Georgia =

Polish diaspora in Georgia

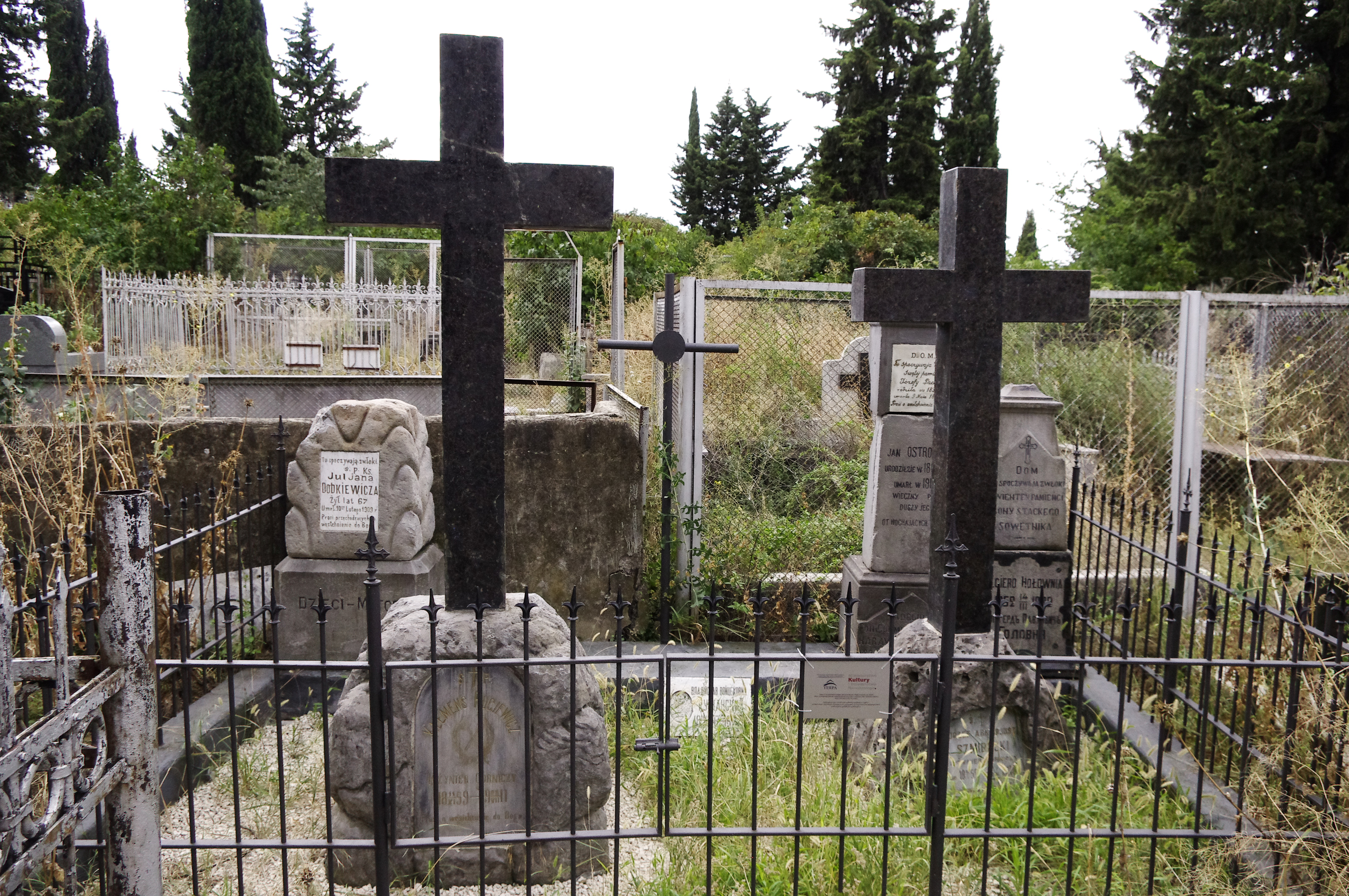
- Polish quarter at the Kuki cemetery in Tbilisi

Total population
- 6,000 (2007, est.)

Languages
- Polish, Georgian

Poles in Georgia form a population estimated at 6,000 (as of 2007), and are part of the Polish diaspora of the Caucasus region. Polish presence in Georgia dates back to the 18th century.

== History ==
In the late 18th century, Poland lost its independence in the course of the Partitions of Poland, and its territory was annexed by Prussia (later Germany), Russia and Austria, while Georgia was annexed by Russia in the 19th century. Already in 1794, the Russians were sending captured Polish prisoners of war from the Kościuszko Uprising to the Caucasus region, including Georgia. Following the partitions and then following the unsuccessful Polish November Uprising of 1830–1831, many Poles who were forcibly conscripted to the Russian Army were sent to Georgia. Since the 1830s, Polish officials, teachers, midwives, craftsmen, merchants and doctors also settled in Georgia, and many married local Georgians. About 4,000 Poles, mostly soldiers, lived in Georgia as of 1840. By the mid-19th century, Polish communities existed in various Georgian cities, including Tbilisi, Kutaisi, Gori, Signagi, and Telavi. In 1870 a Polish Catholic church was built in Tbilisi, which served its Polish community. Poles in Georgia were under the watchful eye of the Russian authorities, as they were constantly considered a potential threat.

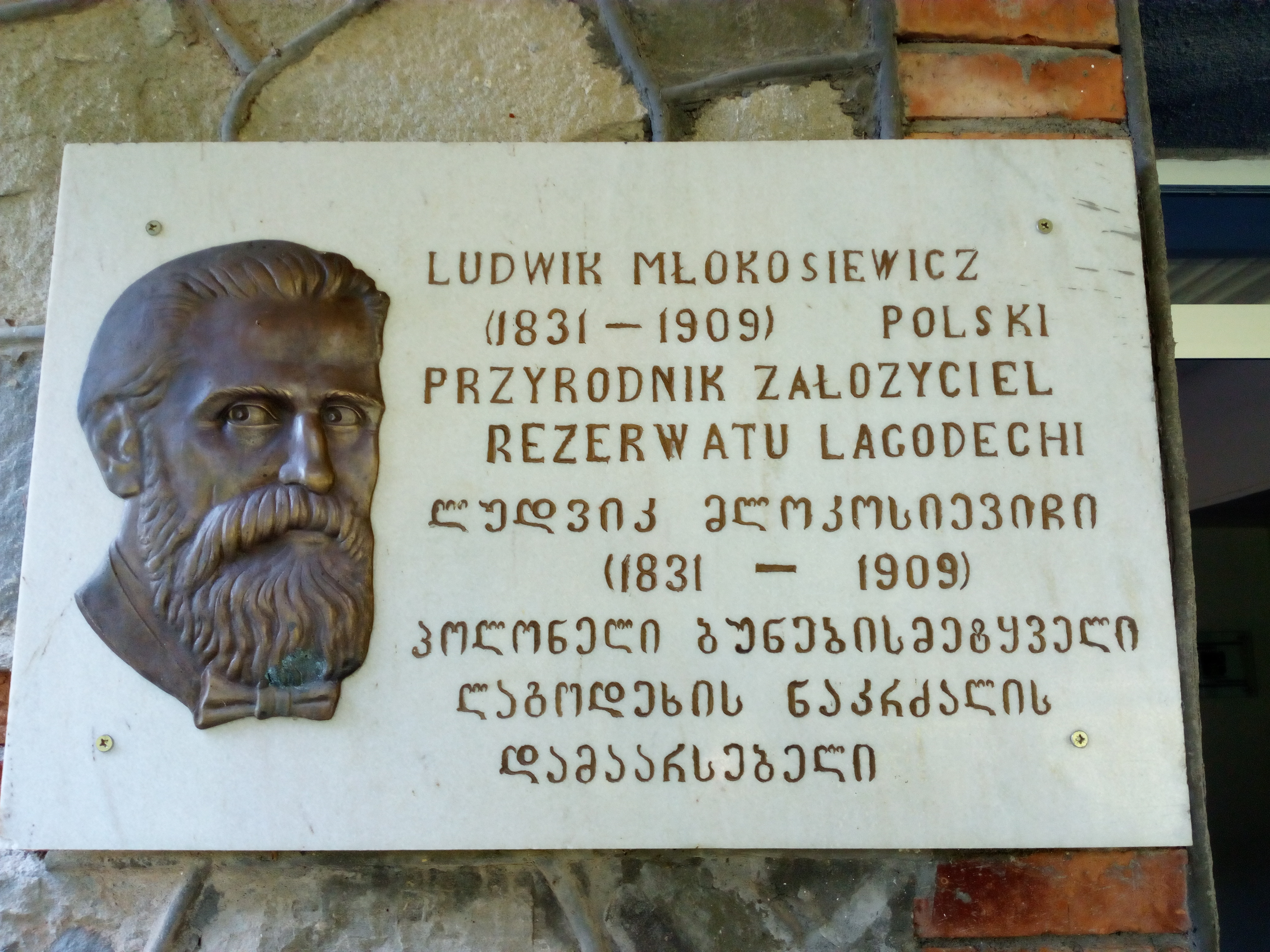
Memorial plaque to Ludwik Młokosiewicz in Lagodekhi

Poles made great contributions in the fields of architecture, geography, arts, botany and zoology in Georgia. In the 1840s, Pole Władysław Bahrynowski established a botanical garden in Sukhumi. Great contributions to the botany and zoology of Georgia were made by Ludwik Młokosiewicz, a Pole, who initially came to Lagodekhi in 1853 to do his compulsory military service in the Russian Army, but eventually stayed permanently. Młokosiewicz discovered various species of plants and animals on Georgian soil, and founded the Lagodekhi Protected Areas. He invented a method to eradicate malaria in Georgia, which earned him widespread respect among the Georgian people. Młokosiewicz also expanded the knowledge of Georgian fauna and flora in Poland by maintaining contacts with museums and institutions in Warsaw, to which he sent Georgian botanical and zoological specimens, as well as through scientific publications.

Józef Chodźko conducted pioneering geographical and geodetic surveys of Georgian lands. Polish architects worked in various Georgian cities, including Tbilisi, Kutaisi, Batumi, Poti and Sukhumi, designing many residential houses as well as theaters, schools, courts, incl. the present Supreme Court of Georgia. Aleksander Szymkiewicz even became a city councillor and the municipal architect of Tbilisi, while Józef Kognowicki became the municipal engineer of Tbilisi, responsible for constructing the city's modern water supply and sewage system. Polish architects were also involved in the restoration of historic Georgian churches, and contributed to the construction of roads and railroads and the expansion of seaports in Poti, Batumi and Sukhumi. Ferdynand Rydzewski headed the construction of the Surami Tunnel under the Surami Pass, the longest railroad tunnel in the Caucasus. Before 1914 about 500 Poles were employed in the construction of railroads, roads, bridges, public buildings and pipelines on Georgian lands.

Polish artists (musicians, writers, painters) also lived in Georgian cities, some being founders or co-founders of art schools in Tbilisi. Polish painter Zygmunt Waliszewski spent his youth in Batumi and Tbilisi, and the first years of his career in Tbilisi, before returning to Poland after it regained independence.

=== Interbellum and World War II ===
Historical population
Year	Pop.	±%
1939	3,167	—
1959	2,702	−14.7%
1970	2,565	−5.1%
1979	2,200	−14.2%
1989	2,014	−8.5%

As a result of repatriation of Poles to reborn independent Poland after World War II, their number in Georgia decreased from over 15,000 in 1914 to 3,000 in 1926. Poles in Georgia were among the victims of the so-called Polish Operation and Kulak Operation, carried out by the Soviet Union during the Great Purge in 1937–1938. Among the victims was painter, graphic artist and illustrator Henryk Hryniewski.

After Operation Barbarossa in 1941, many Polish refugees from Soviet-occupied eastern Poland ended up in Georgia, where they encountered local Poles as well as friendly Georgians. After the Sikorski–Mayski agreement, the Polish embassy in Moscow was allowed to establish local offices in the Georgian SRR and organize care for the Polish population in Georgia. Many Poles then joined the newly formed Anders' Army. In July 1942 the Soviets liquidated the Polish offices in Georgia and then mostly arrested their officials in order to replace them with newly formed puppet Polish structures, subordinated to the communist authorities. During the war, about 10,000 Polish refugees ended up in Georgia, however their number gradually decreased, as many Poles joined the Anders' Army, then the First Polish Army and also returned to Poland. According to official data, in January 1945 there were still 1,879 registered refugees from Poland in Georgia. After the war, in the years 1946–1948, 3,000 people were repatriated from Georgia to Poland.

== Architecture ==
Notable buildings designed by Polish architects include:

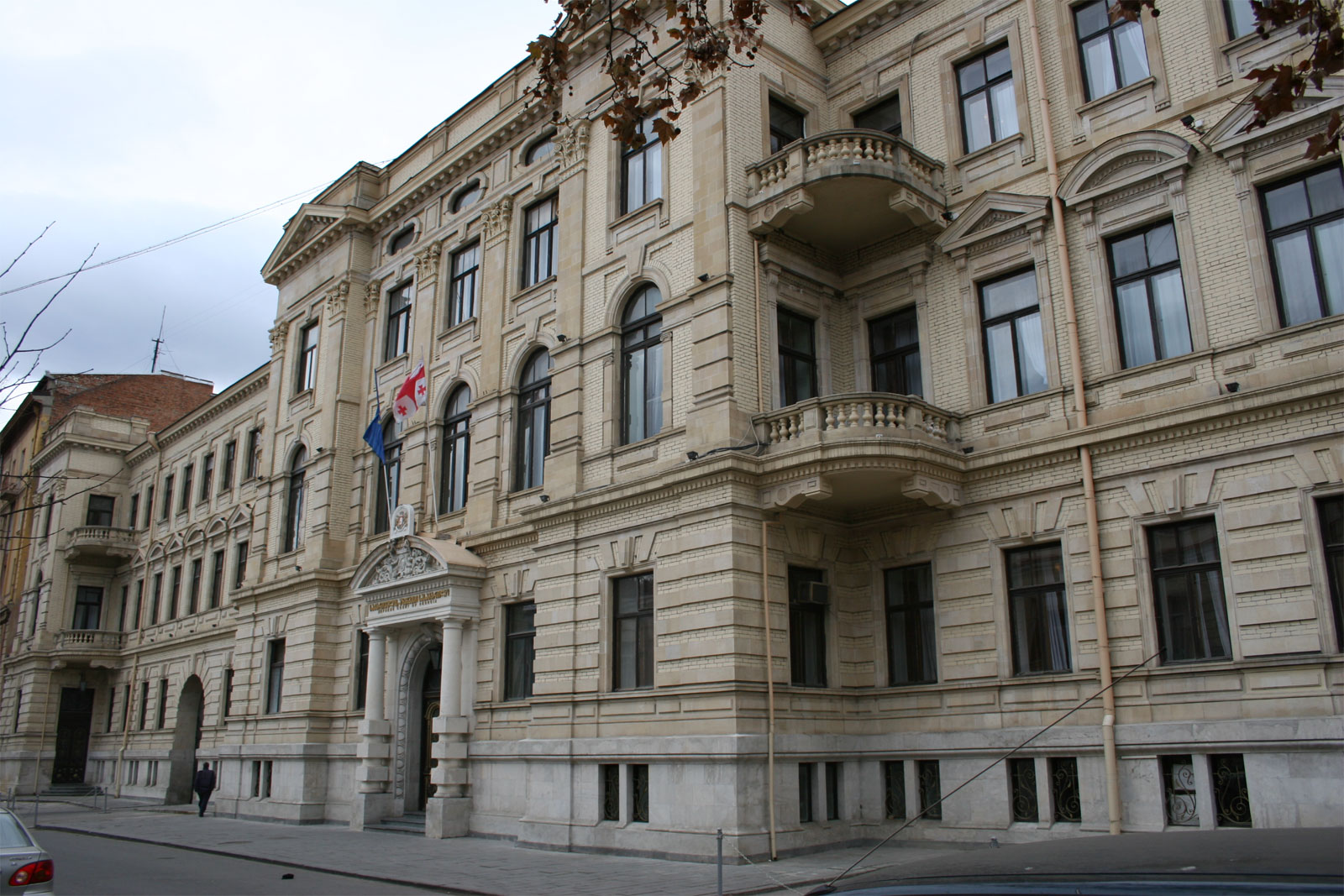
Supreme Court of Georgia in Tbilisi, by Aleksander Szymkiewicz

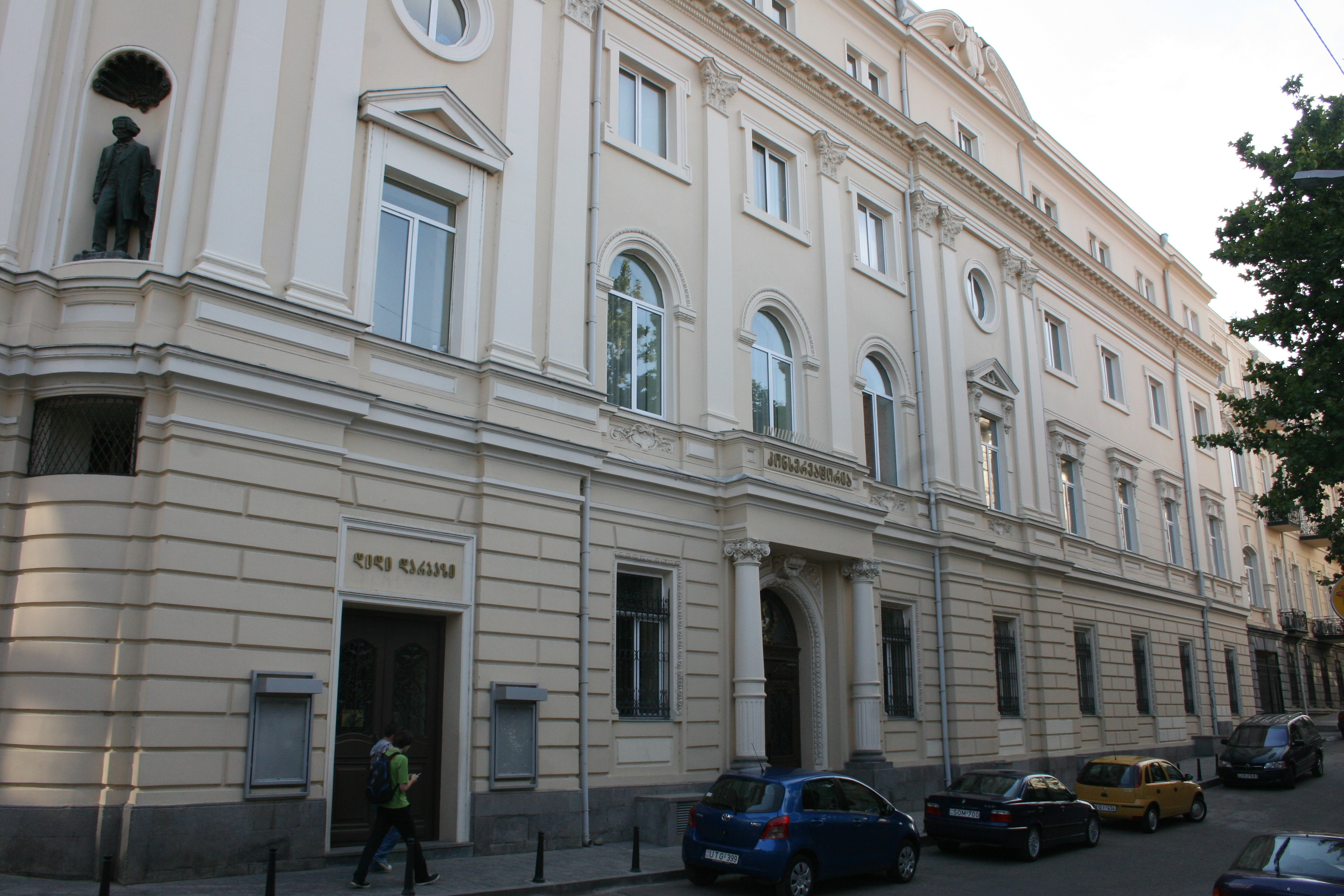
Tbilisi State Conservatoire, by Szymkiewicz

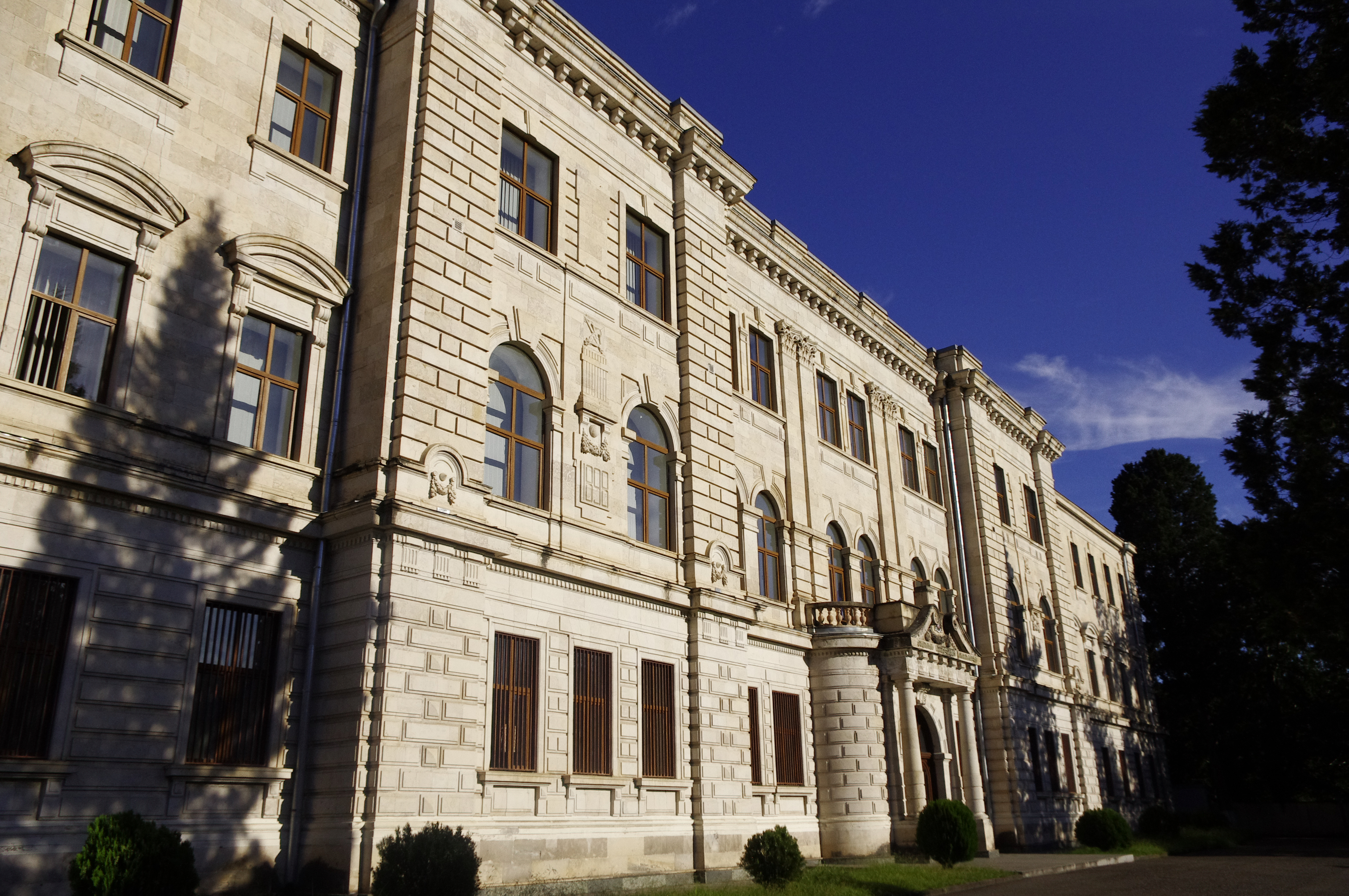
Court of Appeals in Kutaisi, by Szymkiewicz

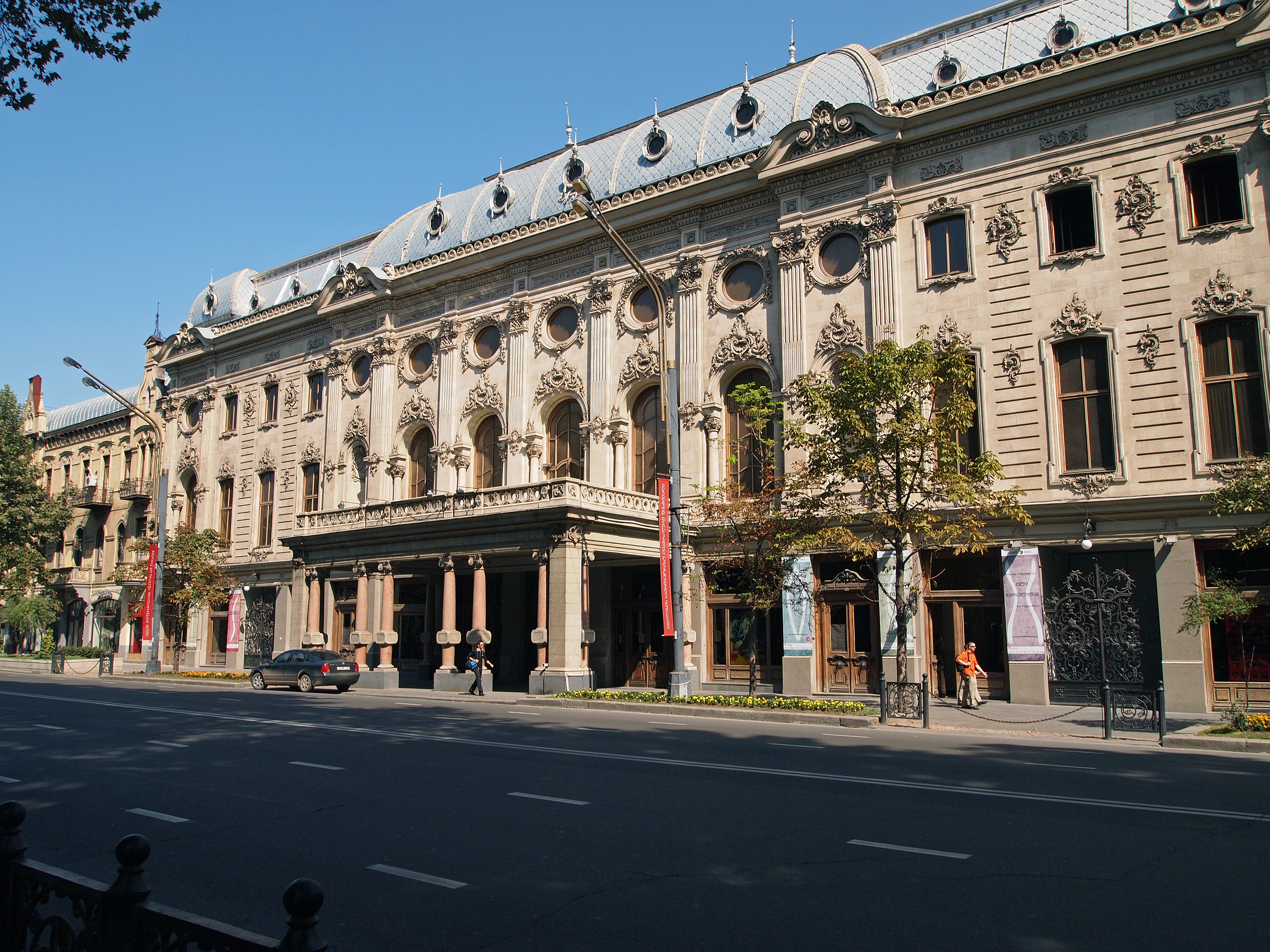
Rustaveli Theatre in Tbilisi, by Szymkiewicz

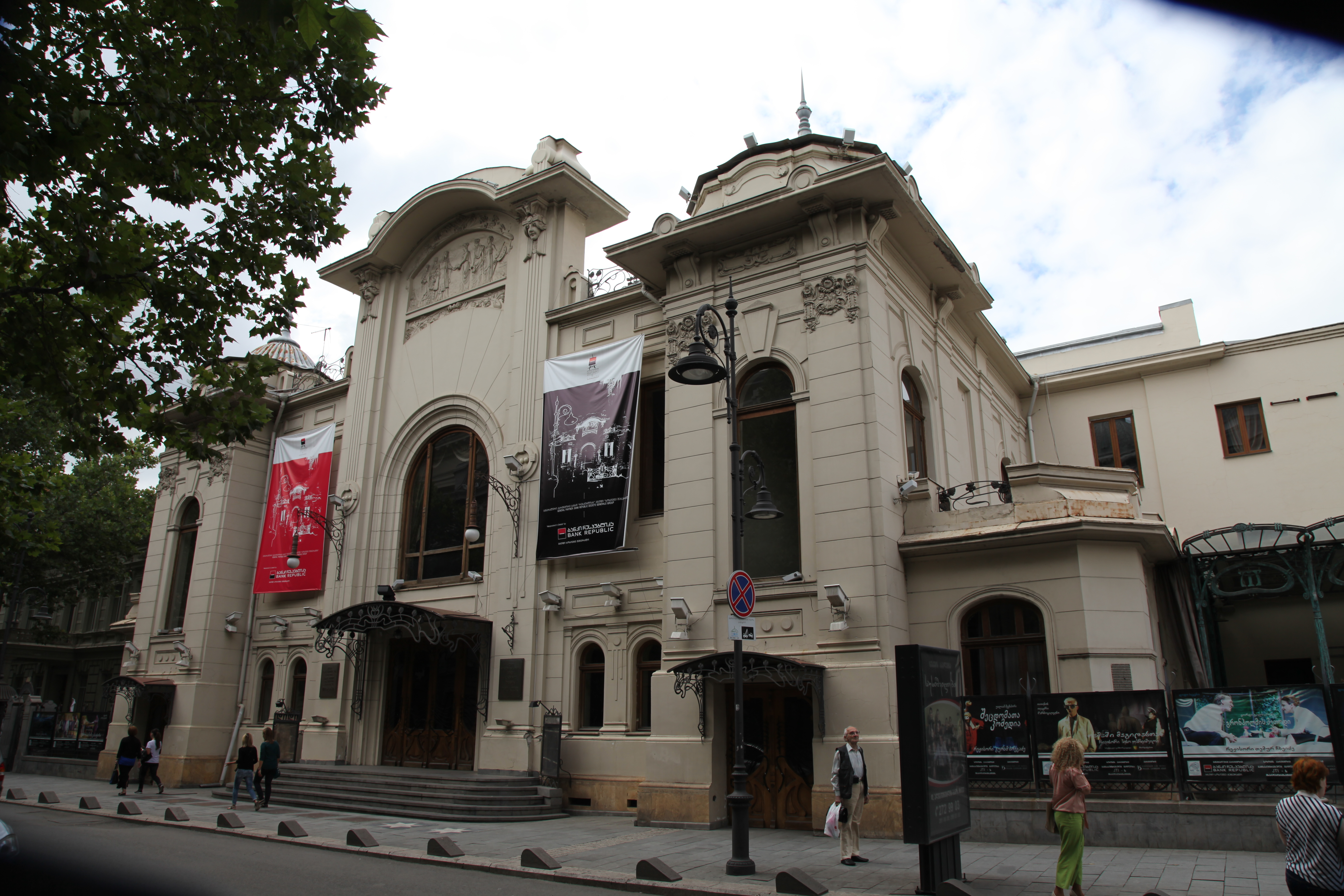
Marjanishvili Theatre in Tbilisi, by Stefan Kryczyński

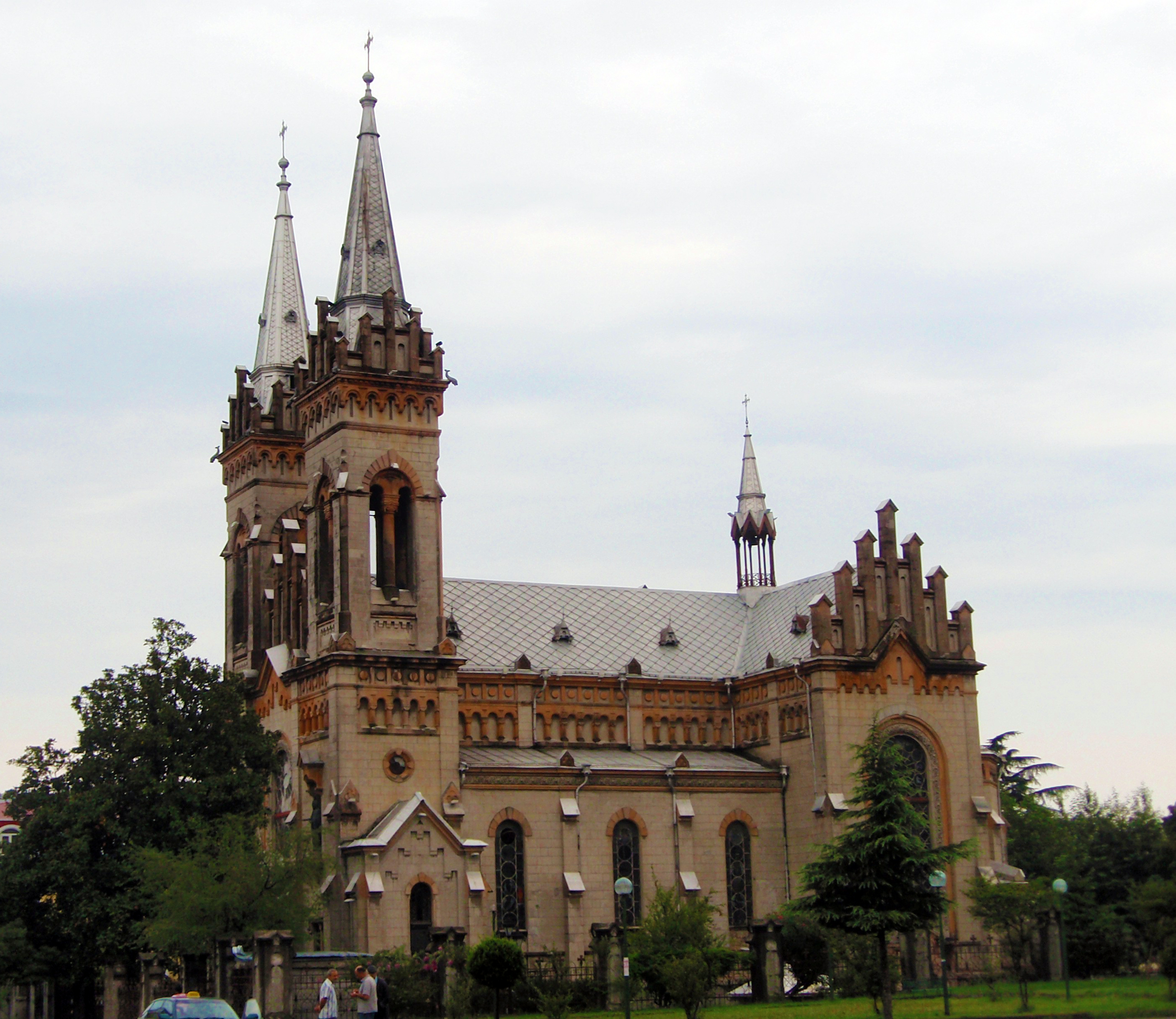
Batumi Cathedral of the Mother of God, by Aleksander Rogojski

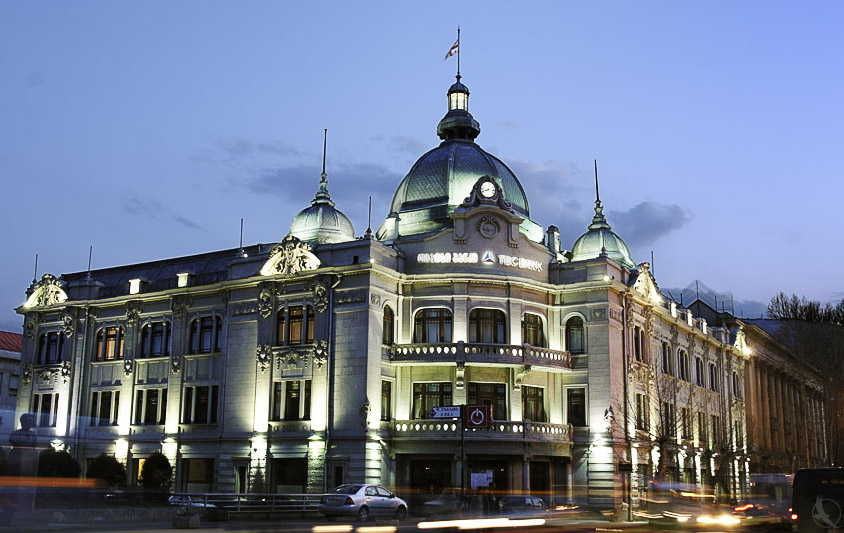
TBC Bank headquarters in Tbilisi, by Rogojski

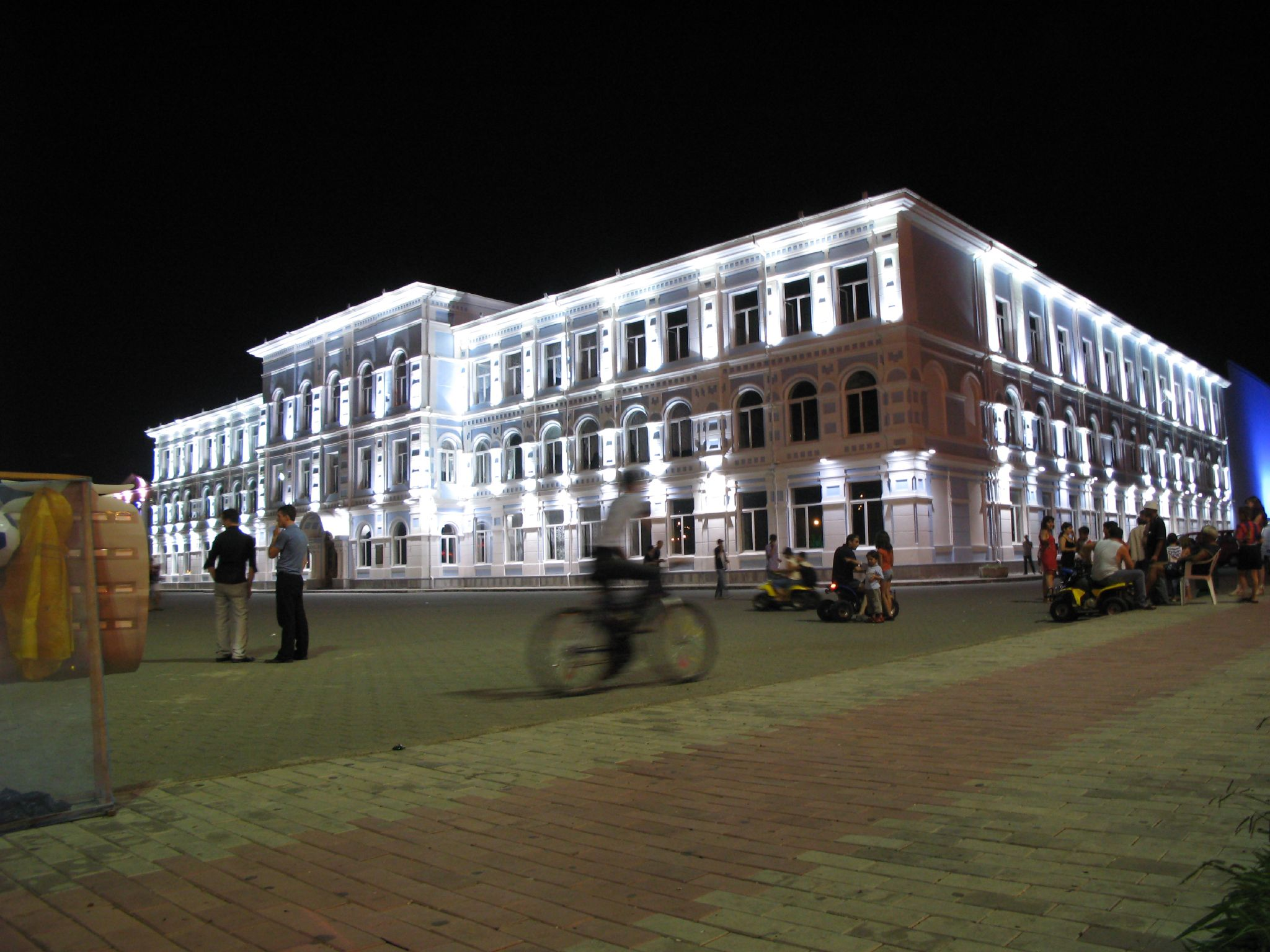
Shota Rustaveli State University building in Batumi, by Szymkiewicz

== Notable people ==
- Ludwik Młokosiewicz (1831–1909), explorer, zoologist, botanist
- Aleksander Szymkiewicz (1858–1908), architect, municipal architect of Tbilisi
- Henryk Hryniewski (1869–1937), painter, graphic artist, illustrator
- Zygmunt Waliszewski (1897–1936), painter

== See also ==
- Georgia–Poland relations
- Georgians in Poland
- Ethnic groups in Georgia
- Polish diaspora
- Poles in Armenia
- Poles in Azerbaijan
- Poles in Russia

== Bibliography ==
- Chodubski, Andrzej (1982). "Ludwik Młokosiewicz (1831–1909) – pionier badań flory i fauny Kaukazu". Kwartalnik Historii Nauki i Techniki (in Polish). No. 27/2.
- Głowacki, Albin (1992). "O uchodźcach polskich w Gruzji w latach II wojny światowej". In Kolbaja, Dawid (ed.). Pro Georgia II (in Polish). Warszawa: Towarzystwo Gruzińsko-Polskie. ISBN 83-900527-1-7.
- Woźniak, Andrzej (1998). "Polacy w Gruzji w pierwszej połowie XIX wieku". Niepodległość i Pamięć (in Polish) (5/2 (11)). Muzeum Niepodległości w Warszawie. ISSN 1427-1443.
- Wojtasiewicz, Wojciech (2012). "Wkład Polaków w rozwój Gruzji w drugiej połowie XIX i na początku XX wieku". In Stawowy-Kawka, Irena (ed.). Międzycywilizacyjny dialog w świecie słowiańskim w XX i XXI wieku (in Polish). Kraków: Księgarnia Akademicka. ISBN 978-83-7638-199-2.
