= Occupation of Senaki =

2008 military operation in Georgia

- Part of the Russo-Georgian War
Date	11 August – 22 August 2008
Location	Senaki, Samegrelo-Zemo Svaneti, Georgia
Result	Russian seizure of Georgian military hardware, destruction of the Senaki military base
Territorial changes	Occupation of Senaki by Russian soldiers, later withdrawal

Belligerents
Russia	Georgia

Commanders and leaders
Maj. Gen. Sergey Chaban	Brig. Gen. Alexander Kiknadze

Strength
30 armored vehicles, 20 truckloads of Russian troops (according to Batu Kutelia)	2nd Infantry Brigade (Note: Retreated before occupation.)

Casualties and losses
None (Georgians left without a battle)	Personnel losses: 12 troops killed, 14 wounded (Note: One later died in a hospital.); 21 captured (temporarily brought to Senaki from Poti); Equipment and material losses: 2 helicopters (according to Russian sources); Some ammunition destroyed or seized; Several hangars destroyed
- At least two dozen people killed (as part of wider Poti raids)

The Occupation of Senaki was a military operation during the Russo-Georgian War in which Russian forces captured and temporarily occupied the city of Senaki and its military base in western Georgia.

== Background ==
Senaki hosts a major Georgian military base and airfield located approximately 30 kilometers from the boundary with Abkhazia. Prior to the war, the base had been upgraded to NATO standards with support from the United States and served as a key hub for Georgian military infrastructure in western Georgia.

== Military operations ==
=== Advance and capture ===
On 11 August 2008, following the opening of a western front from Abkhazia, Russian forces advanced into undisputed Georgian territory toward Senaki.

A journalist from The New York Times had reported sightings of Russian military vehicles near Senaki as early as 10 August, indicating preparations for the advance.

Russian forces issued an ultimatum to Georgian troops near the Abkhaz boundary to disarm. Georgian forces subsequently withdrew from Senaki, reportedly to avoid confrontation following aerial bombardment.

Russian armored columns then advanced approximately 30 kilometers and captured the Senaki military base and airfield.

The capture was strategically significant, as Senaki lies on the main east–west highway and rail line, enabling control over major transport routes and isolating the Black Sea port of Poti.

=== Destruction of military infrastructure ===
Russian officials stated that the operation aimed to neutralize military equipment at the base. During the occupation, Russian troops destroyed significant quantities of Georgian military hardware and infrastructure, including recently upgraded facilities.

Reports on 14 August indicated that Russian forces were removing usable ammunition while destroying remaining stockpiles with controlled explosions. According to Russian sources, aircraft also destroyed two Georgian helicopters (reported as Mi-8 and Mi-24) at the airbase during the initial phase of the operation.

=== Occupation period ===
Georgian officials stated that approximately 30 armored vehicles and more than 20 truckloads of Russian troops were involved in the occupation.

On 19 August, Russian forces detained 21 Georgian servicemen in Poti and transported them to Senaki; they were released later the same day in a prisoner exchange.

Russian military officials later stated that their presence in Senaki was intended to eliminate threats to Abkhaz territory and Russian peacekeepers. On 25 August, Russian Deputy Chief of the General Staff Anatoliy Nogovitsyn claimed that Georgian forces had abandoned Senaki, prompting Russian forces to enter the area.

== Withdrawal ==
Following a six-point ceasefire agreement, Russian forces began withdrawing from Senaki and other areas of undisputed Georgian territory. The withdrawal from Senaki was reported to be underway by 22 August 2008.
