= Demographics of Georgia (country) =

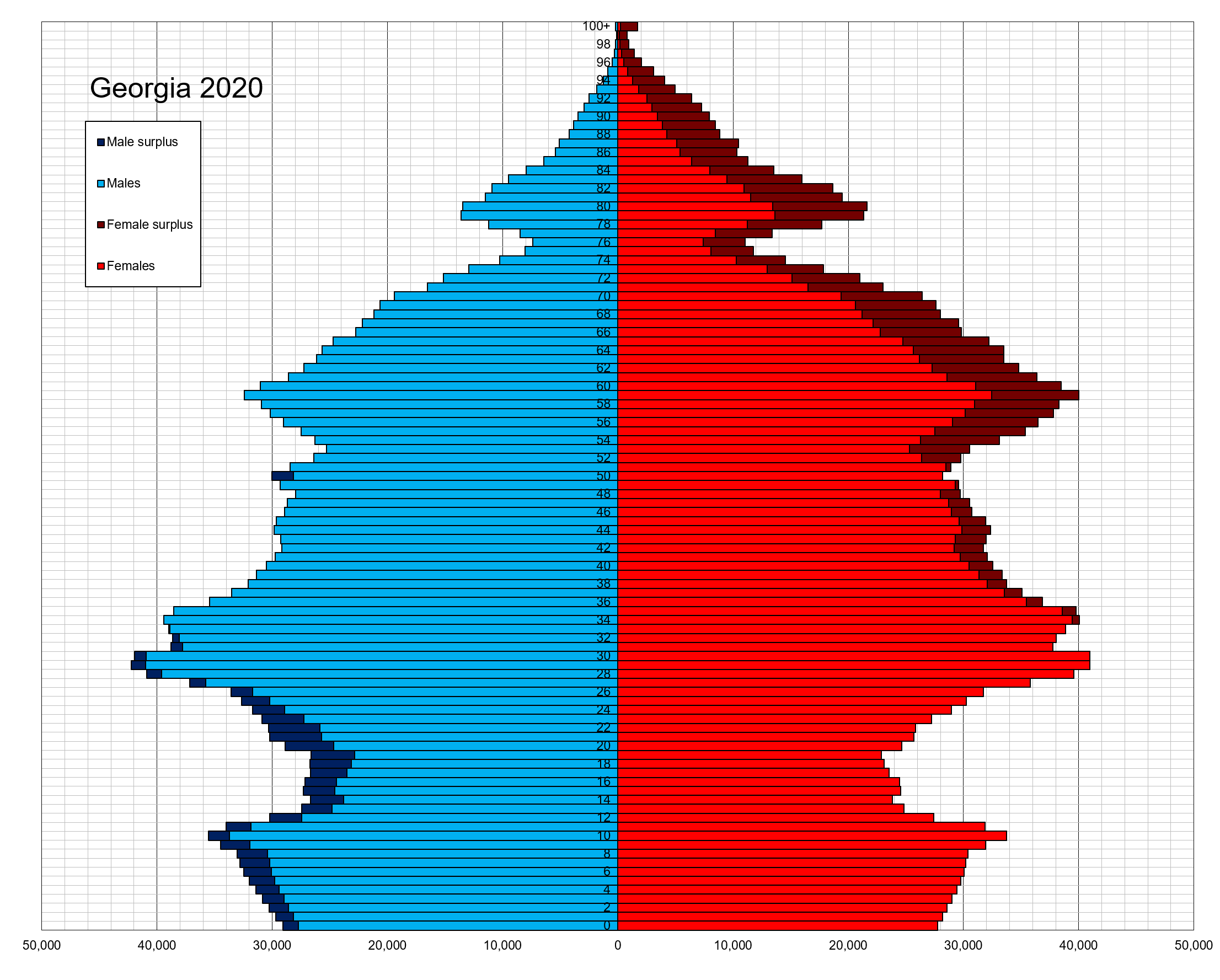
- Georgia population pyramid in 2020
- Population: 3,704,500 (1 January 2025)
- Density: 65.3 (2018)
- Growth rate: ▼1.5‰ (2017)
- Birth rate: 14.3‰ (2017)
- Death rate: 12.8‰ (2017)
- Life expectancy: 73.5 years (2018)
- Infant mortality: 8.1‰ (2018)
- Net migration rate: −0.6 (2017) (Note: Does not including data of the Russian occupied territories of Georgia)
- Immigrant share: 2.1% (2024)

Age structure
- 0–14 years: 19.2%
- 15–64 years: 64.2%
- 65 and over: 16.6%

Sex ratio
- Total: 0.92 male(s)/female
- At birth: 1.07 male(s)/female
- Under 15: 1.09 male(s)/female
- 15–64 years: 0.96 male(s)/female
- 65 and over: 0.6 male(s)/female

Nationality
- Nationality: noun: Georgian(s) adjective: Georgian
- Major ethnic: Georgians
- Minor ethnic: Ethnic minorities in Georgia

Language
- Official: Georgian (Abkhaz) (Note: Official only in Abkhazia.)
- Spoken: Others

Historical population

Year	Pop.	±% p.a.
1770	761,000	—
1800	784,700	+0.10%
1832	892,100	+0.40%
1865	1,289,200	+1.12%
1886	1,641,900	+1.16%
1897	1,919,400	+1.43%
1914	2,697,500	+2.02%
1917	2,357,800	−4.39%

Year	Pop.	±% p.a.
1921	2,677,000	+3.23%
1926	2,666,494	−0.08%
1939	3,540,023	+2.20%
1959	4,044,045	+0.67%
1970	4,686,358	+1.35%
1979	4,993,182	+0.71%
1989	5,400,841	+0.79%
2002	4,371,535	−1.61%

Note: Present territory of Georgia
* Corrected as per

Census population
Year	Pop.	±% p.a.
2002	4,371,535	—
2014	3,713,804	−1.35%
2024	3,929,581	+0.57%
Note: Territory under control of Georgia

The demographic features of the population of Georgia include population growth, population density, ethnicity, education level, health, economic status, religious affiliations, and other aspects of the population.

== Population size and structure ==
Density of the population of Georgia by municipality (2018)

Distribution of the population of Georgia by municipalities

Municipalities of Georgia by the population's predominant gender

Cities and towns in Georgia by population size

The demographic situation in Georgia, like that of some other former Soviet republics (especially Estonia and Latvia), has been characterized by two prominent features since independence: decline in total population and significant "Georgianization" of the ethnic composition. The proportion of ethnic Georgians increased by full 10 percentage points between 1989 and 2002, rising from 73.7% to 83.7% of the population. This occurred due to two migratory movements: Georgians living and working in other Soviet republics returned to their homeland, while other nationalities left Georgia.

While Georgia was part of the Soviet Union the population grew steadily, rising from less than 4 million in the 1950s to a peak of 5.5 million in 1992 (including Abkhazia and Tskhinvali Region). From 1992 the population began to decline sharply due to civil war and economic crisis driven mass migration throughout the 1990s and into the early 2000s. By 2013, the population has stabilized around 3.7 million (excluding Abkhazia and Tskhinvali Region). The 2002 population census in Georgia revealed a net migration loss of more than one million persons, or 20% of the population, since the early 1990s, confirmed by other studies. (Note: Page 14, Population Dynamics in Georgia (UNFPA)) Other factors of the population decline include net birth-death deficits in the period 1995–2010 (Note: Page 1–4, Population Dynamics in Georgia (UNFPA)) and the exclusion of Abkhazia and Tskhinvali Region from the statistics since 1994, which population was estimated in 2005 at 178,000 and 49,200, respectively. (Note: Page 3, footnote 4, Population Dynamics in Georgia (UNFPA))

Georgia was named among the highest-emigration countries in the world (relative to its population size) in a 2007 World Bank report. Russia received by far most migrants from Georgia. According to United Nations data this totalled to 625 thousand by 2000, which has declined to 450 thousand by 2019. Initially the out-migration was driven by non-Georgian ethnicities, but due to the war and crisis ridden 1990s, and the subsequent bad economic outlook, increasing numbers of Georgians emigrated as well. The 1989 census recorded 341,000 ethnic Russians, or 6.3 per cent of the population, which declined to 26,453 (0.7%) by 2014. The 2010 Russian census recorded about 158,000 ethnic Georgians living in Russia,

View source data.
View source data.

=== Data correction ===
The 2014 census, executed in collaboration with the United Nations Population Fund (UNFPA), found a population gap of approximately 700,000 compared to the 2014 data from the National Statistical Office of Georgia, Geostat, which was cumulatively built on the 2002 census. Consecutive research estimated the 2002 census to be inflated by 8 to 9 percent, which affected the annually updated population estimates in subsequent years. One explanation put forward by UNFPA is that families of emigrants continued to list them in 2002 as residents for fear of losing certain rights or benefits. Other factors that distorted the demographic data included a lack of quality in the registration system of migration, births, deaths and marriages. It was not until around 2010 that parts of the system became reliable again. With the support of the UNFPA, the demographic data of the period 1994–2014 has been retro-projected. The results of the project were presented and published in 2018. Based on this back-projection Geostat has corrected its data for these years, both in its annual publications starting from 2018, and its public access database.

=== Structure of the population ===
Structure of the population (01.01.2019) :

Age Group	Male	Female	Total	%
Total	1 790 600	1 929 600	3 720 200	100%
0–4	141 300	131 900	273 200	7.35%
5–9	134 600	124 300	258 900	6.96%
10–14	118 500	106 200	224 700	6.04%
15–19	109 100	96 500	205 600	5.53%
20–24	115 400	104 000	219 400	5.90%
25–29	129 700	126 100	255 800	6.88%
30–34	136 000	135 100	271 100	7.28%
35–39	126 500	127 600	254 100	6.83%
40–44	119 100	121 400	240 500	6.46%
45–49	115 100	119 100	234 200	6.30%
50–54	111 800	121 300	233 100	6.27%
55–59	120 800	139 800	260 600	7.00%
60–64	102 500	129 300	231 800	6.23%
65–69	80 800	112 800	193 600	5.20%
70–74	51 300	80 200	131 500	3.53%
75–79	36 100	64 800	100 900	2.71%
80–84	28 900	58 700	87 600	2.36%
85+	13 000	30 600	43 600	1.17%
Age group	Male	Female	Total	Percent
0–14	394 400	362 400	756 800	20.35%
15–64	1 186 000	1 220 200	2 406 200	64.68%
65+	210 100	347 100	557 200	14.97%

View source data.
Originally determined/estimated population since 1950.
Correction through retro-projection (1994–2017) by UN and Geostat

Note: 1993–1994 drop is exclusion of Abkhazia and Tskhinvali Region from population statistics.

View source data.
View source data.

== Vital statistics ==
Notable events in Georgian demographics:

- 1991-1993 Georgian Civil War

Sources: United Nations, Demoscope, (Note: Demoscope, 1950–1993 total population at beginning of year,) GeoStat

=== Births and deaths ===
==== Total area ====
	Population per 1 Jan.	Live births^{1}	Deaths^{1}	Natural change^{1}	Crude birth rate (per 1000)	Crude death rate (per 1000)	Natural change (per 1000)	Crude migration change (per 1000)	Fertility rates
1950	3,528,000	82,900	27,000	55,900	23.5	7.7	15.9		
1951	3,585,000	86,800	26,900	59,900	24.2	7.5	16.7	−0.5	
1952	3,646,000	85,700	26,600	59,100	23.5	7.3	16.2	0.8	
1953	3,710,000	87,200	26,300	60,900	23.5	7.1	16.4	1.2	
1954	3,775,000	91,400	26,000	65,400	24.2	6.9	17.3	0.2	
1955	3,839,000	92,500	25,700	66,800	24.1	6.7	17.4	−0.4	
1956	3,904,000	89,800	26,500	63,300	23.0	6.8	16.2	0.7	
1957	3,967,000	89,700	27,000	62,700	22.6	6.8	15.8	0.3	
1958	4,031,000	93,100	27,400	65,700	23.1	6.8	16.3	−0.2	
1959	4,044,000	98,300	27,400	70,900	24.0	6.7	17.3	−14.3	
1960	4,129,000	102,866	27,015	51,866	24.7	6.5	18.2	2.8	2.65
1961	4,190,000	104,429	27,621	53,429	24.7	6.5	18.2	−3.4	2.65
1962	4,258,000	101,717	30,394	51,717	23.7	7.1	16.6	−0.4	2.63
1963	4,325,000	100,326	29,620	51,326	23.0	6.8	16.2	−0.5	2.62
1964	4,389,000	97,433	29,708	48,433	22.0	6.7	15.3	−0.5	2.62
1965	4,450,000	94,987	31,291	46,987	21.2	7.0	14.2	−0.3	2.60
1966	4,505,000	92,026	30,389	44,026	20.3	6.7	13.6	−1.2	2.57
1967	4,556,000	89,302	32,904	42,302	19.5	7.2	12.3	−1.0	2.53
1968	4,598,000	89,660	32,416	43,660	19.4	7.0	12.4	−3.2	2.52
1969	4,640,000	87,069	35,169	41,069	18.7	7.5	11.2	−2.1	2.45
1970	4,674,000	90,207	34,283	45,207	19.2	7.3	11.9	−4.6	2.62
1971	4,729,000	90,396	35,325	45,396	19.0	7.4	11.6	0.2	2.61
1972	4,778,000	86,402	36,409	41,402	18.0	7.6	10.4	0	2.53
1973	4,818,000	88,577	35,911	44,577	18.3	7.4	10.9	−2.5	2.58
1974	4,856,000	89,761	37,145	45,761	18.4	7.6	10.8	−2.9	2.59
1975	4,895,000	89,712	39,292	45,712	18.3	8.0	10.3	−2.3	2.52
1976	4,920,000	90,605	38,875	46,605	18.3	7.9	10.4	−5.3	2.52
1977	4,960,000	89,028	40,139	45,028	17.9	8.1	9.8	−1.7	2.33
1978	4,986,000	88,766	40,239	45,766	17.8	8.1	9.8	−4.6	2.31
1979	4,993,000	89,803	41,907	47,896	17.8	8.4	9.5	−8.1	2.34
1980	5,029,000	89,458	43,346	46,112	17.6	8.6	9.1	−1.9	2.26
1981	5,071,000	92,501	43,961	48,540	18.1	8.6	9.5	−1.1	2.29
1982	5,100,000	91,784	42,734	49,050	17.9	8.4	9.6	−3.9	2.25
1983	5,134,000	92,660	43,301	49,359	18.0	8.4	9.6	−2.9	2.20
1984	5,167,000	95,841	45,787	50,054	18.5	8.8	9.7	−3.3	2.24
1985	5,230,000	97,739	46,153	51,586	18.7	8.8	9.9	2.3	2.27
1986	5,234,000	98,155	46,354	51,801	18.7	8.8	9.9	−9.1	2.26
1987	5,266,000	94,595	46,332	48,263	17.8	8.7	9.1	−3.0	2.19
1988	5,397,000	91,905	47,544	44,361	17.1	8.9	8.3	16.6	2.13
1989	5,401,000	91,138	47,077	44,061	16.8	8.7	8.1	−7.4	2.15
1990	5,424,000	92,815	50,721	43,895	17.1	9.3	8.1	−3.8	2.29
1991	5,453,000	89,091	52,416	36,675	16.3	9.6	6.7	−1.4	2.07
1992	5,467,000	72,631	55,076	17,555	13.4	10.2	3.2	−0.6	1.72
1993	5,346,000	55,594	56,270	−676	11.5	11.6	−0.1	−22.0	

^{1}Births and deaths until 1959 are estimates.

==== Excluding Abkhazia and South Ossetia ====
Total population from 1994: excluding Abkhazia and Tskhinvali Region. Corrected as per retro-projection and as published in public access database.

	Population per 1 Jan.	Live births	Deaths	Natural change	Crude birth rate (per 1000)	Crude death rate (per 1000)	Natural change (per 1000)	Crude migration rate (per 1000)	Fertility rates
1994	4,922,900	57,311	50,326	6,985	11.8	10.4	1.4	−80.5	1.53
1995	4,742,300	56,486	49,219	7,267	11.9	10.1	1.8	−38.5	1.57
1996	4,573,200	55,153	48,251	6,902	11.6	10.2	1.4	−37.1	1.60
1997	4,410,200	54,136	48,026	6,110	11.4	10.5	1.1	−36.7	1.63
1998	4,289,600	51,491	47,907	3,584	11.0	10.5	0.5	−27.8	1.60
1999	4,197,600	48,408	47,909	499	10.7	10.6	0.1	−21.5	1.55
2000	4,116,800	48,167	48,250	−83	10.7	10.7	−0.0	−19.2	1.59
2001	4,037,500	46,620	47,133	−513	10.5	10.6	−0.1	−19.2	1.57
2002	3,991,300	45,127	47,514	−2,387	10.2	10.8	−0.6	−10.8	1.53
2003	3,965,800	45,450	47,114	−1,664	10.3	10.7	−0.4	−6.0	1.56
2004	3,937,700	45,751	49,746	−3,995	10.3	11.2	−0.9	−6.2	1.58
2005	3,917,000	46,063	49,534	−3,471	10.4	11.1	−0.7	−4.6	1.59
2006	3,888,000	46,845	50,014	−3,169	10.6	11.2	−0.6	−6.8	1.62
2007	3,872,700	48,499	50,204	−1,705	11.1	11.4	−0.3	−3.6	1.69
2008	3,847,600	52,442	50,490	1,952	13.6	13.1	0.5	−7.0	1.84
2009	3,829,000	56,568	50,794	5,774	14.8	13.3	1.5	−6.3	2.01
2010	3,799,800	55,230	51,066	4,164	14.6	13.5	1.1	−8.7	2.00
2011	3,773,600	51,565	49,818	1,747	13.7	13.3	0.4	−7.3	1.89
2012	3,739,300	49,969	49,347	622	13.4	13.2	0.2	−9.3	1.85
2013	3,718,400	49,657	48,564	1,093	13.4	13.1	0.3	−5.9	1.86
2014	3,716,900	60,635	49,087	11,548	16.3	13.2	3.1	−3.5	2.31
2015	3,721,900	59,249	49,121	10,128	15.9	13.2	2.7	−1.4	2.31
2016	3,728,600	56,569	50,771	5,798	15.2	13.7	1.5	0.3	2.24
2017	3,721,900	53,293	47,822	5,471	14.3	12.9	1.4	−3.2	2.14
2018	3,729,600	51,138	46,524	4,614	13.7	12.5	1.2	0.9	2.12
2019	3,723,500	48,296	46,659	1,637	13.0	12.5	0.4	−2.0	2.01
2020	3,716,900	46,520	50,537	−4,017	12.5	13.6	−1.1	−0.7	1.97
2021	3,728,600	45,946	59,906	−13,960	12.3	16.1	−3.8	6.9	1.98
2022	3,688,647	42,319	49,118	−6,799	11.5	13.3	−1.8	−8.9	1.82
2023	3,736,400	40,214	42,756	−2,542	10.8	11.4	−0.6	13.5	1.70
2024	3,914,000	39,483	43,971	−4,488	10.1	11.2	−1.1	–10.0	1.67
2025	3,930,400	37,867	44,319	−6,452	9.6	11.3	–1.7	4.4	1.57
2026	3,941,100								

Source: Geostat public database, Geostat website, section Population and Demography. The 2024 Population Census results counted almost 200,000 more inhabitants than expected, thus the population figures for 2025 and 2026 were revised up.

==== Current vital statistics ====
Period	Live births	Deaths	Natural increase
January–June 2025	17,719	22,718	–4,999
January–June 2026	17,509	22,224	–4,715
Difference	▼ −210 (-1.18%)	▼ –494 (-2.17%)	▼ –284

=== Vital statistics by regions of Georgia in 2025 ===
Region	Births	Deaths	CBR	CDR
Georgia	37,867	44,319	9.6	11.3
Tbilisi	14,334	12,743	10.6	9.4
Abkhazia	–	–	–	–
Adjara	4,551	3,543	11.1	8.7
Guria	807	1,567	7.9	15.4
Imereti	4,275	7,197	8.5	14.4
Kakheti	2,610	4,014	8.7	13.3
Mtskheta-Mtianeti	743	1,227	7.9	13.1
Racha-Lechkhumi and Kvemo Svaneti	191	585	6.4	19.7
Samegrelo-Zemo Svaneti	2,178	4,378	7.2	14.5
Samtskhe-Javakheti	1,509	1,667	9.7	10.7
Kvemo Kartli	4,431	4,375	10.1	9.9
Shida Kartli	2,238	3,023	9.0	12.1

=== Fertility rate ===
Years	1900	1901	1902	1903	1904	1905	1906	1907	1908	1909
Total Fertility Rate	7.8	7.72	7.65	7.57	7.49	7.42	7.34	7.26	7.19	7.11

Years	1910	1911	1912	1913	1914	1915	1916	1917	1918	1919
Total Fertility Rate	7.03	6.96	6.88	6.8	6.73	6.65	6.57	6.5	6.42	6.34

Years	1920	1921	1922	1923	1924	1925	1926	1927	1928	1929
Total Fertility Rate in Georgia	6.27	6.19	6.11	6.04	5.96	5.88	5.81	5.73	5.65	5.58

Years	1930	1931	1932	1933	1934	1935	1936	1937	1938	1939
Total Fertility Rate in Georgia	5.5	5.32	5.13	4.95	4.77	4.59	4.4	4.22	4.04	3.85

Years	1940	1941	1942	1943	1944	1945	1946	1947	1948	1949
Total Fertility Rate in Georgia	3.67	3.61	3.56	3.5	3.44	3.39	3.33	3.27	3.21	3.16

=== Life expectancy ===
Life expectancy in Georgia since 1950

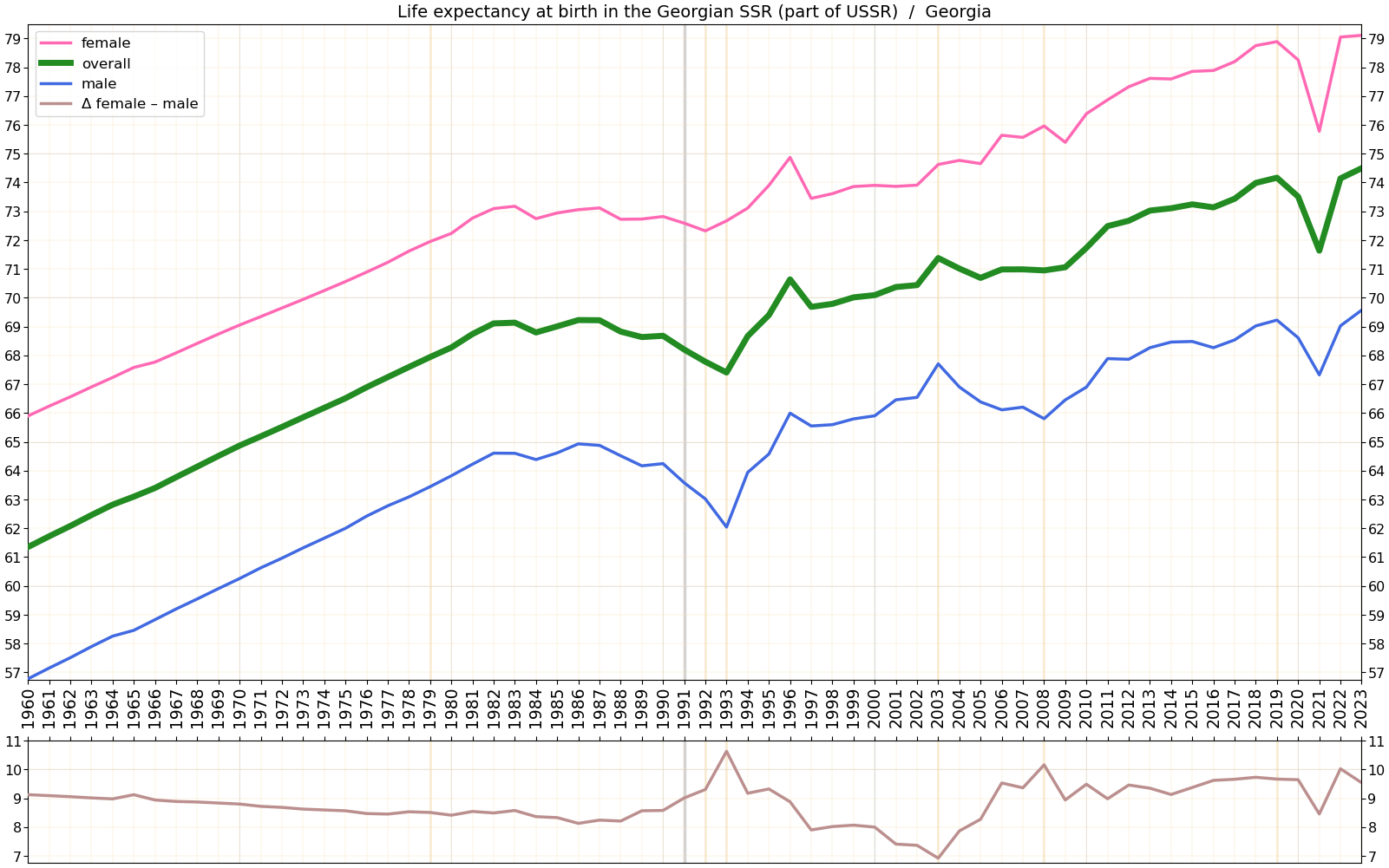
Life expectancy in Georgia since 1960 by gender

Period	Life expectancy in Years
1950–1955	60.65
1955–1960	▲62.65
1960–1965	▲64.65
1965–1970	▲66.65
1970–1975	▲68.15
1975–1980	▲69.64
1980–1985	▼69.63
1985–1990	▲70.45
1990–1995	▼70.11
1995–2000	▲71.09
2000–2005	▲72.60
2005–2010	▲72.65
2010–2015	▲72.74
2015–2020	▲73.52
2020–2025	▲74.24

==== by regions ====
region	2019				2019 →2021	2021	2021 →2022	2022				2019 →2022
region	overall	male	female	F Δ M	2019 →2021	overall	2021 →2022	overall	male	female	F Δ M	2019 →2022
Georgia on average	73.47	68.49	78.43	9.94	−1.78	71.69	−0.10	71.59	66.76	76.46	9.70	−1.88
Shida Kartli	74.62	69.53	79.83	10.30	−1.80	72.82	−0.11	72.71	67.77	77.82	10.05	−1.91
Kvemo Kartli	74.33	69.27	79.47	10.20	−1.80	72.53	−0.11	72.42	67.52	77.48	9.96	−1.91
Imereti, Racha-Lechkhumi and Kvemo Svaneti	74.28	69.22	79.41	10.19	−1.80	72.48	−0.11	72.37	67.47	77.42	9.95	−1.91
Samtskhe–Javakheti	74.12	69.08	79.22	10.14	−1.79	72.33	−0.11	72.22	67.33	77.23	9.90	−1.90
Adjara	72.78	67.86	77.59	9.73	−1.76	71.02	−0.11	70.91	66.15	75.64	9.49	−1.87
Guria	72.52	67.63	77.27	9.64	−1.75	70.77	−0.11	70.66	65.92	75.33	9.41	−1.86
Samegrelo-Zemo Svaneti	72.46	67.57	77.20	9.63	−1.75	70.71	−0.11	70.60	65.86	75.26	9.40	−1.86
Tbilisi	71.78	66.46	77.24	10.78	−1.73	70.05	−0.11	69.94	64.78	75.30	10.52	−1.84
Kakheti	71.10	66.33	75.54	9.21	−1.71	69.39	−0.11	69.28	64.66	73.65	8.99	−1.82
Mtskheta-Mtianeti	65.53	60.64	69.52	8.88	−1.58	63.95	−0.10	63.85	59.11	67.77	8.66	−1.68

Data source: Global Data Lab

View source data.

== Ethnic groups ==
Population of Georgia in 2014
1. Georgians (86.8%)
2. Azerbaijanis (6.30%)
3. Armenians (4.50%)
4. Russians (0.70%)
5. Ossetians (0.40%)
6. Yazidis (0.30%)
7. Ukrainians (0.20%)
8. Greeks (0.20%)
9. Turks (0.10%)
10. Others (0.50%)

Percentage of ethnic Georgians by municipality

Ethnic composition of the regions of Georgia

Georgians are the predominant ethnic group in Georgia, according to the 2014 census 86.83% of the population. The proportion in 2014 was much higher than in preceding censuses as in 2014 Abkhazia and Tskhinvali Region were not under government control and therefore not included. As a result of this the proportion of Ossetians and Abkhazians was very low (0.39% and 0.02%, respectively).

Population of Georgia according to ethnic group (1800–1897)
	census 1800		census 1832		census 1865		census 1886		census 1897	
	Number	%	Number	%	Number	%	Number	%	Number	%
Georgians	622,600	79.4	677,100	75.9	950,600	73.8	1,188,100	72.4	1,331,300	69.4
Armenians	47,000	6.0	84,000	9.4	122,600	9.5	172,900	10.5	197,000	10.3
Russians					25,900	2.0	42,500	2.6	101,000	5.3
Ossetians	29,300	3.7	32,300	3.6	45,500	3.6	71,000	4.3	81,500	4.2
Transcaucasian Tatars*	30,000	3.8	27,000	3.0	51,500	4.0	62,600	3.8	81,100	4.2
Abkhazians	52,000	6.6	56,600	6.3	60,000	4.6	38,000	2.3	42,600	2.2
Greeks	500	0.1	7,000	0.8	12,000	0.9	28,800	1.8	38,500	2.0
Jews	3,300	0.4	4,000	0.5	7,800	0.6	11,700	0.7	17,200	0.9
Germans			4,100	0.5	4,200	0.3	5,500	0.3	7,400	0.4
Others			4,100	0.5	9,100	0.7	20,800	1.3	21,800	1.1
Total	784,700	100	892,100	100	1,289,200	100	1,641,900	100	1,919,400	100
*: Azerbaijanis and Meshketian Turks living in Transcaucasia were called Caucasian Tatars in Soviet Census until 1939. Sources:

Population of Georgia according to ethnic group 1926–2024
Ethnic group	census 1926^{1}		census 1939^{2}		census 1959^{3}		census 1970^{4}		census 1979^{5}		census 1989^{6}		census 2002^{6}		census 2014^{7}		census 2024^{8}	
Ethnic group	Number	%	Number	%	Number	%	Number	%	Number	%	Number	%	Number	%	Number	%	Number	%
Georgians	1,788,186	66.8	2,173,922	61.4	2,600,588	64.3	3,130,741	66.8	3,433,011	68.8	3,787,393	70.1	3,661,173	83.8	3,224,564	86.8	3,304,075	84.1
Azerbaijanis	137,921	5.2	188,058	5.3	153,600	3.8	217,758	4.6	255,678	5.1	307,556	5.7	284,761	6.5	233,024	6.3	268,832	6.8
Armenians	307,018	11.5	415,013	11.7	442,916	11.0	452,309	9.7	448,000	9.0	437,211	8.1	248,929	5.7	168,102	4.5	169,296	4.3
Russians	96,085	3.6	308,684	8.7	407,886	10.1	396,694	8.5	371,608	7.4	341,172	6.3	67,671	1.5	26,453	0.7	42,545	1.1
Ukrainians	14,356	0.5	45,595	1.3	52,236	1.3	49,622	1.1	45,036	0.9	52,443	1.0	7,039	0.2	6,034	0.2	14,443	0.4
Ossetians	113,298	4.2	147,677	4.2	141,178	3.5	150,185	3.2	160,497	3.2	164,055	3.0	38,028	0.9	14,385	0.4	12,611	0.3
Yazidis	2,262	0.1	12,915	0.4	16,212	0.4	20,690	0.4	25,688	0.5	33,331	0.6	18,329	0.4	12,174	0.3	11,324	0.3
Kurds	7,955	0.3	12,915	0.4	16,212	0.4	20,690	0.4	25,688	0.5	33,331	0.6	2,514	0.1	1,596	0.0		
Greeks	54,051	2.0	84,636	2.4	72,938	1.8	89,246	1.9	95,105	1.9	100,324	1.9	15,166	0.3	5,544	0.2		
Assyrians	2,904	0.1	4,707	0.1	5,005	0.1	5,617	0.1	5,286	0.1	6,206	0.1	3,299	0.1	2,377	0.1		
Jews	30,389	1.1	42,300	1.2	51,582	1.3	55,382	1.2	28,298	0.6	24,795	0.5	2,333	0.0	1,405	0.0		
Abkhazians	56,847	2.1	57,805	1.6	62,878	1.5	79,449	1.7	85,285	1.7	95,853	1.8	3,527	0.1	864	0.0	907	0.0
Others	65,961	2.5	58,711	1.7	37,026	0.9	38,665	0.8	39,690	0.8	50,502	0.9	18,766	0.4	17,282	0.5	116,872	3.0
Total	2,677,233		3,540,023		4,044,045		4,686,358		4,993,182		5,400,841		4,371,535		3,713,804		3,929,581	
^{1} Source: . ^{2} Source: . ^{3} Source: . ^{4} Source: . ^{5} Source: . ^{6} Source: . ^{7} Source: . ^{8} Source:

== Migration ==
Georgia net migration, 1994–2011
Year	Net Migration
1994	−194,634
1995	−176,326
1996	−169,889
1997	−126,695
1998	−95,611
1999	−81,302
2000	−79,235
2001	−45,686
2002	−23,130
2003	−26,376
2004	−16,758
2005	−25,518
2006	−12,086
2007	−23,418
2008	−20,542
2009	−34,948
2010	−30,438
2011	−35,982

Georgia Net migration, 2012–present
Year	Immigration	Emigration	Net Migration
2012	69,063	90,584	−21,521
2013	92,458	95,064	−2,606
2014	82,161	88,704	−6,543
2015	92,557	95,965	−3,408
2016	90,228	98,288	−8,060
2017	83,389	85,451	−2,062
2018	88,152	98,935	−10,783
2019	96,864	105,107	−8,243
2020	89,996	74,264	15,732
2021	74,008	99,974	−25,966
2022	179,778	125,269	54,509
2023	205,875	245,064	−39,189
2024	135,811	121,425	14,386
2025	131,501	114,374	17,127

== Languages ==
The most widespread language group is the Kartvelian family, which includes Georgian, Svan, Mingrelian and Laz. The official languages of Georgia are Georgian, with Abkhaz having official status within the autonomous region of Abkhazia. Georgian is the primary language of 85.1 percent of the population, followed by 6.8 percent speaking Azerbaijani, 3.5 percent Armenian, 1.4 percent Russian, and 3 percent other languages.

Languages of Georgia in 2024
1. Georgian (85.1%)
2. Azerbaijani (6.76%)
3. Armenian (3.55%)
4. Russian (1.39%)
5. Ossetian (0.10%)
6. Other (3.11%)

Population of Georgia by native language
Language	2002 census		2014 census		2024 census	
Language	#	%	#	%	#	%
Georgian	3,677,995	84.14%	3,254,852	87.64%	3,343,987	85.10%
Azerbaijani	283,632	6.49%	231,436	6.23%	265,534	6.76%
Armenian	235,653	5.39%	144,812	3.90%	139,438	3.55%
Russian	83,007	1.90%	45,920	1.24%	54,460	1.39%
Ossetian	31,381	0.72%	5,698	0.15%	3,839	0.10%
Other	59,867	1.36%	31,014	0.84%	122,323	3.11%
Not stated	—N/a	—N/a	72	0.00%	—N/a	—N/a
Total	4,371,535		3,713,804		3,929,581	

== Religion ==
Religion (2014 Georgian census)
1. Georgian Orthodox Church (83.4%)
2. Armenian Apostolic Church (2.94%)
3. Catholic Church (0.52%)
4. Jehovah's Witnesses (0.33%)
5. Protestantism (0.07%)
6. Islam (10.7%)
7. Yazidism (0.23%)
8. Judaism (0.04%)
9. Other, irreligious or unspecified (1.73%)

Religion	2002		2014		2024	
Religion	#	%	#	%	#	%
Christianity	3,872,099	88.58%	3,240,724	87.27%	3,355,322	85.39%
–Georgian Orthodox Church	3,679,233	83.87%	3,097,573	83.41%	3,223,206	82.02%
–Armenian Apostolic Church	171,139	3.92%	109,041	2.94%	101,736	2.59%
–Catholic Church	34,727	0.79%	19,195	0.52%	19,593	0.50%
–Jehovah's Witnesses	—N/a	—N/a	12,395	0.33%	10,787	0.27%
–Protestantism	—N/a	—N/a	2,520	0.07%	—N/a	—N/a
Islam	433,784	9.92%	398,677	10.73%	437,458	11.13%
Yazidism	—N/a	—N/a	8,591	0.23%	—N/a	—N/a
Judaism	3,541	0.08%	1,417	0.04%	1,013	0.03%
Other religions	62,111	1.42%	1,429	0.04%	10,493	0.27%
No religion	—N/a	—N/a	19,080	0.51%	19,214	0.49%
Refusal	—N/a	—N/a	9,635	0.26%	8,912	0.23%
Religion not stated	—N/a	—N/a	34,251	0.92%	97,169	2.47%
Total	4,371,535	100.0%	3,713,804	100.0%	3,929,581	100.0%

== See also ==
- Georgia
- Armenians in Georgia
- Azerbaijanis in Georgia
- Russians in Georgia
- Greeks in Georgia
- Caucasus Greeks
- Poles in Georgia
- Assyrians in Georgia
