= Honorary Architect of Georgia =

Architecture award in Georgia

Honorary Architect of Georgia is an award issued annually to the most distinguished architects in Georgia. The award is mentioned in the Constitution of Georgia, in the chapter On Engineering Matters (IV-11), while the administration of the selective procedures and awarding ceremonies is undertaken by the Ministry of Economic Development of Georgia.

== 2008 ==
- Professor Giuli Gegelia
- Guram Abuladze

== 2009 ==
- Givi Beridze
- Davit Abuladze
- Duglas Zamtaradze
- Vitali Frangishvili
