= Occupation of Poti =

Aspect of the 2008 Russo-Georgian war

Coordinates: 42.1500°N 41.6667°E

- Part of Russo-Georgian War
Date	11 August – 13 September 2008 (1 month and 2 days)
Location	Poti, Georgia
Result	Russian victory

Belligerents
Russia	Georgia

Casualties and losses
None	6 naval vessels sunk 5 Humvees captured 21 soldiers captured

The Occupation of Poti was a series of Russian strikes against the Georgian port of Poti during the Russo-Georgian War in August 2008. The city was later occupied by Russian troops, who remained for some time before eventually withdrawing.

== Background ==
Poti is the crucial seaport of Georgia on the Black Sea and serves as an essential entrance for Transcaucasia and the landlocked Central Asia.

== Occupation ==
Russian aircraft attacked the town of Poti on 8 August, causing a two-day shutdown of the seaport. The Russian air force bombed the port on 9 August. According to reports, cisterns and the construction factory of ships in Poti were attacked by 8-11 Russian planes. Russian planes then attacked the Senaki military base, where Georgian reservists were present and the hotel in Senaki. Azerbaijan stopped oil deliveries to Georgian ports.

On the evening of 9 August, the Georgian mayor of Poti reported that Russian warplanes were approaching Poti from the Sea at around 20:00, but the Georgian ships opened fire and Russian planes were unable to drop bombs on the town.

Russia positioned ships in the vicinity of Poti and other Georgian ports on 10 August 2008. Georgian officials reported that oil tanker and Ukrainian ship were not allowed to enter Poti due to Russian blockade. Deputy chief of the General Staff of Russia, Anatoliy Nogovitsyn and Russian deputy foreign minister Grigory Karasin denied that a naval blockade was taking place. EurasiaNet journalist witnessed that Georgian police was not allowing cars into Poti.

The next day, Georgian and Russian representatives said that Russian troops were in Poti. However, Russia claimed it had only sent a task force for surveying the area. Russian troops advanced into western Georgia on 11 August and occupied the towns of Zugdidi and Senaki. Russia now controlled the key highway connecting the west of Georgia with the eastern part of the country. Russian troops were also witnessed in the town of Supsa. It was reported that cluster bombs were used in Poti by Russia. Russian authorities said that "peacekeepers" were deployed to the Senaki military base, built in 2006 near Abkhazia, to prevent renewed Georgian offensive in South Ossetia. Later, Russian forces reportedly left the Senaki base.

On early 12 August, Russian president announced he would cease Russian military campaign. In an hour after this announcement, Poti was apparently bombed. Russian forces marched in Poti and took up positions around it. A bridge on the Poti-Batumi road was patrolled by Russian paratroopers and armored vehicles.

On 13 August, Al Jazeera correspondent in Poti reported "more and more Russian troops coming into the area all day" and the destruction of several Georgian boats.

On 14 August, witnesses in Poti reported that Russian tanks had arrived in the town at about 09:00 GMT and were marauding or destroying infrastructure. Some troops were reportedly part of the peacekeeping contingent. Deputy chief of the Russian General staff, Anatoliy Nogovitsyn, denied the Russian presence in Poti. The Georgian Interior Ministry said that Russia used Iskander short-range missiles to attack Poti and Gori. Georgian coast guard reported that Russian military reappeared in Poti to target guard's equipment, including radar. An Associated Press Television News team witnessed Russian forces looking for Georgian military hardware near Poti. Regarding Poti, Nogovitsyn only said that Russian troops were acting within their "area of responsibility." Russian military used the Tbilisi-Senaki-Leselidze road to transport the looted goods from Poti and Senaki bases towards Abkhazia through the Russian-occupied Georgian town of Zugdidi, from which most population had fled. Georgian refugees from the Kodori Valley in Abkhazia were arriving in Zugdidi. On 15 August, 16 seized Georgian boats were taken out of Poti.

By 18 August, Russian forces controlled the crossroad of Poti, Senaki and Khobi along with the major part of the region of Samegrelo and had violated every agreement with the Georgian authorities.

One day after Russia's declaration of the beginning of the withdrawal from Georgia, 70 Russian soldiers moved into the seaport on the morning of 19 August. Russian soldiers took twenty-one Georgian troops prisoner and grabbed five US Humvees in Poti, taking them to a Russian-occupied military base in Senaki. The Humvees were then taken to Abkhazia. Russian artillery had been positioned along key roads between Poti and Abkhazia. Although Russian military asserted that armed Georgian soldiers were driving the Humvees in Poti before being arrested at a Russian inspection station, Georgia stated that Georgian servicemen were protecting the port from plunder, and that American Humvees were being prepared to be sent back to the United States following a military training. The captured Georgians served in the coast guard of Georgia. According to Georgian officials, the ceasefire agreement allowed the Georgian servicemen to be present in Poti, where they had taken up deserted positions on late 18 August. Poti authorities arrived in Senaki to persuade the Russian military to let the captured servicemen go. The port was closed on 19 August. The Wall Street Journal said that Russian actions in Poti constituted an additional attack on Georgian economy. The WSJ noted that Russian takeover of the Georgian city of Gori had blockaded the major east-west route and therefore the logistics transportation into the Georgian ports. An Azerbaijani news source quoted a Poti port official as saying, "All workers were expelled from the port". The New York Times reported that seven civilians had died in Poti from Russian bombing about a week ago. The White House demanded the return of captured US vehicles from Russia.

On 20 August, a claim was made by an official from the Poti port that the Russian military had withdrawn after destroying a vessel and capturing military hardware.

By 21 August, Russian troops were occupying a third of Georgia's territory. Georgian Foreign Minister Eka Tkeshelashvili reported that Russian troops were reinforcing their positions in Poti.

By 23 August, Russia claimed that it had completed military withdrawal; however, two Russian stations remained near Poti. Russian military was pulling out from Zugdidi to Abkhazia. After looting the Senaki military base for more than a week, Russian troops finally withdrew from the base. Local inhabitants reported the stealing of home appliances and toilets by Russian soldiers. On 23 August, General Anatoly Nogovitsyn insisted that Russian patrols were allowed by the ceasefire agreement and conceded that although Poti was not included in the security zone, "but that does not mean we will sit behind a fence watching them riding around in Hummers." Georgian residents of Poti protested against Russian checkpoint. The Russian military occupation of the area of Poti made the West anxious.

On 24 August, with Russian troops still within the port of Poti, a US warship with humanitarian assistance docked in Batumi, 80 km (50 mi) south of Poti, and two more warships were expected to arrive. The destroyer USS McFaul did not fit into the port of Batumi. The BBC reported that "the arrival of US naval personnel is undoubtedly intended to send a signal to the Russians". Russian military was plundering and damaging properties during their presence in Poti, even ransacking toilets.

Although the US Embassy in Tbilisi had promised that a United States Coast Guard Cutter, the Dallas, would arrive in Russian-controlled Poti on 27 August, the Dallas instead brought 34 tons of humanitarian assistance to Batumi. Georgian military alleged that Russians could have planted mines in Poti. Russian authorities declared on 27 August that Russian troops had left Poti and were manning checkpoints outside Poti. Russian warships were present in the sea near Poti.

On 13 September, all posts near Poti were abandoned by 11:00 Moscow Time.

== Aftermath ==
The UNOSAT carried out the preliminary analysis of satellite pictures of Poti taken on 25 August 2008. Six sunk Georgian vessels were discovered, while no other damage was visible in the city.

General Anatoliy Nogovitsyn declared on 25 August 2008 that Russia would not return the "trophy" Hummers to the United States. Russian media reported that the Hummers had special communications systems and the satellite equipment. Russian military believed that the captured Hummers were a separate reconnaissance and information center with a command and control vehicle.

On 26 September 2008, one Russian officer said that a special unit of the marines of the Black Sea Fleet planted explosives on all Georgian military boats and ships in Poti on 12 August 2008.
