= Senaki =

Senaki სენაკი
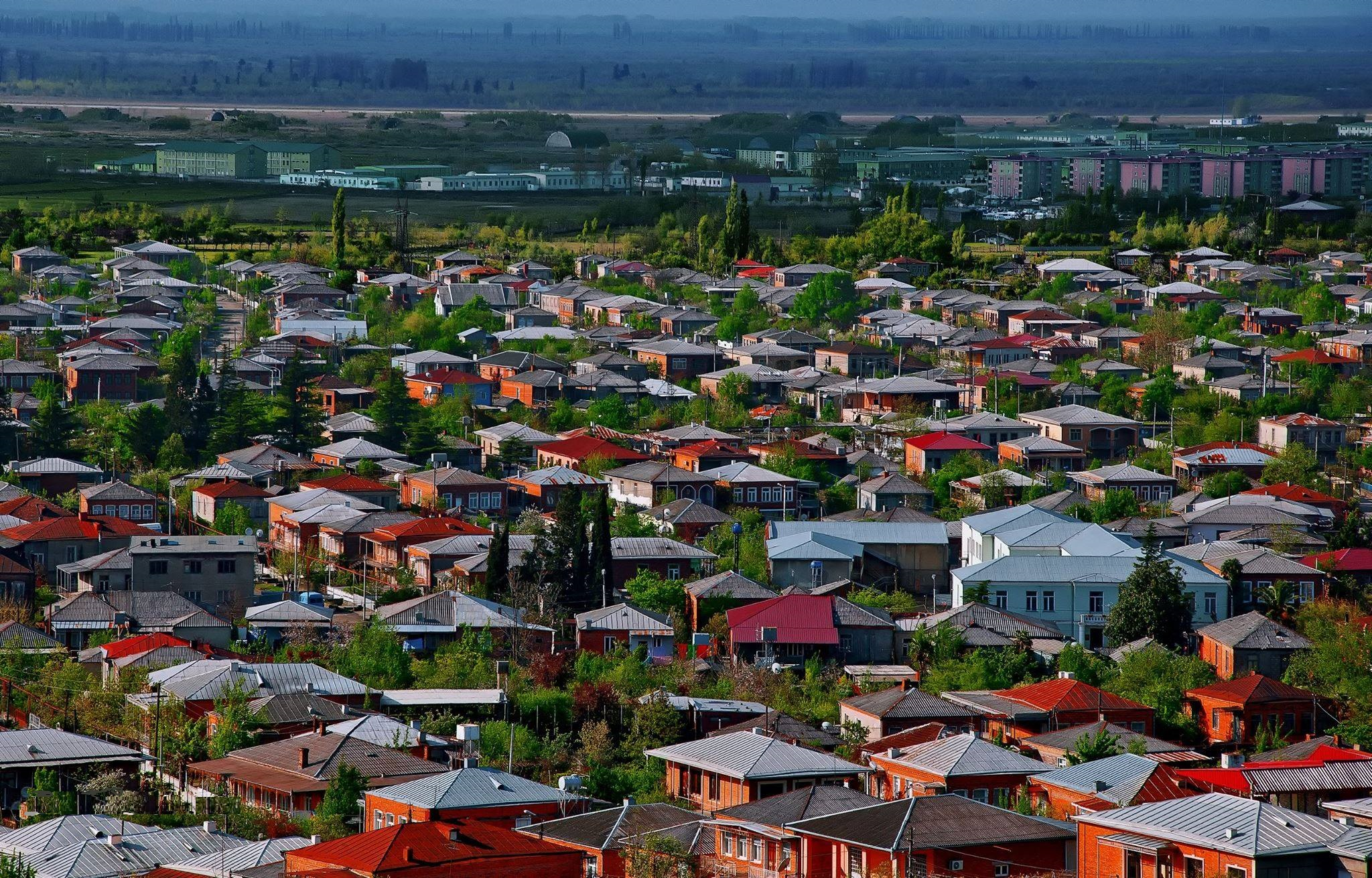
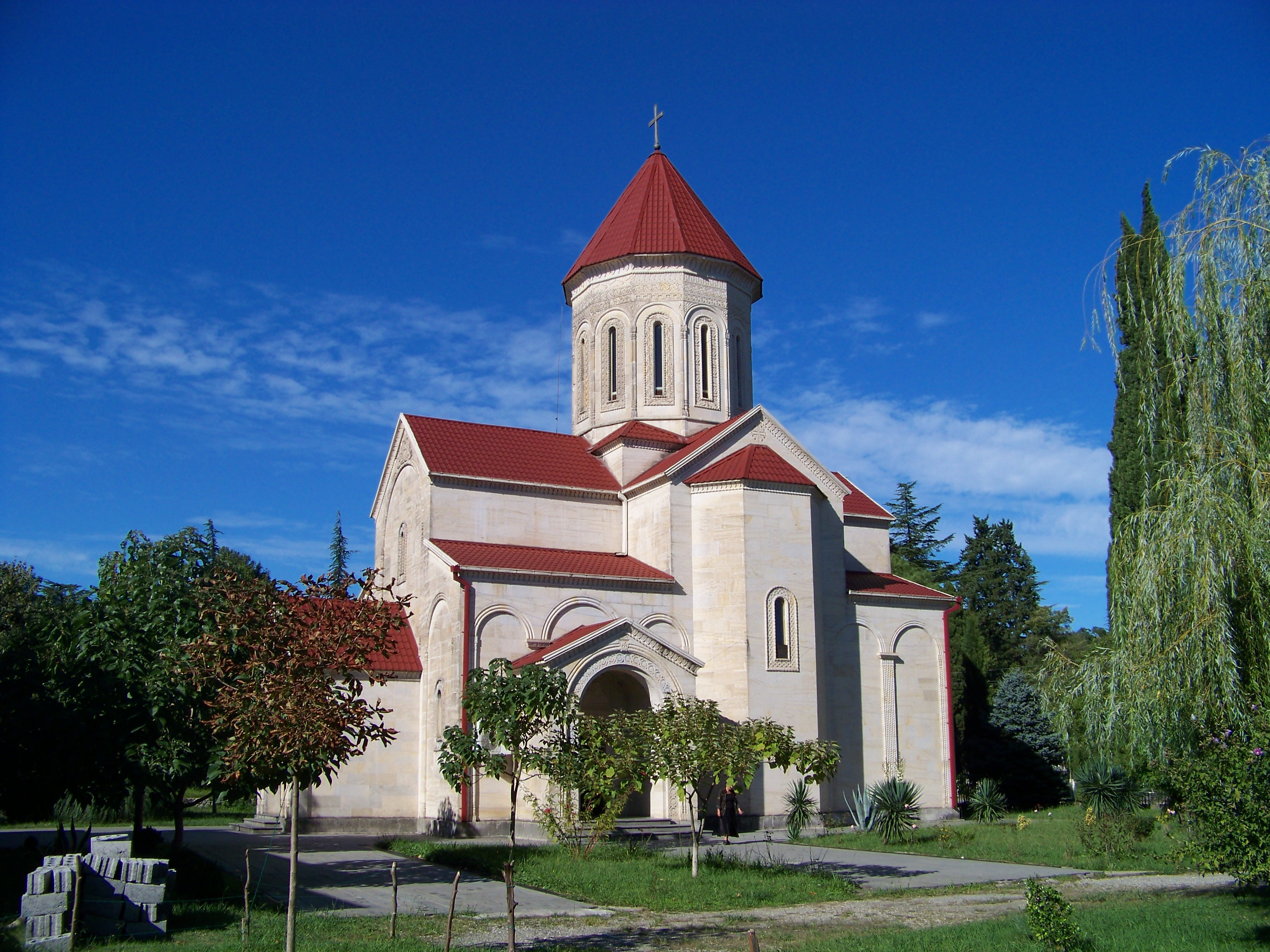

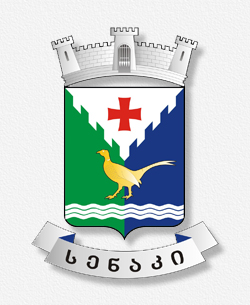
- Flag Seal

- Location of Senaki in Georgia Senaki (Samegrelo-Zemo Svaneti)
- Coordinates: 42°16′8″N 42°4′4″E
- Country: Georgia (country)
- Mkhare: Samegrelo-Zemo Svaneti
- District: Senaki
- Elevation: 28 m (92 ft)

Population (January 1, 2024)
  - Total: 15,652
- Time zone: UTC+4 (Georgian Time)

Senaki (Georgian: სენაკი, senak'i; Mingrelian: სანაკი, sanak'i) is a city in Samegrelo-Zemo Svaneti region, western Georgia. It is located at around 42°16′8″N 42°4′45″E between the rivers Tekhura/i and Tsivi, at an elevation of 28–38 meters above sea level. Senaki is the center of the Senaki Municipality and serves as a residence of Metropolitans of Senaki and Ckhorotskhu Eparchy of the Georgian Apostolic Autocephalous Orthodox Church.

== Etymology ==
According to Sulkhan-Saba Orbeliani the name "Senaki" (სენაკი) means "small room" or "chapel" in Georgian. From 1935 to 1976 the town was called "Mikha Tskhakaya" in honor of the Georgian Bolshevik revolutionary leader Mikhail Tskhakaya. In 1976 the name was simplified to "Tskhakaya". After 1989, the town was given back its original name.

== History ==
The geographical name "Senaki" first appears in the 17th century referring to the old trade settlement and cathedral on the right river bank of the river Tekhura/i. Historically, the city was the administrative center of Senaki Uyezd of the Kutaisi Governorate. After the beginning of the construction of the Poti-Tbilisi railway line (1872), the center was relocated to its current location, 5 km away from the old settlement. Senaki was one of the important centers of the mutiny against the Bolsheviks in 1924 as well as the center of the Georgia military mutiny of 1998. The city used to be an important military airbase during the Soviet period. The Second Infantry Brigade of the Georgian Army is now stationed on the same base. It was renewed after 2005 to meet NATO standards. The city was also the site of a battle during the Russo-Georgian war.

== Demography and population ==
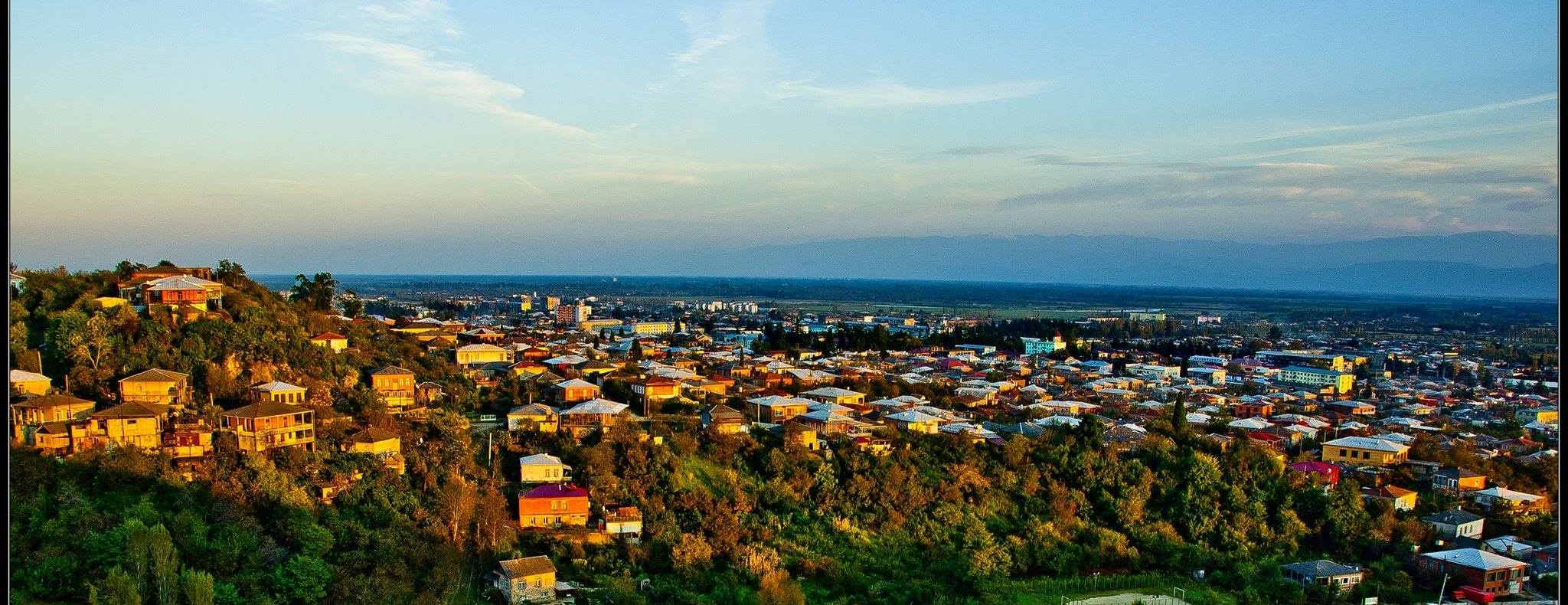
Senaki panorama

Historically Senaki is known as a distinctly mono-ethnic town with a majority of Georgians. According to the 2002 state census 98% of the total population were ethnic Georgians. The oldest official data about the population of Senaki stems from the 1897 census and counted 1248 people (927 – male, 321 – female). The 1950s-1970s were an important period for the development of Senaki which also affected the growth of the population. The 2014 census counted 21.596 people (including IDPs from Abkhazia). Today, besides Georgians (99,4%), Russians (0.19%), Armenians (0.18%), Assyrians (0.11%) and others (0.12%) are living in Senaki. During Soviet times a lot of Jews were living in the town. They mostly left city in the late 1970s.

== Economics ==
Senaki is an important station of the Tbilisi – Poti and Tbilisi – Zugdidi railway lines. It also connects several roads of international and national importance. Due to its location Senaki is one of the leading economic and trade centers of the Samegrelo-Zemo Svaneti region. During the Soviet period there used to be mechanical, carpet manufacturing and brick producing factories; The processing of wine, tea and citrus were developed there. The small and middle-sized industries functioning today in Senaki include several agro products (nut, laurel, tea, milk, corn) processing factories, wood and asphalt production. In June 2016, construction of a Euro 4 standard cement producing plant began close to the town. Cement produced in Senaki will target both local and export markets. At a three kilometer distance from Senaki the resort Menji can be found. During Soviet times it was a famous balneologycal and recreational water resort, which, nowadays, is severely damaged and abandoned.

== Culture and education ==
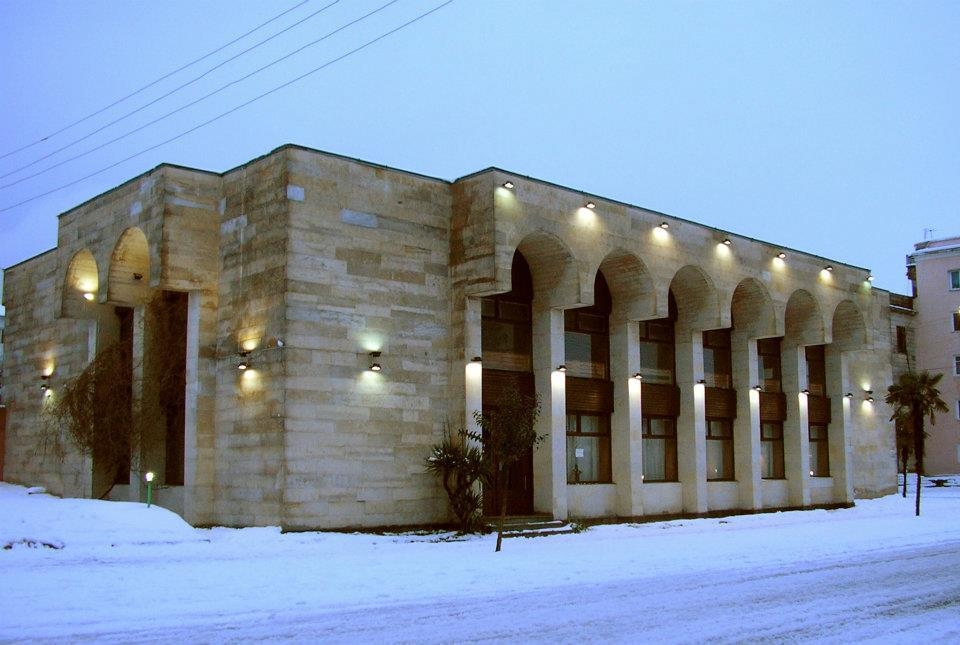
Senaki Art gallery

Historically Senaki was one of the important cultural and educational centers of the region. Two years after the establishment of the Georgian Theatre in 1879, the first performance was held in Senaki. One of the first nobiliary schools in Georgia was opened in Senaki (Currently Dzveli Senaki) in 1884. Famous Georgian writers, academics and public figures including Simon Janashia, Konstantine Gamsakhurdia, Arnold Chikobava, were taught in this school.

== Architecture and landmarks ==
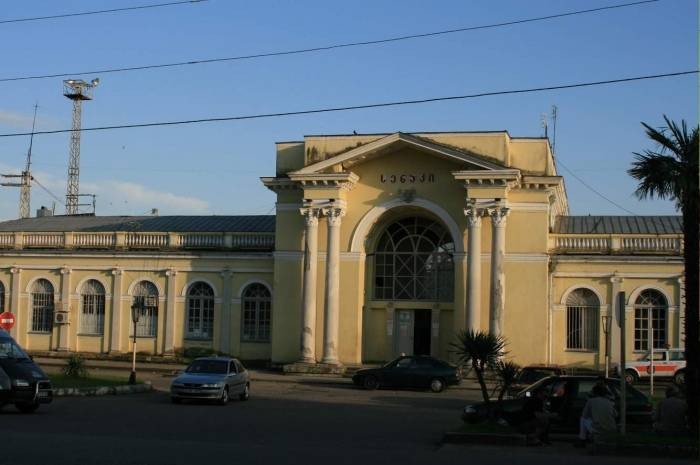
Senaki Train Station

One of the important landmarks of the town constitutes the State Theater in Baroque Revival style (architect Vakhtang Gogoladze). The theatre is part of the Georgian cultural heritage and is under rehabilitation until 2018. The town is also famous for its neat streets with red brick houses. At proximity to the town, on the so-called "Archangel hill", the historical church built by the monk Alex Shushania (named Senakeli) in 1908 can be found. The church was one of the few churches which were not closed during Soviet times in Georgia. North of the town different kinds of spiritual and historical sights are situated: the Teklati Convent, the Shkhefi fortress and the Sakalandarishvilo fortification. Close to Senaki the ancient archeological and historical site of Nokalakevi (Archeopolis, Tsikhe-Goji) can also be found. According to the different sources (e.x. F. Diobua de Monpereoux) the mythical Colchian town "Aia" and then capital of Lazica (Georgian: ეგრისის სამეფო) "Tsikhegoji" was located there.

== Annual events ==
=== Egrisoba ===
"Egrisoba" (Georgian: ეგრისობა) – The main annual event and public festival in Senaki. It is mostly celebrated in the middle of autumn. "Egirosoba" firstly was held in 1989 and then reestablished in 2014.

== Sports ==
- FC Egrisi Senaki
- FC Senakuri Senaki
- FC senakuri Egrisulo
- Futsal Club Kudji
- Rugby Club Jikha
- Horse-racing Marula

== Notable Citizens ==
- Valerian Gunia (1862–1938), Georgian dramatist, actor, director and critic.
- Arnold Chikobava (1898–1985), Georgian linguist and philologist
- Feofan Davitaia (1911-1979), Georgian geographer, climatologist and agrometeorologist.
- Giuli Gegelia (1942-), Georgian architect
- Vladislav Vetrov (1964-), Russian and Soviet (theater) actor, director, playwright

== Twin towns – sister cities ==
- Rakvere, Estonia
- Bila Tserkva, Ukraine
- (Georgia (country)) Gudauta, Abkhazia, Georgia

== See also ==
- Senaki Municipality
- Samegrelo-Zemo Svaneti
