= Gandzieli-Gegelia =

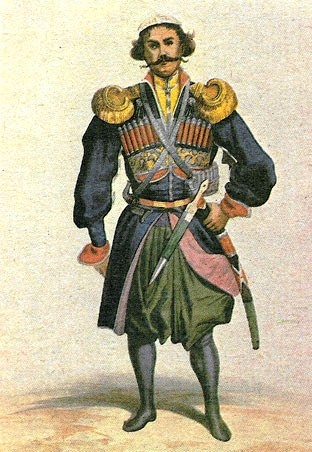
Mingrelian prince, by Grigory Gagarin. 1840s.

The Gandzieli family (literally meaning "of Gandza") was a noble family of Tavadi (Dukes) and later downgraded to the rank of Aznauri in the Kingdom of Georgia, in the period between 1083 and 1727.

== History ==
According to an extensive study of the surnames of Georgian nobility by Prince Vakhushti Bagrationi, Gandzieli's held the dukedom in Gandza, then Armenia currently part of Azerbaijan. Gandzielis lost their dominance over the Armenian duchy in 1727, as a consequence of the "lowering of the Kingdom of Armenia" and moved to Principality of Ksani, Georgia. However, due to the failure to sustain power in Gandza, the Georgian monarch Vakhtang VI lowered Gandzielis to the rank of Aznauri which was equal to that of Marquess at the time. In Ksani, Gandzielis assumed the title of the Royal Aznauri of Ksani, the highest of all the Aznauri degrees and led the court of the Principals of Ksani alongside other noble families. Gandzielis have been mentioned in the Treaty of Georgievsk as the Royal Aznauris of Ksani Principality alongside several other noble families. However, Gandzielis later moved to the Kingdom of Imereti where their surname changed to that of Gegelia. This occurred "due to the linguistic traditions" of the Imereti people as Bagrationi reported in his study. Eventually, one branch of the Gegelia family of Aznauris moved to the Kingdom of Odishi, the late Samegrelo, where they governed the marquisate of Martvili, Salkhino and Taleri until the Communist Red Army invasion of Georgia in 1921. Gegelias nowadays reside both in Imereti and Samegrelo regions of Georgia.

== List of nobility titles ==
- Dukes of Gandza (1038-1727)
- Royal Marquesses of Salkhino, Martvili and Taleri (1727–1921)

== Styles of reference ==
- His Ducal Serene Highness (1038-1727)
- His Nobleness (1727–1921)
