= Aleksander Szymkiewicz =

Polish architect (1858–1908)

- Born: November 12, 1858; Saint Petersburg, Russian Empire
- Died: 1908; Tbilisi, Russian Empire
- Occupation: Architect
- Buildings: Supreme Court of Georgia, Tbilisi State Conservatoire, Rustaveli Theatre

Aleksander Szymkiewicz (12 November 1858 – 1908) was a Polish architect who worked in Tbilisi in the 1880s–1890s. He was a member of the City Council and municipal architect of Tbilisi from 1885 to 1891.

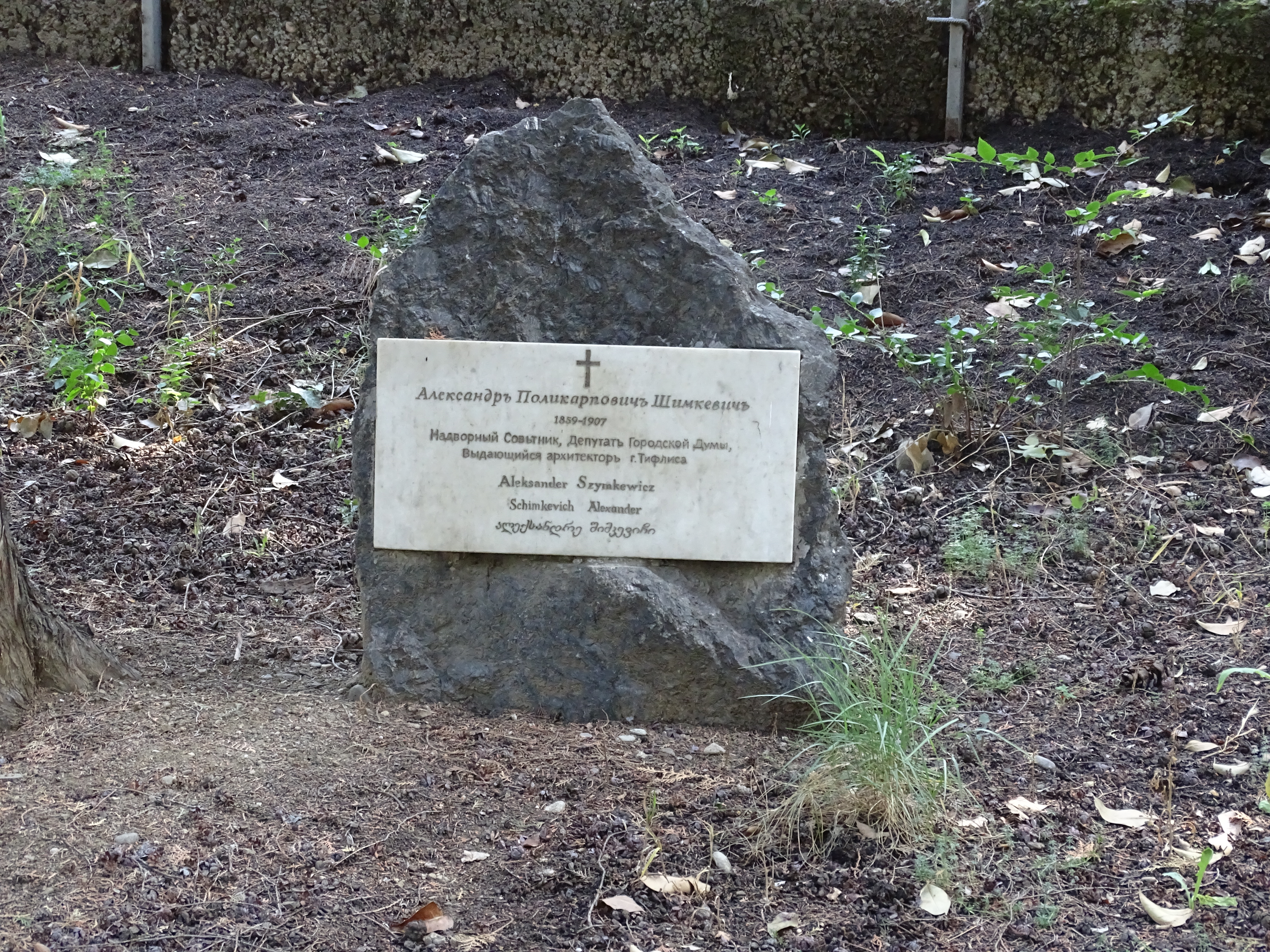
Szymkiewicz's grave (gravestone remains) at the Tbilisi new Lutheran church

== Biography ==
He was born in 1858 (according to other sources, in 1860) into a noble family. His father, a civil lawyer, came from the Kovno province. His mother, Emilia-Anna Maria Petrovna, née Gurskalin, was of Swedish-German origin, and her ancestors had lived in St. Petersburg since the 18th century. His maternal grandfather owned the Odeon publishing house. The family lived in Aue's house on the 11th line of Vasilyevsky Island. All three sons: Pavel (1856–1900), Alexander (1858–1907), and Peter (1862–1920) studied at the Karl May School, where teaching was conducted in German.

He graduated from the St. Petersburg Academy of Arts. During his studies, he received two medals: 2nd silver in 1880 and 1st silver in 1882. At the age of 25, he moved to Tbilisi, where he took the position of city architect. He held the rank of Court Counselor. From 1897 to 1901, he served as a deputy (vowel) in Tbilisi City Duma. He also taught at the Tbilisi Art School. He lived in his own house at 7 Chonkadze Street. In 1910, a scholarship named after Alexander Shimkevich was established for students of the Tbilisi Art School.

In Tbilisi, he designed among other projects, the building of the Supreme Court of Georgia, the Conservatoire building, the Caucasian Silk Station building (now the State Silk Museum), the Rustaveli Theatre (with Cornell K. Tatishchev), and various townhouses, including Andreoletti's house. He also designed the building of the Shota Rustaveli State University in Batumi and the Court of Appeals in Kutaisi. His designs combined baroque and classical elements.

== Gallery ==
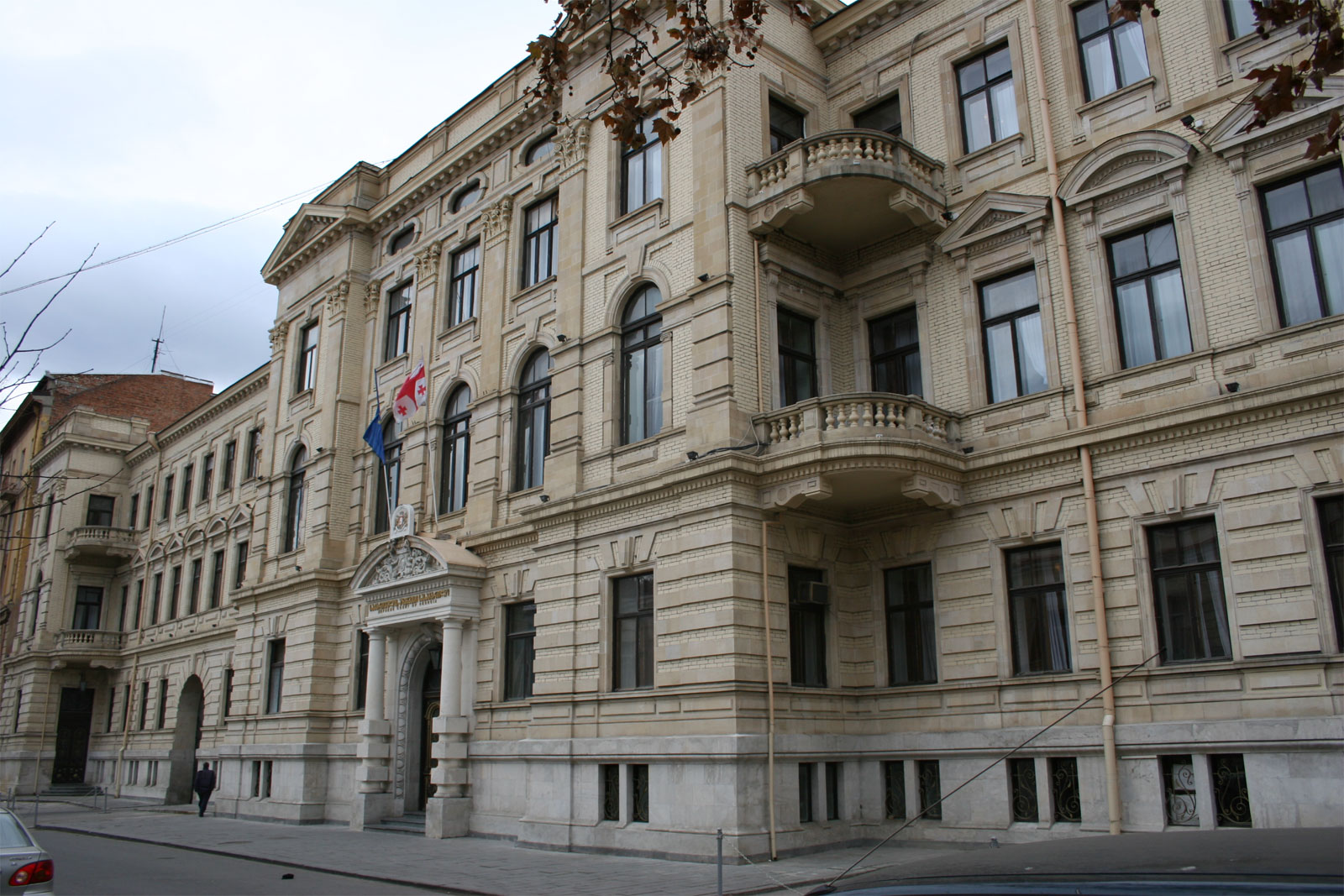
Supreme Court of Georgia in Tbilisi

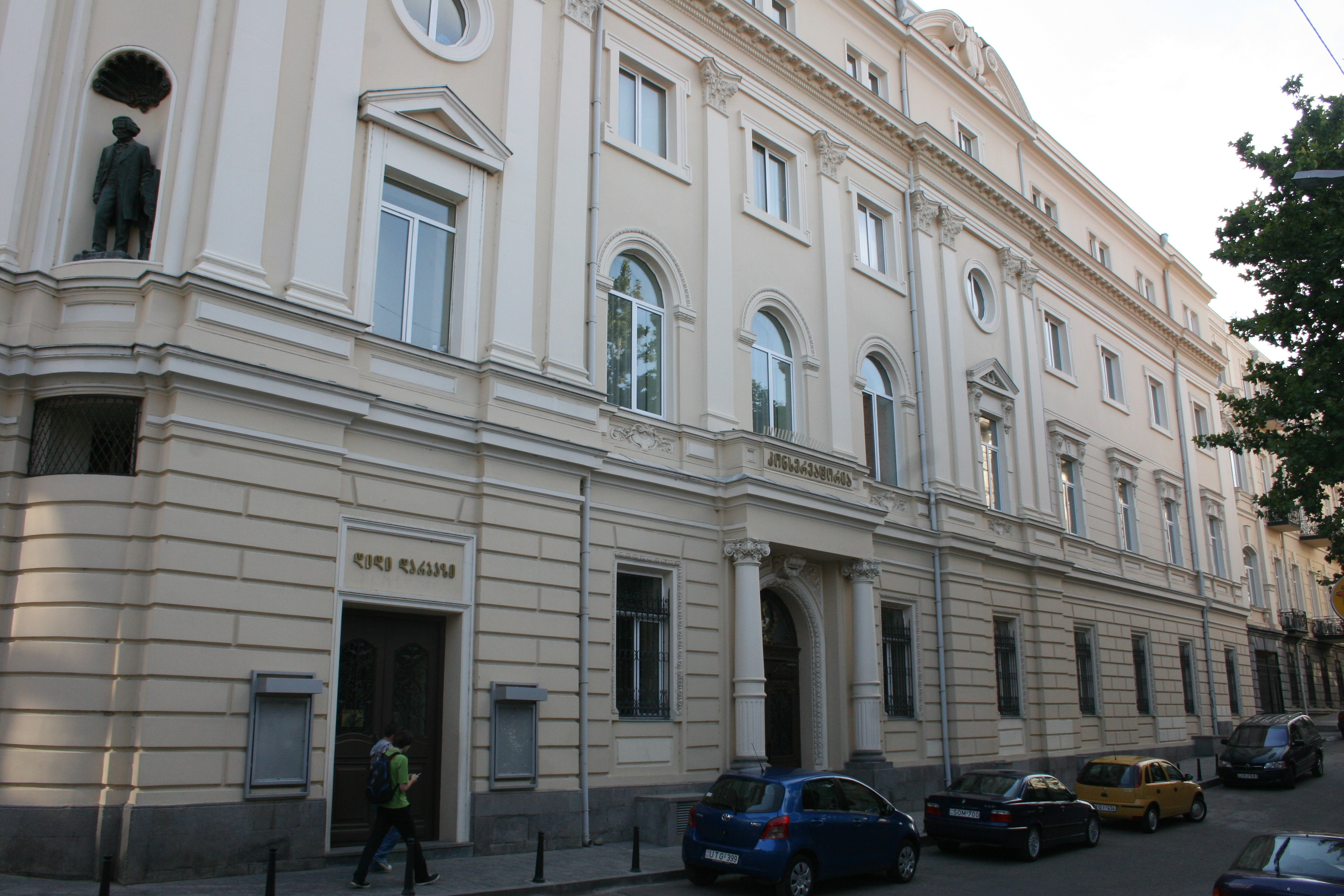
Tbilisi State Conservatoire

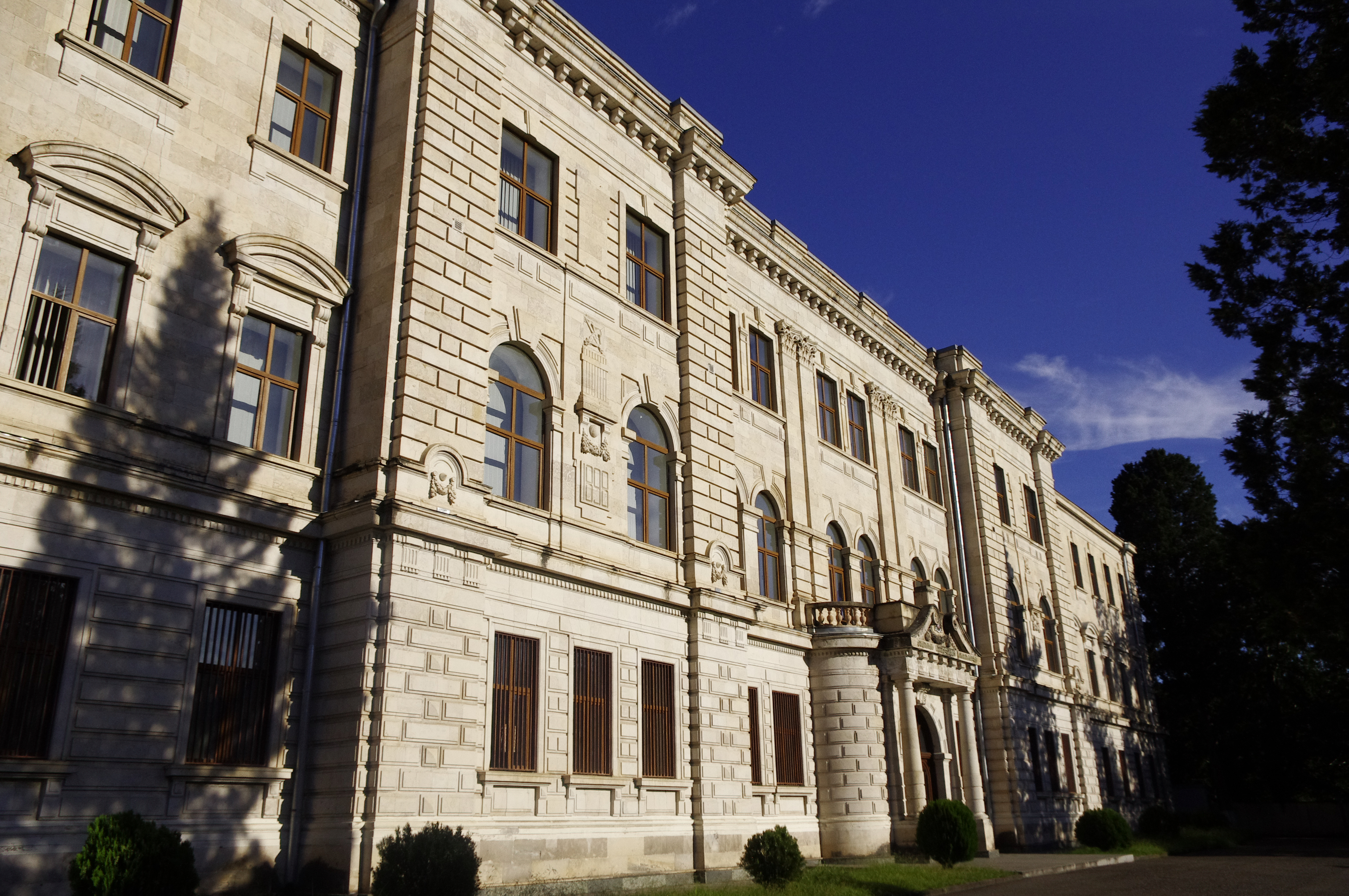
Court of Appeals in Kutaisi

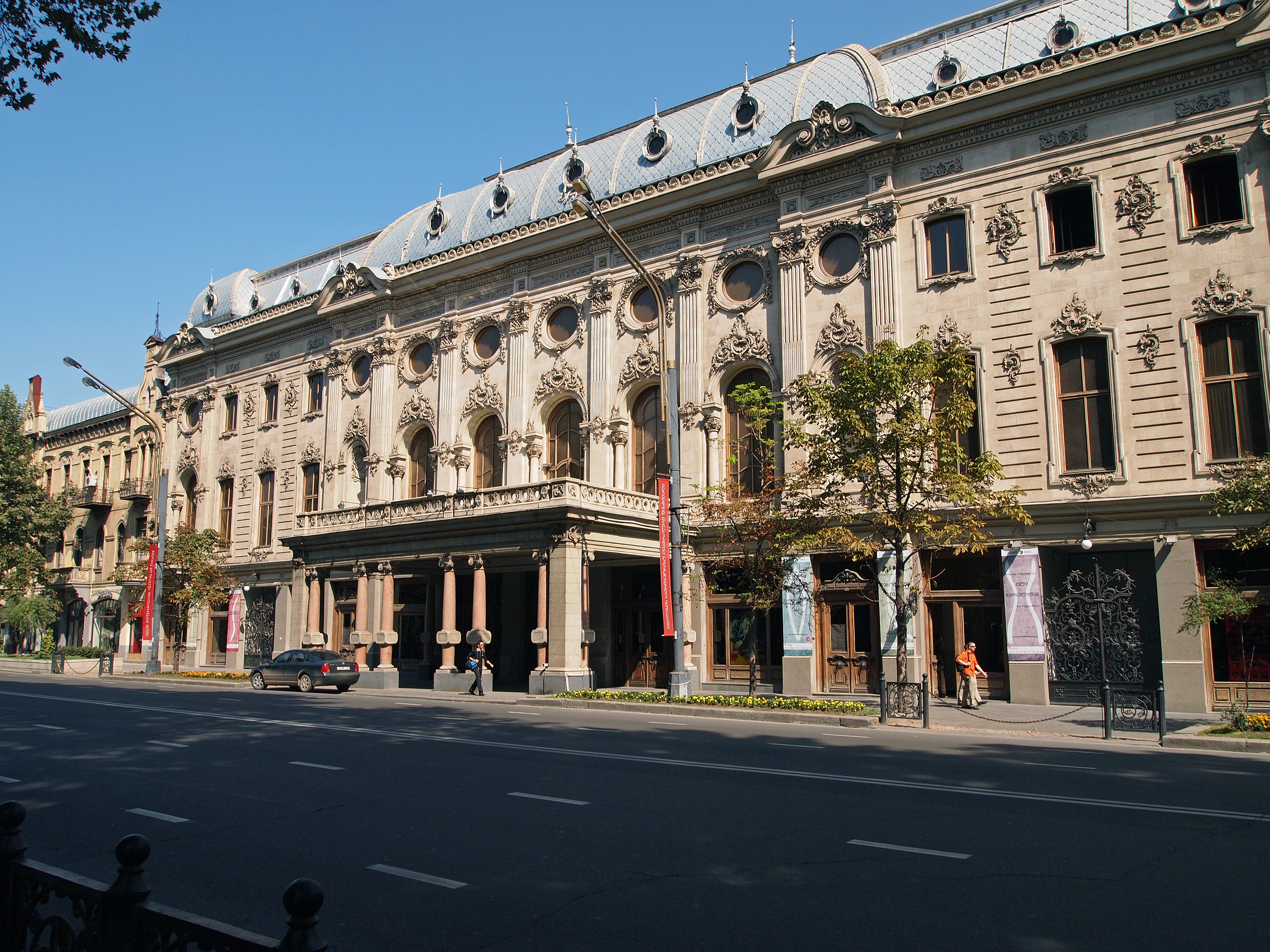
Rustaveli Theatre in Tbilisi
