= Rustaveli Theatre =

Theatre in Tbilisi, Georgia

Coordinates: 41°41′59″N 44°47′52″E

Tbilisi State Academic Theatre named after Shota Rustaveli
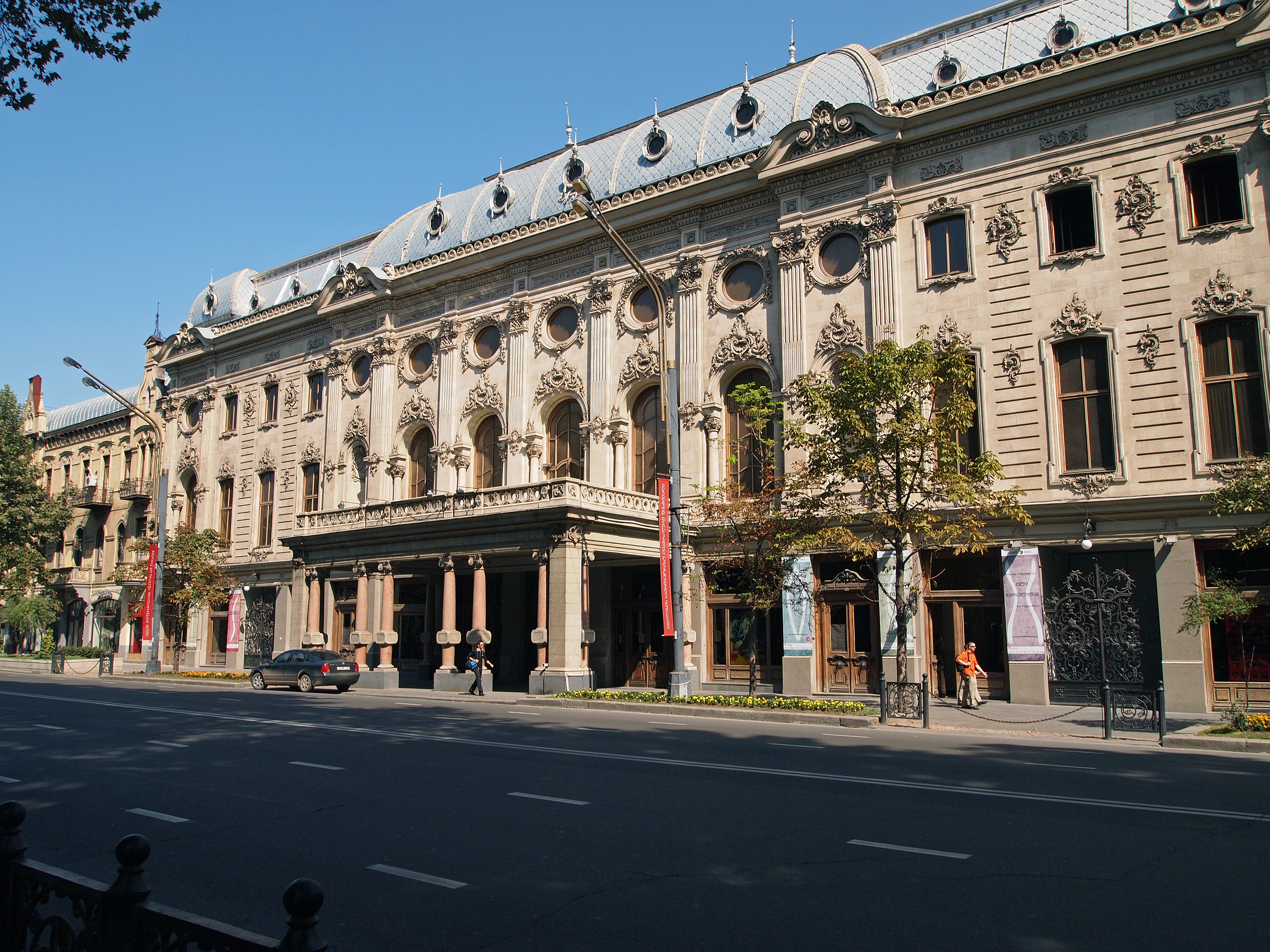
- Theater as seen in 2010
- Interactive map of the Tbilisi State Academic Theatre named after Shota Rustaveli area

General information
- Type: Performance venue
- Architectural style: Baroque, Rococo
- Location: Tbilisi, Georgia
- Completed: 1887
- Owner: Government of Georgia

Design and construction
- Architects: Cornell K. Tatishchev, Aleksander Szymkiewicz

Tbilisi State Academic Theater named after Shota Rustaveli (Georgian: თბილისის შოთა რუსთაველის სახელობის სახელმწიფო აკადემიური თეატრი, romanized: tbilisis shota rustavelis sakhelobis sakhelmts'ipo ak'ademiuri teat'ri), shortly Rustaveli Theater (Georgian: რუსთაველის თეატრი, romanized: rustavelis teat'ri), is the largest and one of the oldest theaters of Georgia, located in its capital Tbilisi on Rustaveli Avenue. Housed in an ornate Rococo-style edifice, the theatre was founded in 1887 and since 1921 has carried the name of Georgia's national poet Rustaveli.

== History and architecture ==
The building was founded in 1887 as an "Artists' Society". Upon request of the Artists' Society, several celebrated artists were commissioned to paint frescoes on the walls and ceilings of the basement. These artists included prominent Georgian painters Lado Gudiashvili and David Kakabadze, as well as theatre set designer Serge Sudeikin, who is known for his work for the Ballets Russes and the Metropolitan Opera. Two other important Georgian painters, Mose and Iracly Toidze, eventually joined the project as well. The masterpieces that once adorned the lower level of the Rustaveli Theatre were whitewashed during the period of Soviet rule and only a small portion of the frescoes has been restored.

In 1921 the building was renamed Rustaveli Theatre. Construction of the theatre was funded by Alexander Mantashev and it was designed by Cornell K. Tatishchev and Aleksander Szymkiewicz, Tbilisi's Municipal Architect.

From 2002 to 2005 the theatre underwent a thorough renovation, which was largely funded by Georgian businessman Bidzina Ivanishvili.

=== Performance facilities ===
The theatre is home to three stages including, the main stage (about 800 seats), the small stage (283 seats) and a Black Box Theatre (182 seats) for experimental performances. The theatre is also available for conferences and events and houses a large ballroom, a small ballroom and a small foyer.

== Photo gallery ==
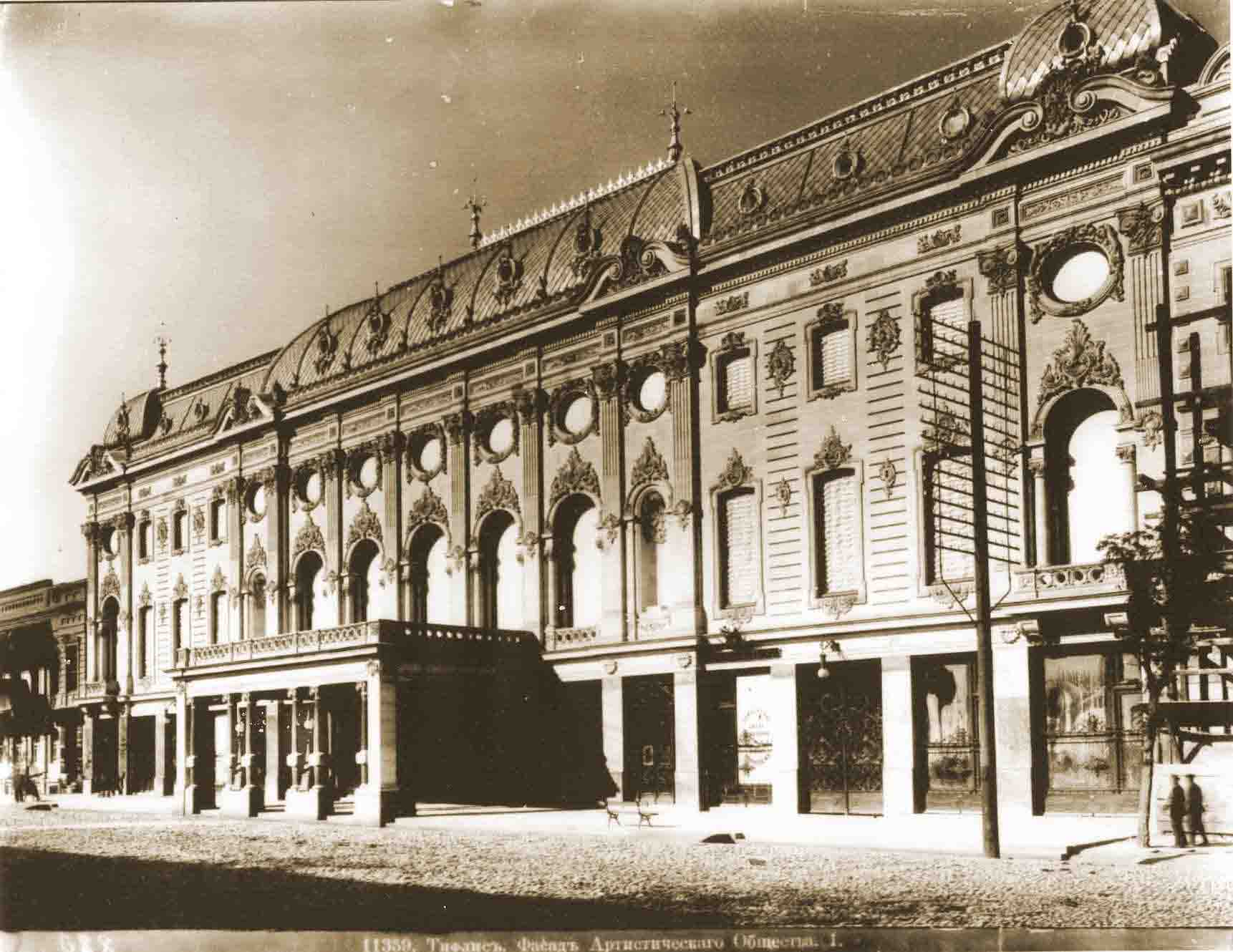
An early photo of Rustaveli Theatre.

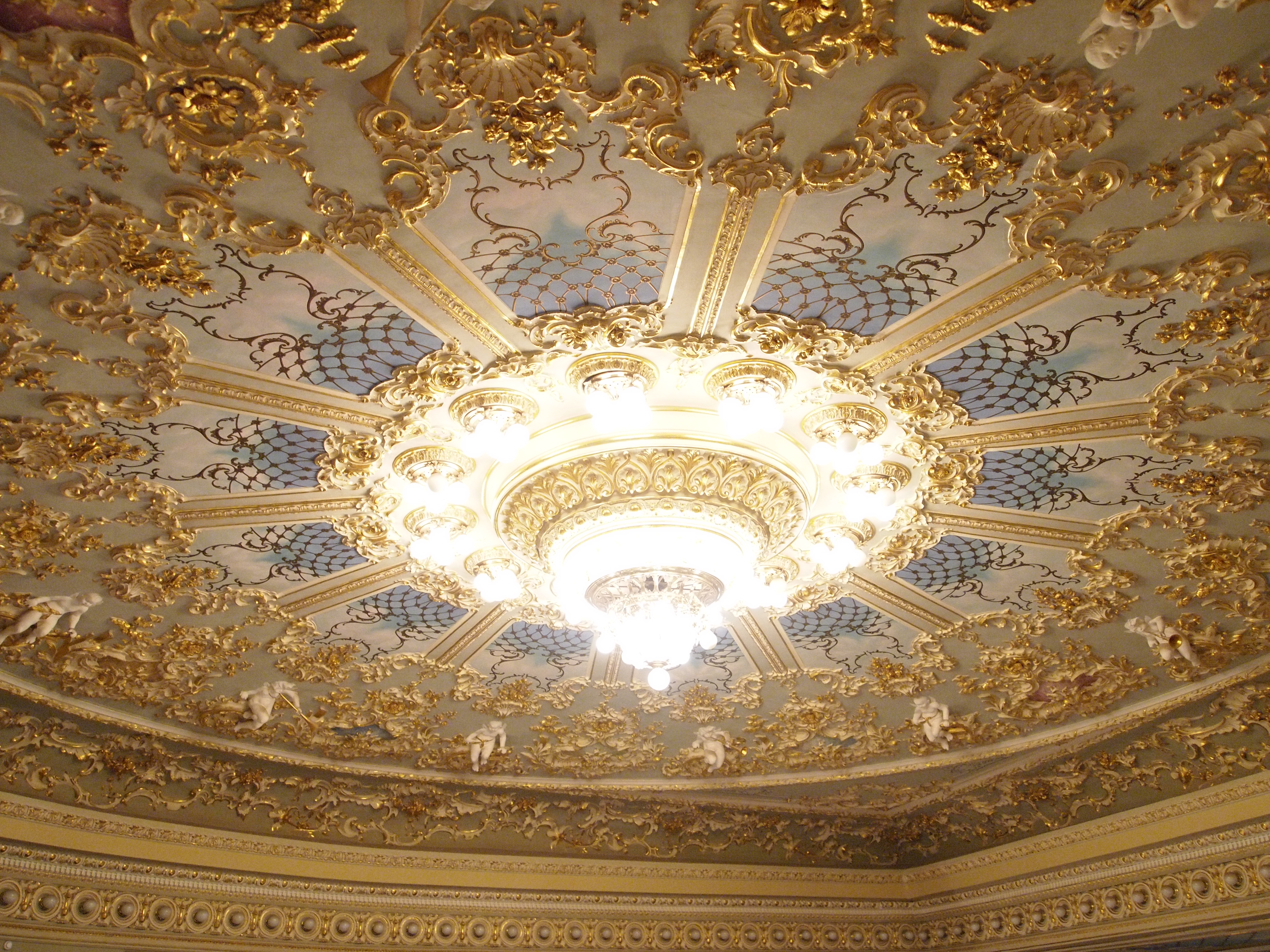
Rococo ceiling

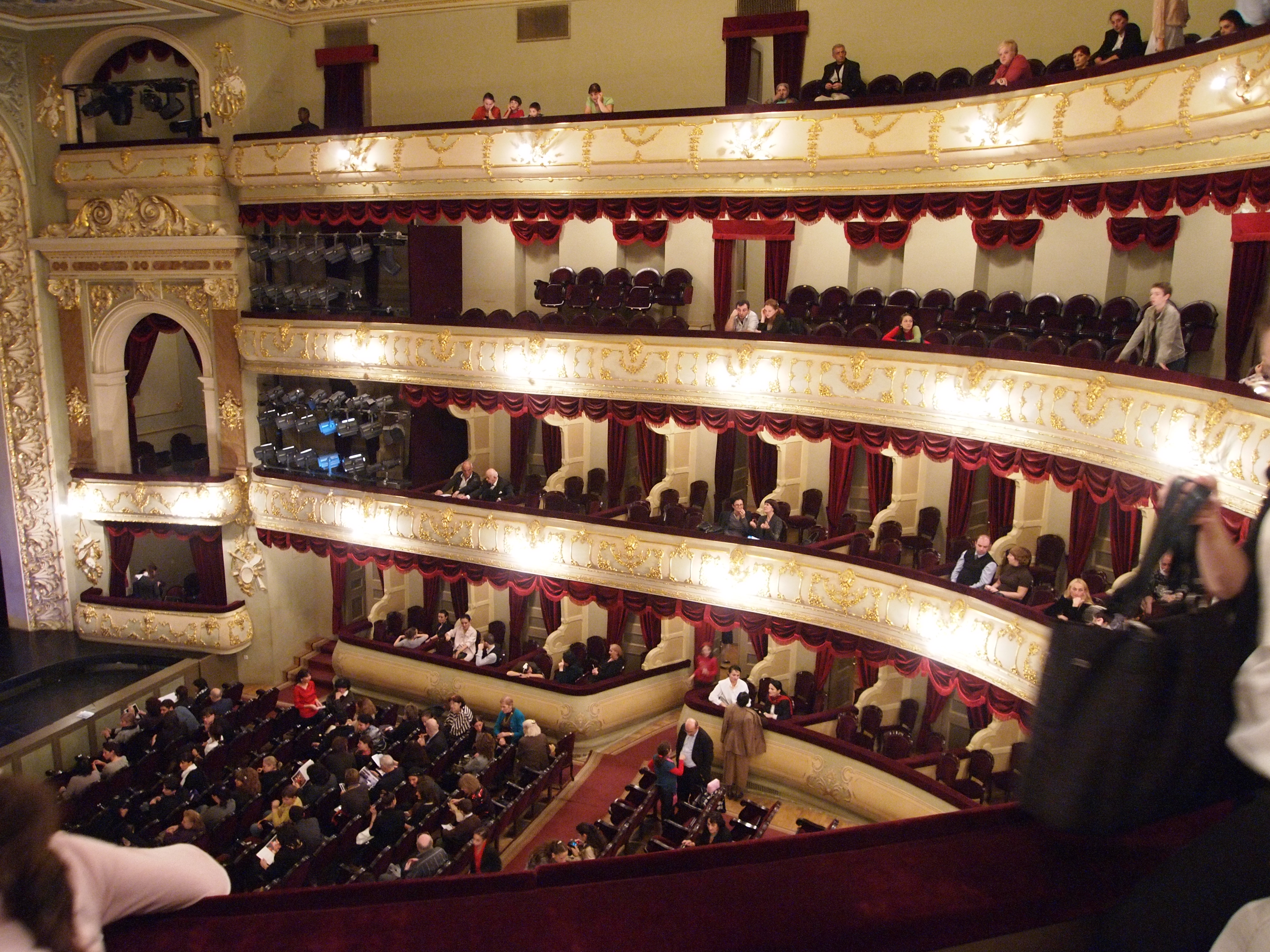
Audience boxes in the main hall

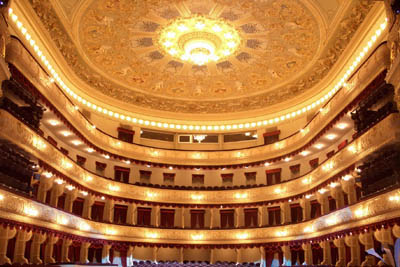
Audience boxes & decorative ceiling.
