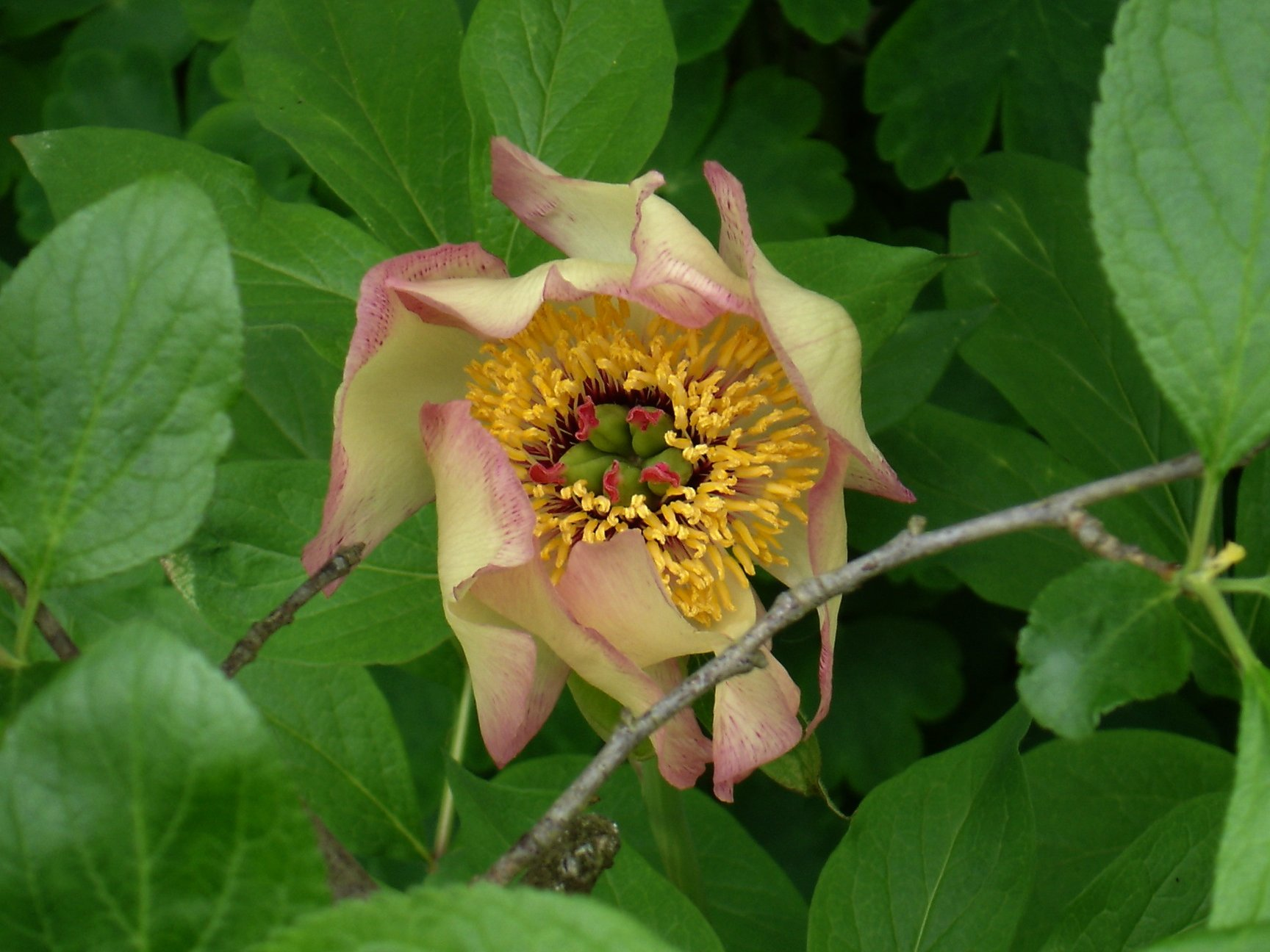

Scientific classification
- Kingdom: Plantae
- Clade: Tracheophytes
- Clade: Angiosperms
- Clade: Eudicots
- Order: Saxifragales
- Family: Paeoniaceae
- Genus: Paeonia
- Species: P. daurica
- Subspecies: P. d. subsp. wittmanniana

Trinomial name
- Paeonia daurica subsp. wittmanniana (Hartwiss ex Lindl.) D.Y.Hong

Synonyms
- Paeonia abchaisica Miscz ex Grossh.; Paeonia corallina var. wittmaniana (Steven) Albov; Paeonia wittmanniana Hartwiss ex Lindl.

= Paeonia daurica subsp. wittmanniana =

Subspecies of flowering plant

Paeonia daurica subsp. wittmanniana, also known as Wittmann's peony, is a perennial peony native to the southern Transcaucasian region. It was formerly regarded as a separate species, Paeonia wittmanniana, but in 2002, the Chinese botanist Hong Deyuan reduced it to a subspecies of Paeonia daurica. It is closely related to another subspecies of P. daurica, P. daurica subsp. mlokosewitschii.

Paeonia daurica subsp. wittmanniana is up to 1.5 m tall. Above the plant is glabrous and dark green; below it is lighter green, glaucescent, with white hairs especially crowded along the veins, and the lower leaves are biternate. Yellow to white flowers, 10–13 cm across, appear from April to June. The filaments are red and up to 1 cm long and the anthers are yellow to orange. The stamens are around 22 mm long. The divided leaf segments are ovate, cuneate, and often are oblique and abruptly cut off at the base.
