= Lagodekhi Protected Areas =

Protected nature reserves in Georgia

- IUCN category IV (habitat/species management area)
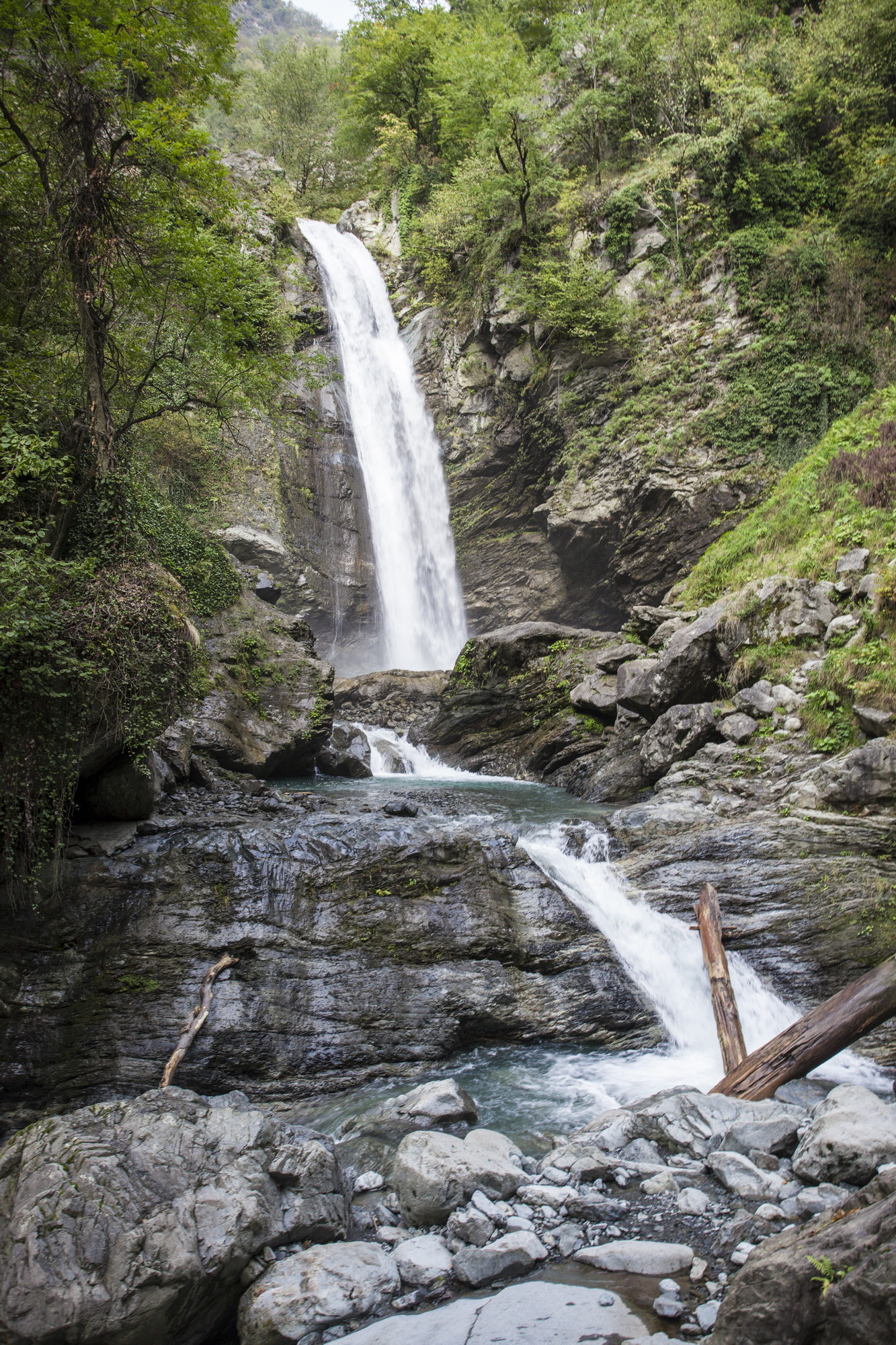
- Waterfall in Lagodekhi Protected Areas

- Location within Georgia Location within Kakheti
- Location: Georgia
- Coordinates: 41°54′00″N 46°20′00″E
- Area: 24,451 ha (60,420 acres)
- Established: 1912

Lagodekhi Protected Areas, also known as Lagodekhi National Park, is a pair of protected areas in the Kakheti district of Georgia: Lagodekhi Strict Nature Reserve and Lagodekhi Managed Nature Reserve (divided in 2003). The combined area of the two is 24,451 hectares (94.41 sq mi). The reserves are located in north-eastern Georgia on the southern slopes of the Caucasus and border Azerbaijan and Dagestan. Lagodekhi preserves a variety of rare local flora and fauna and was originally protected in 1912, under the Russian Empire, becoming the first such nature preserve on the territory of present-day Georgia. Their ecoregion is that of the Caucasus mixed forests.

== Location and topography ==
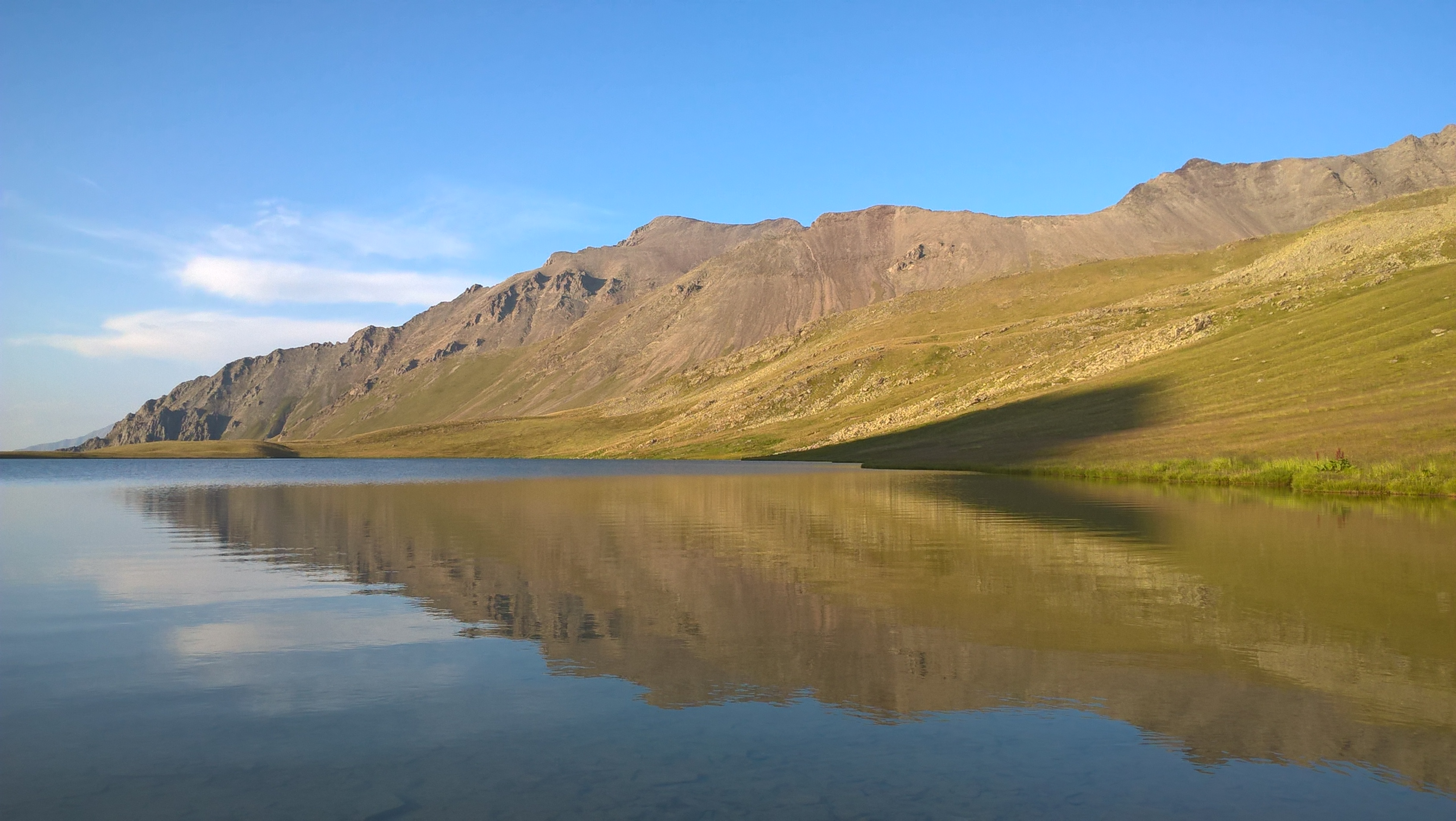
Lake Grdzeli

Lagodekhi Protected Areas are in north-eastern Georgia, on the southern slopes of the Caucasus, bordering Azerbaijan and the Dagestan republic of Russia. They comprise 19,749 hectares (76.25 sq mi) (strict nature reserve) and 4,702 hectares (18.15 sq mi) (managed nature reserve), extending from 590 to 3,500 metres (1,940 to 11,480 ft) above sea level, including several gorges. The major rivers flowing through the reserve are the Ninoskhevi, Shromiskhevi, Lagodekhistskali and Matsimistskali; at the higher elevations there are glacial lakes, of which the largest is Lake Grdzeli or Khala-Khel, on the Russian border, with a depth of 14 metres (46 ft). There are also sulphur springs.

The bulk of the strict nature reserve is accessible only for research purposes; the managed nature reserve contains tourist facilities including five trails: to Grouse Waterfall, to Ninoskhevi Waterfall, to the 11th-century Machi (or Machistsikhe) Castle, the Black Rock Route to Lake Grdzeli and knowledge of nature trail; the Black Rock Route also crosses the strict nature reserve. An agreement between Azerbaijan and Georgia allows hikers to cross the border freely to and from the reserve.

== Flora and fauna ==
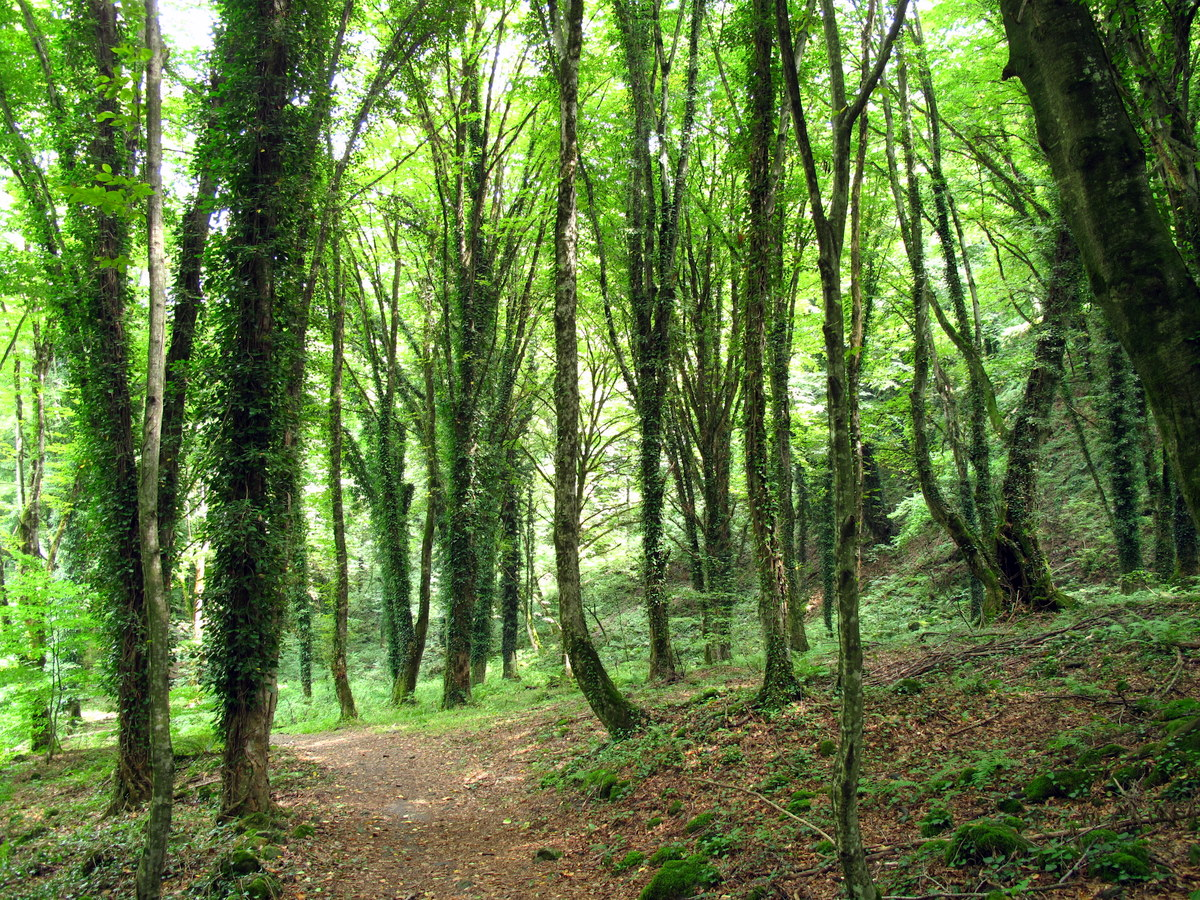
Hornbeam-beech forest

The reserves extend from beech forests (broadleaf woodland dominated by Oriental beech) to the Alpine zone. Approximately 70% of the area is forested; the second and third most prominent trees are European hornbeam and various species of maple (particularly velvet maple, Cappadocian maple, field maple and Norway maple). The forest includes a wide variety of plant species; reputedly almost two thirds of those found in the entire country; and the lowland parts have been compared to the warm temperate vegetation in the Black Sea region (locally called "subtropical"). Lagodekhi is also known for its animal life, and has been famous for its hunting. It is one of the major reserves for the East Caucasian tur and also has many chamois and red deer. Major predators include Eurasian lynx, grey wolf, brown bear, and the raptors bearded vulture, eastern imperial eagle, golden eagle and steppe eagle. Altogether 150 species of birds, 53 mammals, 5 amphibians, 12 reptiles, and 4 fish are found in the reserves; 26 of the plants and more than 40 of the animals are in the Red Data Book of Georgia listing of rare and endangered species.

The raccoon, an alien species, is also present in the Lagodekhi reserves.

== History ==
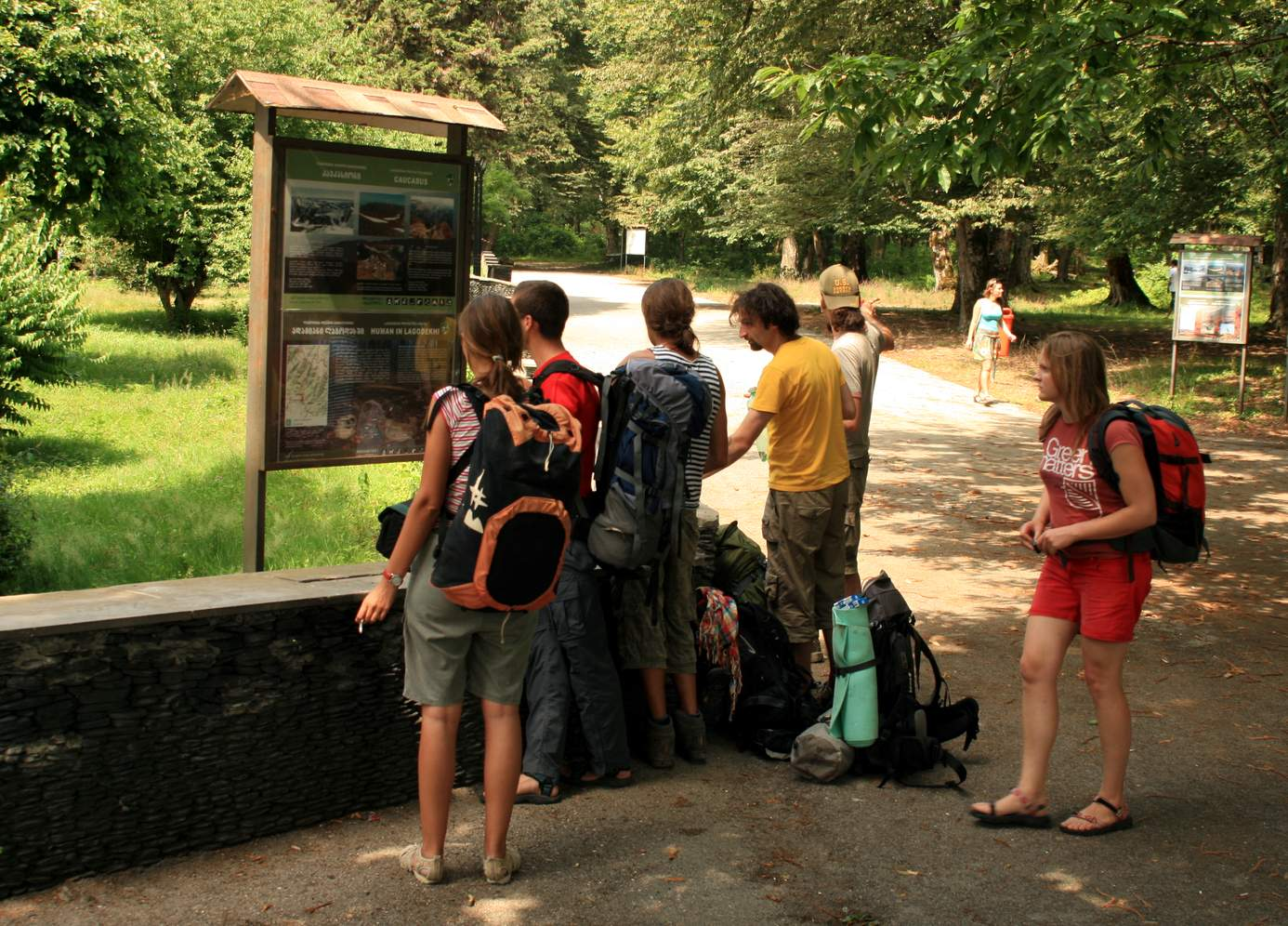
Tourists at the entrance to the reserve

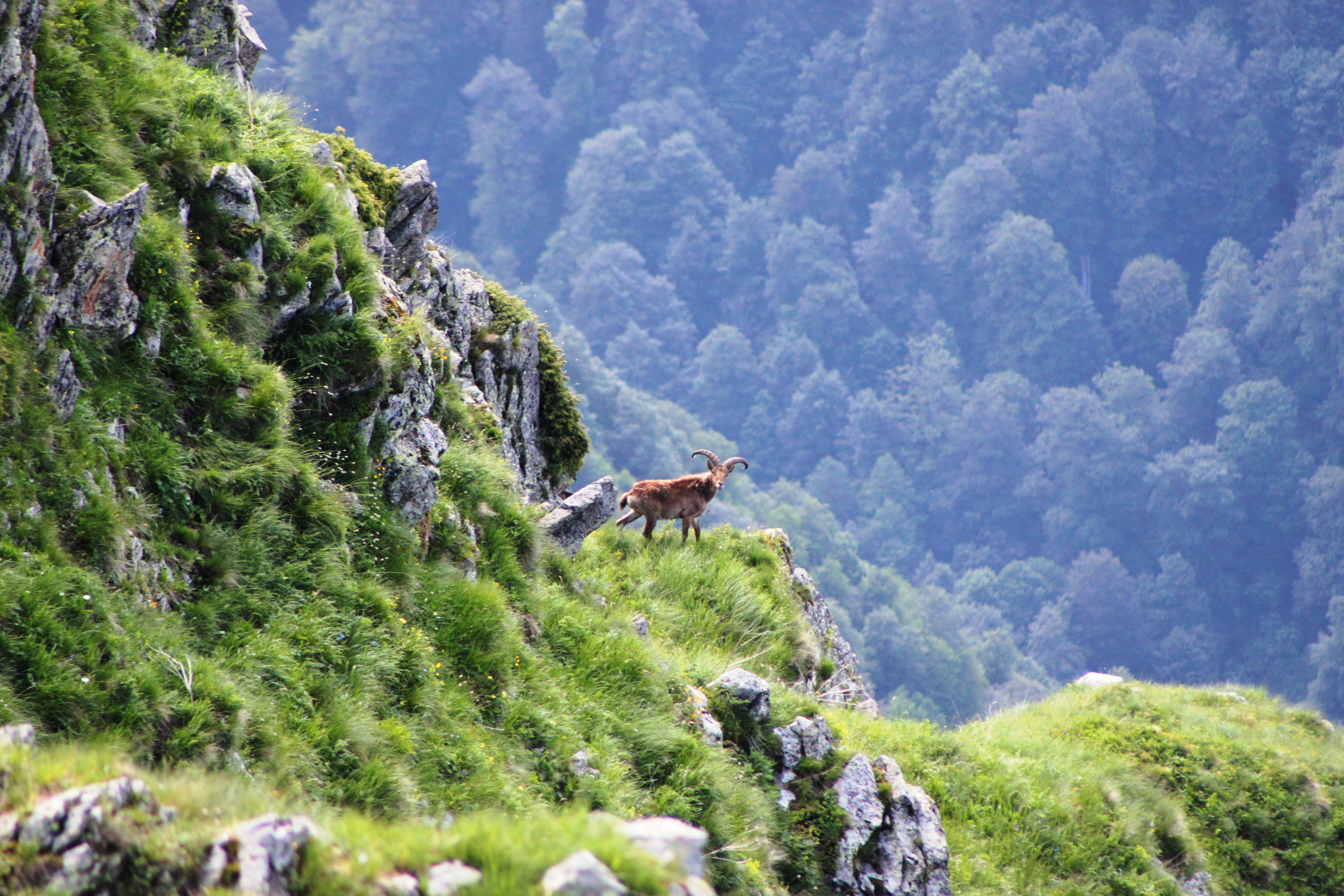
East Caucasian tur in the park.

The Lagodekhi reserves include archaeological traces of Bronze Age settlement and burials, especially in the village of Ulianovka.

The reserves originated with the Polish army officer and amateur naturalist Ludwik Młokosiewicz, who established a regimental park at the settlement of Lagodekhi while stationed with the garrison there. After resigning from the army out of pacifism in 1861, he was ultimately arrested on returning to Tiflis and sent back to Poland, but returned in 1867 and spent the rest of his life living with his family on a cottage farm in the forest, studying the flora and fauna of the area as Inspector of Forests for the Signakhi District. He discovered more than 60 species and supplied specimens to collections in other countries.

Beginning in 1889, Młokosiewicz urged that the area be protected, but this did not occur until 1912, after advocacy by the Imperial Russian Geographical Society and by Nikolai Ivanovich Kuznetsov, a professor of geobotany at the Imperial University of Dorpat (now Tartu). In response to his report and the society's urging that the forest no longer be used for firewood, the Tsar's viceregent in the Caucasus region accepted the application for a strict nature reserve, the first reserve to be established in the Caucasus region.

After the Russian Revolution, poaching and probably wood gathering were problems in the reserve. In 1929 it was again declared a strict nature reserve (zapovednik). The Soviets created other nature reserves as well as hunting reserves in Georgia, and in 1935, 1945 and 1970 increased the size of the Lagodekhi reserve; but conversely in 1951 they eliminated all zapovedniks in Georgia except for Lagodekhi, and again in 1962–64 reduced the number of such reserves while leaving Lagodekhi intact. It was also not used for experiments in rehabilitation of endangered species from other regions, as were some other strict reserves.

After the breakup of the Soviet Union and the re-establishment of independent Georgia in 1991, a period of war led to a great increase in poaching and reduction in the animal populations at Lagodekhi. In 1996 the country adopted the Laws on Protected Areas System and reclassified its natural areas under the International Union for Conservation of Nature schema, and in 2003 6,000 hectares (23 sq mi) were added to the reserve at Lagodekhi and it was divided into a large strict reserve and a small managed reserve in the strip of land between the strict reserve and the neighbouring villages, in which tourist facilities including an information building and trails were created. Following a pilot project involving the IUCN, the Georgian Society of Nature Friends and the Mlokosevich Society of Lagodekhi, an advisory board has been created, including representatives of Lagodekhi Municipality and local guides.

== See also ==
- Tusheti National Park
