= Lagodekhi Municipality =

Coordinates: 41°49′N 46°17′E

Lagodekhi Municipality ლაგოდეხის მუნიციპალიტეტი
- Municipality
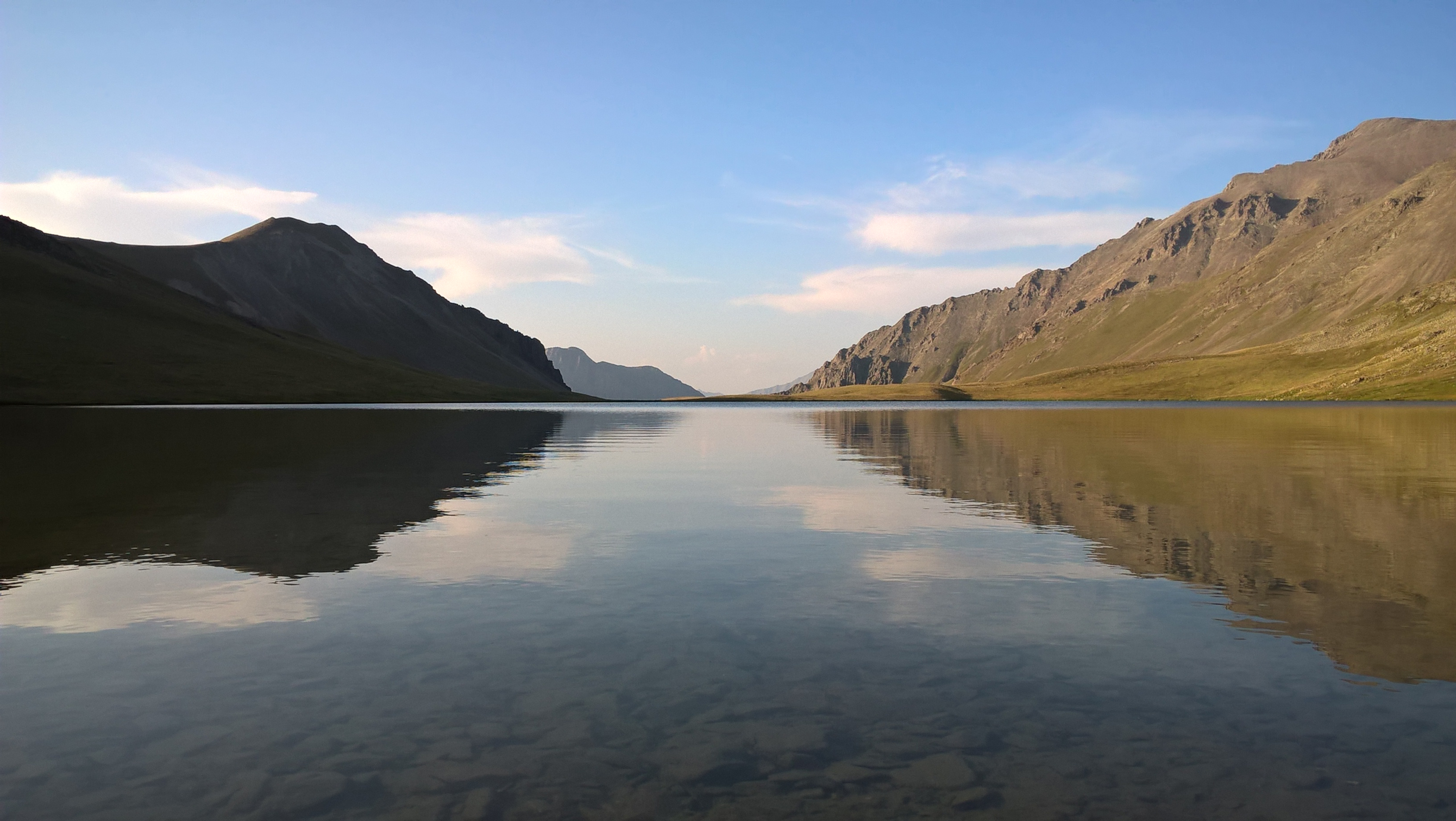
- Lagodekhi Protected Areas

- Flag Seal

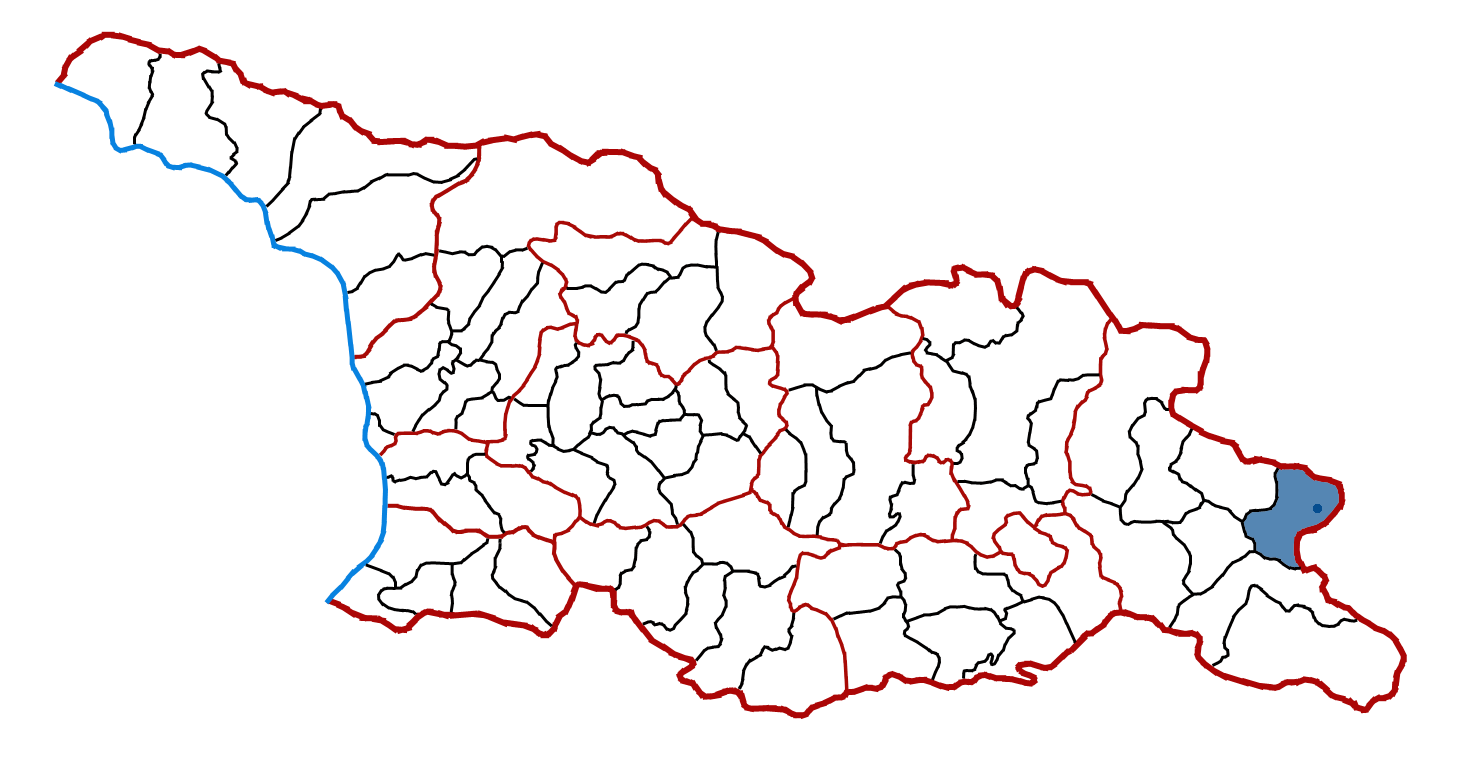
- Lagodekhi Municipality
- Country: Georgia
- Mkhare: Kakheti
- capital city: Lagodekhi

Government
  - mayor: Jondo Mdivnishvili

Area
  - Total: 890.2 km^{2} (343.7 sq mi)

Population (2014)
  - Total: 41,678
  - Density: 46.82/km^{2} (121.3/sq mi)

Population by ethnicity
  - Georgians: 71,49 %
  - Azerbaijanis: 23,04 %
  - Ossetians: 2,38 %
  - Russians: 1,76 %
  - Armenians: 0,84 %
- Time zone: UTC+4 (Georgian Standard Time)
- Website: http://www.lagodekhi.gov.ge/ge

Lagodekhi (Georgian: ლაგოდეხის მუნიციპალიტეტი) is the administrative-territorial unit in Eastern Georgia, in the Kakheti region. It is bordered by the Republic of Azerbaijan to the east, Kvareli Municipality to the west, the Autonomous Republic of Dagestan to the north, and Sighnaghi and Gurjaani municipalities to the south. The administrative center of the municipality is Lagodekhi.

== History ==
The territory of Lagodekhi municipality was included in Sighnaghi Mazra of Tbilisi province until 1917. Since 1921 it has been the administrative-territorial division of Sighnaghi Mazra in the Georgian SSR, and since 1930 it has become an independent district. It has been called Lagodekhi Municipality since 2006.

The name Lagodekhi is first mentioned in the Juansher Juansheriani Chronicle - History and life of King Vakhtang Gorgasali which confirms the toponym Lakuast or Lakvast (Lakva means a watery place according to Sulkhan-Saba Orbeliani).

== Administrative divisions and population ==
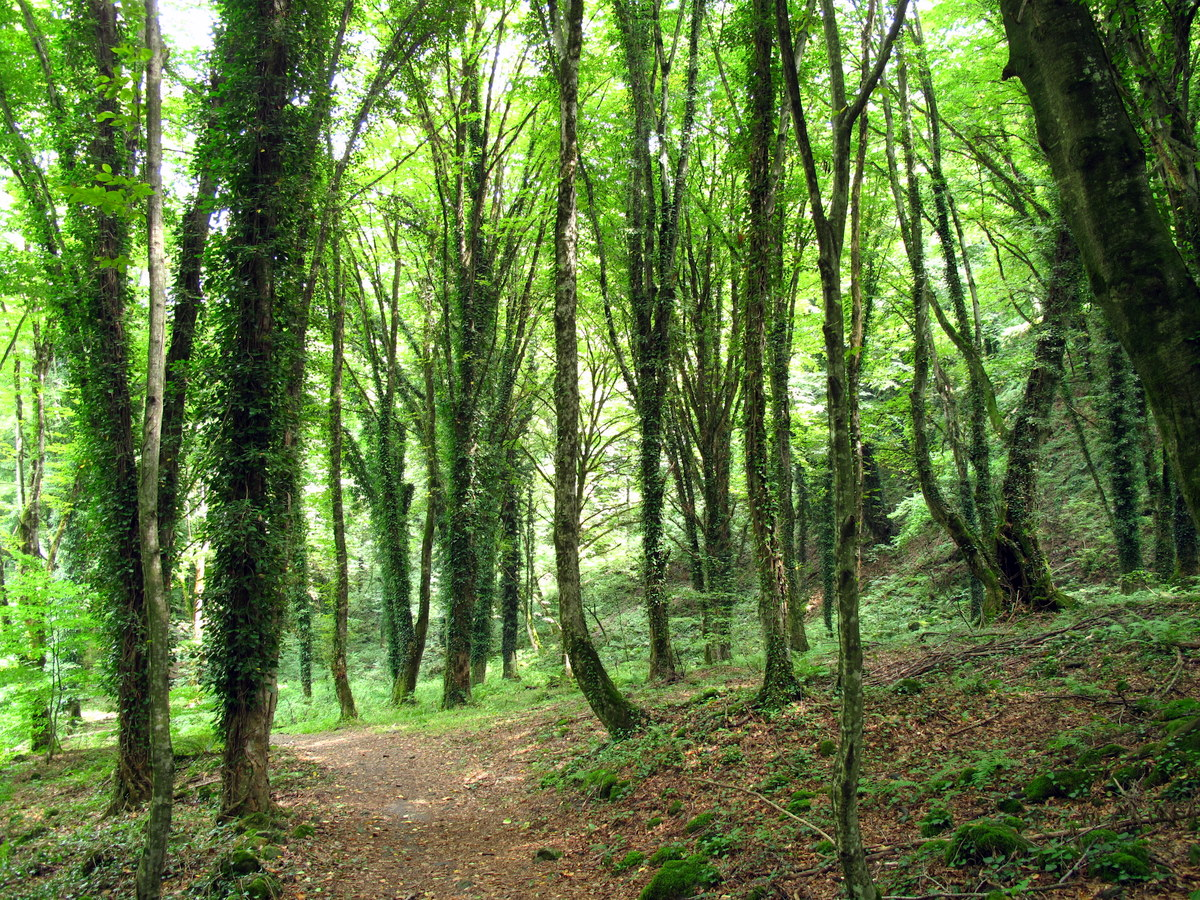
Hornbeam-beech forest

As of January 1, 2021, the population of Lagodekhi Municipality was 41.2 thousand people. 5.7 thousand live in urban areas and 35.4 thousand in rural areas.

Lagodekhi Municipality is a group of settlements that have administrative boundaries and an administrative center - the city of Lagodekhi. Lagodekhi Municipality has an elected representative Assembly (Sakrebulo) and an executive body (City Hall), a registered population, own property, budget, and revenues. The municipality is a legal entity of public law.

There are 15 administrative units in the municipality. In addition to Lagodekhi, there are 67 settlements:

- Administrative unit – City of Lagodekhi
- Administrative unit - Areshperani (including Zemo Bolkvi, Kevkhiani, Kvemo Bolkvi, Khoshatiani)
- Administrative unit - Apeni (including Baghdadi, Gvimriani, Zemo Nashovari, Onanauri, Phodaani, Kvemo Nashovari, Chabukiani)
- Administrative unit - Baisubani (including Zemo Mskhalgori, Patara Gori, Kvemo Mskhalgori)
- Administrative unit - Giorgeti (including Gujareti, Verkhvis Mindori, Lapniani, Pichkhisbogiri)
- Administrative unit - Vardisubani (including Mshvidobiani, Sakobo, Svideba)
- Administrative unit - Kabali (including Ganjala, Uzuntala, Karajala)
- Administrative unit - Kartubani (including Bolokiani, Naendrovali, Natsiskvilari)
- Administrative unit - Leliani (including Balta, Beburiani, Meore Leliani, Mirskiseuli, Namesrali, Qalqva)
- Administrative unit - Matsimi (including Rachisubani)
- Administrative unit - Ninigori (including Ganatleba, Gelati, Zemo Gurgeniani, Zemo Khiza, Kvemo Gurgeniani, Khizabavra)
- Administrative unit - Phona (including Dona, Zemo Phona, Kvemo Phona, Zemo Khechili, Kvemo Khechili)
- Administrative unit - Shroma (including Kavshiri)
- Administrative unit - Tsodniskari (including Davitiani, Tela, Sheerteba, Chaduniani, Tsiplistskaro)
- Administrative unit - Chiauri (including Eretiskari, Tamariani, Tsitelgori).

== Geography ==
The territory of Lagodekhi municipality belongs to a moderately humid subtropical climate. The area is characterized by relatively cold winters and hot summers. The average annual temperature is 13 °C. Annual precipitation ranges from 650 mm to 1080 mm. Hail and drought are typical for the local climate. The mountainous parts have a moderately humid climate, with cold winters and cool summers, and an annual rainfall of 1200–1800 mm.

Lagodekhi municipality is rich in surface and groundwater. The main hydrographic network is formed by the Alazani River, which flows on the border of Gurjaani and Sighnaghi municipalities. Kabali, Matsimistskali, Lagodekhistskali, Areshi, and Apeniskhevi are the other main rivers of the municipality.

== Politics ==
Lagodekhi Municipal Assembly (Georgian: ლაგოდეხის საკრებულო) is a representative body in Lagodekhi Municipality, currently consisting of 30 members. The council assembles regularly to consider subject matters such as code changes, utilities, taxes, municipal budget, oversight of municipal government and more. The Municipal Assembly and Mayor are elected every four years. The last election was held in October 2021.

Party	2017	2021	Current Municipal Assembly
Georgian Dream	20	16	
United National Movement	3	9	
Strategy Aghmashenebeli		2	
For Georgia	1 (Note: Split from GD.)	1	
People's Power		1 (Note: Split from GD.)	
Independent	4	1	
European Georgia	2		
Alliance of Patriots	1		
Total	31	30	

== Education ==
There are 28 public schools and 31 pre-schools in Lagodekhi municipality. The number of school students is 6235, and the number of children in pre-schools is 1513.[As of what year?] There are 5 libraries in Lagodekhi Municipality. Namely: 1 Central Library and 4 rural libraries (villages of Vardisubani, Giorgeti, Kartubani, and Leliani). There is a branch of Aisi Public College in the village of Shroma, Lagodekhi Municipality.

The Union of Art Schools of Lagodekhi Municipality unites 4 music schools and 1 art school: Lagodekhi Art School, Apeni village Art School, Leliani village Art School, Vardisubani village Art School, and Lagodekhi Painting School.

== Culture ==
There is a People's Drama Theater, a museum, a Children's Theater, a People's Puppet Theater, a folk ensemble Graali, a choreographic ensemble Hereti, a choreographic ensemble Lakvasta, a choreographic ensemble Ilieli.

The exhibition hall of Lagodekhi Protected Areas is located in the city of Lagodekhi.

=== Festivals and public holidays ===
Event	Date	Description
Heretoba	Autumn	This public holiday is traditionally celebrated in autumn. Locals, along with the guests, are invited to learn about the achievements of the municipality, attend the awarding ceremony of the honorary citizens and successful athletes, as well as concerts of choreographic and pop ensembles.
"Tevdoroba"	Seven weeks before Easter	Remembrance Day of St. Theodore is celebrated seven weeks before Easter in the village of Leliani. Sports and cultural events are held after the festive liturgy.
"Mamukaoba"	April 9	A day dedicated to the memory of Mamuka Nozadze is celebrated in the village of Kartubani. The leadership of the municipality together with the local population lay a wreath at the grave of Mamuka Nozadze. Prayer of remembrance is led in the church.
"Kostaoba"	21 September	An event dedicated to the anniversary of Ossetian writer and public figure Kosta Khetagurov is celebrated on September 21 in the village of Areshperani, where sports and cultural events are held; Guests have the opportunity to taste traditional Georgian dishes and share the customs of the Georgian table.
Novruz Bayram	March	The holiday means a new day, the equalization of day and night, the warming of the air, the beginning of the melting of snow, the emergence of twigs on trees, and the revitalization of the earth. This holiday is considered a New Year holiday by Azerbaijanis.

== Sports ==
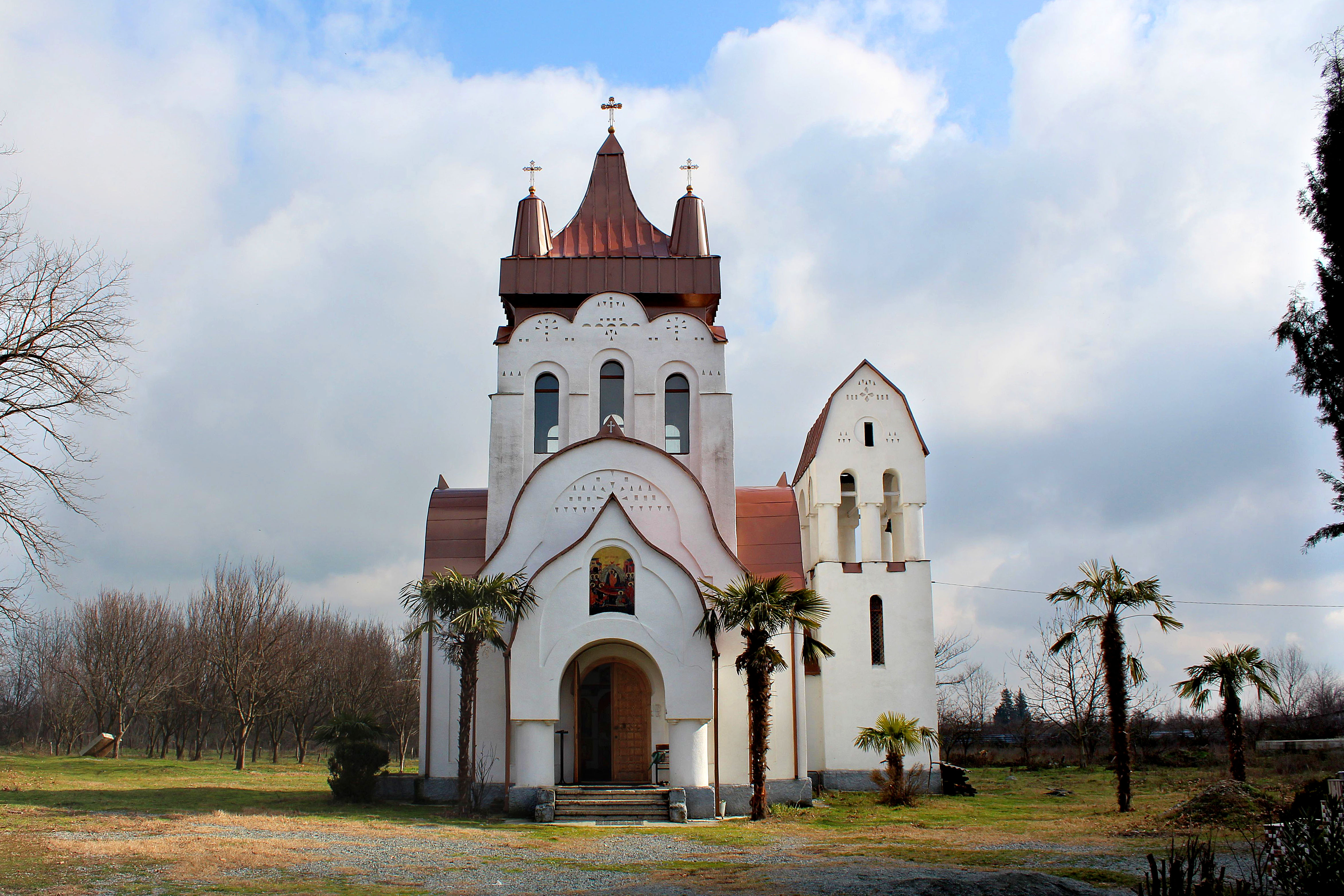
Church of the Assumption of the Virgin in Lagodekhi

The following sports complexes are working under the Center for Culture, Sports and Youth Development of Lagodekhi Municipality:

- Sports complex located at 12 Zakatla St., Lagodekhi
- Rani sports ground on St. Nino Street, Lagodekhi
- Sports complex located in the village of Chabukiani, Lagodekhi Municipality
- Field with the artificial surface on Zakatala Street, Lagodekhi
- Field with the artificial surface on Kudgori Street, Lagodekhi
- Field with the artificial surface on Rustaveli lane, Lagodekhi
- Sports complex located in Tsodniskari Village, Lagodekhi Municipality.

== Tourism ==
Visitors interested in ecotourism, adventure, and cultural tourism often visit Lagodekhi municipality.

According to the statistical information of the Agency of Protected Areas, as of August 2021, the number of visitors was 3432; 6079 visitors were registered in 2020, 59,761 visitors-in 2019. 57,472 people visited Lagodekhi protected areas in 2018.

There are no tourist information centers in Lagodekhi Municipality, although it is possible to determine the desired tourist routes together with the Lagodekhi Protected Areas Administration.

== Economy ==
The revenues of the municipality are provided by agriculture, tourism, trade, and production development, including local revenues and equalization transfers. The leading fields are agriculture, including tobacco growing, production of grain and essential oil crops, viticulture, fruit growing, horticulture, and animal husbandry. There are tobacco fermentation, wine, cheese, and butter factories. Small enterprises of other profiles also work in the municipality. Lagodekhi-Zakatala road of international importance passes through the territory of the municipality, where the Lagodekhi customs is located.

== Historical landmarks and sightseeing ==
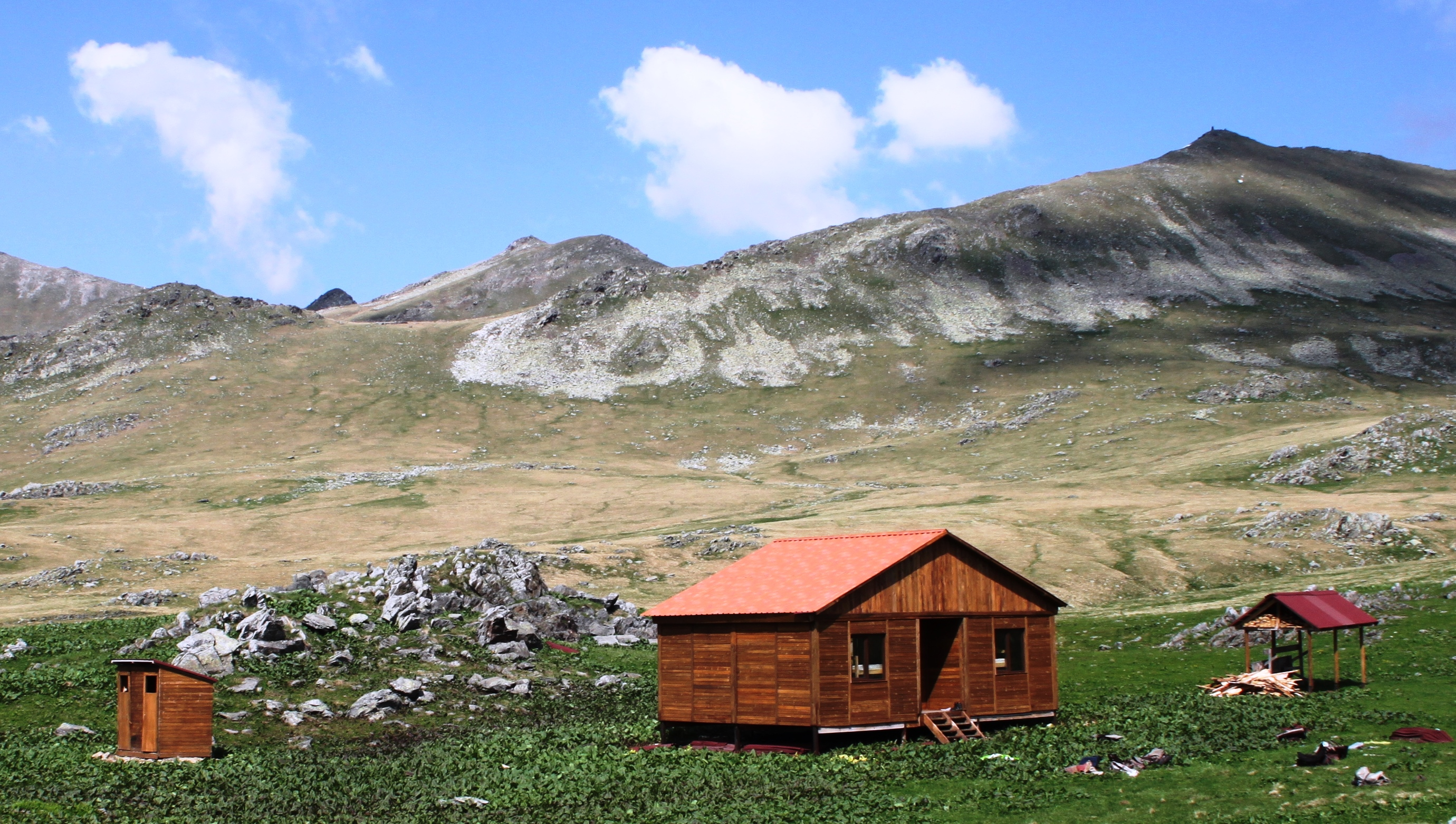
Lagodekhi

The church of St. Theodore in the village of Leliani, built in the XI-XII centuries, stands out from the architectural monuments of Lagodekhi Municipality. So-called Leliani treasure is found in the village, in the 20s of the last century. Other historical monuments are Poni, Areshperan, and Khoshat churches.

=== Lagodekhi Protected Areas ===
Lagodekhi Protected Areas include Lagodekhi Nature Reserve (19755 ha) and Managed Reserve (4500 ha). At present, there are five tourist trails in managed reserve of Lagodekhi Protected Areas: Grouse waterfall, Ninoskhevi waterfall, Machi castle, Black Rock Lake, and nature interpretation trail.

The central entrance of Lagodekhi Protected Areas is integrated into administrative and visitor complexes. Exposition and exhibition halls are arranged in the administrative building, where visitors have the opportunity to become familiar with the specifics of Lagodekhi protected areas, get information about existing tariffs, safety rules, and choose a desirable route from existing tourist trails with appropriate services.

=== Lagodekhi Local Museum ===
The museum was founded in 1975. The fund of the museum mainly consists of the materials obtained as a result of archeological excavations in Old Hereti and the surrounding area: stone, bronze, various items of clay, jewelry, work tools, numismatics; A little number of ethnographic and photographic materials of the region are also presented there.

== Notable people ==
Photo	Name	Years	Description
	Vladimer Tsikarishvili	1971-	Neurosurgeon
	Dea Kulumbegashvili	1986-	Film director and screenwriter.
	Elene Kebadze	1994-	Sportswoman

== Twin towns ==
- Viļāni Municipality, Latvia
- Ostrołęka, Poland

== See also ==
- List of municipalities in Georgia (country)
