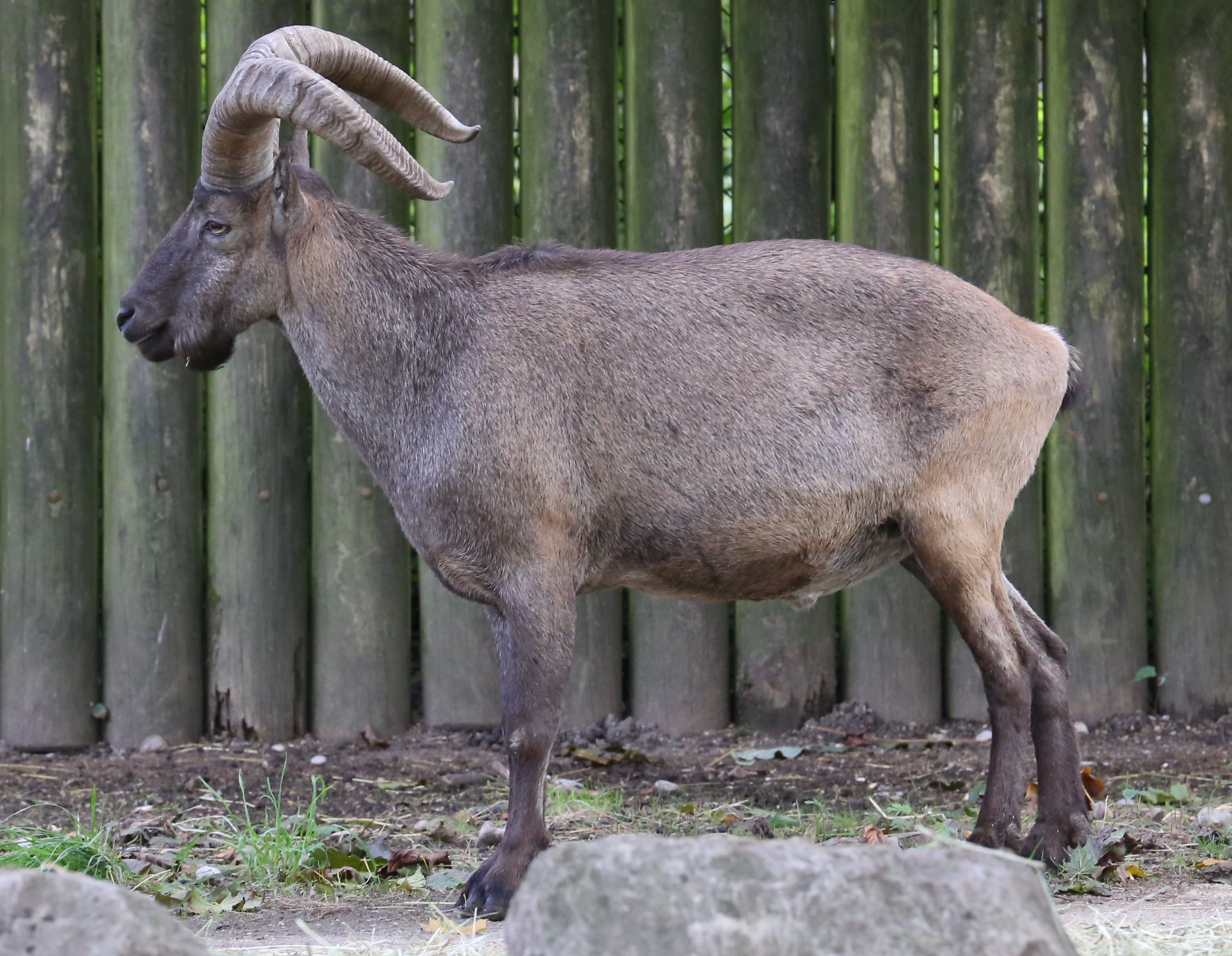
- At Zoo Augsburg

Conservation status
- Near Threatened (IUCN 3.1)

Scientific classification
- Kingdom: Animalia
- Phylum: Chordata
- Class: Mammalia
- Order: Artiodactyla
- Family: Bovidae
- Subfamily: Caprinae
- Tribe: Caprini
- Genus: Capra
- Species: C. cylindricornis

Binomial name
- Capra cylindricornis (Blyth, 1841)

= East Caucasian tur =

Species of mammal

The East Caucasian tur (Capra cylindricornis) is a mountain-dwelling caprine living in the eastern half of the Greater Caucasus mountains, in Azerbaijan, Georgia, and European Russia. It inhabits rough mountainous terrain, where it eats mainly grasses and leaves. It is listed as near threatened on the IUCN Red List.

== Description ==
East Caucasian turs are goat-like animals with large but narrow bodies and short legs, and show significant sexual dimorphism in overall size and horn development. Adult males stand about 105 cm (41 in) at the shoulder, measure 190 cm (75 in) in head-body length, and weigh around 140 kg (310 lb). The equivalent figures for adult females are 85 cm (33 in) for shoulder height, 138 cm (54 in) for head-body length, and just 56 kg (123 lb) for weight. Males have slightly lyre-shaped horns which reach 70 to 90 cm (28 to 35 in) in length, while in females they are typically only 20 to 22 cm (7.9 to 8.7 in) long.

The summer coat is short and sandy-yellow, with dirty white underparts. Also, dark brown stripes occur along the front surface of the legs and on the upper surface of the tail. In the winter, the coats of females and juvenile males becomes slightly greyish in colour, but otherwise remain similar. However, the winter coats of adult males are a solid dark brown, without visible stripes on the legs. Males develop a beard with their winter coats in their second year, reaching the full length of about 12 cm (4.7 in) by their fourth or fifth year. Compared with other goats, the beards of East Caucasian turs are relatively stiff, and project somewhat forwards, rather than drooping down. The beard is small or entirely absent in females, and in males in their summer coats.

== Distribution and habitat ==
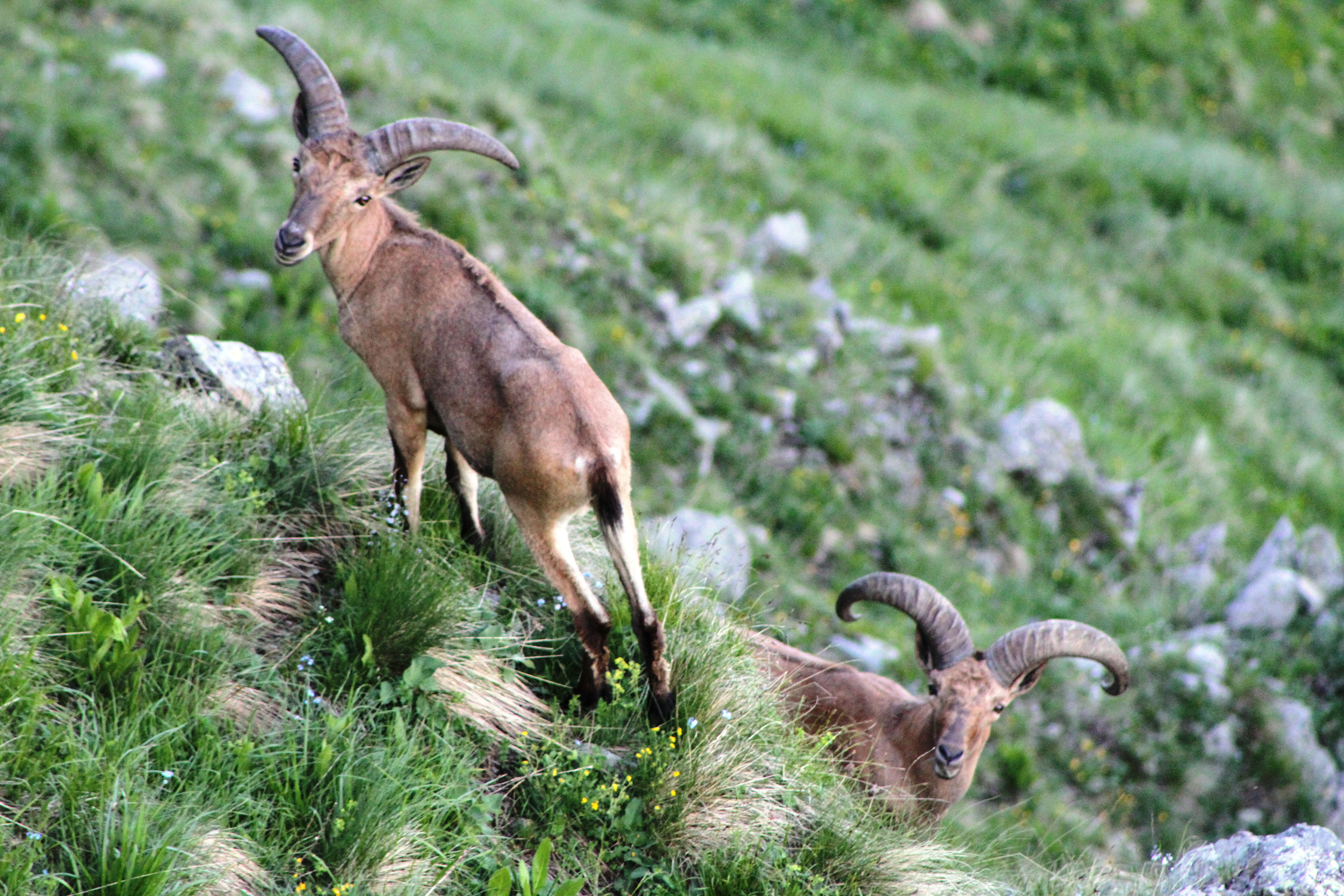
East Caucasian tur in Lagodekhi Protected Areas, Georgia.

The species range is restricted to the Greater Caucasus Mountains between 800 and 4,000 m (2,600 and 13,100 ft) above sea level, roughly extending from Mt. Shkhara (Georgia) in the west to Mt. Babadag (Azerbaijan) in the east. The western edge of the range of the East Caucasian tur remains unclear, as it overlaps with that of West Caucasian tur (Capra caucasica). Most of the species populations avoid human disturbance and occur in extremely rugged, open terrain around 3,000 m. In areas with no or little human disturbance, turs occur in gentler and much lower terrain.

== Behaviour and ecology ==
=== Reproduction ===
Breeding occurs from late November to early January, with births taking place in May and June, after a gestation period of 160 to 165 days. Newborn turs weigh 3.4 to 4.1 kg (7.5 to 9.0 lb); they are usually singletons, although about 3% of pregnancies result in twin births. Young turs are extremely agile, being able to scamper about steep slopes after only a day of life. They generally start sampling grasses after one month, but continue to suckle until about December. Growth is relatively slow, with females not reaching their full adult size for five years, and males at around 10 or 11 years of age. Females reach sexual maturity at two years, but, in the wild, usually do not breed until the age of four.

East Caucasian turs are able to cross-breed with West Caucasian turs and with domestic goats, producing fertile offspring, although this is not common in the wild.

=== Diet ===
During the warm months, feeding occurs at intervals throughout the late afternoon, night, and morning, with the hottest hours of the day being spent resting in sheltered places. In winter, herds may remain in open pastures throughout the day, alternately grazing and resting. Daily movements may cover 15 to 20 km (9.3 to 12.4 mi). They eat almost all kinds of available vegetation, but prefer forbs in spring and summer, and grasses, trees, and shrubs in autumn and winter.

Their seasonal migration covers a vertical distance of 1,500 to 2,000 m (4,900 to 6,600 ft), with an upward thrust in May and a retreat downwards in October. The adult males generally inhabit higher altitudes than females and their young, descending to join them in the breeding season. During the summer, the turs also make daily migrations, moving as much as 1,000 m (3,300 ft) vertically between feeding meadows and night-time resting spots.

During this rut, vigorous competitions arise as males vie for mating rights. Older males are dominant over younger ones, which they drive away from females using threatening postures, rushing, and occasional clashes with their horns. Fights between equally sized males are fiercer, beginning with both animals rearing on their hind legs and butting each other, before vigorous horn-wrestling that often results in the combatants rolling down steep slopes until one submits and leaves the group. During the rut, males also mark their territory by debarking and scent-marking tree trunks and heavy branches.

Outside of the rutting season, females live in stable groups with an average of seven individuals, often including a few juvenile males. Older males live in larger, single-sex groups, with an average of 12 members, while some younger males travel in groups of two or three. These male groups break up around November, when the rut begins and mixed-sex groups become the norm, reforming again in January or February. In protected areas, the density of animals varies between 5 and 16/km^{2} (13 and 41/sq mi).
