= Ludwik Młokosiewicz =

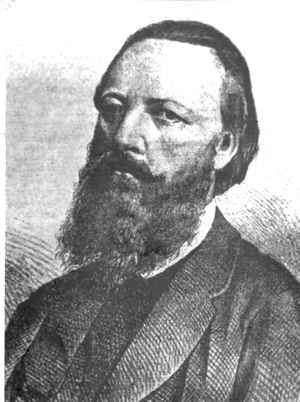
- Born: August 25, 1831; Warsaw
- Died: August 4, 1909 (aged 77)
- Burial place: Cemetery in Lagodekhi, Georgia
- Occupations: botanist, zoologist, explorer
- Father: Franciszek Młokosiewicz

Ludwik Franciszek Młokosiewicz (August 25, 1831 – 1909) was a Polish explorer, zoologist and botanist, who studied extensively in the Caucasus Mountains and discovered various species of plants and animals.

== Life ==
Młokosiewicz was born in Warsaw, into a wealthy and aristocratic family, son of Polish general Franciszek Młokosiewicz. He spent his childhood in Warsaw and Omięcin. At his father's request, from 1842 he attended the cadet corps in Brześć, however, not interested in a military career, he returned to Warsaw in 1846 and continued his education privately.

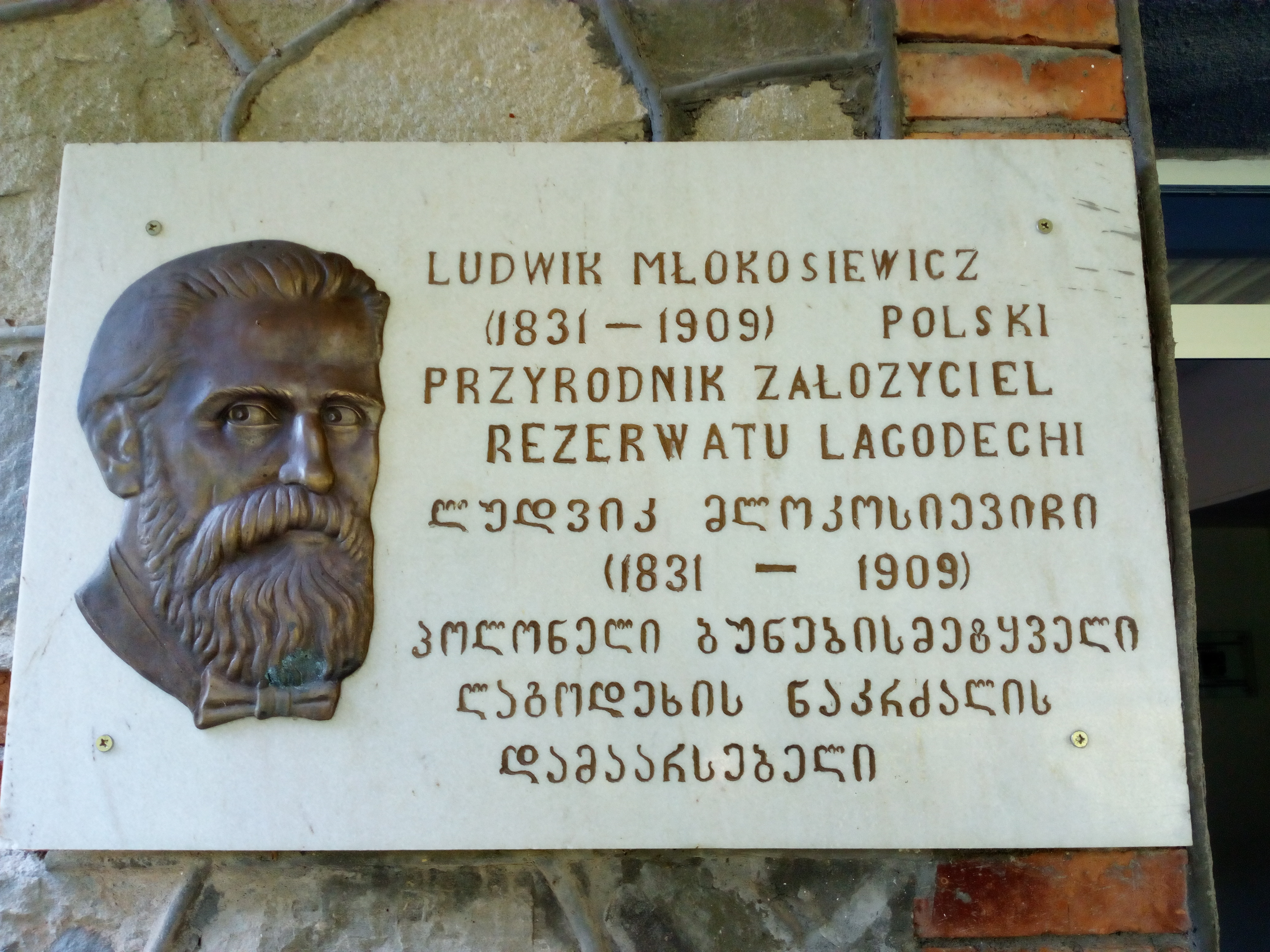
Memorial plaque to Ludwik Młokosiewicz in Lagodekhi

At the age of twenty-two, when he had to do his compulsory military service in the Imperial Russian Army, he voluntarily joined its Caucasian Division, and in 1853 he was sent to Lagodekhi, on the south-eastern slopes of the Caucasus, in Georgia. He used his botanical talents to plant a regimental park, orchard and water garden at Lagodekhi. In 1861 he resigned from the army and travelled south to explore the deserts of Persia. On his return he was arrested by the Russians and charged with inciting revolt amongst the Poles in the Caucasus. Despite his innocence of the charges, he was sentenced to six years' enforced residence in the province of Voronezh, and his botanical collections were confiscated.

In 1876 after restrictions had been lifted Młokosiewicz explored the mountains of Dagestan, and two years later returned to Persia, travelling as far as Balochistan. On his return he was appointed Inspector of Forests for the Signakhi District, remaining at Lagodekhi for the rest of his life. He supplied foreign museums with botanical and zoological specimens. He maintained contacts with museums and institutions in his hometown of Warsaw.

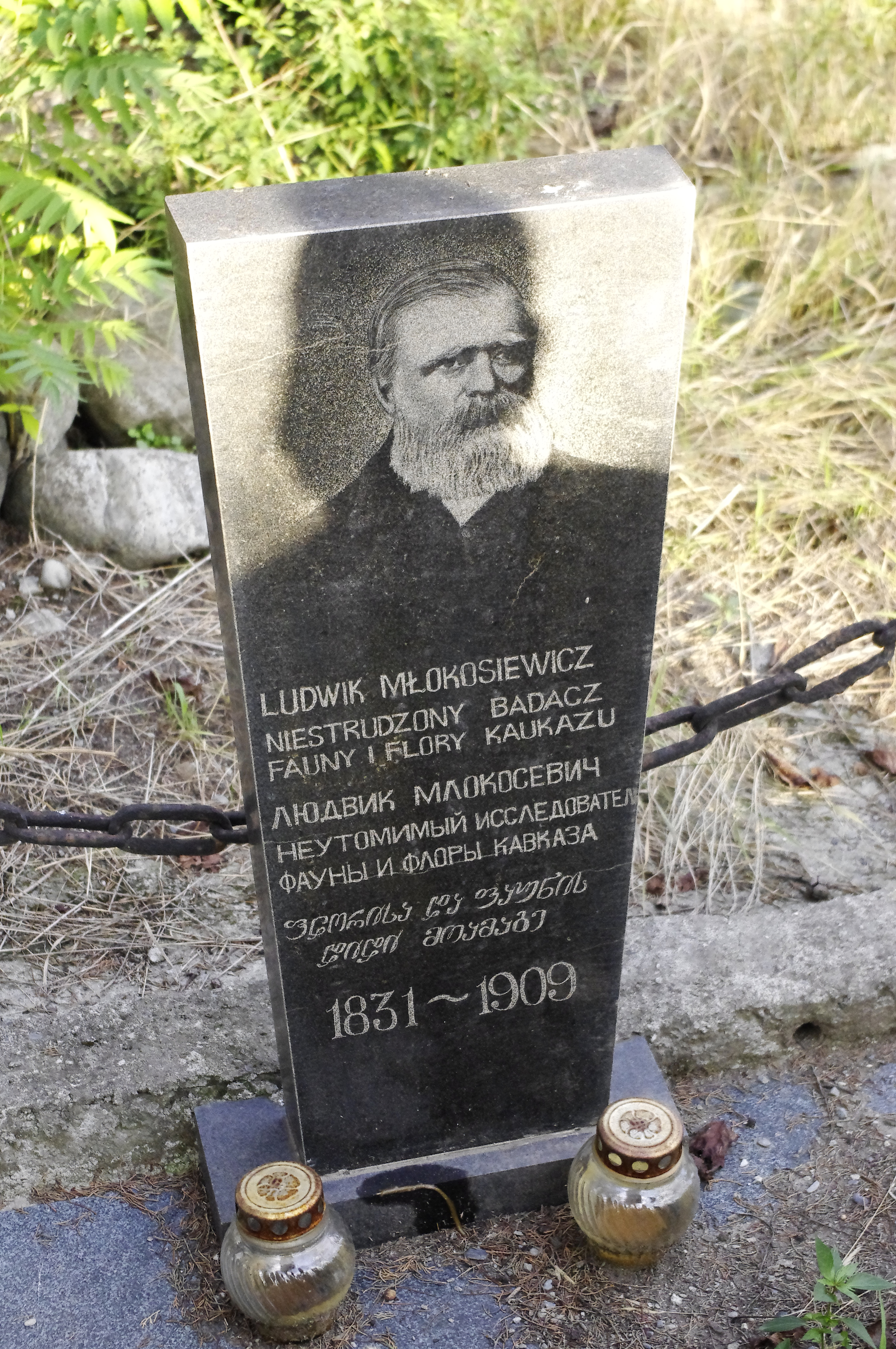
Multilingual tombstone dedicated to Młokosiewicz in Lagodekhi, Georgia.

Młokosiewicz discovered 60 species of plants and animals. Species that he discovered and that were named after him include the Caucasian black grouse (Tetrao mlokosiewiczi) and the golden peony (Paeonia mlokosewitschii). Beginning in 1889, Młokosiewicz urged the protection of the forested area at Lagodekhi; in 1912, three years after his death, the Russian viceregent in the Caucasus region declared what is now Lagodekhi Protected Areas.

Młokosiewicz's other contributions include inventing a method to eradicate malaria in Georgia, which won him widespread respect among the local people, and assisting the Georgian people as a social activist, for example by founding an agricultural school.

Młokosiewicz dies in 1909 and was buried at a local cemetery in Lagodekhi, Georgia.

== See also ==
- List of Poles
- Georgia–Poland relations
