= Lagodekhi =

Coordinates: 41°49′20″N 46°16′30″E

Lagodekhi ლაგოდეხი
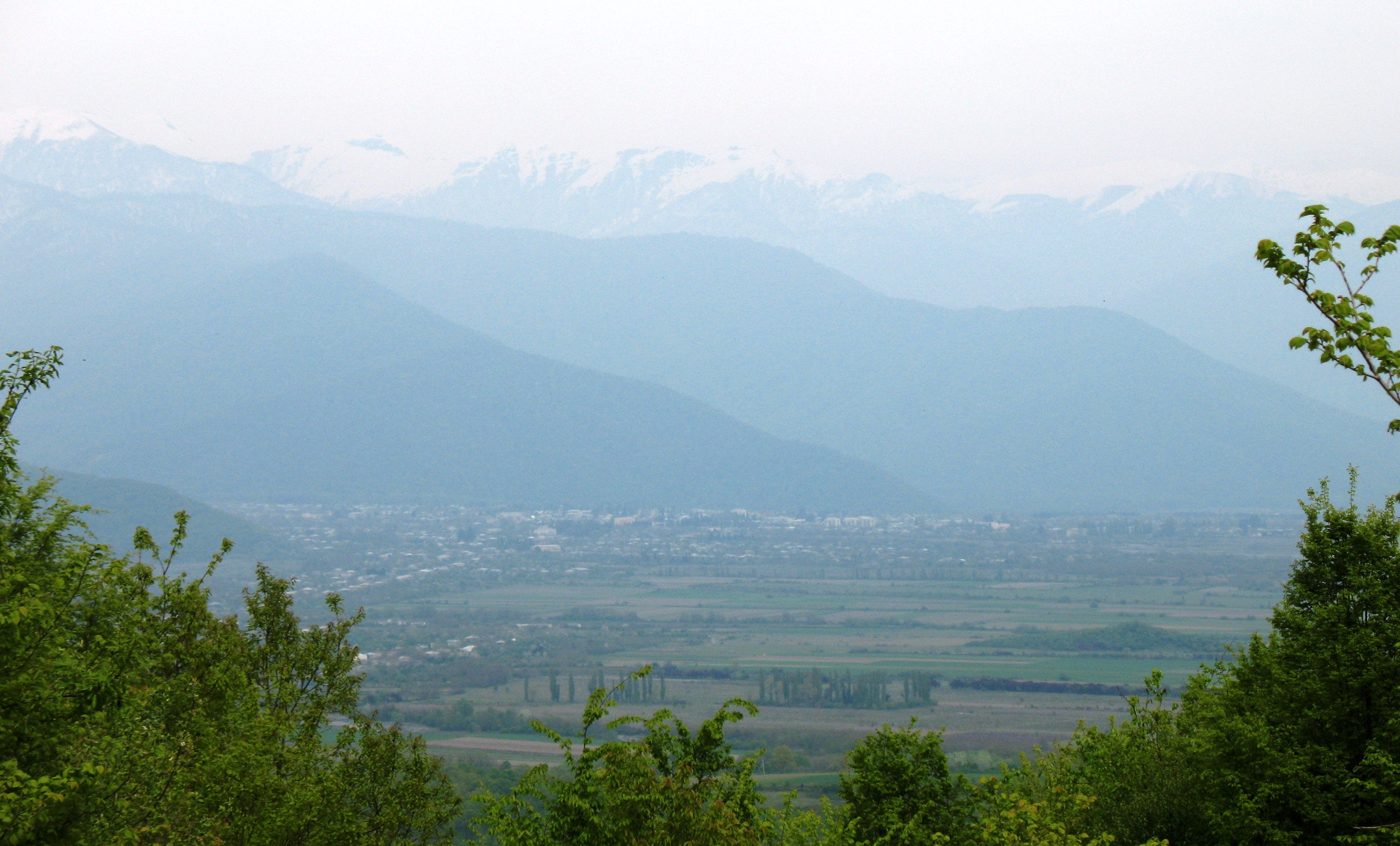
- View of the town

- Flag Seal
- Interactive map of Lagodekhi
- Country: Georgia
- Mkhare: Kakheti
- Municipality: Lagodekhi
- Foundation: 8th century
- Elevation: 450 m (1,480 ft)

Population (2024)
  - Total: 5,614
- Time zone: UTC+4 (Georgian Time)
- Area code: +995 354

Lagodekhi (Georgian: ლაგოდეხი) is a town, located at the foot of the Greater Caucasus mountains between the rivers Lagodekhiskhevi and Shromiskhevi, in the historical region of Hereti (now part of Kakheti). Lagodekhi has a number of nearby waterfalls and includes the Lagodekhi Nature Reserve, established in 1912 and first noted by Polish botanist Ludwik Młokosiewicz for having a variety of tree species. Three kilometers east of the town is the border crossing with Azerbaijan's Balakan Province. Lagodekhi is in the Kakheti district of Georgia.

== History ==
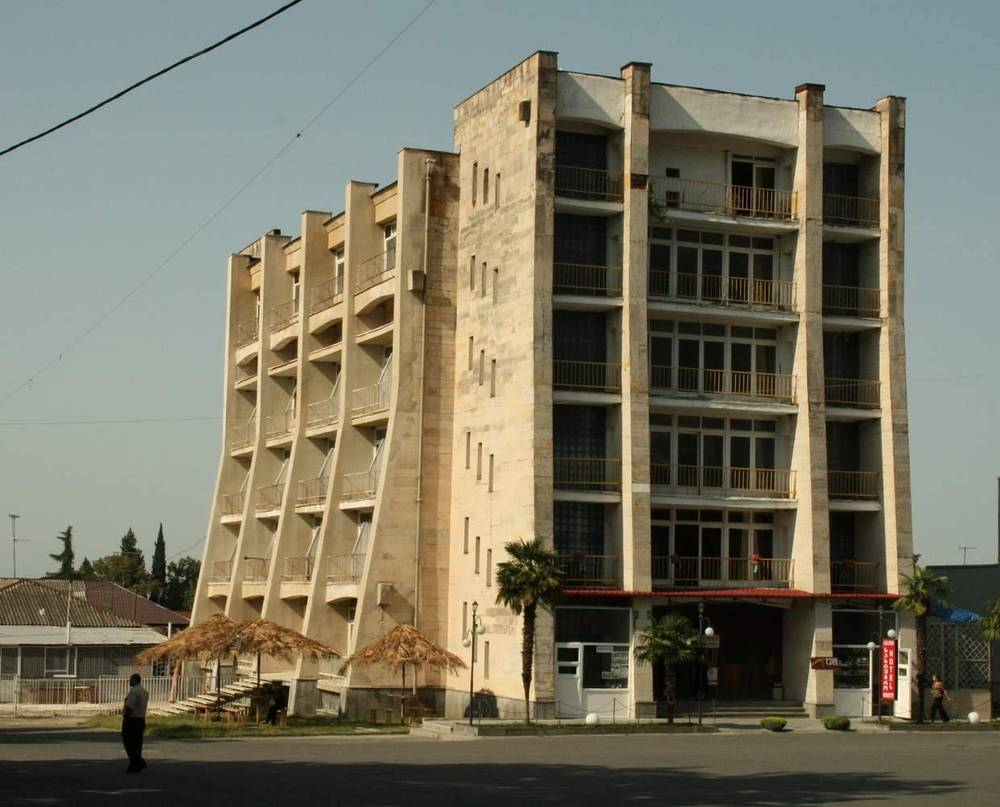
Hotel in Lagodekhi

Lagodekhi was founded in the 8th century, under the name of Lakuasti, when the Eristavi Archil I ordered to build a fortress.

In the 11th century, Lagodekhi was an important monastery in the historical region of Hereti.

In the 1610s, after the invasion of Shah Abbas, the territory of Lagodekhi was devastated.

In 1830, as a stronghold on the Lezgin cordon Line, the military settlement of Lagodekhi was founded. Until 1917 in the territory of Lagodekhi was the headquarters of the regiment. Next to the regiment itself, at the same time, the construction of a small settlement began, where most of those who ended military service remained, but for some reason did not want to return to their homeland. As a result, the support post was transformed into a civilian settlement in 1857.

From 1864 to 1897 the construction of the Orthodox Church in the name of the Protection of the Blessed Virgin Mary went on. In 1912, the Lagodekhi Nature Reserve was founded.

== See also ==
- Kakheti
- Hereti
- Lagodekhi Municipality
- Lagodekhi Nature Reserve
