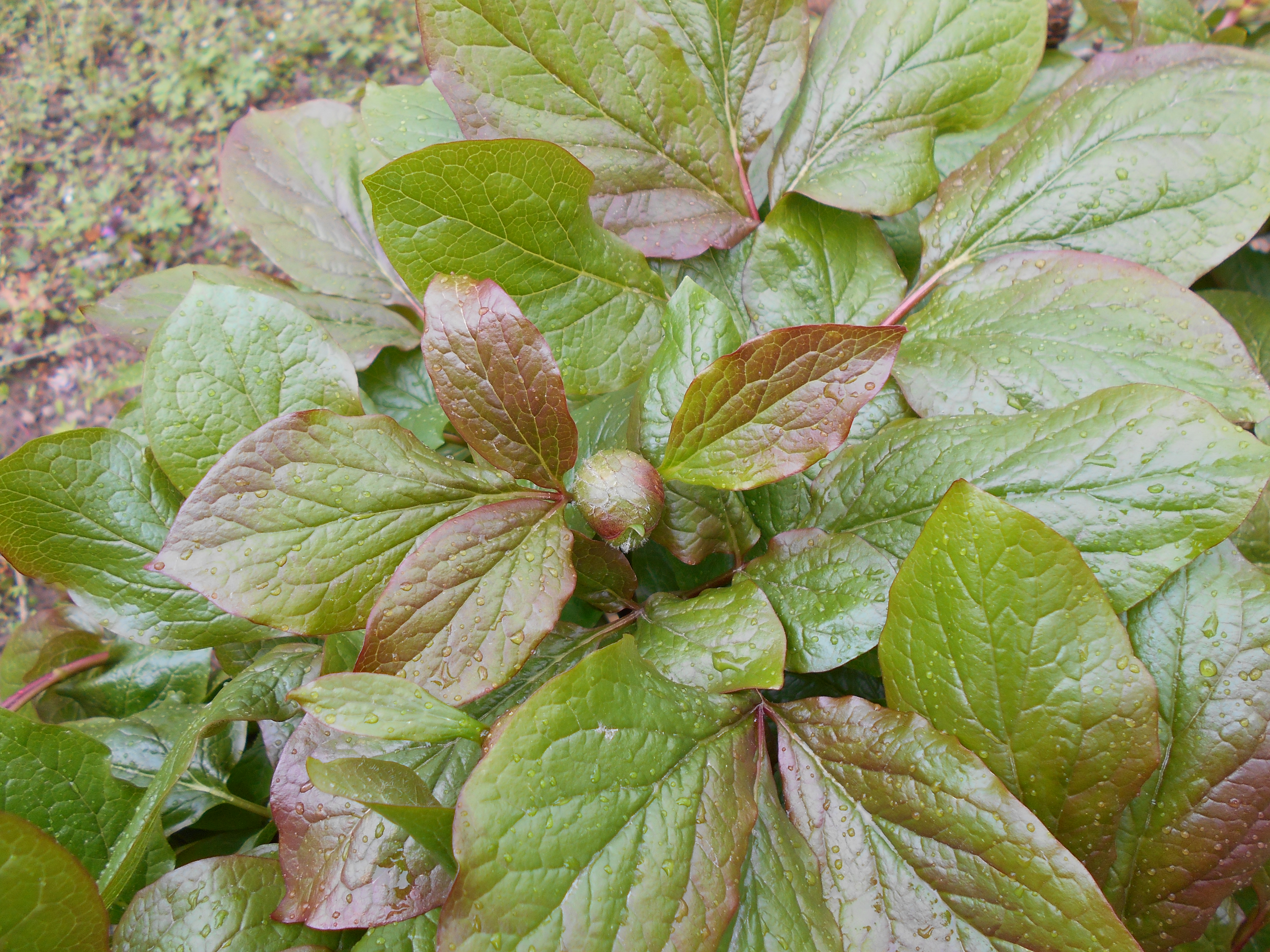

Scientific classification
- Kingdom: Plantae
- Clade: Tracheophytes
- Clade: Angiosperms
- Clade: Eudicots
- Order: Saxifragales
- Family: Paeoniaceae
- Genus: Paeonia
- Species: P. daurica
- Subspecies: P. d. subsp. macrophylla

Trinomial name
- Paeonia daurica subsp. macrophylla (Albov) D.Y.Hong

Synonyms
- Paeonia corallina var. wittmaniana f. macrophylla Albov; Paeonia macrophylla (Albov) Lomakin; Paeonia wittmaniana Steven non Lindl.; Paeonia wittmaniana Steven f. macrophylla (Albov) N.Busch; Paeonia wittmaniana Steven var. macrophylla (Albov) N.Busch ex Grossh.; Paeonia wittmaniana Hartwiss ex Lindl. var. nudicarpa Schipcz.

= Paeonia daurica subsp. macrophylla =

Subspecies of flowering plant

Paeonia daurica subsp. macrophylla is from the western Caucasus in Georgia, growing between 800 and 1000 m. It was formerly regarded as a separate species, Paeonia macrophylla, but in 2002, the Chinese botanist Hong Deyuan reduced it to a subspecies of Paeonia daurica. It grows on rocky slopes and in alpine valleys. Its leaves are a dark green and flowers are white tinged with yellow, produced in late spring or early summer.
