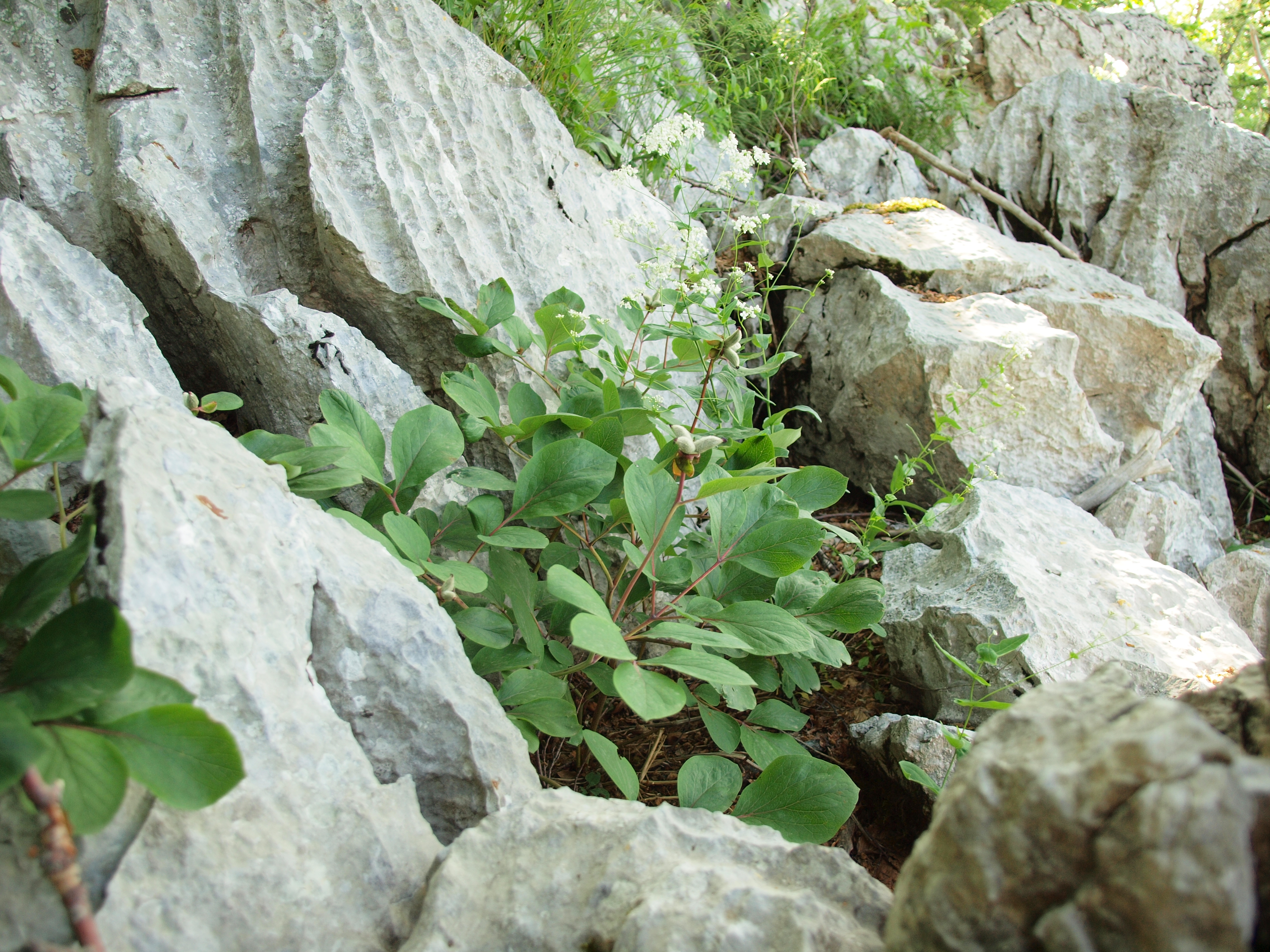
- Paeonia daurica ssp. daurica

Scientific classification
- Kingdom: Plantae
- Clade: Tracheophytes
- Clade: Angiosperms
- Clade: Eudicots
- Order: Saxifragales
- Family: Paeoniaceae
- Genus: Paeonia
- Species: P. daurica

Binomial name
- Paeonia daurica Andrews

Subspecies
- See text

Synonyms
- Paeonia corallina var. triternata Boiss. Paeonia mascula subsp. triternata (Boiss.) Stearn & P.H.Davis; Paeonia mascula var. triternata (Boiss.) Gürke

= Paeonia daurica =

Species of flowering plant

Paeonia daurica is a perennial herbaceous plant belonging to the peony family. It has slender carrot-shaped roots, leaves mostly consisting of nine leaflets, with one flower per stem. The flower is subtended by none to two leafy bracts, and has two or three sepals, five to eight petals, and many stamens. The subspecies vary in the colour of the petals (white, light yellow, pink, red), the size and shape of the leaflets, and the hairiness of the leaflets and the carpels. Paeonia daurica can be found from the Balkans to Iran, and the Crimea to Lebanon, with the centre of its distribution in the Caucasus. It is also cultivated as an ornamental.

== Description ==
Paeonia daurica is a perennial herbaceous photosynthesising plant, emerging in spring and retreating underground in the autumn. It has slender carrot-shaped roots which are directed downwards. The leaves are alternately set along the stems and have an outline of 5–11 1/2 × 8–17 cm. The lower leaves are usually composed of three sets of three entire or sometimes bifid leaflets, and occasionally there is third order division, resulting in a maximum of nineteen leaflets. The shape of the leaflets is wide to narrowly oval, with the largest width at midlength or towards the tip. The base of the leaflets is more or less wedge-shaped or sometimes rounded, the margin is entire and sometimes wavy, and the tip is rounded or has a smaller or larger sharp tip. The upper surface of the leaf is hairless, while the undersides are hairless or sparsely to densely covered in felty hairs. The hermaphrodite flowers are set individually at the end of the stems and are subtended by none to two leafy bracts. The flower itself consists of two or three green sepals, five to eight petals, that may be white, pale yellow, yellow, yellow with a red blotch at the base or with a reddish margin, pink, red, or purple-red, and many stamens consisting of pale, yellow, pink or purple filaments topped by anthers that contain yellow pollen. At the very centre of each flower are one to five carpels that are glabrous, sparsely to densely covered in felty hairs and almost directly tipped by the stigmas which are mostly curved or S-shaped from above.

=== Subspecies ===
Paeonia daurica subsp. daurica and Paeonia daurica subsp. coriifolia both have red petals and the undersides of the leaves is hairless or carries sparse felty hairs. The typical subspecies however has broad ovate leaflets with a rounded or truncated tip, while subsp. coriifolia has obovate to oblong leaflets with a rounded to pointed tip. P. daurica subsp. mlokosewitschii usually has inverted egg-shaped leaves with a rounded ends that very suddenly develop into small but sharp tips, with its undersides mostly sparsely or rather densely covered soft hairs, but sometimes hairless. P. daurica subsp. wittmanniana has leaflets that vary in hairiness. Its flowers have one to three hairless or sparsely felty carpels and yellow petals that may have a pink spot at the base. P. daurica subsp. macrophylla has larger leaflets and consistently hairless carpels. P. daurica subsp. tomentosa can be distinguished by leaflets with a mostly dense covering of felty hairs on the lower surface and on the carpels. In P. daurica subsp. velebitensis, the lower leaves consist of three sets of three leaflets each, which are inverted egg-shaped or sometimes longish oval, with a rounded tip that may end in a point, and are covered in felty hair on the underside, while the two of three ovaries are felty as well.

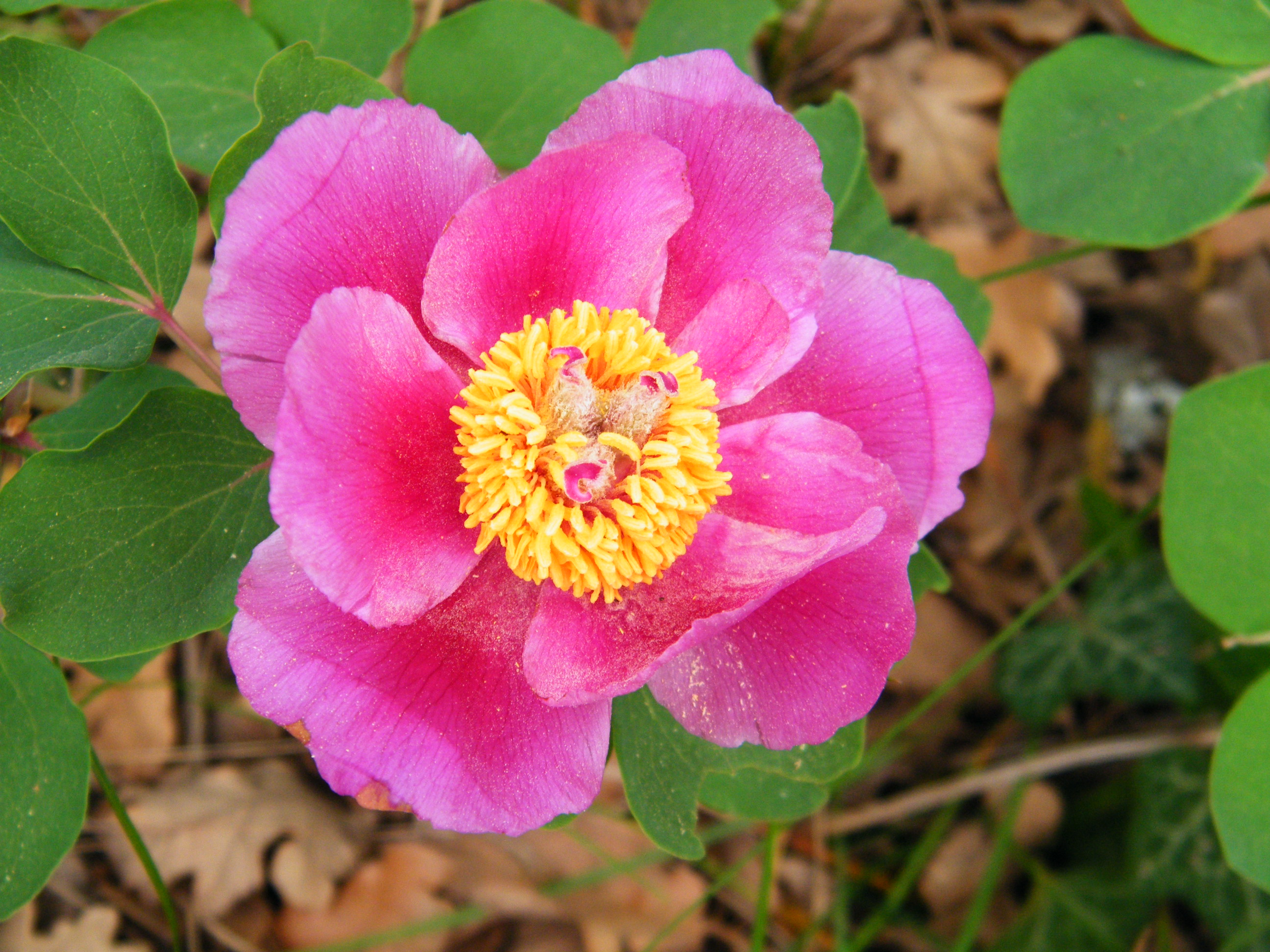
Paeonia daurica subsp. daurica,
flower

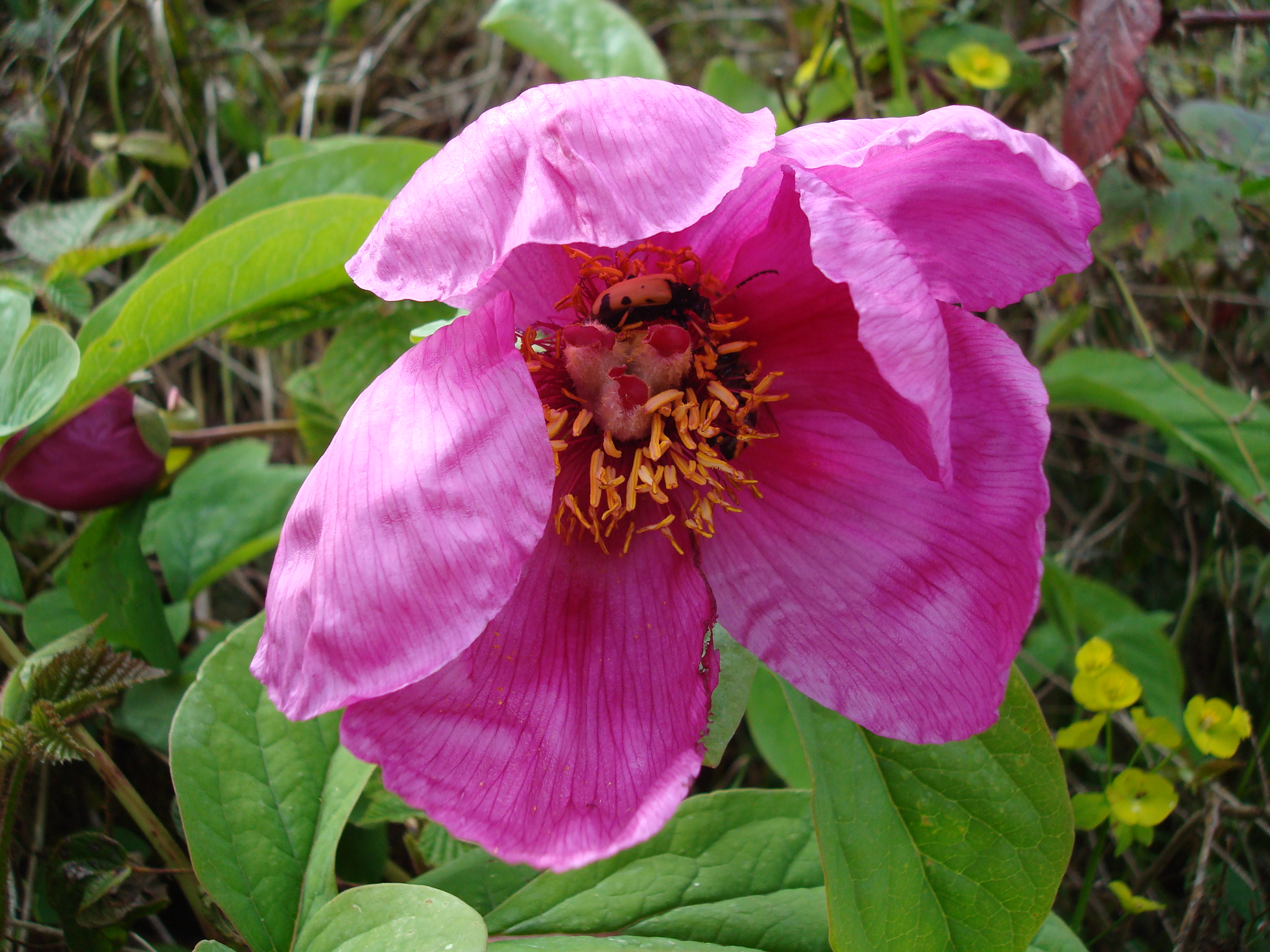
Paeonia daurica subsp. coriifolia,
flower

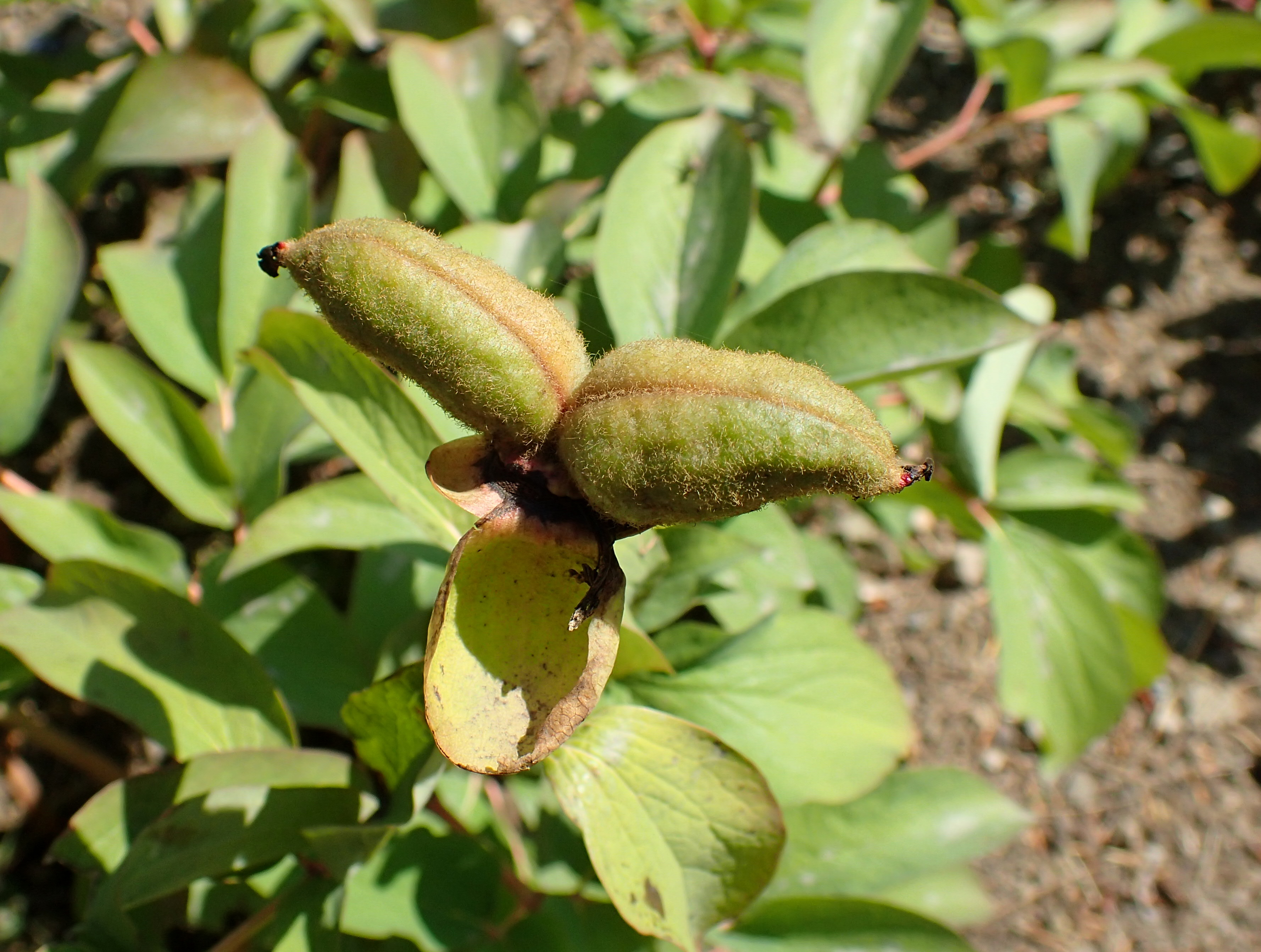
Paeonia daurica subsp. mlokosewitschii,
follicles

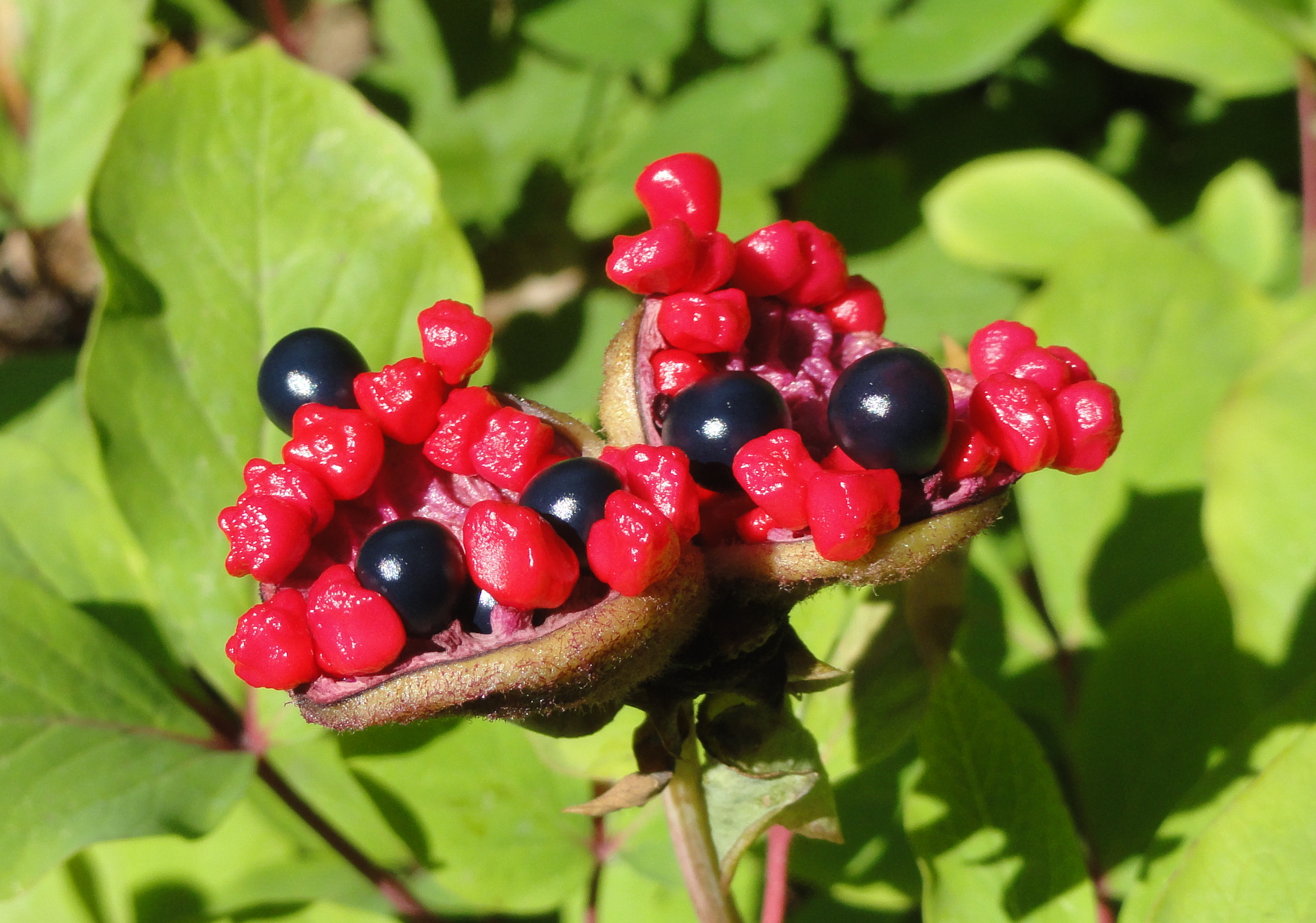
Paeonia daurica subsp. mlokosewitschii,
ripe follicles with seeds

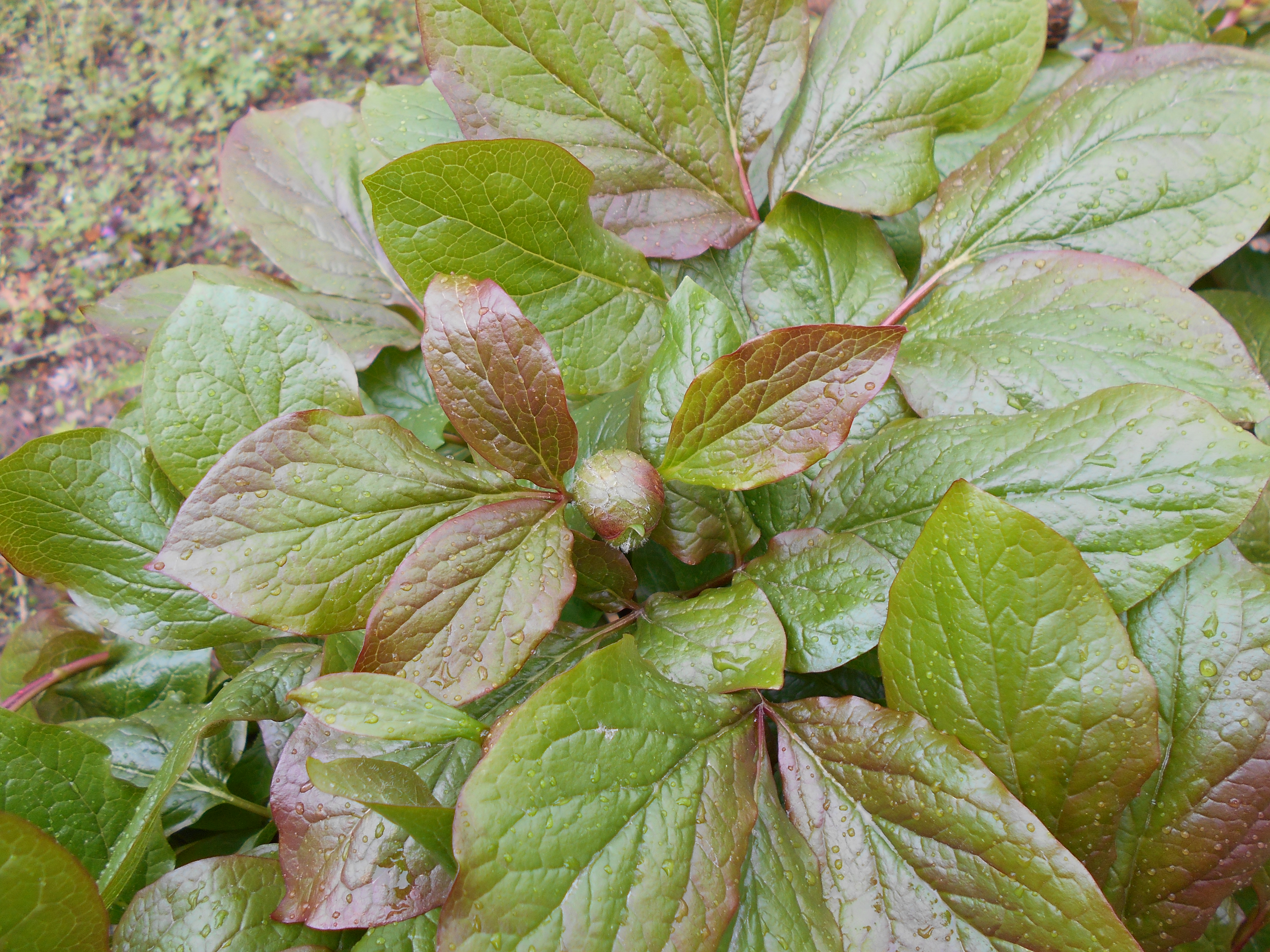
Paeonia daurica subsp. macrophylla,
leaves and bud

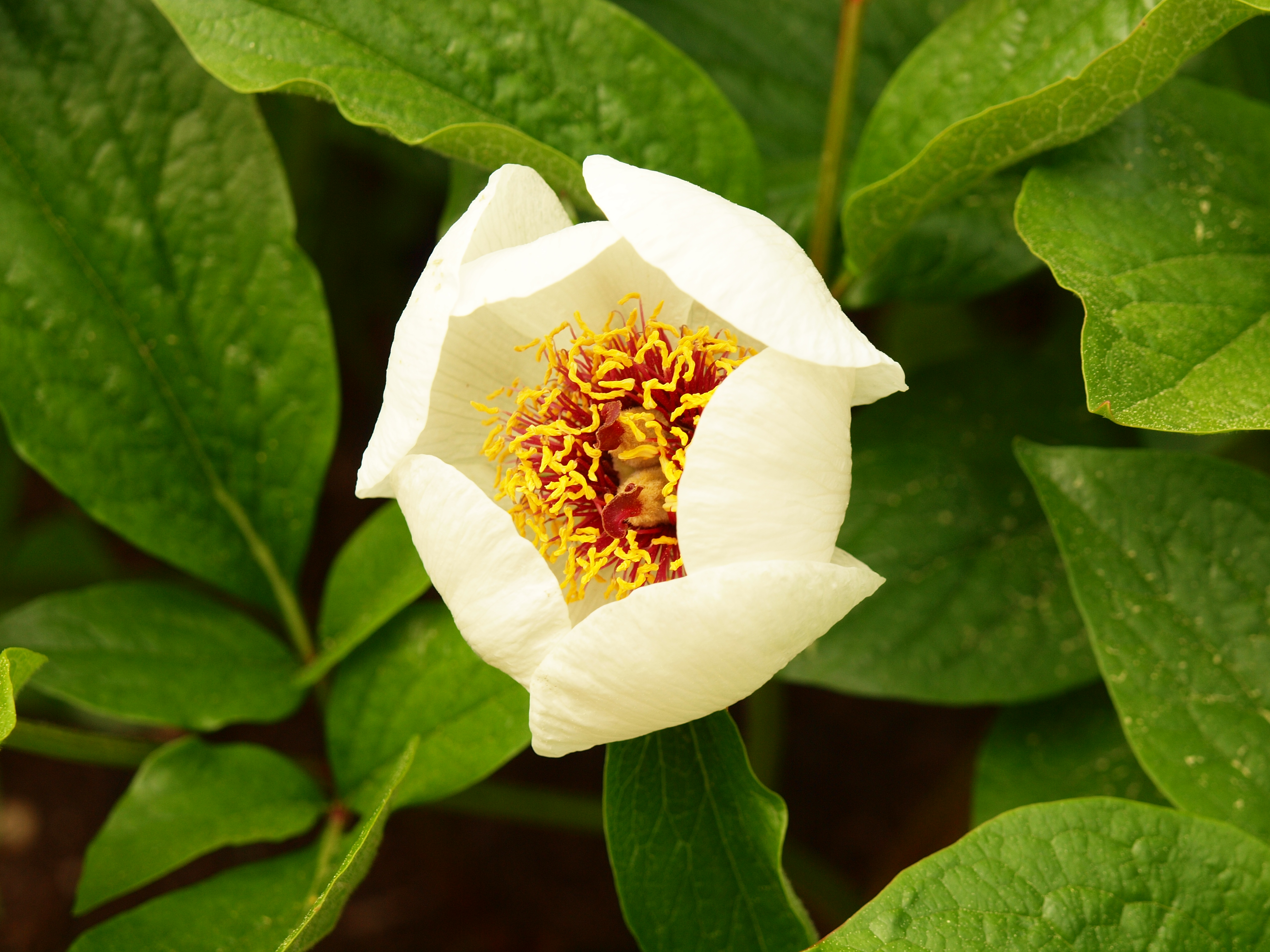
Paeonia daurica subsp. tomentosa

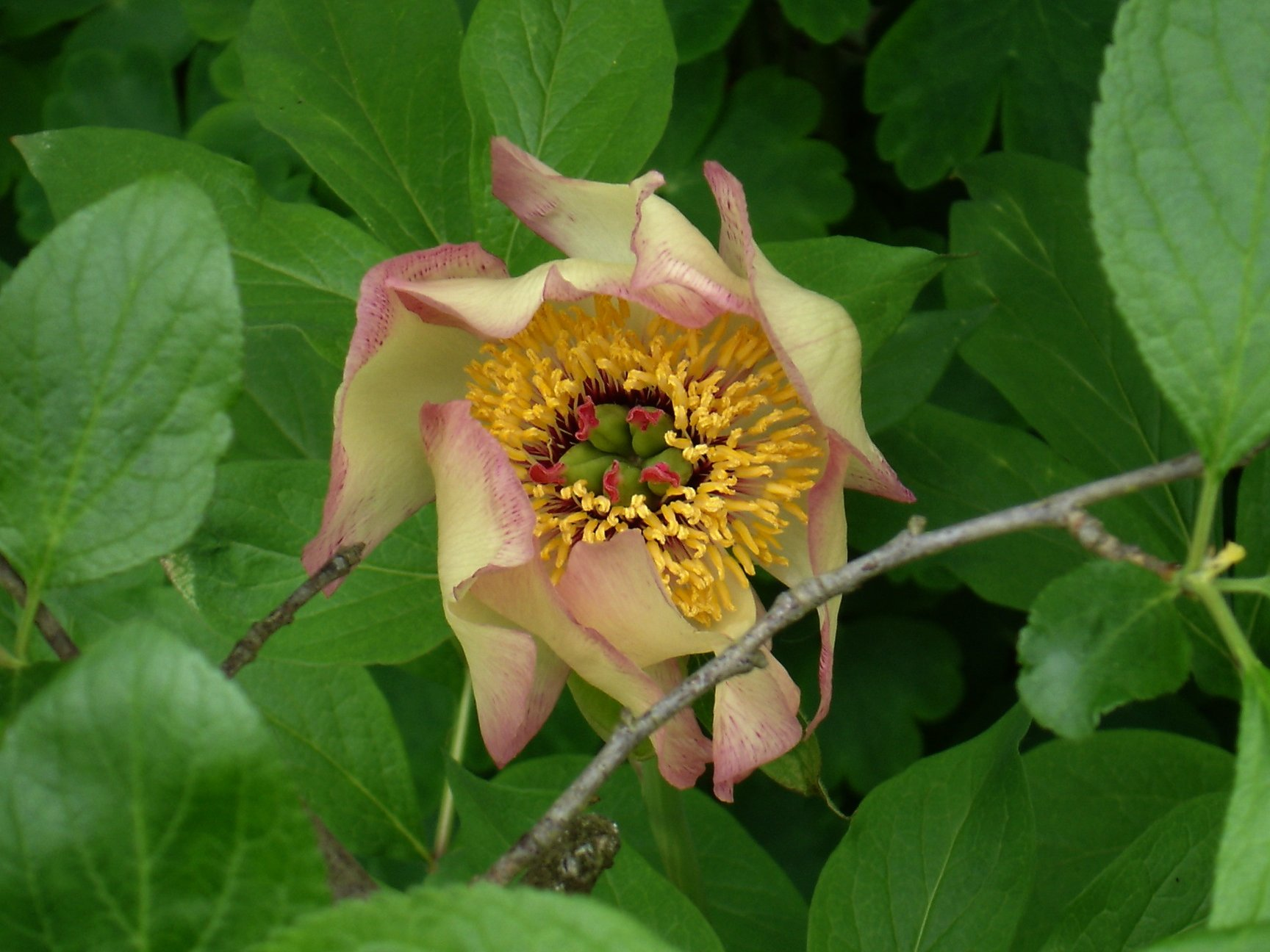
Paeonia daurica subsp. wittmanniana

== Taxonomy ==
=== Taxonomic history ===
Paeonia daurica was first described by Henry Cranke Andrews in the seventh volume of his Botanist's Repository published in 1807. A yellow flowered Paeonia species from Abkhazia was collected by C.M. Worontzoff, and described in 1846 by John Lindley, who named it P. wittmanniana Lindl.. In 1848 Christian von Steven described another taxon with yellow petals under the same specific name P. wittmanniana Steven. It had been collected at Atskhu, Meskheti Province, in Georgia. Pierre Edmond Boissier made descriptions of three taxa in this complex in 1869: P. corallina and P. corallina var. triternata, and P. wittmanniana Steven. Franz Josef Ruprecht in 1869, distinguished P. triternata f. coriifolia. In 1892 Ernst Huth distinguished between P. corallina var. typica with entire leaflets and red petals, and P. wittmanniana with lobed leaflets and yellow petals. Russian botanist Nikolai Michailowitsch Albow was the first to think that a difference only in petal colour does not merit distinguishing species, and he reduced P. wittmanniana to P. corallina var. wittmanniana, under which he described a new form, f. macrophylla. Aleksandr Aleksandrovich Lomakin recognized four species in this group in 1897: P. corallina, P. mlokosewitschii, P. macrophylla, P. wittmanniana, and introduced P. wittmanniana var. tomentosa. In 1899, Vladimir Ippolitovich Lipsky mostly supported the ideas of Lomakin, but distinguished between P. triternata and P. corallina. In 1901, Nikolai Busch recognized P. corallina subsp. triternata, its variety coriifolia (Rupr.), P. wittmanniana f. macrophylla and subsp. tomentosa, and P. mlokosewitschii. Alexander Grossheim distinguished in 1930 seven taxa that differed in the colour of the petals, the shape and number of leaflets, and the hairiness of the leaflets and fruits, so recognizing P. corallina var. caucasica and var. coriifolia, P. mlokosewitschii, P. wittmanniana and its var. macrophylla, P. tomentosa and the new P. abchasica. Nikolai Schipczinsky in the Flora of the USSR (1937) distinguished between P. mlokosewitschii – as part of the series Obovatae having orbicular, ovate or rarely pointed leaflets – and P. triternata, P. caucasica, P. wittmanniana, P. macrophylla, P. tomentosa and P. abchasica – all having rather wide, pointed leaflets – assigning them to the series Corallinae. Frederick Claude Stern in his book A study of the genus Paeonia recognized in his subsection Foliolatae the species P. daurica, P. mlokosewitschii and P. wittmanniana, the latter with four varieties. In 1950 Grossgeim revised his view from 1930 and recognized P. kavachensis (= P. caucasica), P. mlokosewitschii (including P. tomentosa) and P. wittmanniana (including P. abchasica). P. wittmanniana Steven was renamed to P. steveniana by the Georgian botanist Kemularia-Nathadze in 1961, who recognized all previous taxa except P. abchasica in addition to describing a new species named P. ruprechtiana. In 2010 D.Y. Hong revised the genus Paeonia, recognising seven subspecies in P. daurica, among which the new subsp. velebitensis.

=== Modern classification, subdivision and synonymy ===
Paeonia corallina is a synonym of Paeonia mascula, so cannot be applied to the taxa of P. daurica. According to the most recent taxonomic review of this complex of taxa, no morphological differences occur that are distinct enough to recognize separate species. There are however sufficient differences between the average character states between populations to make a distinction between seven subtaxa useful.

- Leaflets are broad ovate with a rounded to obtuse tip, hairless or sparsely villose or pilose, the petals are red, and the genome is diploid (2n=10).
  → P. daurica subsp. daurica = P. corallina var. triternatiformis
- Leaflets are obovate to oblong with a rounded to pointed tip, hairless or sparsely villose or pilose, the petals are red, and the genome is diploid (2n=10).
  → P. daurica subsp. coriifolia = P. triternata f. coriifolia, P. corallina subsp. triternata var. coriifolia, P. caucasica var. coriifolia, P. corallina var. caucasica, P. caucasica, P. ruprechtiana, P. kavachensis Grossheim auct. non Aznavour var. coriifolia, P. triternata Ruprecht auct. non Pall. ex. DC
- The leaflets are large (12–18×8–12 cm), the carpels are without hairs, and the genome is diploid (2n=10).
  → P. daurica subsp. macrophylla = P. macrophylla, P. wittmanniana Steven, P. corallina var. wittmanniana f. macrophylla, P. steveniana, P. wittmanniana var. nudicarpa
- The leaflets are usually inverted egg-shaped but with a slender pointed tip (or mucronate), the petals are white, pale yellow, yellow, or yellow but with a red or pink margin or with a red spot at the base, pink, red or purple-red, the hairiness of the leaflets and fruits is variable, and the genome is diploid (2n=10).
  → P. daurica subsp. mlokosewitschii = P. mlokosewitschii, P. lagodechiana
- The fruits and lower surface of the leaflets are nearly always covered with dense felty hairs, the petals are pale yellow, reddish at the base in some, and the genome is tetraploid (2n=20).
  → P. daurica subsp. tomentosa = P. wittmanniana Steven var. tomentosa, P. corallina var. triternata, P. mlokosewitschii Grossheim auct. non Lomakin
- The lower leaves consist of three sets of three leaflets each, with an inverted egg-shape or sometimes longish oval, with a rounded tip that may end pointy. The carpels each contain two of three ovaries and underside of the leaflets is covered in felty hair. The genome in this subspecies has not yet been analysed.
  → P. daurica subsp. velebitensis
- The leaflets are hairless or sparsely villose or pilose, there are one to three carpels that are glabrous or sparsely villose or pilose, the petals are yellow, sometimes with a pink spot at the base, and the genome is tetraploid (2n=20).
  → P. daurica subsp. wittmanniana = P. wittmanniana Lindl., P. abchasica

== Distribution ==
Paeonia daurica can be found scattered in the Balkans (Romania, Bulgaria, Serbia, Croatia, Bosnia, Montenegro, Albania, Macedonia, northern Greece), the Crimea, the Caucasus (Dagestan and Krasnodar Krai in Russia, Georgia, Azerbaijan), Kaçkar Mountains (Turkey), the Alborz Mountains (northern Iran), Talysh Mountains (west of Guilan province, South of Caspian sea), and in Lebanon. The typical P. daurica subsp. daurica is widespread, but is not sympatric with the other subspecies, and does not occur in the Velebit, Caucasus and Alborz mountains. P. daurica subsp. coriifolia occurs at elevations below 1000 m in the west and north-west of the Caucasus and it is found in deciduous forests dominated by oak, beech, elm, maple and ash or in mixed forests of fir, oak and beech, growing on a wide range of limestone, sandstone and volcanic rocks. P. daurica subsp. mlokosewitschii is only known from eastern Georgia, north-western Azerbaijan and adjacent Russia, where it grows in deciduous oak, beech, elm, maple and chestnut forests. P. daurica subsp. wittmanniana is found in north-western Georgia and the upper reaches of the Mzymta River in adjacent Russia where it grows in both deciduous forests and subalpine and alpine meadows between 1000 and 2300 m, only on limestone. P. daurica subsp. macrophylla is confined to the mountains of south-western Georgia and north-eastern Turkey from 1200 to 2200 m, although it has been found as low as 800 m. It can be found in deciduous or mixed forests and in glades, but there seems to be no preference for any soil type. P. daurica subsp. tomentosa occurs in the Talysch and Alborz Mountains in south-eastern Azerbaijan and northern Iran where it occurs in deciduous forests and pastures on poor soils derived from sandstone at altitudes between 1100 and 1800 m. P. daurica subsp. velebitensis only grows at elevations between 900 and 1200 m in the Velebit Mountains (Dinaric Alps) of Croatia.

== Ecology ==
With its hairless leaves, P. daurica, does not seem to be adapted to a typical Mediterranean climate, but to rather more humid circumstances in summer. The population on Mount Orjen grows in forest consisting of silver fir, European beech, Turkish hazel, the maple species Acer pseudoplatanus and A. intermedium, and ash, and is further accompanied by widespread species such as European spindle, mountain cherry, drooping bittercress, Turk's cap lily, but also with endemics such as the Orjen iris.

== Cultivation ==
Several subspecies of P. daurica are on offer as seed or plants (daurica, coriifolia, tomentosa, macrophylla, mlokosewitschii and wittmanniana) and are collected by specialist gardeners. These are said to be hardy in western Europe and suitable for normal garden conditions, the lowland taxa with preference for more or less shady circumstances.

Paeonia daurica subsp. mlokosewitschii has won the Royal Horticultural Society's Award of Garden Merit. As this subspecies' name is somewhat difficult to pronounce in English, it is often affectionately referred to as 'Molly-the-Witch'.

P. daurica is a red book species (VU) in Ukraine and is cultivated in the Crimean reservations of Yalta, Karadag and Cape Martyan. In the Crimean Tatar language it's called patlaq çanaq, meaning 'broken cup', referring to the shape of the petals that remind an elegant cup that was broken with the pieces still held in place.
