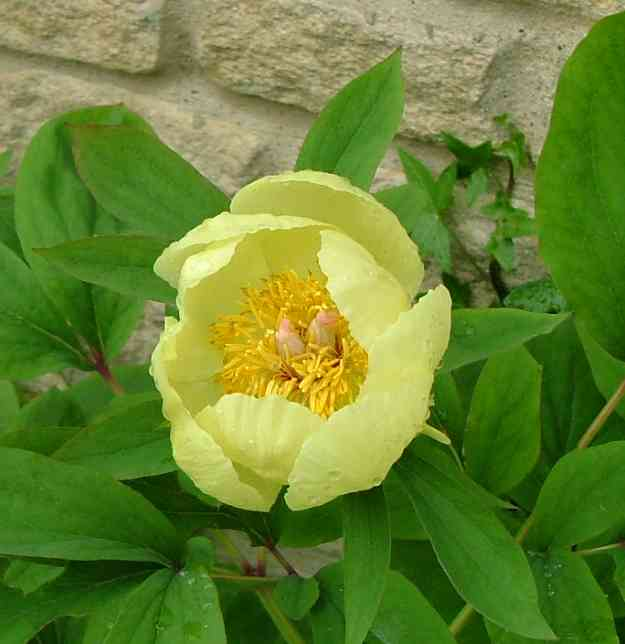

Scientific classification
- Kingdom: Plantae
- Clade: Tracheophytes
- Clade: Angiosperms
- Clade: Eudicots
- Order: Saxifragales
- Family: Paeoniaceae
- Genus: Paeonia
- Species: P. daurica
- Subspecies: P. d. subsp. mlokosewitschii

Trinomial name
- Paeonia daurica subsp. mlokosewitschii (Lomakin) D.Y.Hong

Synonyms
- Paeonia lagodechiana Kem.-Nath.; Paeonia mlokosewitschii Lomakin; Paeonia triternata var. mlokosewitschii (Lomakin) Stebbins

= Paeonia daurica subsp. mlokosewitschii =

Subspecies of flowering plant

Paeonia daurica subsp. mlokosewitschii, the golden peony or Caucasian peony, is a species of flowering plant native to the Caucasus Mountains in Azerbaijan, Georgia, and Dagestan, where it grows on rocky slopes in oak, hornbeam, or beech forests. The plant is sometimes nicknamed Molly the witch, a humorous mispronunciation of the species name, which most people find difficult to pronounce. It was formerly regarded as a separate species, Paeonia mlokosewitschii, but in 2002, the Chinese botanist Hong Deyuan reduced it to a subspecies of Paeonia daurica.

== Description ==
It is a herbaceous perennial plant growing 23–27 in (58–69 cm) tall, with biternate, glaucous leaves with obovate lobes. In spring it bears large, single, bowl-shaped lemon-yellow flowers 5 in (13 cm) in diameter, the ovary pubescent, the two to four carpels white, pink or yellow, and the stamen filaments yellow-green. In cultivation in the UK it has been given the Royal Horticultural Society's Award of Garden Merit.

== Taxonomy ==
Paeonia daurica subsp. mlokosewitschii was first described as a species, Paeonia mlokosewitchii, by Aleksandr Lomakin in 1897. It was named after the Polish botanist Ludwik Młokosiewicz who first discovered it. In 2002, the Chinese botanist Hong Deyuan reduced it to a subspecies of Paeonia daurica.
