= Signagi Municipality =

Coordinates: 41°36′55″N 45°54′46″E

Signagi Municipality სიღნაღის მუნიციპალიტეტი
- Municipality
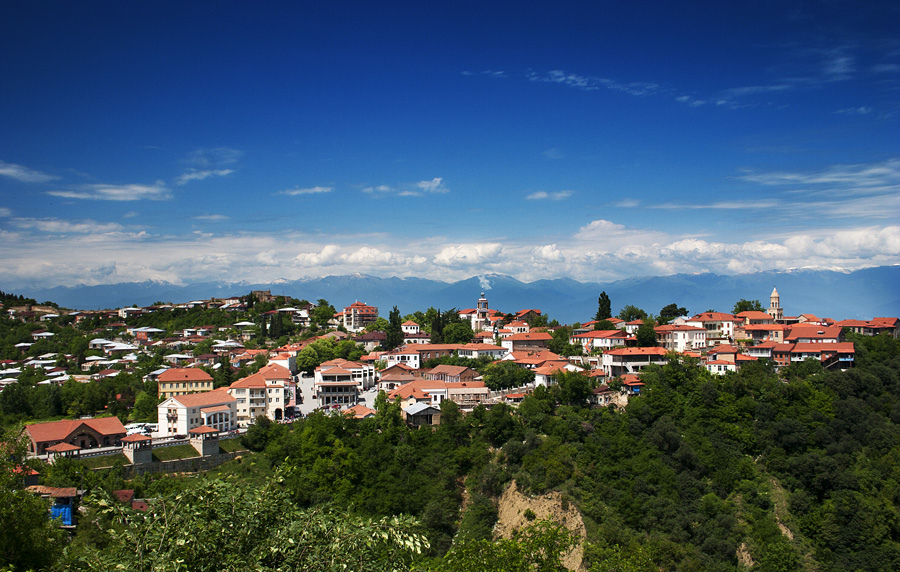
- Town of Sighnaghi

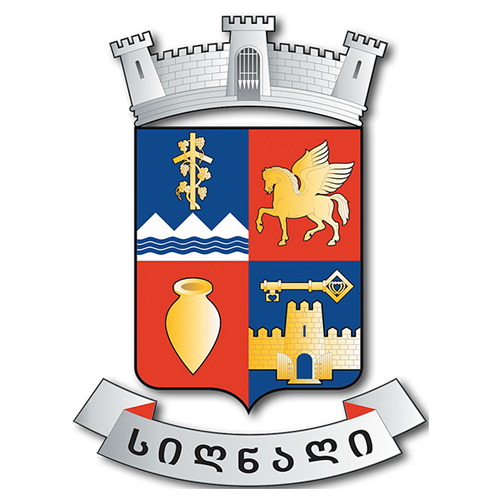
- Flag Seal
- Interactive map of Signagi Municipality
- Country: Georgia
- Mkhare: Kakheti
- capital city: Signagi

Government
  - mayor: Malkhaz Begiashvili

Area
  - Total: 1,252 km^{2} (483 sq mi)

Population (2014)
  - Total: 29,948
  - Density: 23.93/km^{2} (62.0/sq mi)

Population by ethnicity
  - Georgians: 97.44%
  - Armenians: 0.73%
  - Russians: 0.70%
  - Yazidis: 0.34%
  - Azerbaijanis: 0.33%
- Time zone: UTC+4 (Georgian Standard Time)
- Website: http://www.signagi.gov.ge/en

Sighnaghi (Georgian: სიღნაღის მუნიციპალიტეტი) is an administrative-territorial unit in eastern Georgia, Kakheti region. The municipality borders the municipalities of Gurjaani and Sagarejo to the northwest and west, the municipality of Dedoplistskaro to the southeast and the municipality of Lagodekhi and the Republic of Azerbaijan to the north and northeast. The area is 1251.7 km^{2}. Agricultural fields occupy 93,375 ha, and forest resources amount to 5,500 ha.

== History ==
Until 1917 Sighnaghi municipality was called Sighnaghi Mazra; from 1928, the municipality was part of Kakheti Mazra, and from 1929 it was included in Kakheti District. Since 1930, it has been formed as a separate district. On 9 July 1938, according to the resolution of the Supreme Council of the Georgian SSR, the Sighnaghi district was separated from Tsiteltskaro district, and the remaining district was divided into the following rural councils: Sighnaghi (district centre), Anaga, Vakiri, Sakobo, Bodbis-Khevi, Kvemo-Machkhaani, Jugaani, Tibaani, Nukriani, Magharo, Bodbe and Ulyanovka. From 1963 to 1964, Tsiteltskaro district again joined to Sighnaghi district, and from 1965 it was again separated as a separate unit of Dedoplistskaro district.

Based on then-president Mikheil Saakashvili's Order No. 2304 of 16 December 2005, the districts of Georgia were reorganized, resulting from which the existing districts were changed into municipalities. LEPL Sighnaghi Municipality was registered as a payer (ID 240417223) is 21 December 2006, and the date of registration was 18 June 2007.

Sighnaghi is a municipality located in the Kakheti region. It is determined by archeological excavations that this area played an important role since the Paleolithic, Neolithic and Bronze Ages. The territory of Sighnaghi district was formerly known as Kambechovani, and later it was called Kiziki. After the recognition of Christianity as the state religion in Georgia, this side acquired great importance. St. Nino was executed and buried here. Sighnaghi is a word of Turkish origin and means shelter.

== Administrative divisions and sattlements ==
Municipality of Sighnaghi is a unification of settlements with administrative borders and an administrative centre – the city of Sighnaghi. Sighnaghi municipality has an elected representative body (council) and an executive body (town hall). The municipality has a registered population and its own property, budget, and income. The municipality is a legal entity under public law. The municipality council and mayor of Sighnaghi municipality are elected for four years. The last elections were held in 2021.

=== Settlements ===
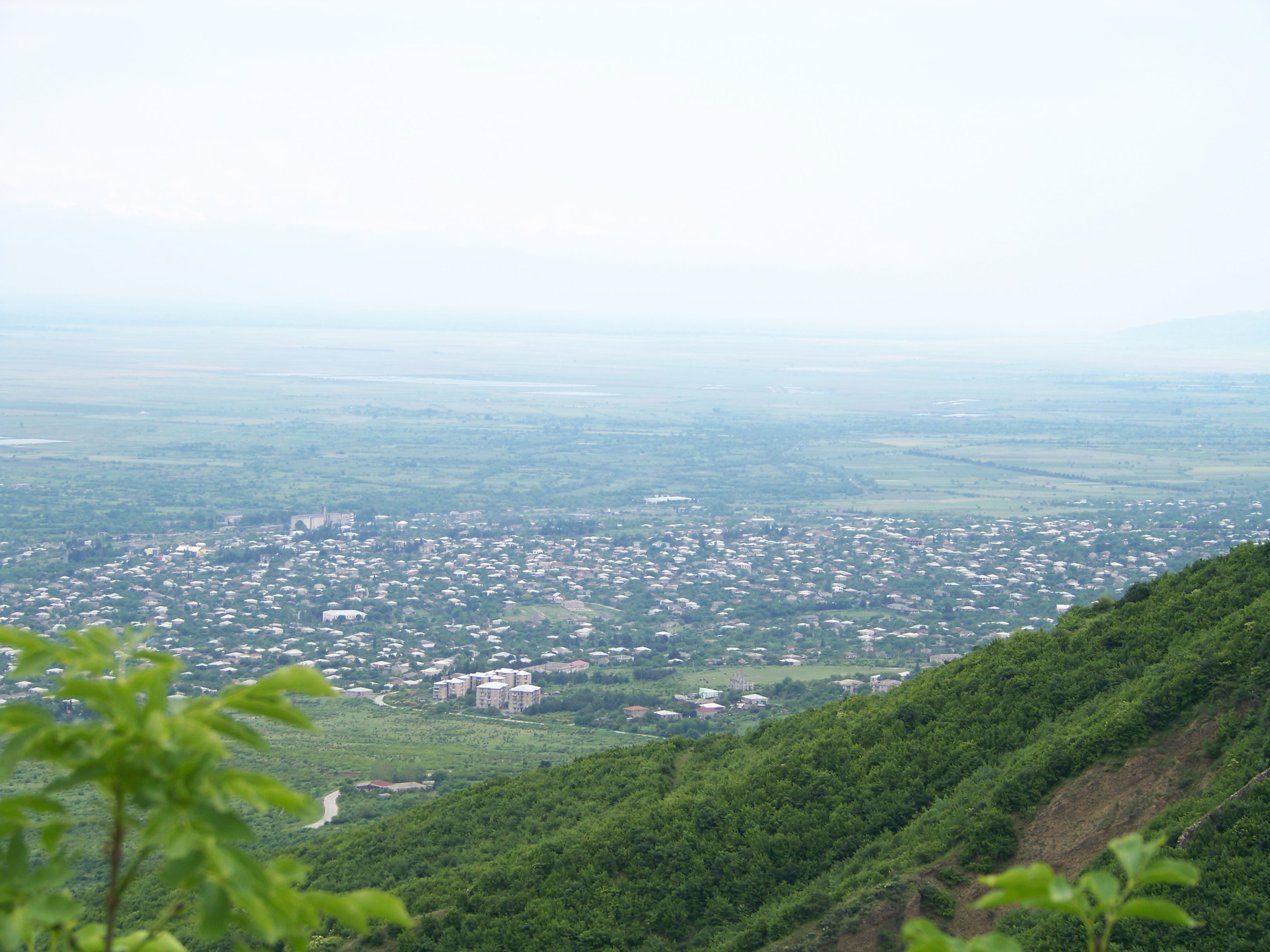
Town of Tsnori

The municipality is divided into the independent cities of Sighnaghi and Tsnori as well as 12 municipalities (Georgian temi, თემი or simply "village", Georgian sopeli, სოფელი):

- Vaqiri
- Bodbe
- Sakobo
- Kvemo Machkhani
- Jugaani
- Anaga
- Bodbiskhevi
- Iliatsminda
- Magharo
- Nukriani
- Tibaani
- Old Anaga

== Geography and climate ==
Sighnaghi Municipality is located in Eastern Georgia, in the Kakheti region. Its administrative center is the city of Sighnaghi. The municipality is bordered by Gurjaani Municipality and Sagarejo Municipality municipalities to the northwest and west, Dedoplistskaro Municipality to the southeast, Lagodekhi Municipality to the north and northeast, and the Republic of Azerbaijan. A large part of Sighnaghi municipality is occupied by the Iori Plateau. A small part of Gombori ridge also enters its territory. The highest mountain in the Gombori ridge within the municipality is Choporti (1087 m).

Sighnaghi lacks a hydrographic network. There are mostly periodic rivers here. We must distinguish two rivers, the Alazani and the Iori. Thorn bushes are spread on Iori highland. In the southern part of the Iori Plateau, we find the bush saltwort, from which soda is extracted. There are floodplain forests along the banks of the river Iori: Tsnori, floodplain poplar, Ialghuni, etc. Oak and hornbeam are noteworthy in the forests of Gombori ridge. There are several types of climate in the territory of Sighnaghi municipality. The Iori plateau has a moderately humid steppe climate, with hot summers and cold winters. The Alazani plain has a moderately humid climate, where the winters are moderately cold and the summers are hot. The Gombori ridge has a moderately humid and moderately warm climate with cold winters and long warm summers. The average annual air temperature ranges from 11.1 °C to 12.6 °C.

== Politics ==
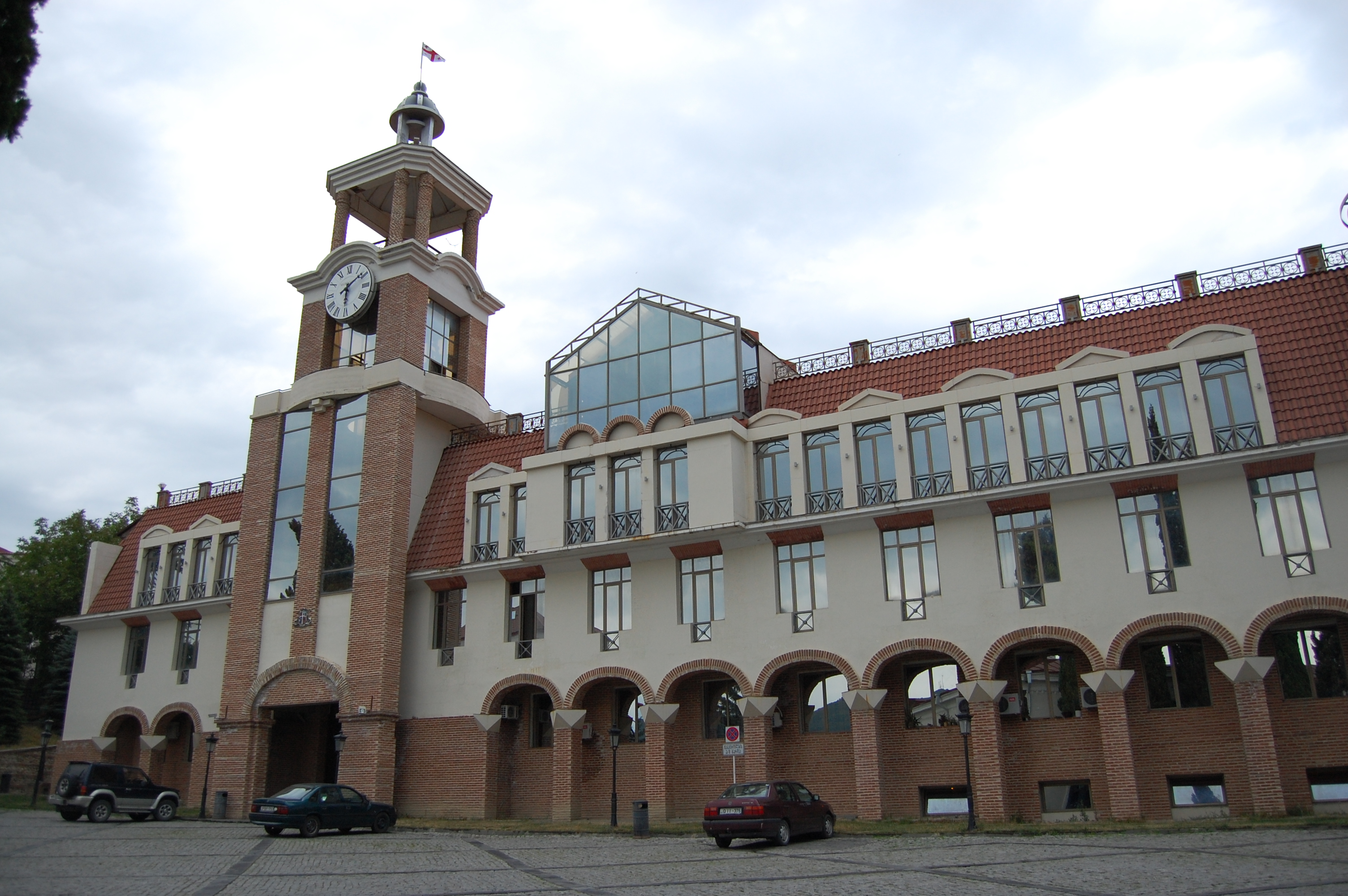
Sighnaghi Town hall

Sighnaghi Municipal Assembly (Georgian: სიღნაღის საკრებულო) is a representative body in Sighnaghi Municipality. currently consisting of 36 members. The council is assembled into session regularly, to consider subject matters such as code changes, utilities, taxes, city budget, oversight of city government and more. Sighnaghi sakrebulo is elected every four years. The last election was held in October 2021.

Party	2017	2021	Current Municipal Assembly
Georgian Dream	23	26	
United National Movement	4	7	
Ahali		2 (Note: Split from UNM.)	
For Georgia		1	
Alliance of Patriots	1		
European Georgia	1		
Total	29	36	

== Education ==
Twenty public schools are operating in the territory of Sighnaghi municipality, and one of the mentioned schools is located in the territory of Sighnaghi city. 3 non-state (private) educational institutions operate in the territory of the municipality. Among them – 2 are located in the city of Sighnaghi: "Intellecti" LLC and "Etaloni 2015" LLC. Third – "Progressi 010" LLC is located in the village of Sakobo.

There are also 24 preschools (kindergartens) educational institutions operating in the territory of Sighnaghi municipality.

== Culture ==
There is a theatre operating in the city of Sighnaghi; its history dates back to 1872.

NNLE Culture and Art centre has been created in the municipality, where 13 municipal culture centres are united.

Twenty libraries operate in the municipality, including children's libraries.

A historical-ethnographic museum functions in the city of Sighnaghi.

The house museum of Vano Sarajishvili operates in Sighnaghi city.

One can visit the memorial museum of the self-taught artist and composer Sandro Mirianashvili in the city of Sighnaghi. The museum was opened in 1998.

The museum of Sandro Akhmeteli, one of the founders of modern Georgian theatre, is operating in the village of Anaga. The director's memorial items, existing ethnographic material, and works of fine art are preserved in the museum.

The house museum of the Georgian writer Irodion Evdoshvili operates in the village of Bodbishkhevi. Memorial items of the writer and existing ethnographic material are preserved in the museum, including paintings, photographs and documentary material, and collections from different periods.

The house-museum of the national hero of Italy Pore Mosulishvili, is open for visitors in the village of Kvemo Machkhaani. One can see Pore Mosulishvili's memorial items, medals, orders, albums, ethnographic items, photos, documents and others in the museum.

The house museum of the Georgian writer and dramatist Sandro Shanshiashvili operates in the village of Jugaani. The museum preserves his personal belongings, historical and ethnographic material, including a piano donated by Zakaria Paliashvili, and material depicting the poet's life and work.

The memorial museum of the famous Georgian actor Vaso Godziashvili is inviting visitors to the village of Vakiri. Vaso Godziashvili's memorial items, historical and ethnographic material, works of fine art, documentary and photo material, costumes for plays, books about the actor's life and work, theatrical sketches, and models are preserved in the museum.

The house museum of the famous Georgian scientist, professor, surgeon and urologist Alexander Gzirishvili operates in the village of Vakiri. His personal belongings, ethnographic material, photographs and documentary material depicting the scientist's life and work are preserved in the museum.

There is the memorial museum of the Georgian writer, poet and dramatist Ilo Mosashvili in the village of Vakiri. The museum preserves Ilo Mosashvili's memorial items, historical and ethnographic material, and photo and documentary material depicting the life and work of the writer.

=== Festivals and public holidays ===
Event	Date	Description
"Vanooba"	May	A public holiday – Vanoaba – is held in Sighnaghi every year in the month of May. The holiday is dedicated to the Georgian musician, one of the founders of Georgian professional vocal art, Vano Sarajishvili.
"Solomonoba"	–	In Magharo village of Sighnaghi municipality, a public holiday – Solomon's Day is celebrated every year. The holiday is dedicated to the Georgian scientist and public figure, the founder of the Georgian Scientific School of Logic, the editor of the weekly supplement of the first Georgian newspaper "Tbilisis Utskebani", Solomon Dodashvili. The holiday is held in Solomon Dodashvili's native village. The public holiday was forgotten for many years, in 2008 it was restored by Chokhosan knights of Kakutsa Cholokashvili's troupe.
"Ninooba"	–	Twice a year, in the village of Bodbe, the feast of St. Nino, the preacher of Christianity in Georgia, is celebrated.
Sighnaghi Art-festival	–	Sighnaghi Art Festival was founded in 2022. The purpose of the event is to create a creative space for artists and sculptors to promote and support the development of these branches of fine arts.
Summer Night Jazz Festival	–	Every year, a jazz festival is held in the open air in Sighnaghi. The festival hosts Georgian and world-renowned musicians. The festival was founded in 2021.
Youth days of Sighnaghi	–	The festival "Youth Days" is held every year in Sighnaghi. Sports competitions, intellectual games and concerts are held within the festival. The festival was founded in 2016.
"Sighnaghkalaqoba" (The day of Sighnaghi)	–	The traditional public holiday has been held in the city of Sighnaghi since 2007. Within the framework of the holiday, concerts, exhibitions of works of folk crafts masters, fairs of local entrepreneurs' products, tasting of wine and traditional dishes are presented.
Bidzina Kvernadze Sighnaghi international festival-competition	–	An international festival-competition named after Bidzina Kvernadze is held in Sighnaghi every year. The festival was founded in 2021 and its purpose is to discover, promote and, in the future, showcase young composers. The festival hosts leading musicians-performers and composers for a week.

== Sport ==
There are 22 sports sections operating in Sighnaghi municipality: football, wrestling-judo, Georgian wrestling, Greco-Roman wrestling, power triathlon, boxing, kickboxing, basketball, rugby, chess. There are 4 sports sections in the city of Sighnaghi: football, chess, boxing, power triathlon, and 18 sections operate in the territory of the rest of municipality.

== Economy ==
The main part of the population is employed in agriculture. Viticulture, animal husbandry, poultry farming, etc. are developed in the municipality.

There are several wineries. Agricultural fields occupy 90 thousand ha, of which 40 thousand ha are arable and 50 thousand ha are pastures

== Tourism and historical sites ==
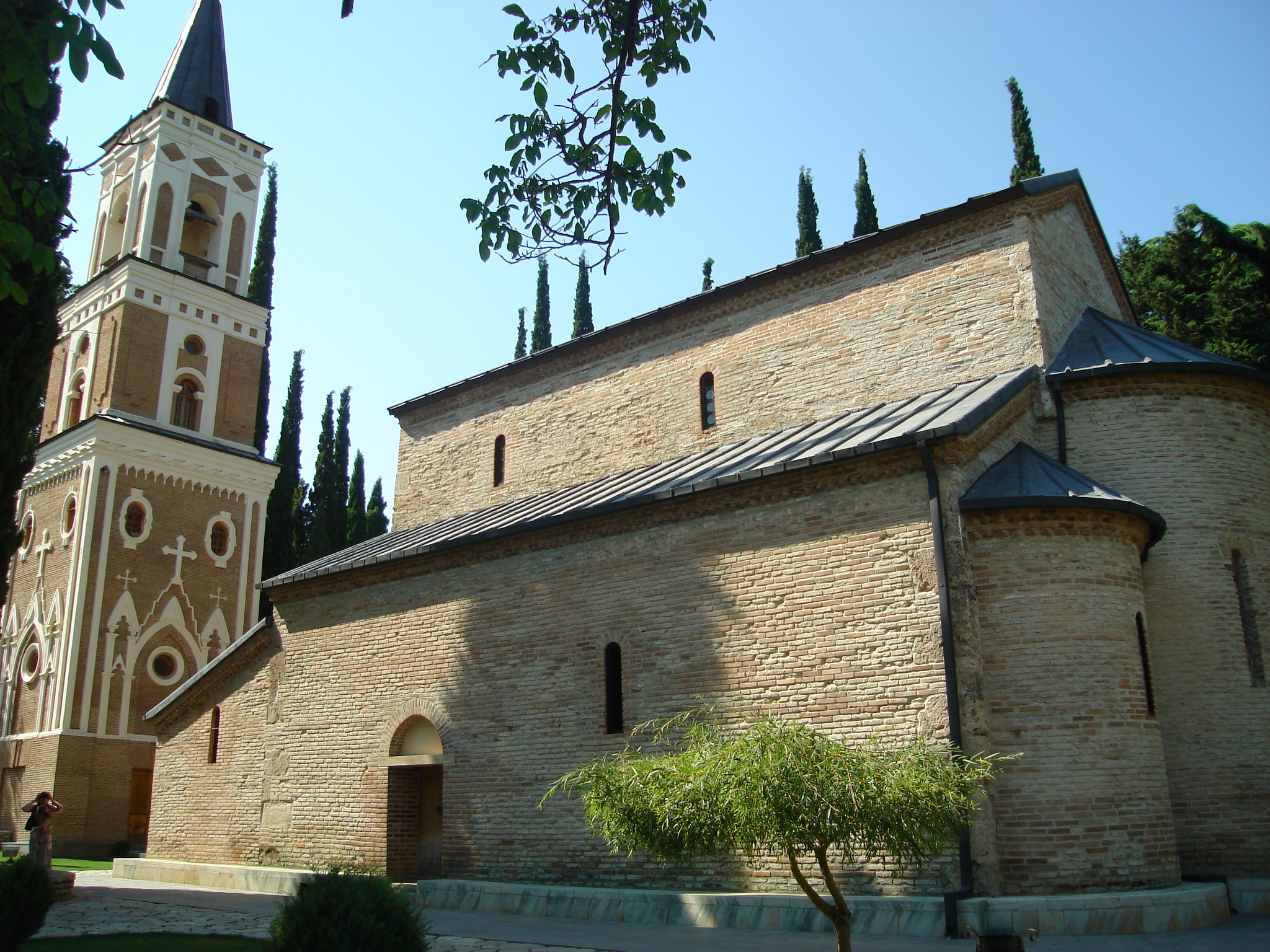
Bodbe Monastery near Signagi where the remains of St. Nino are enshrined.

=== Nature ===
- Iori Managed Reserve
- Kilakupra mud volcanoes

=== Cultural monuments ===
- Bodbe Monastery
- Khirsa monastery
- Sabereebi
- Church of St. John the Baptist in Vaqiri

== Notable people ==
Prominent people of Sighnaghi municipality
Photo	name and surname	years	Description
	Solomon Dodashvili	1805–1836	Georgian scientist and public figure
	Irodion Evdoshvili	1873–1916	Georgian writer
	Vano Sarajishvili	1879–1924	Georgian musician, one of the founders of Georgian professional vocal art
	Sandro Akhmeteli	1886–1937	Georgian director, one of the founders of modern Georgian theater
	Sandro Shanshiashvili	1888–1979	Georgian writer, playwright
	Alexandre Gzirishvili	1902–1972	Georgian scientist, surgeon, urologist, professor
	Sandro Mirianashvili	1915–1987	Georgian artist and composer
	Pore Mosulishvili	1916–1944	Italian national hero
	Hamlet Gonashvili	1928–1985	Georgian singer
	Bidzina Kvernadze	1928–2010	Georgian composer
	Tamaz Chiladze	1931–2018	Georgian writer, poet and playwright
	Otar Chiladze	1933–2009	Georgian writer, prose writer, poet and playwright
	Shota Bezhashvili	1956-	Honored master of sports, multiple champion of Georgia, 7-time champion of the Soviet Union, two-time world champion in triathlon
	Tsotne Bezhashvili	1985-	Georgian weightlifter, European champion
	Jimmy Nandoshvili	1998-	Georgian athlete, world champion

== Twin towns – sister Municipalities ==
- Khadrak (Spain)
- Malbork (Poland)
- Chateauneuf (France)
- Greiz (Germany)
- Ortahisar (Turkey)

== See also ==
- List of municipalities in Georgia (country)
