= Armoured Train 14-69 =

Armoured Train 14–69
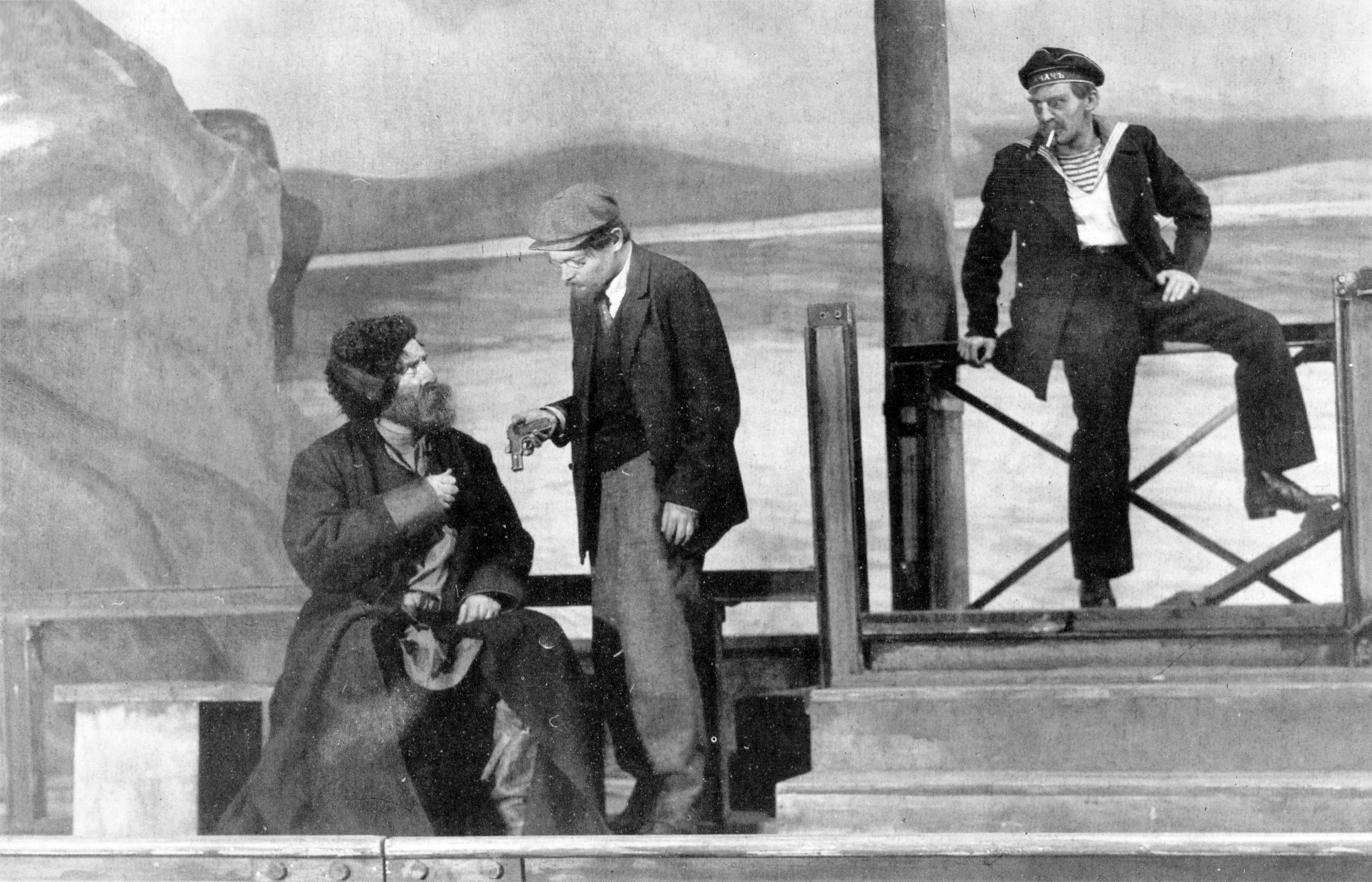
- Photograph of Khmelev (centre) from the 1927 Moscow production.
- Written by: Vsevolod Ivanov
- Original language: Russian
- Genre: Socialist realism

Premiere
- Date premiered: 8 November 1927
- Place premiered: Moscow Art Theatre

Armoured Train 14–69 (Russian: Бронепоезд 14–69, romanized: Bronepoezd 14–69) is a 1927 Soviet play by Vsevolod Ivanov. Based on his 1922 novel of the same name, it was the first play that he wrote and remains his most important. In creating his adaptation, Ivanov transformed the passive protagonist of his novel into an active exponent of proletarian ideals; the play charts his journey from political indifference to Bolshevik heroism. Set in Eastern Siberia during the Civil War, it dramatises the capture of ammunition from a counter-revolutionary armoured train by a group of partisans led by a peasant farmer, Nikolai Vershinin. It is a four-act play in eight scenes that features almost 50 characters; crowd scenes form a prominent part of its episodic dramatic structure. Near the end of the play a Chinese revolutionary, Hsing Ping-wu, lies down on the railway tracks to force the armoured train to stop.

== Characters ==
- Nikolai Vershinin, a peasant
- Peklevanov, Bolshevik party organiser
- Hsing Ping-wu, Chinese revolutionary
- Vaska Okorok
- Nezelasov, White commander of the armoured train
- Nadezhda Lvovna, a refugee White Guard

== Production history ==
Armoured Train 14–69 was first performed by the world-famous Moscow Art Theatre (MAT) in a production that opened with a gala performance on 8 November 1927. It was commissioned to celebrate the 10th anniversary of the October Revolution. The production was directed by Constantin Stanislavski, Ilya Sudakov and Nina Litovtseva (of 76 rehearsal sessions, Stanislavski directed 11, though the staging as performed was principally his). The lead role of Vershinin was played by Vasili Kachalov (in his first role as a peasant), while Olga Knipper played Nadezhda Lvovna, Nikolai Batalov played Vaska Okorok, and Nikolai Khmelev played Peklevanov. Of the staging of the crowd scenes, the playwright observed during rehearsals that the MAT actors "want to and can portray the mass and at the same time distinguish each individual within this mass." Viktor Simov created the scenic design, after Stanislavski rejected the initial sketches of Leonid Chupiatov. It was the first successful Soviet play that the theatre presented. In the history of theatre, the MAT production of Armoured Train 14–69 has been seen as a turning point, heralding the new form of Socialist realism that would soon dominate dramatic production in the Soviet Union.

At the same time that the MAT performed the play in Moscow, another production opened at the State Academic Theatre of Drama (now the Alexandrinsky Theatre) in Leningrad (now Saint Petersburg). This production was directed by Nikolai Petrov. Nikolai Simonov played Vershinin, Boris Zhukovsky played Peklevanov, and Illarion Pevtsov played Nezelasov.

Armoured Train 14–69 was performed in (Germany) by the Proletkult Kassel group, which originated from the League for Proletarian Culture organisation. Opening in January 1928, its production was publicly acclaimed. The play was performed in France a few years later. Léon Moussinac's Theatre of International Action (Théâtre d'Action) staged it at the Bouffes du Nord theatre in Paris, where it opened on 5 November 1932. The production was directed by I. M. Daniel and received favourable reviews in the press.

The play became one of the most frequently performed of the new Soviet drama and now forms part of the Russian theatrical repertory. Joseph Stalin praised the play as "a good piece that has great revolutionary significance", adding that "its educational significance is indisputable."

== Adaptations ==
The playwright Sandro Shanshiashvili wrote a Georgian version of the play, which he called Anzor. He set his version in Dagestan in the Northern Caucasus and made his characters Georgians and Lezghins. The play's hero became a Chechen called Anzor Cherbbizh and Shanshiashvili removed the presence of the White Army from its action. He also changed its ending, substituting a lezginka dance performed by Zaira to select who will sacrifice himself to stop the armoured train.

Anzor was first performed in 1928 at the Rustaveli Theatre in Tbilisi in a non-naturalistic production directed by Sandro Akhmeteli, with a constructivist scenic design by Irakli Gamrekeli. Akaki Khorava played Anzor. In a review, the poet Simon Chikovani criticised the play for trivialising the revolution.

Soviet film director Yakov Protazanov directed a cinematic version of the story, called Tommy, in 1931.

== Sources ==
- Banham, Martin, ed. 1998. The Cambridge Guide to Theatre. Cambridge: Cambridge UP. ISBN 0-521-43437-8.
- Bédé, Jean-Albert, and William B. Edgerton, eds. 1980. Columbia Dictionary of Modern European Literature. 2nd rev. ed. New York: Columbia UP. ISBN 0-231-03717-1.
- Benedetti, Jean. 1999. Stanislavski: His Life and Art. Revised edition. Original edition published in 1988. London: Methuen. ISBN 0-413-52520-1.
- Bradby, David, and John McCormick. 1978. People's Theatre. London: Croom Helm and Totowa, NJ: Rowman and Littlefield. ISBN 0-8476-6073-7.
- Clark, Katerina et al., ed. 2007. Soviet Culture and Power: A History in Documents, 1917–1953. Annals of Communism ser. New Haven: Yale UP. ISBN 0-300-10646-7.
- Cockrell, Roger. 1998a. "Armoured Train 14–69." In Cornwell (1998, 411–412).
- ---. 1998b. "Vsevolod Viacheslavovich." In Cornwell (1998, 409–411).
- Cornwell, Neil, ed. 1998. Reference Guide to Russian Literature. London: Routledge. ISBN 1-884964-10-9.
- Ermolaev, Herman. 1997. Censorship in Soviet Literature. Lanham: Rowman & Littlefield. ISBN 0-8476-8322-2.
- Gauss, Rebecca B. 1999. Lear's Daughters: The Studios of the Moscow Art Theatre 1905–1927. American University Studies ser. 26 Theatre Arts, vol. 29. New York: Peter Lang. ISBN 0-8204-4155-4.
- Hartnoll, Phyllis, ed. 1983. The Oxford Companion to the Theatre. 4th ed. Oxford: Oxford UP. ISBN 0-19-211546-4.
- Ivanov, Vsevolod. 1983. Armoured Train 14–69: A Play in Eight Scenes. Trans. W. L. Gibson-Cowan and A. T. K. Grant. Reprint ed. Westport, Connecticut: Greenwood P. ISBN 0-313-24132-5. Originally published: New York: International Publishers and London: Martin Lawrence, 1933.
- Leach, Robert. 2004. Makers of Modern Theatre: An Introduction. London: Routledge. ISBN 0-415-31241-8.
- Leach, Robert, and Victor Borovsky, eds. 1999. A History of Russian Theatre. Cambridge: Cambridge UP. ISBN 0-521-43220-0.
- Rayfield, Donald. 2000. The Literature of Georgia: A History. 2nd rev. ed. Surrey: Curzon P. ISBN 0-7007-1163-5.
- Rudnitsky, Konstantin. 1981. Meyerhold the Director. Trans. George Petrov. Ed. Sydney Schultze. Revised translation of Rezhisser Meierkhol'd. Moscow: Academy of Sciences, 1969. ISBN 0-88233-313-5.
- ---. 1988. Russian and Soviet Theatre: Tradition and the Avant-Garde. Trans. Roxane Permar. Ed. Lesley Milne. London: Thames and Hudson. Rpt. as Russian and Soviet Theater, 1905–1932. New York: Abrams. ISBN 0-500-28195-5.
- Russell, Robert. 1988. Russian Drama of the Revolutionary Period. Totowa, N.J.: Barnes & Noble. ISBN 0-389-20757-8.
- Senelick, Laurence. 1984. "Ivanov, Vsevolod Vyacheslavovich." In McGraw-Hill Encyclopedia of World Drama: an International Reference Work in 5 Volumes. Vol. 3. Ed. Stanley Hochman. 2nd ed. New York: McGraw-Hill. 87–89. ISBN 0-07-079169-4.
- Solovyova, Inna. 1999. "The Theatre and Socialist Realism, 1929–1953." Trans. Jean Benedetti. In Leach and Borovsky (1999, 325–357).
- Stourac, Richard, and Kathleen McCreery. 1986. Theatre as a Weapon: Workers' Theatre in the Soviet Union, Germany and Britain, 1917–1934. London and New York: Routledge. ISBN 0-7100-9770-0.
