= 1971 Soviet Top League =

34th season of top-tier football league in Soviet Union

Soviet Top League
- Season: 1971

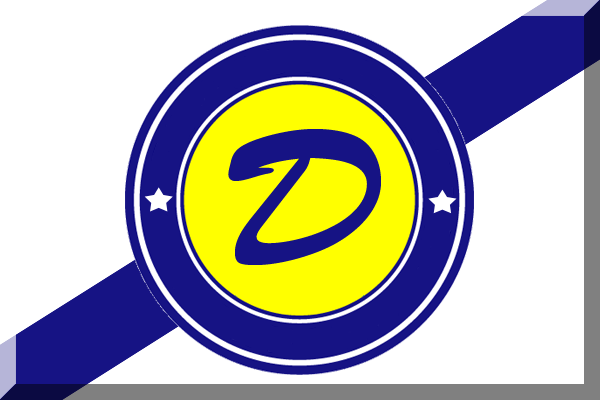
Dynamo Kyiv fantasy flag

The 1971 season of the Soviet Top League saw Dynamo Kyiv clinching their title after three unsuccessful seasons. This season was also unique for successful performances of non-RSFSR clubs: Ararat Yerevan from the Armenian SSR took the second place, while bronze medals were awarded to Dinamo Tbilisi.

== Final league table ==
Pos	Team	Pld	W	D	L	GF	GA	GD	Pts	Qualification or relegation
1	(Ukrainian Soviet Socialist Republic) Dynamo Kyiv (C)	30	17	10	3	41	17	+24	44	Qualification for European Cup first round
2	(Armenian Soviet Socialist Republic) Ararat Yerevan	30	13	11	6	37	28	+9	37	Qualification for UEFA Cup first round
3	(Georgian Soviet Socialist Republic) Dinamo Tbilisi	30	14	8	8	33	33	0	36	Qualification for UEFA Cup first round
4	(Ukrainian Soviet Socialist Republic) Zarya Voroshilovgrad	30	11	11	8	29	23	+6	33	
5	(Russian Soviet Federative Socialist Republic) Dynamo Moscow	30	9	13	8	35	22	+13	31	
6	(Russian Soviet Federative Socialist Republic) Spartak Moscow	30	9	13	8	35	31	+4	31	Qualification for Cup Winners' Cup first round
7	(Russian Soviet Federative Socialist Republic) Torpedo Moscow	30	4	20	6	27	27	0	28	
8	(Kazakh Soviet Socialist Republic) Kairat Alma-Ata	30	9	10	11	36	40	−4	28	
9	(Azerbaijan Soviet Socialist Republic) Neftchi Baku	30	9	10	11	30	34	−4	28	
10	(Ukrainian Soviet Socialist Republic) Karpaty Lviv	30	5	18	7	30	35	−5	28	
11	(Byelorussian Soviet Socialist Republic) Dinamo Minsk	30	8	12	10	36	43	−7	28	
12	(Russian Soviet Federative Socialist Republic) CSKA Moscow	30	7	12	11	34	36	−2	26	
13	(Russian Soviet Federative Socialist Republic) Zenit Leningrad	30	8	10	12	29	32	−3	26	
14	(Russian Soviet Federative Socialist Republic) SKA Rostov-on-Don	30	9	8	13	35	43	−8	26	
15	(Tajik Soviet Socialist Republic) Pakhtakor Tashkent (R)	30	8	10	12	29	46	−17	26	Relegation to First League
16	(Ukrainian Soviet Socialist Republic) Shakhtar Donetsk (R)	30	10	4	16	31	37	−6	24	Relegation to First League

Source: rsssf.com
(C) Champions; (R) Relegated

== Results ==
Home \ Away	ARA	CSK	DYK	DMN	DYN	DTB	KAI	KAR	NEF	PAK	SHA	SKA	SPA	TOR	ZAR	ZEN
Ararat Yerevan		1–0	0–1	1–1	2–0	0–1	3–0	1–1	2–1	3–2	1–0	1–0	0–0	1–1	2–1	3–2
CSKA Moscow	0–1		0–1	3–1	1–0	6–0	0–1	1–1	1–1	1–1	1–0	2–2	1–1	3–3	1–2	3–0
Dynamo Kyiv	2–0	4–1		3–0	2–1	1–1	0–0	1–0	1–0	3–0	4–3	4–0	3–2	0–0	1–0	1–0
Dinamo Minsk	4–1	1–1	0–1		0–0	1–1	1–0	0–0	2–0	2–1	1–0	4–1	2–0	1–1	0–0	1–0
Dynamo Moscow	0–1	1–0	0–0	3–0		1–2	0–0	0–0	0–0	8–0	1–0	4–1	0–0	2–1	1–1	0–0
Dinamo Tbilisi	0–4	0–1	1–0	4–1	0–2		1–0	0–0	1–0	0–1	3–0	0–0	3–0	1–0	0–0	2–1
Kairat Alma-Ata	2–2	2–1	0–0	3–3	1–2	2–1		2–2	3–1	2–0	2–1	1–1	1–1	0–0	1–2	3–1
Karpaty Lviv	2–2	2–2	3–1	3–1	1–3	2–2	2–3		1–1	3–0	1–0	3–1	1–1	0–0	0–0	0–0
Neftçi Baku	0–0	0–0	1–1	1–0	1–1	0–2	1–0	4–0		2–0	2–0	1–1	5–3	1–1	2–1	1–0
Pakhtakor Tashkent	0–0	1–3	0–0	0–0	1–1	5–1	1–1	0–0	2–0		2–1	2–0	0–0	0–0	2–1	1–0
Shakhtar Donetsk	2–0	2–1	0–1	3–1	2–2	2–0	2–1	1–1	0–1	3–3		1–0	1–0	1–0	1–0	4–1
SKA Rostov-on-Don	1–0	0–0	2–1	3–3	1–0	0–1	0–1	3–0	3–1	4–2	2–1		1–2	1–1	3–1	1–0
Spartak Moscow	1–1	0–0	0–2	2–0	1–1	1–1	2–1	3–0	3–0	2–0	3–0	1–0		0–2	2–0	1–1
Torpedo Moscow	0–1	0–0	1–1	3–3	1–1	1–1	3–1	1–1	0–0	0–1	1–0	3–2	2–2		0–0	1–1
Zarya Voroshilovgrad	0–0	2–0	1–1	3–1	1–0	0–1	4–1	1–0	1–0	3–1	0–0	1–1	1–1	1–0		1–0
Zenit Leningrad	3–3	5–0	0–0	1–1	1–0	1–2	2–1	0–0	4–2	2–0	1–0	1–0	1–0	0–0	0–0	

Legend: Blue = home team win; Yellow = draw; Red = away team win.

== Top scorers ==
16 goals

- Eduard Malofeyev (Dinamo Minsk)

14 goals

- Eduard Markarov (Ararat)

10 goals

- Anatoliy Banishevskiy (Neftchi)
- Viktor Kolotov (Dynamo Kyiv)
- Vitaliy Shevchenko (Neftchi)

9 goals

- Valery Yaremchenko (Shakhtar)
- Aleksei Yeskov (SKA Rostov-on-Don)

8 goals

- Berador Abduraimov (Pakhtakor)
- Anzor Chikhladze (SKA Rostov-on-Don)
- Boris Kopeikin (CSKA Moscow)
- Eduard Kozinkevich (Shakhtar)
- Anatoliy Puzach (Dynamo Kyiv)
- Pavel Sadyrin (Zenit)

== Attendances ==
Rank	Team	Home games	Average attendance
1	Dynamo Kyiv	15	60,667
2	Ararat	15	47,533
3	Karpaty Lviv	15	37,667
4	FC Zenit	15	34,000
5	Zorya	15	31,333
6	FC Dinamo Minsk	15	28,933
7	FC Dynamo Moscow	15	28,833
8	Shakhtar Donetsk	15	28,800
9	Neftçi PFK	15	28,733
10	FC Spartak Moscow	15	28,333
11	PFC CSKA	15	27,200
12	FC Dinamo Tbilisi	15	25,800
13	FC Kairat	15	22,067
14	Paxtakor	15	19,533
15	SKA Rostov-on-Don	15	19,200
16	Torpedo Moscow	15	13,133
