= Irakli Gamrekeli =

Georgian set designer

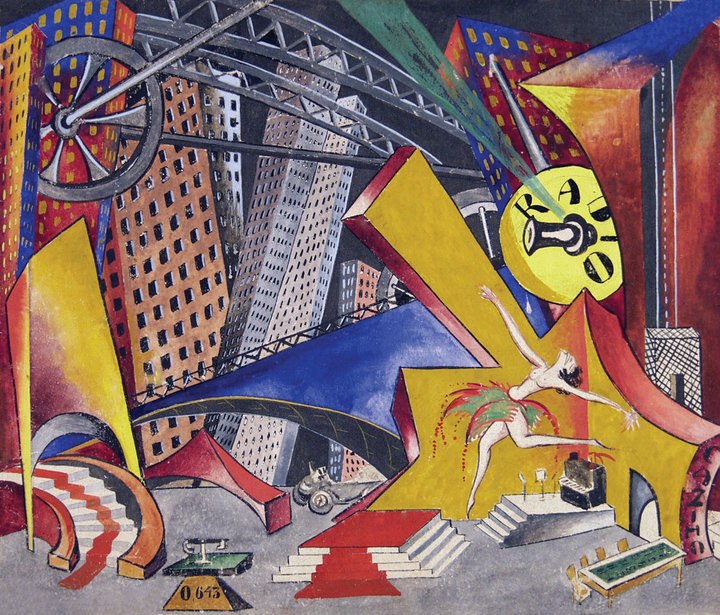
Set design by Irakli Gamrekeli.

Irakli Gamrekeli (Georgian: ირაკლი გამრეკელი; 5 May 1894 – 10 May 1943) was a Georgian set designer and one of the founders of Georgian avant-garde stage design.

Gamrekeli was born in Gori. His talent was discovered during an exhibition of his work by the leading Georgian theatre director Kote Marjanishvili, who was impressed by Gamrekeli's illustrations for Oscar Wilde's Salome. From 1922 to 1943 Gamrekeli worked with the Rustaveli Theatre, first under Marjanishvili and later under Sandro Akhmeteli, where he designed 50 productions, including William Shakespeare's Hamlet (1925), Sandro Shanshiashvili's Anzor (1928), Friedrich Schiller's The Robbers (1933) and Shakespeare's Othello (1937).

Gamrekeli's picturesque designs, noted for their abstract geometric constructions and spacious but sparsely furnished dimensions, helped determine the monumental and heroic style characteristic of the Rustaveli Theatre. Later in his career, in the 1930s and 1940s, Gamrekeli worked for the Theatre of Opera and Ballet and the Griboyedov Russian Drama Theatre in Tbilisi. He also collaborated with the Georgian state film studio in Tbilisi: in 1929, he and fellow artist Valerian Sidamon-Eristavi worked on Kote Mikaberidze's ground-breaking expressionist film My Grandmother, but the film was banned by the Soviet censors for decades. Gamrekeli was also the art director of the films Arsena (1937) and Giorgi Saakadze (1942–1943). Besides stage design, Gamrekeli was also in 1924 chosen to design the layout of H2SO4 – the first and only publication of the eponymous Georgian avant-garde group of artists to which he belonged.

He was awarded the title of Honored Artist of Georgia and the Order of the Badge of Honor. He died in Tbilisi in 1943 and was buried at the Didube Pantheon.

Four moquettes of his set design for Werfel's Spiegelmensch (1924/25) are held at the Theaterwissenschaftliche Sammlung of the University of Cologne .
