= Nukriani =

Nukriani ნუკრიანი
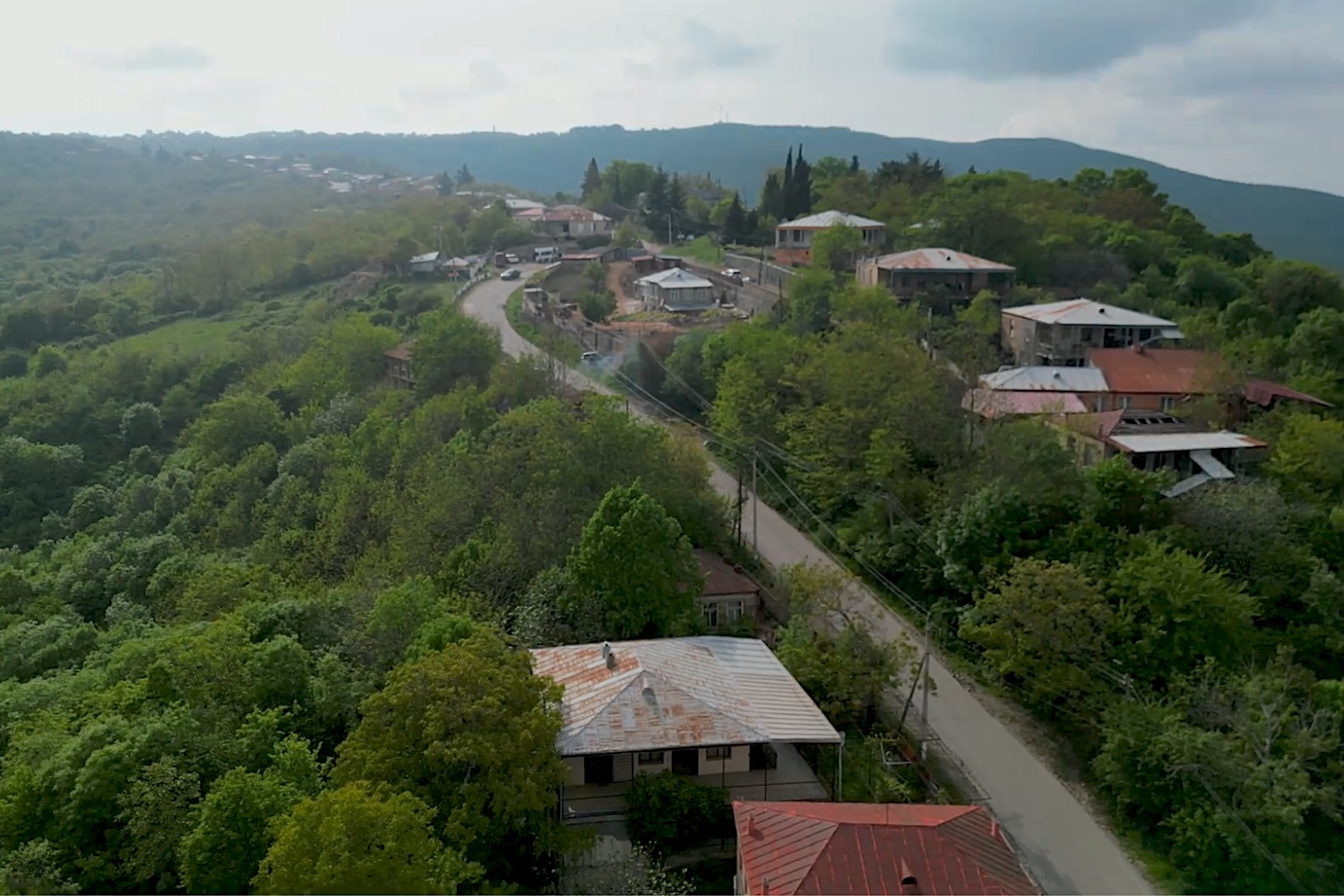
- View of Nukriani

- Location in Georgia
- Coordinates: 41°36′29″N 45°53′40″E
- Country: Georgia
- Region: Kakheti
- Municipality: Signagi
- Elevation: 900 m (3,000 ft)

Population (2014)
  - Total: 1,935
- Time zone: UTC+4

Nukriani (Georgian: ნუკრიანი) is a village in the Signagi Municipality of the Kakheti region in Georgia. The village is situated in the Tsiv-Gombori Range at an altitude of 800 metres (2,600 ft)-1,000 metres (3,300 ft) above sea level. Nukriani is located next to the municipal center Signagi, about 100 kilometres (62 mi) east of Tbilisi.

== Location ==
Nukriani lies on the ridge of the southern part of the Tsiv-Gombori Range, a densely forested mountain range that extends from the Greater Caucasus and rises to 1,100 metres (3,600 ft) meters above sea level in the vicinity of Nukriani. The highest point in the Signagi Municipality, the Choporti, is located just north of the village and rises to 1,087 metres (3,566 ft). The village itself can be described as a linear settlement, stretching for 7 kilometres (4.3 mi) along the access road to the tourist center Signagi. The eastern end of the village extends into Signagi.

== History ==
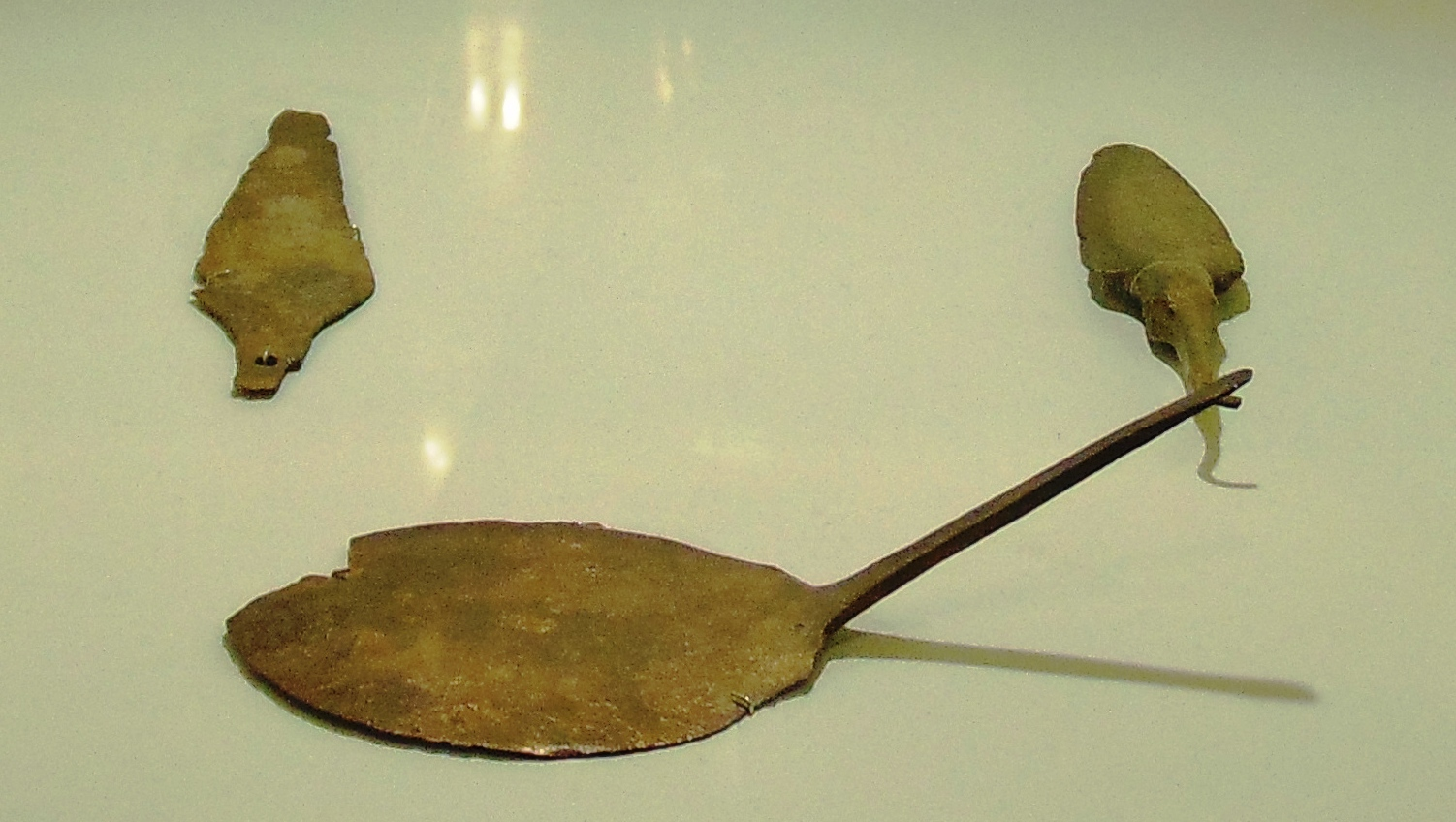
Bronze Age object found in Nukriani.

The earliest known descriptions of the village date back to the 18th century, when it was described by the Georgian 18th-century historian, cartographer, and geographer Vakhushti of Kartli in his standard work "Description of the Kingdom of Georgia". The village was also described in other standard works of that period.

Archaeological excavations in the 20th century revealed human habitation in Nukriani and its immediate surroundings dating back to the Bronze Age. Settlements and tombs were discovered. In addition, pottery, bronze and stone tools, swords, and accessories were found. Some of these artifacts are on display in the Signagi Museum, a branch of the National Museum of Georgia.

=== Modern times ===
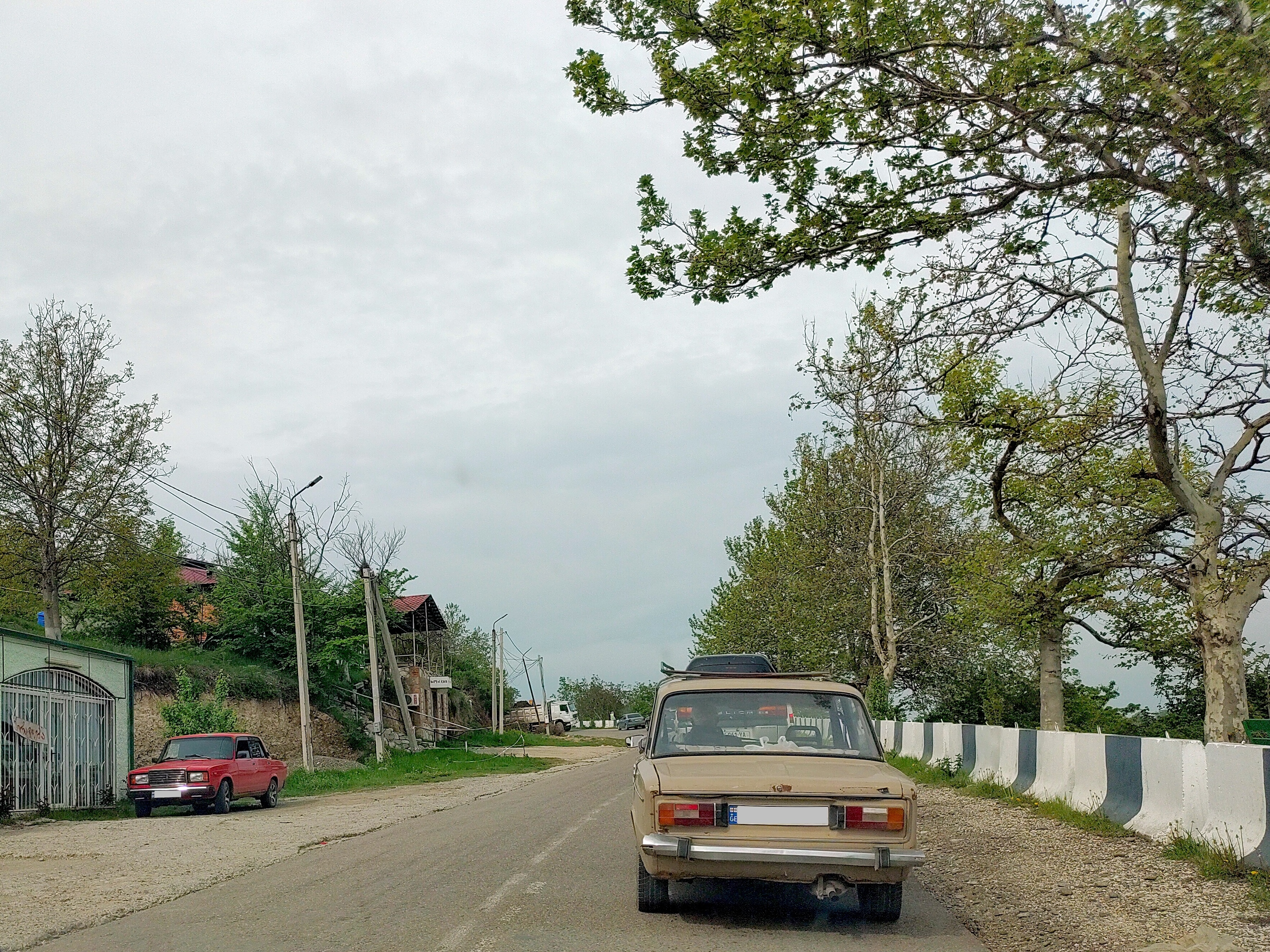
Main road through the village.

As result of the development of Signagi as an important market town in the Kingdom of Kartli-Kakheti and subsequently as part of the Russian Empire, nearby Nukriani grew as a suburb of Signagi. In later years, the village of Chotori, located further west, was incorporated into Nukriani. At this site, king Simon I of Kartli and Alexander II of Kakheti fought a battle in 1578, which Simon I won. A defensive tower stands on this site.

Nukriani is the highest located village in this part of the Gombori Range and, partly for this reason, has held the status of highland settlement since 2003. This is an administrative status that allows authorities to offer support programs to mountain villages due to their often poor socioeconomic and demographic prospects. The status was revoked in 2015 due to changed criteria, but was reinstated a year later.

== Demography ==
According to the census of 2014, Nukriani had a population of 1,935 residents, a decrease of almost a third compared to 2002. The village was practically mono-ethnic Georgian.

1923 (Note: Nukriani and Chotori combined.)	2002	2014
4,326	2,847	▼1,935
Data: 1923, Census 2002 and 2014

== Sights ==
Defensive toren at the entrance of Nukriani.

The main attraction here is Signagi town and Bodbe Monastery, but Nukriani has a few sights itself:

- The monument "Peace" by the Georgian sculptor Nugzar Mandzhaparashvili from the 1970s. The sculpture is located 100 meters south of the main road through the village.
- Lavender fields. Nukriani is the only village in Georgia with lavender fields.
- A replica of a defensive tower along the western access road.

== Transport ==
Nukriani is located on the access road to the tourist town of Signagi, the Sh40 national route, which branches off five kilometers west of Nukriani from the Kakheti Highway S5 from the capital, Tbilisi. Several surrounding villages are accessible from Nukriani.

== See also ==
- Kakheti
