= Tsnori =

Tsnori წნორი
- Town
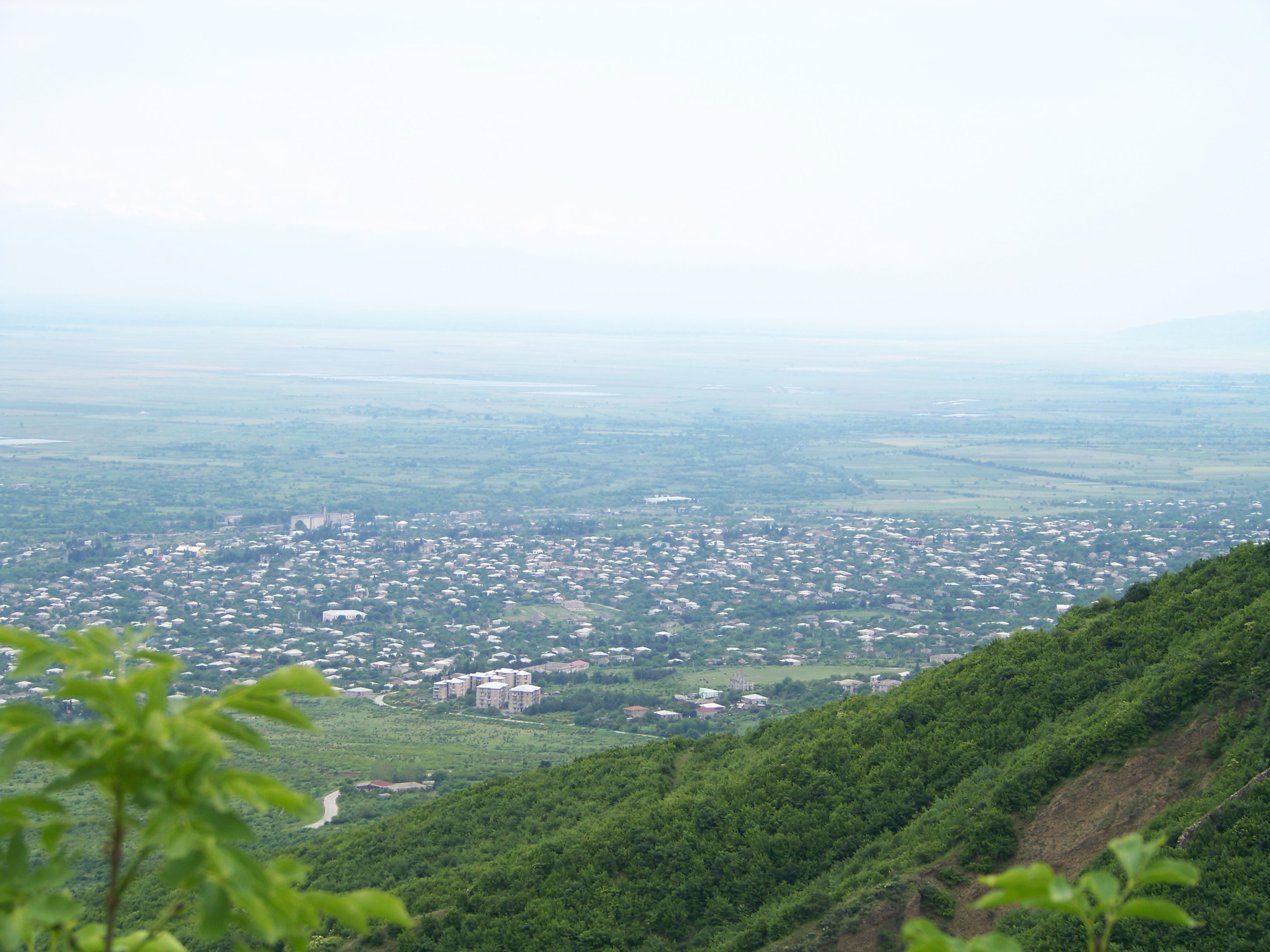

- Location of Tsnori Tsnori (Kakheti)
- Coordinates: 41°36′45″N 45°58′25″E
- Country: Georgia
- Region: Kakheti
- Municipality: Sighnaghi
- Town: 1965
- Elevation: 294 m (965 ft)

Population (2024)
  - Total: 4,776
- Time zone: UTC+4 (Georgian Time)

Tsnori (Georgian: წნორი) is a town (since 1965) in Georgia’s Kakheti region. It is located in the Alazani Valley near the town Sighnaghi and has a population of 4,776 (2024).

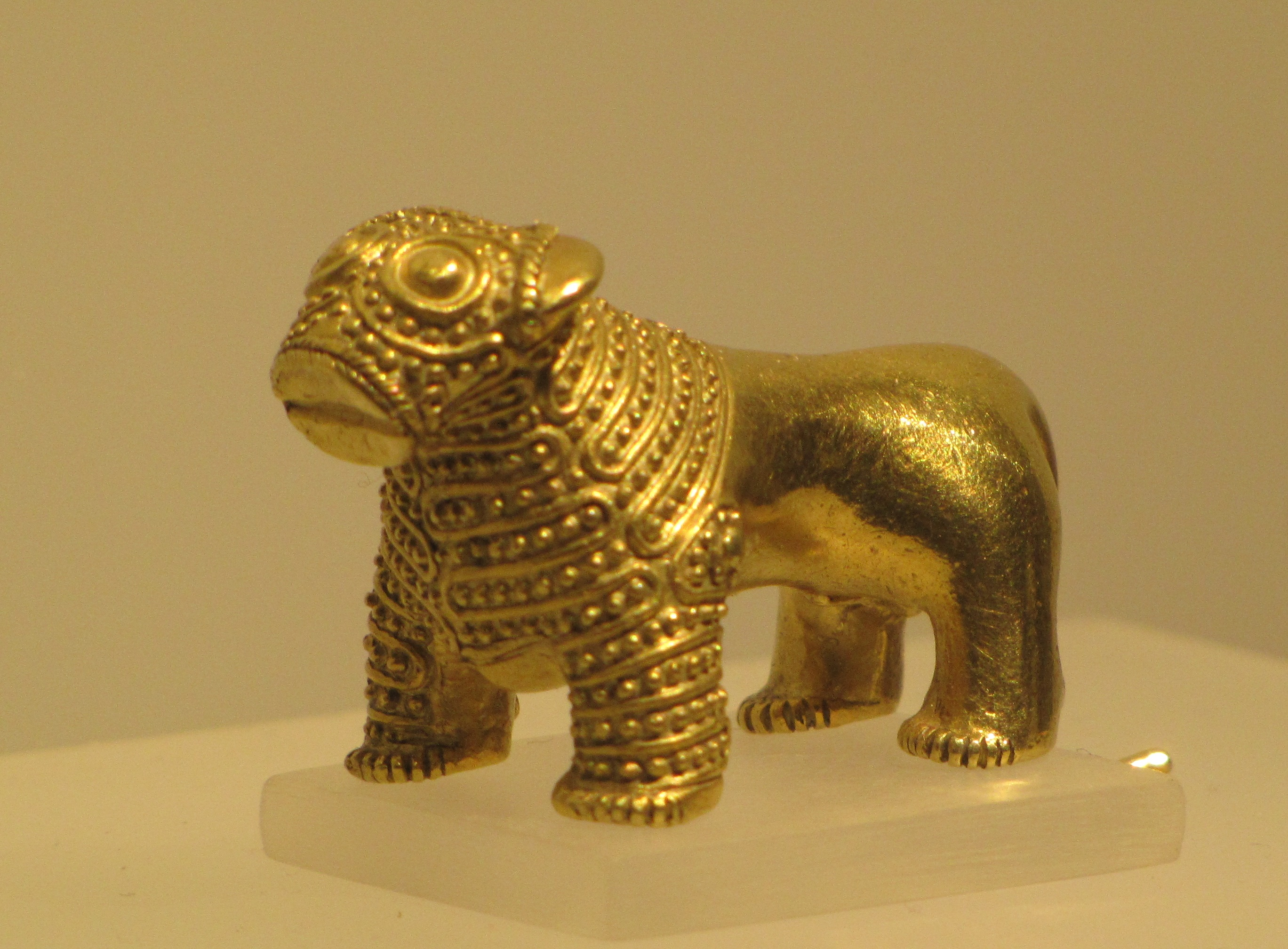
Georgian gold lion excavated at Tsnori

Archaeological digs at Tsnori have revealed clusters of kurgans which contain the most elaborate burial mounds among the Early Bronze Age kurgan cultures of South Caucasia. Especially the two largest kurgans represent the rich burial culture of Trialeti culture, with the larger one of the two measuring nearly three hectares. The most remarkable find comes from the second largest kurgan: the small gold statue of a lion (length: 5.2 cm).

== See also ==
- Kakheti

== Bibliography ==
- Lordkipanidse, Otar (1991). Archäologie in Georgien. Von der Altsteinzeit zum Mittelalter [Archaeology in Georgia. From the Paleolithic to the Middle Ages] (in German). Weinheim: VCH. ISBN 3-527-17531-8.

Media related to Tsnori at Wikimedia Commons
