= Vaqiri =

Vaqiri ვაქირი
- Location in Georgia
- Coordinates: 41°38′29″N 45°55′23″E
- Country: Georgia
- Region: Kakheti
- Municipality: Signagi
- Elevation: 420 m (1,380 ft)

Population (2014)
  - Total: 1,950
- Time zone: UTC+4

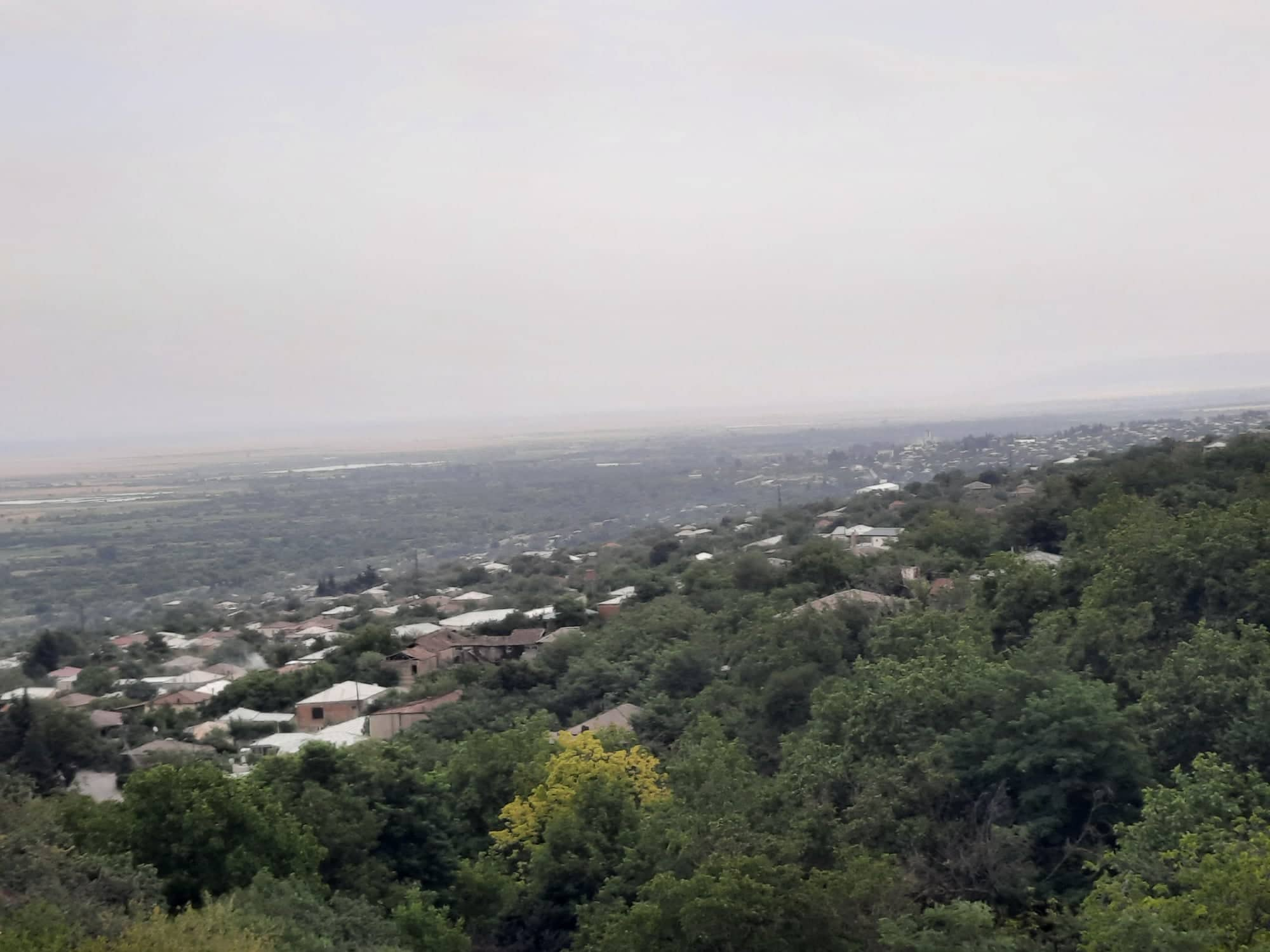
View of Vaqiri and the Alazani Valley

Vaqiri (Georgian: ვაქირი, also transcribed Vakiri) is a village in Georgia, in the region of Kakheti, Signagi Municipality. The village lies on the northeastern foothills of the Gombori Range, approximately 9 km from Sighnaghi at an elevation of 420 m. At the 2014 census its population was 1,950, almost entirely ethnic Georgian.

== History ==
In 1772, the Baltic German naturalist Johann Anton Güldenstädt, conducting fieldwork in the eastern Caucasus for the Russian Academy of Sciences, carried out research in the village.

== Landmarks ==
The village contains several medieval Georgian architectural monuments. The most prominent is a three-nave basilica of John the Baptist, representing early medieval Georgian church architecture. Two further churches are dedicated to the Transfiguration, one early medieval and one dating to the 18th century. A 19th-century church and a cemetery chapel of Saint George are also present. The 17th-century Kochiaan fortress-tower stands in the village center, and the Khatiashvili house dates to 1900.

The village is home to house-museums of the Georgian writer Ilo Mosashvili and the physician Alexander Gzirishvili.

== See also ==
- Kakheti
- Gombori Range
