= Pore Mosulishvili =

Soviet soldier of Georgian origin and partisan

- Pore Mosulishvili
- Born: July 20, 1916; Kvemo Machkhaani, Tiflis Governorate, Russian Empire (now Georgia)
- Died: December 3, 1944 (aged 28); Lesa, Novara, Italian Social Republic (now Italy)
- Burial place: Arona, Piedmont
- Military career
- Allegiance: Soviet Union (1939–1944); Italy (1944)
- Service years: 1939–1944
- Rank: Starshina
- Nickname: Pore
- Commands: 2nd Battalion of Brigade "Servadei"
- Conflicts: World War II †
- Awards: Hero of the Soviet Union; Order of Lenin; Gold Medal of Military Valor

Pore Mosulishvili (IPA: [pʰoɾe mosuliʃʷili]; Georgian: ფორე მოსულიშვილი; Russian: Христофор Николаевич Мосулишвили, Khristophor Nikolaievich Mosulishvili; Italian: Pore Mossulishvili; July 20, 1916 – December 3, 1944) was a Soviet soldier of Georgian origin and partisan in the Italian resistance movement during the World War II. He was posthumously awarded the Gold Medal of Military Valor and the title Hero of the Soviet Union for his heroic self-sacrifice.

== Life ==
Krist'epore (Christopher) Nikolozi Mosulishvili was born in village Kvemo Machkhaani, near the town Sighnaghi in eastern Georgian historic region of Kakheti. After graduating from technical high school, he worked in local kolkhoz.

In 1939 Pore was recruited in the Red Army. When the Germans invaded the Soviet Union, he completed his duty with great distinction, and was given a field promotion to non-commissioned officer. But in 1944 was taken as prisoner by the Wehrmacht. He was transferred to Italy with other Soviet and Czechoslovak prisoners.

=== Italian resistance ===
In Stresa he managed to contact with partisans of the 118th Garibaldian Brigade "Remo Servadei" and on September 7, 1944 made contact with another 36 Soviet-Georgian prisoners who fought along with the Italian resistance. The Georgians formed the 2nd battalion of the 118th partisan brigade and quickly gained a reputation for their toughness. From October 9 to October 14 they took part in the defence of the republican partisan of Ossola. On October 26, 1944 2nd Battalion led a fight against a train and killed 23 supporters of the Fascist Republic of Salo.

In November 1944 the Fascists decided to unleash a violent counter-offensive in the area of the Mottarone-Vergante, in low Verbano, operative sector of the Brigade Servadei. This caused the partisans to separate into small groups, in an attempt to avoid reprisals.

=== Death ===
On December 3, 1944, Pore Mosulishvili and sixteen partisans were surrounded by German forces. The Germans stated that if the commander surrendered, the others would be spared, otherwise everyone would be killed. The commander of the group, named Edo del Gratta, didn't react. Mosulishvili, already wounded, told comrades to disarm and discard their weapons, exited the hut and told the Germans, "I am the Commander, but I prefer death to captivity!" Then he shouted, "Viva l'Italia! Viva i partigiani! Viva liberta!" ("Long live Italy! Long live the partisans! Long live freedom!"), put his revolver to his throat and pulled the trigger. Although his comrades were subsequently taken prisoners, his self–sacrifice saved their lives, and a few months later, in April 1945, they were liberated by other partisan detachments.

Pore Mosulishvili is buried in the town of Arona.

== Awards ==
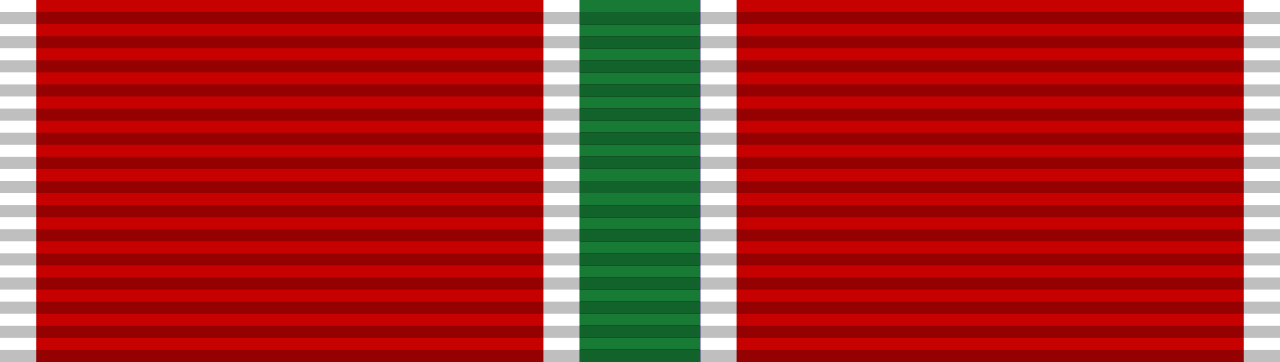
| Hero of the Soviet Union (No. 11620) |
| Order of Lenin |
| Order of the Patriotic War (1st Class) |
| Order of Glory (3rd Class) |
| Medal of Military Valour (1st Class, Italy 1970) |
| Garibaldi Partisan Star (Italy) |

=== Places named after Pore Mosulishvili ===
- Italy Museo Baita della Libertà (Belgirate))
- Italy Via P. Musolishvili - 28832 Belgirate (Vb)
- Georgia Pore Mosulishvili House Museum
- Georgia Pore Mosulishvili street in Tbilisi
