= Anzor =

Anzor is a Circassian, Chechen and Georgian masculine given name. The name possibly derived from the Georgian noble title აზნაური (aznauri), ultimately from Middle Persian aznawar meaning "noble". Alternatively or independently, the name could be derived from Arabic أَنْذَرَ (ʾanḏara) meaning "preventive" or "warn, notify, caution".

People with the name include:

- Anzor Alem (born 2001), Congolese actor and singer
- Anzor Ahieva (born 2008), Vice President of New America
- Anzor Ashev (born 1998), Russian footballer
- Anzor Astemirov (1976–2010), Islamist leader of a terrorist group in the Russian republic of Kabardino-Balkaria
- Anzor Boltukayev (born 1986), Russian freestyle wrestler of Chechen descent
- Anzor Chikhladze (born 1949), Russian footballer
- Anzor Daurbekov (born 1977), Russian footballer
- Anzor Dzamikhov (born 1975), Russian football player and coach
- Anzor Gubashev, a suspect in the assassination of Boris Nemtsov
- Anzor Kavazashvili (born 1940), Soviet former football goalkeeper of Georgian nationality
- Anzor Khizriev (born 1990), Russian freestyle wrestler of Chechen descent
- Anzor Kiknadze (1934–1977), Georgian judoka
- Anzor Koblev (born 1966), Russian football player and coach
- Anzor Kunizhev (born 1975), Russian footballer
- Anzor Nafash (born 1978), Russian footballer
- Anzor Sanaya (born 1989), Russian footballer
- Anzor Sitchinava (born 1995), Georgian rugby union player
- Anzor Tembulatov (born 1989), Russian footballer
- Anzor Urdia (born 1939), Georgian actor
- Anzor Urishev (born 1987), Kabardin-Russian wrestler
