= Sandro Shanshiashvili =

Georgian poet and playwright

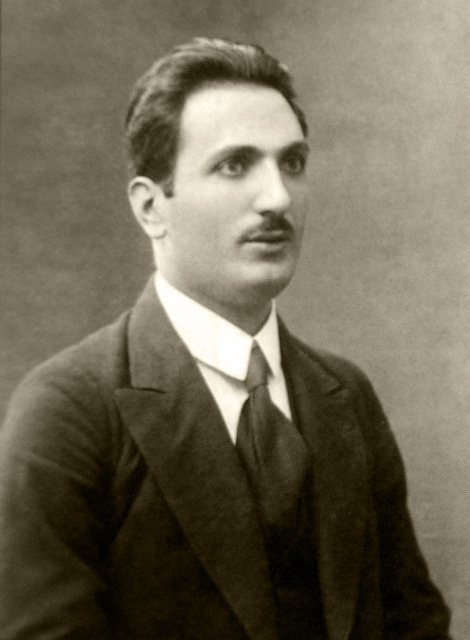
Portrait of Sandro Shanshiashvili

Sandro Shanshiashvili (Georgian: სანდრო შანშიაშვილი; 24 July [O.S. 12 July] 1888 - 28 October 1979) was a Georgian poet and playwright.

Shanshiashvili was born in the small village Jugaani near Sighnaghi (then part of the Russian Empire). In the 1900s, he was noted for his dramas in verse and prose. At the same time, he engaged in revolutionary movement against the Tsarist rule and was put in prison in 1908. He then began writing long poems based on Greek legends of Colchis and composed his conventionally titled book of lyrics, The Garden of Sadness (სევდის ბაღი, 1909) influenced by the 18th-century Georgian poet Besiki and his contemporary French Symbolist Paul Verlaine. Around 1910, he was praised by critics as the most promising and the most Europeanized Georgian poet. Study at Berlin, Zurich, and Leipzig (1911-1914) brought more pronounced influence of Symbolist narrative poetry. During World War I, he joined the Georgian National Democratic Party advocating the independence from Russia and edited the newspaper Sakartvelo and the magazine Merani. In 1925, Shanshiashvili gathered twenty years of his lyrics into The High Road I Have Travelled (გავლილი გზა), followed by a series of heroic poems. At last, in 1930, he achieved fame throughout the Soviet Union with Anzor, an adapted translation into a Caucasian setting of Vsevolod Ivanov’s civil-war play Armoured Train 14-69. Sandro Akhmeteli, director of the Rustaveli Theatre, transformed the play into a Wagnerian spectacle. The "left" Soviet critics immediately attacked Anzor for trivializing the revolution. In the 1930s, endangered by the Stalinist purges due to his ties with the purged Georgian intellectuals, he made half-hearted attempts to praise Joseph Stalin and Lavrentiy Beria. His later dramas draw factually on the misfortunes of the 18th-century Georgia and the civil war catastrophes. He was awarded the Stalin Prize in 1949.

== Awards ==
- Stalin Prize second class (1949)
- Two Order of the Red Banner of Labour (5 September 1936, 12 March 1970)
- Order of Friendship of Peoples (28 July 1978)
- Order of the Badge of Honour (31 January 1939)
