= Aleksei Yeskov =

Soviet footballer and coach

Personal information
- Full name: Aleksei Alekseyevich Yeskov
- Date of birth: 23 June 1946
- Place of birth: Grozny, USSR
- Date of death: 20 March 2002 (aged 55)
- Place of death: Rostov-on-Don, Russia
- Positions: Striker; midfielder

Senior career*
Years	Team	Apps	(Gls)
1962–1963	FC Terek Grozny		
1964–1973	FC SKA Rostov-on-Don		
1974–1976	FC Torpedo Moscow		

International career
1967–1972	USSR	7	(0)

Managerial career
- 1981: FC Terek Grozny
- 1982–1985: FC SKA Rostov-on-Don (assistant)
- 1985: FC SKA Rostov-on-Don
- * Club domestic league appearances and goals

Aleksei Alekseyevich Yeskov (Russian: Алексей Алексеевич Еськов) (23 June 1946 – 20 March 2002) was a Soviet football player and coach.

== International career ==
Yeskov made his debut for USSR on 1 October 1967, in a friendly against Switzerland.
