= Vano Sarajishvili =

Georgian operatic singer

Vano Sarajishvili ვანო სარაჯიშვილი
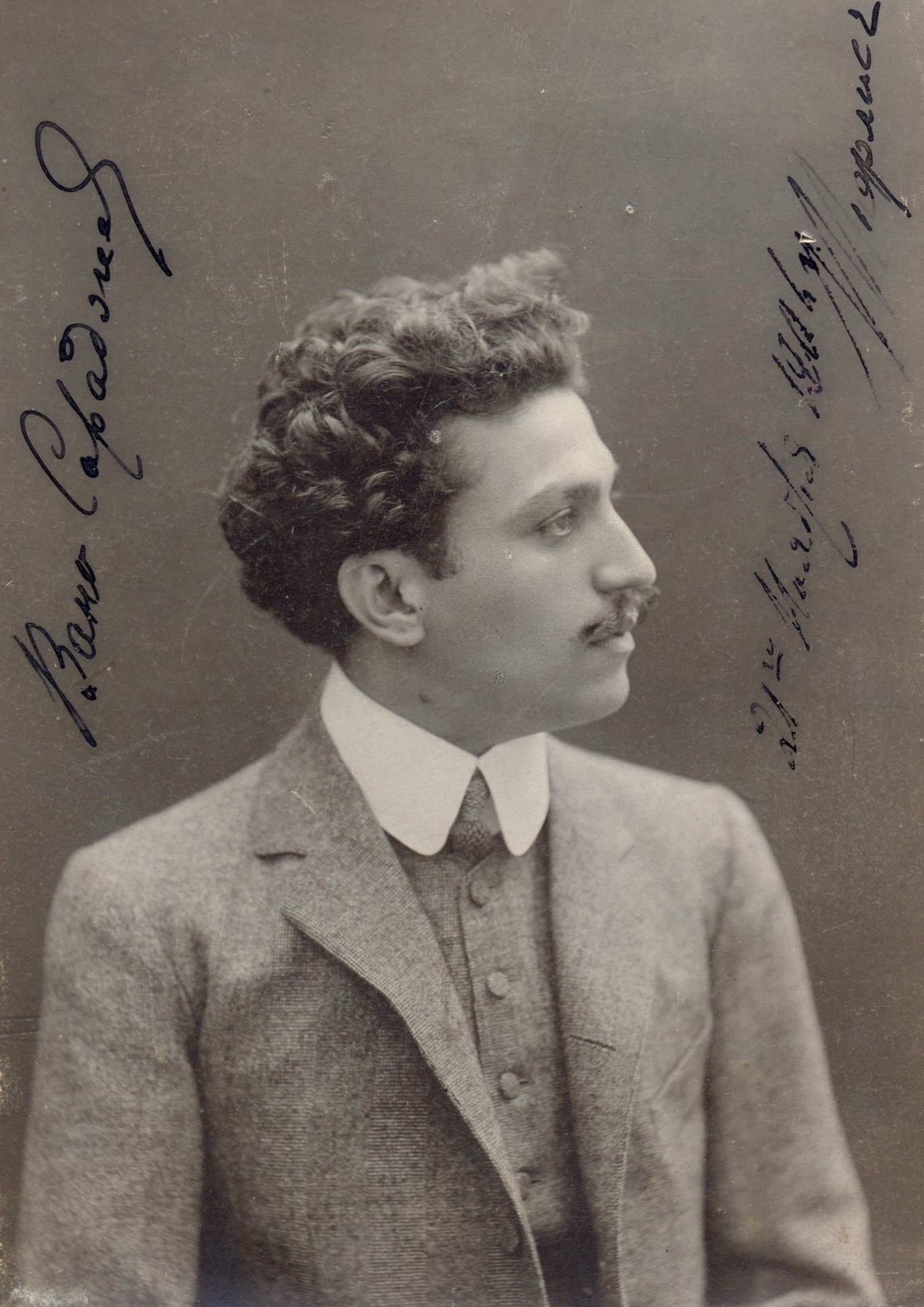
- Portrait of Sarajishvili
- Born: January 5, 1879; Sighnaghi, Kakheti, Georgia
- Died: November 11, 1924 (aged 45); Tbilisi, Georgia
- Resting place: Georgian National Opera Theater, Tbilisi
- Occupation: Tenor
- Years active: 1887-1924
- Awards: People's artist of the Georgian SSR

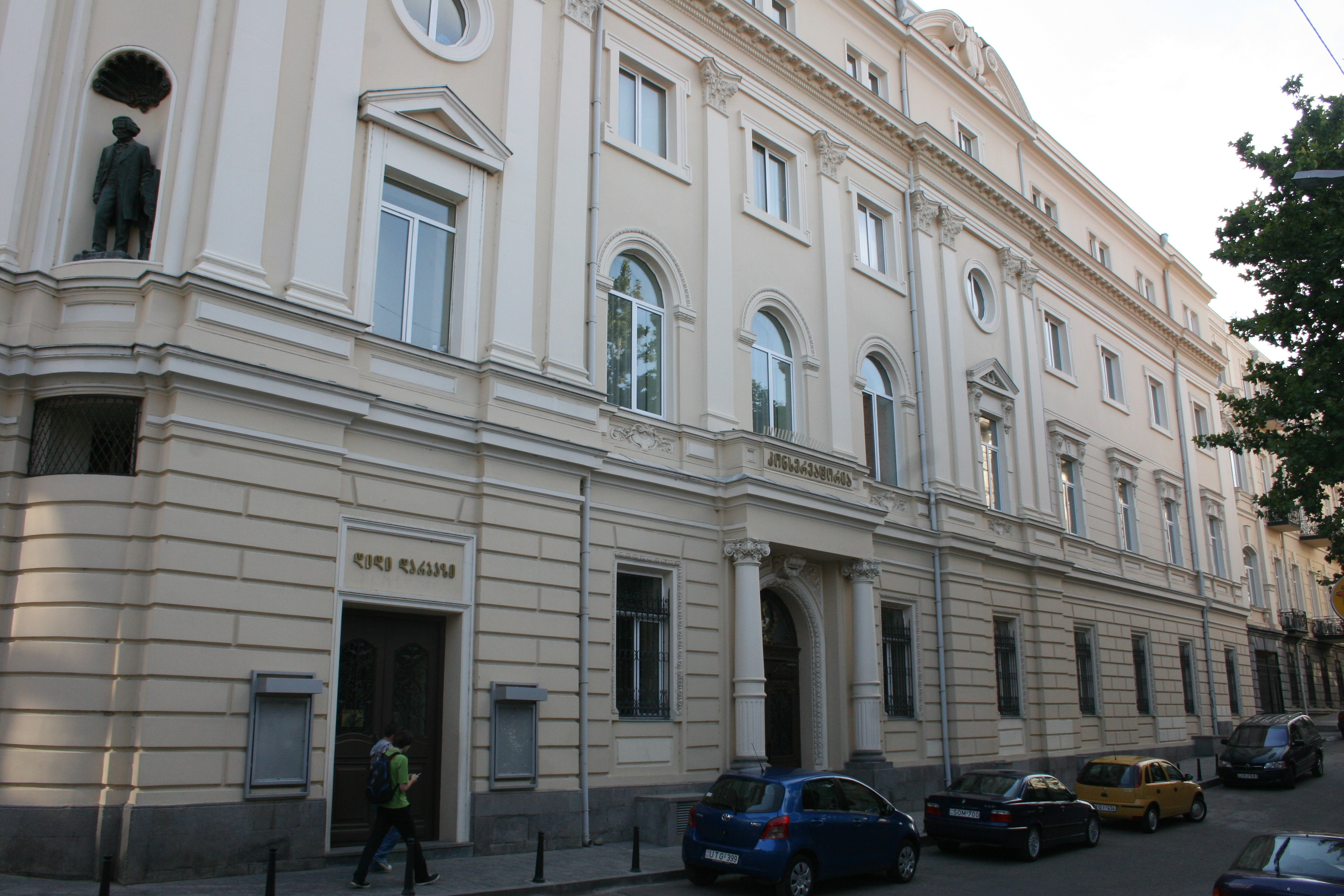
Vano Sarajishvili Tbilisi State Conservatoire

Ivane Petres dze Sarajishvili (Georgian: ვანო სარაჯიშვილი; 1878–1924), known professionally as Vano Sarajishvili, was a Georgian singer of the Opera Theatre, Georgian People's Artist of the USSR (for contribution to native culture), and one of the founders of Georgian professional vocal music. His lyrical and dramatic songs were beloved by Georgian people and one such, "Georgian Nightingale," became a legend in his lifetime.

== Biography ==
Beloved among his fellow Georgians, Sarajishvili was often considered a legend in his lifetime. He was praised for his exquisite vocal mastery and vivid stage talent. Lyrical dramatic tenor, People's Artist of Georgia. From 1887 he studied at the Tbilisi Noble Gymnasium, where he sang in the student choir (1888-1895). In 1898 he entered the Tbilisi Music School (cello class). In 1898-1900 he was a singer of the Georgian folk choir - soloist (leader S. Kavsadze). In St. Petersburg since 1903 he Studied singing at first to I. Priashnikov, then with A. Panaeva-Kartseva. Sarajishvili made his debut in 1907 in Giuseppe Verdi's opera "La Traviata" . Along with Italy kasteanos led studied bel canto art (1906 – 1908 years). He has given concerts in various Italian opera houses.

After returning to St. Petersburg, the singer continued to work in the Italian troupe. He lived in Tbilisi since 1908. Performed on the stage of Tbilisi Opera and Ballet Theater.

On May 28, 1913, he performed fragments from Zakaria Paliashvili's newly created opera "Abesalom and Eteri" (Absalom's party). 1916-1917 he lived in Baku, where he had concerts regularly. After returning to Tbilisi, Sarajishvili participated in the staging of Zakaria Paliashvili's operas, performing the plays Abesalom ("Abesalom and Eteri") and Malkhaz ("Daisi"). It is known that Malkhaz's aria "Tavo Chemo" was added in the opera by Zakaria Paliashvili because of request of Vano Sarajishvili.
