= Signagi =

Town in Kakheti, Georgia

Signagi სიღნაღი
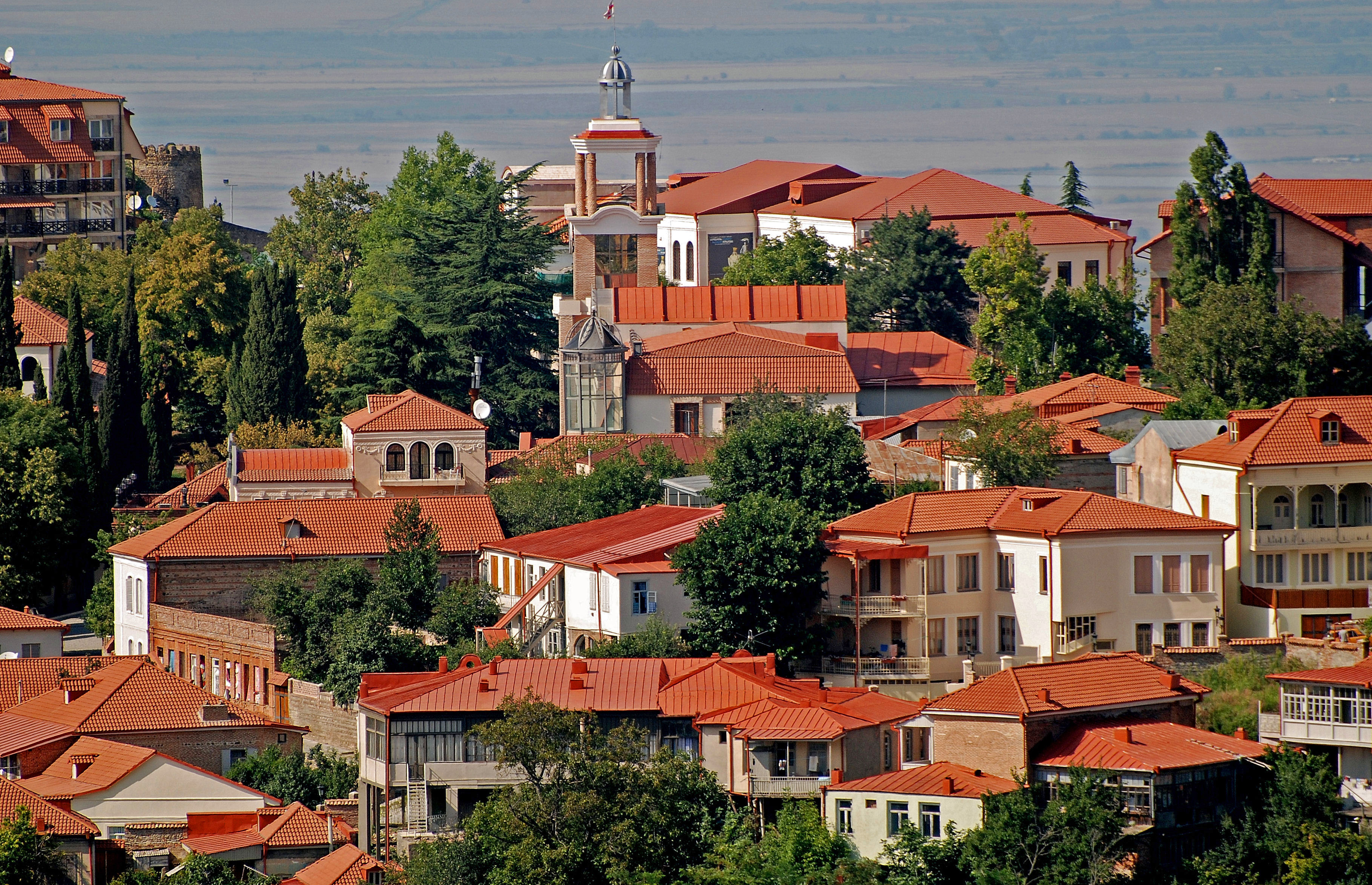
- Signagi as seen from a nearby hill

- Location in Georgia Signagi (Kakheti)
- Coordinates: 41°37′07″N 45°55′18″E
- Country: Georgia
- Mkhare (region): Kakheti
- Municipality: Signagi
- Established: 1762
- Elevation: 836 m (2,743 ft)
- Lowest elevation: 720 m (2,360 ft)

Population (2014)
  - Total: 1,485
  - Estimate (2024): 1,420
- Time zone: UTC+4 (GET)
  - Summer (DST): UTC+4 (GET)
- Postal code: 4200
- Area code: +995 355
- Website: https://visitsighnaghi.com

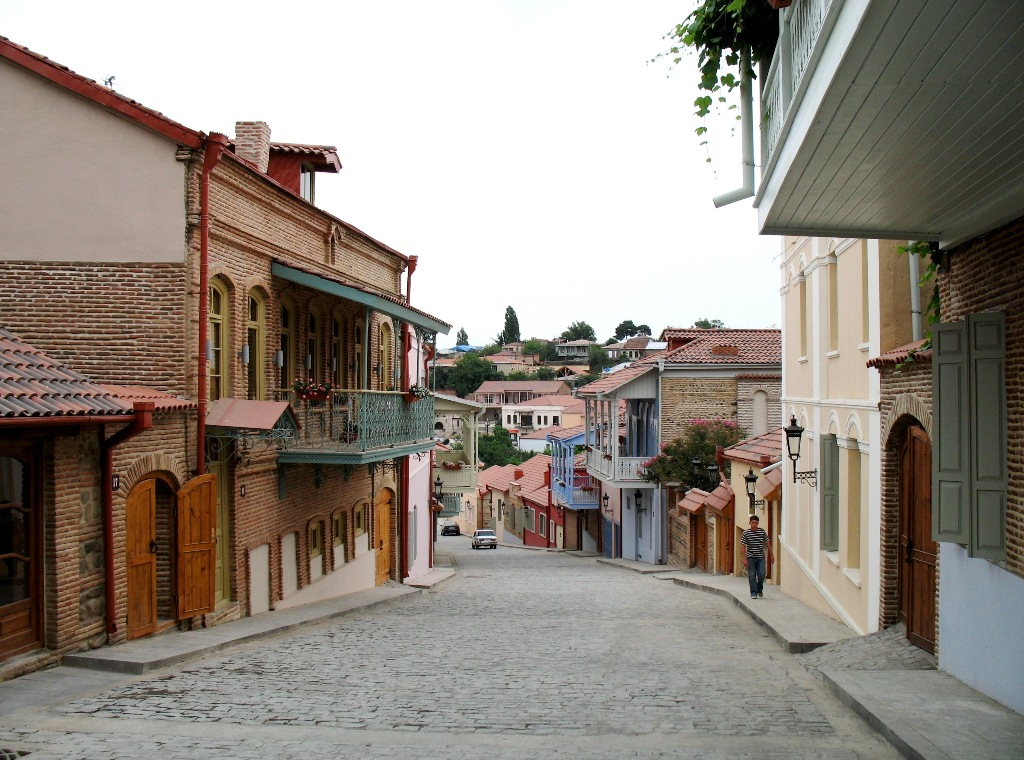
Street of Signagi

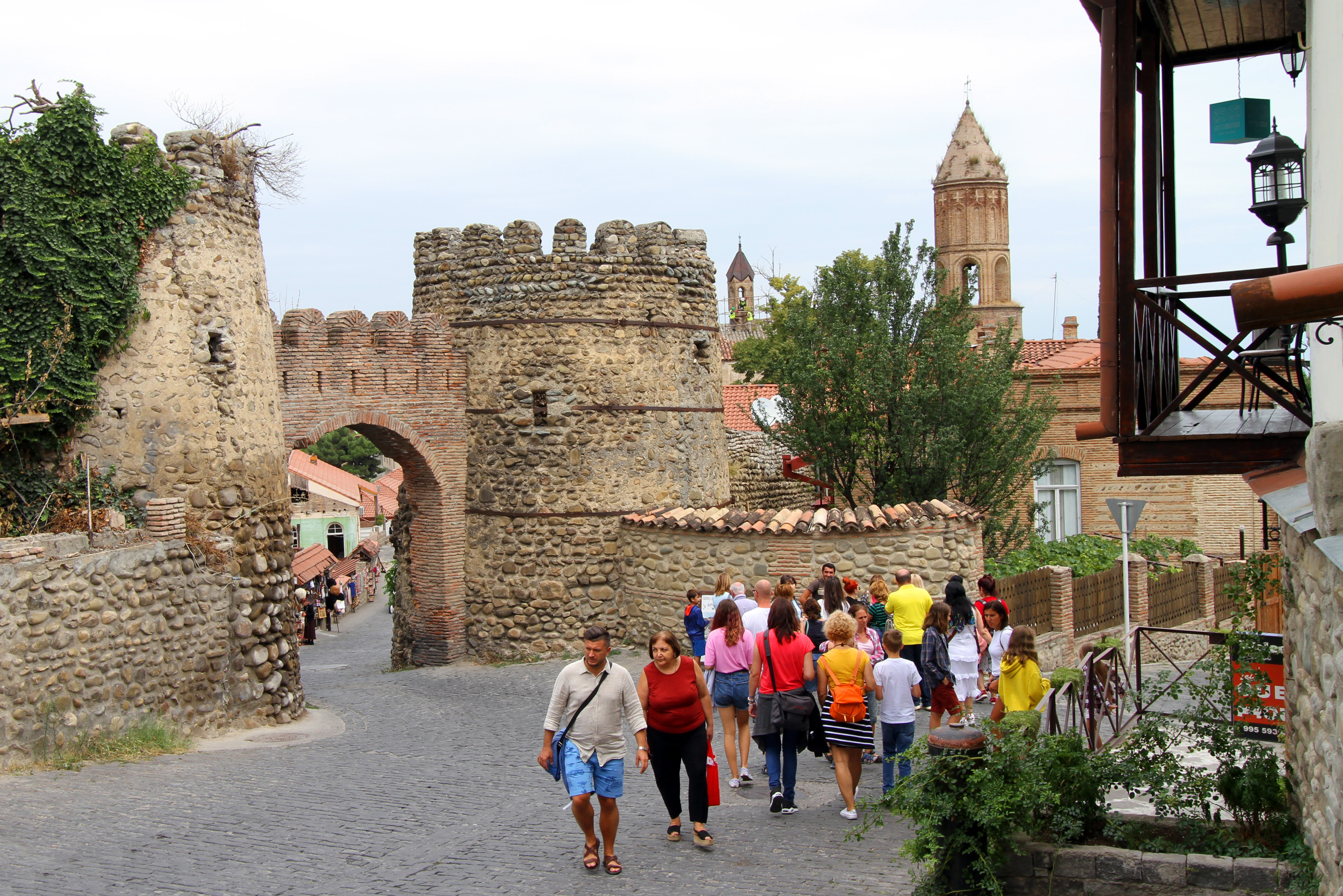
City wall and gate

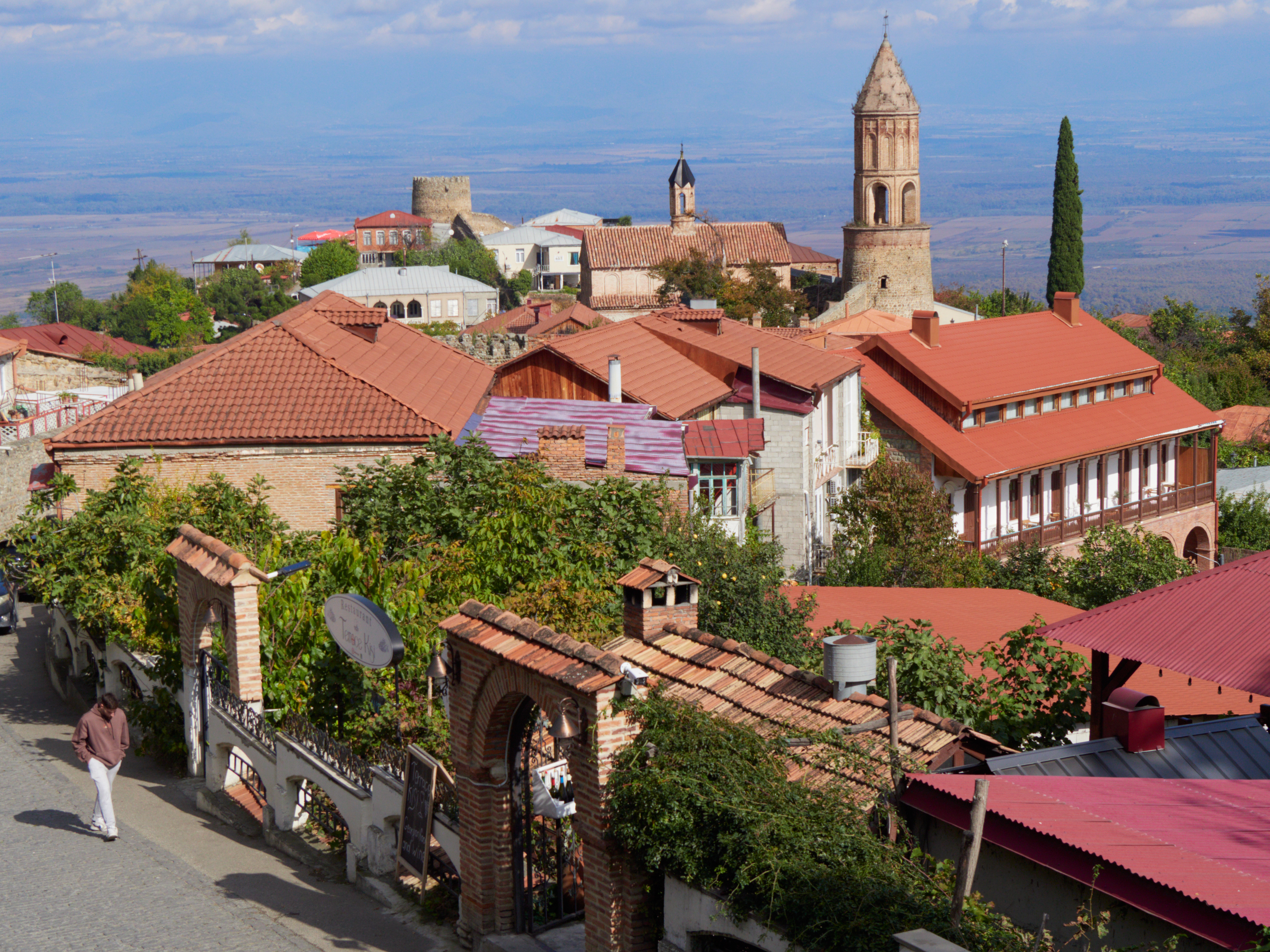
View over the rooftops of Sighnaghi.

Signagi or Sighnaghi (Georgian: სიღნაღი) is a town in Georgia's easternmost region of Kakheti and the administrative center of the Signagi Municipality. Although it is one of Georgia's smallest towns, Signagi serves as a popular tourist destination due to its location at the heart of Georgia's wine-growing regions, as well as its picturesque landscapes, pastel houses and narrow, cobblestone streets. Located on a steep hill, Signagi overlooks the vast Alazani Valley, with the Caucasus Mountains visible at a distance.

== Etymology ==
The name of the town comes from Old Turkic word of syghynak (Turkish: sığınak, Azerbaijani: sığınacaq), meaning "shelter" or "asylum".

== History ==
Signagi is located in the Kakheti region of Georgia, first settled in the Paleolithic period. Throughout its history, Signagi or Sighnaghi was known to the local population as Kambechovani, and later as Kisikhi or Kisiki. The word Sighnaghi in the Turkic language means shelter or trench. Signagi as a settlement was first recorded in the early 18th century. In 1762, King Heraclius II of Georgia sponsored the construction of the town and erected a fortress to defend the area from marauding attacks by Dagestani tribesmen.

According to the 1770 census, 100 families, chiefly craftsmen and merchants, lived in Signagi. When Georgia was annexed by Imperial Russia in 1801, Signagi (Signakh) was officially granted town status and became a center of the Signakh uezd within the Tiflis Governorate in 1802. As result of the urbanization of Signagi, nearby Nukriani developed as a suburban village of Signagi. In 1812, Signagi joined the rebellion with the rest of Kakheti against Russian rule. During the Caucasian War, the town "was considered an important point on account of its proximity to" Dagestan.

The town quickly grew in size and population and became an agricultural center in the Soviet Union. The severe economic crisis in post-Soviet Georgia heavily affected the town, but a major reconstruction project recently launched by the Government of Georgia and co-funded by several international organizations intends to both address an increasing tourist interest and modernize infrastructure.

=== Armenians of Signagi ===
Armenians once formed the vast majority of the population of Signagi. In 1851, there were 4,267 Armenians and 200 Georgians. By 1916, that majority had narrowed closer to 50-50, with 8,968 Armenians, 8,470 Georgians, and 224 people of other nationalities. In Signagi there were a few Armenian schools, including Surb Sahakyan School, Yerkser School, Lianozyan School, Surb Gevorg Co-ed School, Marinski School, Kaghakayin Yerkdasya School, and the Armenian Women's Sewing School. In 1903, across Signagi region, there were 498 Armenians attending school. There was an Armenian theatre group as well during this period.

There were a number of Armenian churches in Sgnagi which no longer function as Armenian churches.

- Surb Karapet Church. Date of construction unknown, but it appears in records as early as 1788. By the 1840s it must have been in poor condition, because in 1847-1849 it was renovated.
- Surb Gevorg Church (Saint George). Built in 1793. It was closed on January 22, 1924 by the then government and converted into a club. Now it functions as a Georgian Church.
- There are records as early as 1796 of a third church, and a fourth church which there are records from 1818 of a house which had been blessed to function as a church. The house belonged to one Hovhannes Paremuzyantsi. On March 13, 1842 there was an application to build a Surb Astvatsatsin Church on the site but it was not built due to certain complications.

== Geography and climate ==
The town has an area of 2.978 ha with 24.3% being residential. Signagi is approximately 113 km southeast of Tbilisi, the capital of Georgia. Signagi District is adjacent, on the town’s east and southwest sides. Signagi is situated in the eastern foothills of the Gombori Range, a watershed between the Iori and Alazani valleys, in a productive agricultural and fruit-growing region. At an elevation of about 790 m above sea level, the town overlooks the Alazani Valley and faces the Greater Caucasus mountains.

Signagi has a mild Mediterranean-like climate. There are four seasons, with winters being moderately cold while summers can be hot. The highest average temperature is in July at 24.3°C while the lowest average temperature is in January at 0.2°C. Average annual precipitation ranges from 602.1 to 949.7 mm, with the heaviest occurring during the spring months and early summer.

== Culture and attractions ==
Signagi and its environs are home to several historical and cultural monuments and have been specifically protected by the State since 1975. The town is walled with the remnants of 18th-century fortifications. There are two Georgian Orthodox churches in the town itself - one dedicated to St. George and the other to St. Stephen. The venerated Bodbe Monastery is located 2 kilometers from Signagi and is a place of pilgrimage due to its association with St. Nino, the 4th-century apostle of Georgia.

The local Ethnographic and Archaeological Museum dating from the 1950s was upgraded and developed into a modern-standard exhibition the – Signagi Museum – in 2007. Signagi is known as the "City of Love" in Georgia, with many couples visiting it just to get married.

== Notable people ==
- Gevorg Bashinjaghian, painter
- Otar Chiladze, writer
- Tamaz Chiladze, writer
- Dimitri Jorjadze, nobleman, hotel executive and racing driver
- Vano Sarajishvili, singer
- Bidzina Kvernadze, composer

== See also ==
- Kakheti
- Nukriani
- Kingdom of Kartli-Kakheti
