= Anzor Chikhladze =

Russian footballer and coach

Personal information
- Full name: Anzor Irakliyevich Chikhladze
- Date of birth: 18 August 1949 (age 77)
- Height: 1.80 m (5 ft 11 in)
- Position: Striker

Youth career
- FC Torpedo Kutaisi

Senior career*
Years	Team	Apps	(Gls)
1968–1970	FC Torpedo Kutaisi	4	(0)
1971	FC Meshakhte Tkibuli		
1971–1972	FC SKA Rostov-on-Don	45	(10)
1973	FC Shakhtar Donetsk	11	(1)
1974–1975	FC SKA Rostov-on-Don	30	(11)
1976–1978	FC Terek Grozny	85	(25)
1979–1980	FC Spartak Ordzhonikidze	45	(9)
1982	FC Tsement Novorossiysk		

Managerial career
- 1990: FC SKA Rostov-on-Don (assistant)
- 1992: FC SKA Rostov-on-Don (assistant)
- 1993: FC SKA Rostov-on-Don (director)
- 2003–2005: FC Rostov (director)
- 2006–2012: FC SKA Rostov-on-Don (director of sports)
- * Club domestic league appearances and goals

Anzor Irakliyevich Chikhladze (Russian: Анзор Ираклиевич Чихладзе; born 18 August 1949) is a Russian professional football coach and a former player.

== Club career ==
He played 6 seasons in the Soviet Top League for FC Torpedo Kutaisi, FC SKA Rostov-on-Don and FC Shakhtar Donetsk.
