= Sandro Akhmeteli =

Georgian theater director

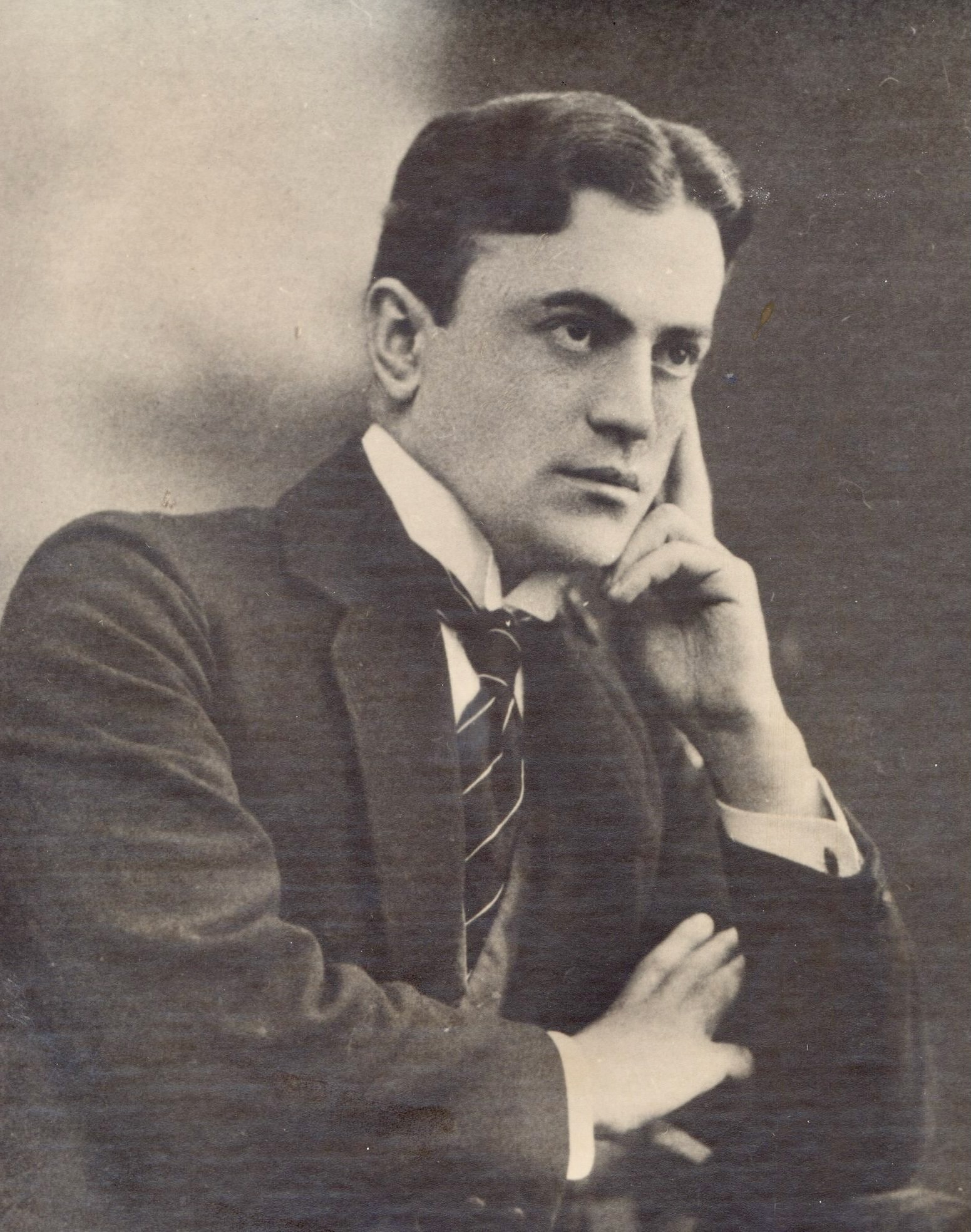
Sandro Akhmeteli

Alexandre Vasilis dze Akhmeteli (Georgian: სანდრო ახმეტელი; April 13, 1886 – June 27, 1937), known professionally as Sandro Akhmeteli, was a Georgian theater director whose innovative conceptions and skill profoundly influenced the evolution of Georgian theater in the Soviet and post-Soviet periods. Commonly regarded as the greatest of all Georgian theater directors, he directed, from 1926 to 1935, the Rustaveli Theater in Tbilisi, Georgia, and transformed it into one of the most successful troupes in the Soviet Union. During Joseph Stalin’s Great Purge, he was arrested on trumped-up charges of being a foreign agent, tortured, and executed.

During the 2024–2025 Georgian protests, which included numerous theaters going on strike to oppose the government's anti-democratic actions, Akhmeteli's work "In Tyrannos" ("Against Tyranny") became one of the protest symbols and was displayed in front of Rustaveli Theater.

== Early career ==
Sandro Akhmeteli was born to the family of a priest in the mountainous village in the province of Kakheti (eastern Georgia, then part of Imperial Russia), whose landscapes and culture heavily influenced the future director’s aesthetic values. Taught at a grammar school by the writer Vasil Barnovi, Akhmeteli acquired a profound knowledge of Georgian and world literature. He was a perfect boxer at the same time. An unfortunate marriage forced him to leave for St. Petersburg where he enrolled into St. Petersburg University to study law (until 1916). However, Akhmeteli spent most of his time in writing theater criticism. In 1915, he produced his first manifesto, condemning the Georgian theater as one that had "to be destroyed, to be made softer, more temperamental, more fiery, emotional, stentorian, bold, heroic."

In 1918, Georgia became independent from Russia, and the new government launched a program aimed at reviving the national theater. Akhemeteli returned to Georgia to lead the younger actors into a coup against the establishment. In 1922, the conspicuous Russia-based Georgian theater director Kote Marjanishvili also returned to Georgia, and the two men began reforming the Tbilisi Rustaveli Theater. Their collaboration was productive, yet uneasy. Restricted and somewhat conformist Marjanishvili found Akhmeteli’s autocratic rule and turbulent character too violent and left the Rustaveli Theater in 1926, leaving Akhemeteli in sole control of the company. Akhmeteli formed his own artistic corporation Duruji (after a river in his native Kakheti) and required all its members to sign a special pledge to "sacrifice their life and future to the will of the corporation and theater".

== Triumph and fall ==
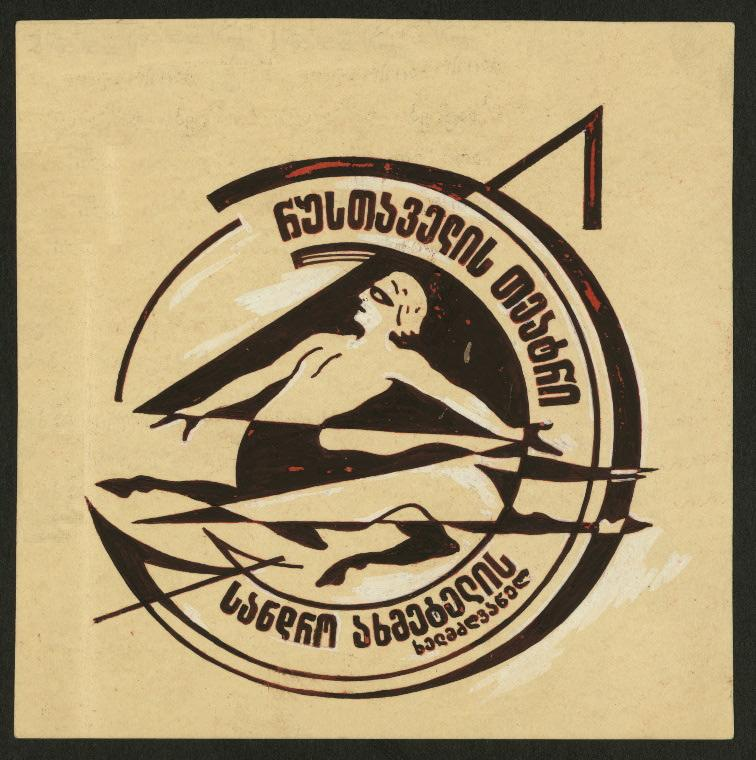
Logo of the Rustaveli Theater under Akhmeteli's directorship

Akhemetli's relations with the recently established Soviet government in Georgia were difficult. Although revolutionary and leftist, his experimentalism and expressionism did not particularly conform to the Bolshevist doctrines. During the anti-Soviet uprising in 1924, he was briefly arrested and questioned about his corporation which was deemed by the secret police to be a conspiracy. He had to disband Duruji under Lavrentiy Beria’s pressure in 1927, but Akhemetli’s resonant successes earned him protection in Moscow. His skills at spectacular massed casts, and choreography garnered an international acclaim. After his masterpiece, Lamara, a play by Grigol Robakidze, won a prize at the 1930 Moscow Drama Olympiad, Akhemetli and his troupe were invited to tour the United States, alarming the Soviet authorities. Following Robakidze’s scandalous defection to Germany later that year, Beria launched a new assault against Akhmeteli. Paradoxically, Lamara continued to be staged to prove the achievements of Soviet theatrical art, although without the name of the playwright on the posters. Akhemeteli produced his last major work in 1933 based on Die Räuber by Schiller (the play is known in Georgia under the name "In Tyrannos") followed by the triumphant tour to Moscow.

Akhemeteli was never able to escape Beria's supervision. Accused of "anti-Soviet activities" and forbidden to tour abroad, Akhemeteli was finally removed from the scene in 1935. He took refuge among his admirers in Moscow, but, in 1937, he was extradited to Tbilisi to be imprisoned with a number of his colleagues on trumped-up charges of espionage for the British and plots to murder Beria and Joseph Stalin. Akhemeteli was subjected, in the presence of Beria, to extensive tortures until rendered mute and paralyzed. He was forced to make confessions but refused to name others and was executed on June 27, 1937. Foreign visitors to his theater were informed he had retired. Akhmeteli was first rehabilitated by the Georgian theater historian Natela Urushadze.

== Legacy ==
During the 2024–2025 Georgian protests, which included numerous theaters going on strike to oppose the government's anti-democratic actions, Akhmeteli's work "In Tyrannos" ("Against Tyranny") became one of the protest symbols and was displayed in front of Rustaveli Theater. Protest participants were inspired by the fact that Akhmeteli scheduled that play and displayed its banner in front of Rustaveli Theater in defiance of the Soviet authorities and their plans to hold festivities in that location. Striking actors promised to restore this as an annual tradition on the 14th of January, which is known in Georgia as the Day of Georgian Theatre.

== Bibliography ==
- (in English) Mikaberidze, Alexander (ed., 2007), Akhmeteli, Sandro. Dictionary of Georgian National Biography.
- (in Russian) Юдина, Екатерина. Ахметели, Александр (Сандро) Васильевич. Энциклопедия Кругосвет.
