= Tsiv-Gombori Range =

Mountain range in Georgia

Tsiv-Gombori
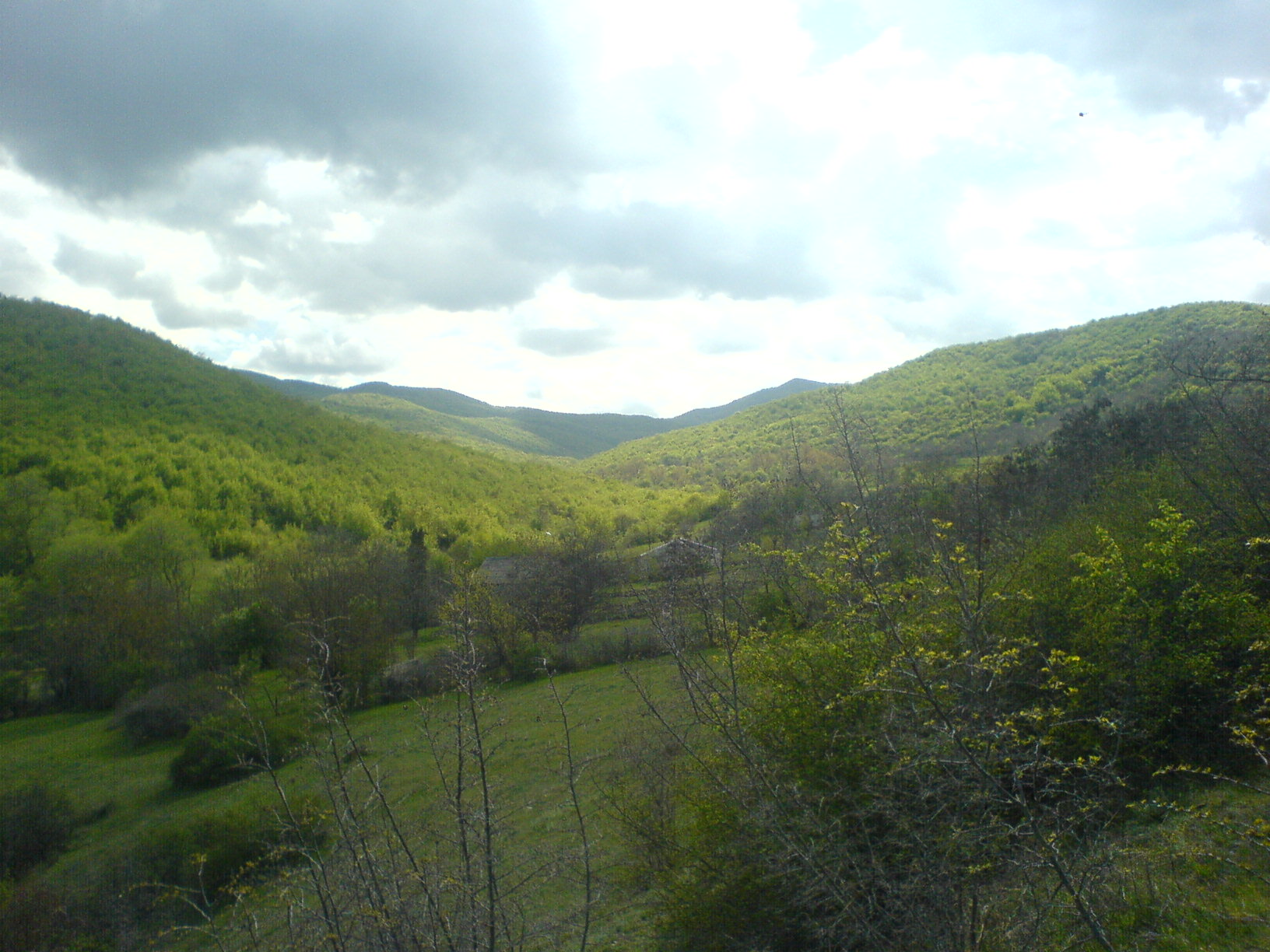
- View of Tsiv-Gombori mountains from Khirsa village

Highest point
- Peak: Mt. Tsivi
- Elevation: 1,990 m (6,530 ft)

Dimensions
- Length: 107 km (66 mi)

Geography
- Location within Georgia Location within Kakheti
- Country: Georgia
- Range coordinates: 41°47′59″N 45°22′4″E
- Parent range: Greater Caucasus

The Tsiv-Gombori (Georgian: ცივ-გომბორის ქედი) or Gombori (გომბორი) is a mountain range in the Georgian section of Greater Caucasus mountains. It is located in the province of Kakheti, eastern Georgia, and stretches to the distance of 107 km, with the highest mountain being at 1,991 m above sea level.

The Gombori range serves as a watershed, separating the Alazani and Iori river valleys, thereby dividing Kakheti into two traditional regions: inner (Shida) and outer (Gare). The slopes of the range are traversed by several smaller river gorges. The Alazani passes through the mountain range affecting the overall climatic conditions in the region. Mariamjvari Strict Nature Reserve is located in the southern side of the range. Both northern and southern slopes are home to pine forests.

== See also ==
- Caucasus Mountains
- Telavi
