= Chachuna Managed Reserve =

Nature reserve in Kakheti, Georgia

- Georgian: ჭაჭუნის აღკვეთილი
- IUCN category IV (habitat/species management area)
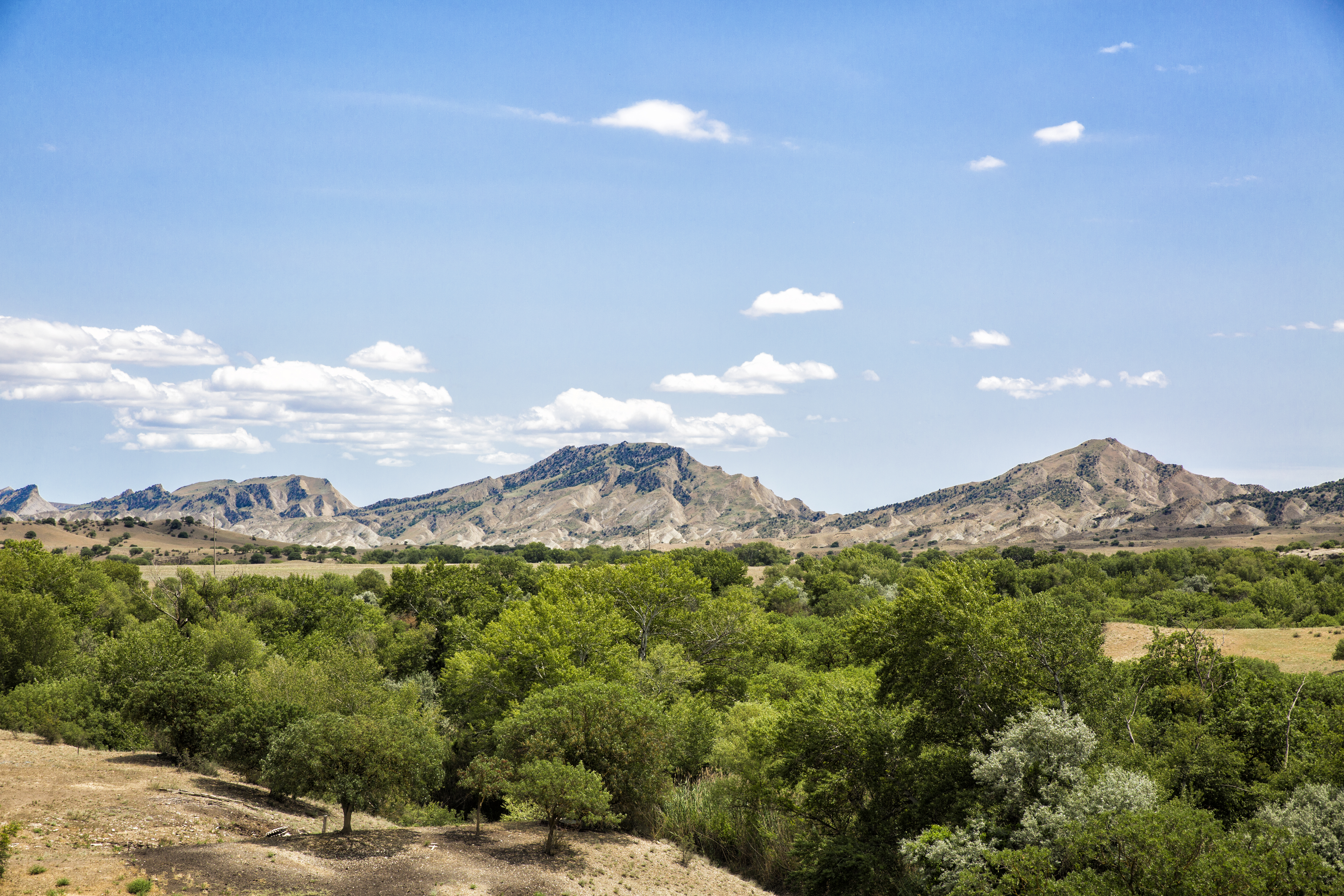
- Chachuna nature reserve

- Location within Georgia Location within Kakheti
- Location: Georgia
- Nearest city: Dedoplistskaro
- Coordinates: 41°17′59″N 45°53′33″E
- Area: 52 km^{2} (20 sq mi)
- Established: 1996
- Governing body: Agency of Protected Areas
- Website: Chachuna Managed Reserve Administration

Chachuna Managed Reserve (Georgian: ჭაჭუნის აღკვეთილი) is a protected area in the Dedoplistskaro Municipality in Kakheti region of Georgia in the south-eastern part of the country near the border with Azerbaijan in floodplains of Iori River. Chachuna Managed Reserve was established in order to protect forests on the banks of the Iori river and Dalis-Mta reservoir and it characteristic arid and semi-arid types of flora and fauna. On the reserve territory there are several bird hides for birdwatching. Chachuni Managed Reserve was established in 1996 mostly on the territory of former Chachuni State Forestry which was in existence since 1965. The Administration of Chachuna Managed Reserve is located in Dedoplistskaro in shared facility with Vashlovani Protected Areas Administration.

== History ==
Chachuna steppe is located in the historic region Kiziki, also known as Kambechovani. This East Georgia territory lies in the basins of Iori and Alazani rivers in the northern part of Mtkvari River basin and presently is within borders of Sighnaghi Municipality and Dedoplistskaro Municipality. The area has many historical monuments such as: the ruins of the medieval Khornabuji Castle, first founded by Vakhtang I of Iberia, 5th-6th century St. Elias Church on Mount Elias, 8th century Khirsa Monastic Complex where is the burial place of the Stephen of Khirsa, one of the Thirteen Assyrian Fathers, 10th - 11th century rock carved temple — Dedoplistskaro Cave Complex, the 11th century domed Church of the Ascention near village Ozaani, the 18th century town of Signagi, built by the Heraclius II of Georgia, and it well preserved defensive wall with 23 towers and 5 gates. Also 18th century domed Church of Seraphoim of Sarov in the village Samreklo. There is also Niko Pirosmanashvili State Museum in the village of Mirzaani and many historic gravesites throughout entire the area.

== Geography ==
Chachuna Managed Reserve along with Iori Managed Reserve and Korugi Managed Reserve protects Iori river valley in Georgia from upstream to the border with Azerbaijan. Iori valley uniquely combines floodplains and wetlands with arid and semi-arid landscapes which benefits diversity of it flora and fauna. The terrain is created by clay hills with steep slopes, the loamy hills, terraces and dry ravines and gorges which are quickly transforming into one another resulting in a beautiful and photogenic landscape. Dark brown, alluvial and black soils as well as alkali soils are characteristic to the Chachuna Reserve.

== Geology ==
Geologically Chachuna Managed Nature Reserve is located within Transcaucasian intermountain region, in the Molasse basin, entirely within the intermountain depression of the Mtkvari River and is filled in with Molasse sediments. In Chachuna steppe one can find sands, sandstones, clay with characteristic layers of volcanic ash and limestone conglomerates. In the vicinity of reserve there are limestone sources of ceramic flux and lime as well as limestone outcrops of bitumen composition and the oil sands forming small lakes. This area is also known for its formula of cattle and millet limestone.

== Climate ==
Chachuna reserve has a warm mild continental climate in large part due to vast marsh on the banks of the Iori river, in total marsh occupies 24 hectares of the reserve territory. The average temperature in January is -2.5 °C, and in July it is +22 °C in the shadow.

== Flora ==
The Chachuni Managed Reserve has quite diverse flora despite the modest size of its territory. On the river Iori, the tugay floodplains are common, and various types of arid light forests, semi-desert and steppe vegetation can be found in the surrounding hills. The most common plant is an aspen (Populus tremula). On floodplains also grows a few long-stalk oak (Quercus longipes), wild pistachio tree (Pistacia mutica) and white willow (Salix alba). Endemic light arid forests are created by specimens of wild pistachio tree (Pistacia mutica), varieties of juniper trees (Juniperus oxycedrus, Juniperus foetidissima, and Juniperus polycarpos), hawthorn, oak, pear and Caucasian hackberry (Celtis glabrata). On the river banks and in the swamped areas there are reeds (Phragmites communis), Giant reeds (Arundo donax) as well as the rare and threatened species Georgian iris (Iris iberica) and Eichlerian tulip (Tulipa eichleri).

== Fauna ==
The fauna of Chachuna steppe is very diverse. Insects found in great numbers are grasshoppers. Arachnids are represented by Sun spiders (Solifugae) and Scorpions and are also widespread.

Reptiles such as Greek Tortoise (Testudo graeca) and very poisonous Levantine viper or Caucasian viper locally known as Gurza (Macrovipera lebetina) are also found in reserve.

There are 82 species of birds in Nature Reserve, including 10 bird species in the Red List of Georgia. Among well represented species are common wood pigeon (Columba palumbus), European turtle dove (Streptopelia turtur), Eurasian sparrowhawk (Accipiter nisus), northern goshawk (Accipiter gentilis), Magpie, chukar partridge(Alectoris chukar) and Eastern imperial eagle (Aquila heliaca). Exotic Griffon Vulture and Egyptian Vulture made nests on limestone cliffs and the Cinereous Vulture has it nests on juniper trees. The beautiful bird Black francolin is also widespread in this area.

Numerous mammals include species of rodents, jackal, Red fox (Vulpes vulpes), hare (Lepus europaeus), jungle cat (Felis chaus), lynx (Lynx lynx), badger (Meles meles) and Wild boar (Sus scrofa). Rare in this area striped hyenas (Hyaena hyaena) possibly still inhabit Chachuna Nature Reserve.

In 2011 the IRI's Palaeontological Expedition found samples of fossil fauna in the territory of Vashlovani and Chachuna Nature Reserves.

== See also ==
- Iori River
- Iori Managed Reserve
- Korugi Managed Reserve
- Vashlovani Strict Nature Reserve
