= Kasristskali =

Kasristskali კასრისწყალი

- Location within Georgia Location within Kakheti
- Coordinates: 41°17′15″N 46°27′56″E
- Country: (Georgia (country)) Georgia
- Mkhare: Kakheti
- Municipality: Akhmeta
- Elevation: 524 m (1,719 ft)

Population (2024)
  - Total: 214
- Time zone: UTC+4 (Georgian Time)

Kasristskali (Georgian: კასრისწყალი) is a village in the Akhmeta Municipality of Kakheti, Georgia. It is located within the Shiraki Plain, and serves as the gateway to the Vashlovani Nature Reserve. The village, alongside the surrounding area, is in fact part of Akhmeta Municipality, despite being almost fully enclosed by the Dedoplistskaro Municipality. Until 1966, the village was known as El Dari.

== See also ==
- Kakheti
- Vashlovani Strict Nature Reserve
