= Mirzaani =

Mirzaani მირზაანი
- Village
- Mirzaani Church

- Location in Georgia
- Coordinates: 41.564°N 45.969°E
- Country: Georgia (country)
- Municipality: Dedoplistsqaro Municipality
- Region: Kakheti

Population (2014)
  - Total: 433
- Time zone: UTC+4 (Georgian Time)

Mirzaani (Georgian: მირზაანი) is a village in Georgia. It is located in Dedoplistsqaro Municipality, 15 kilometers from Dedoplistsqaro. Elevation: 750 meters. According to the 2014 census, 433 people lived in the village, the majority of whom are Georgians with a small Azeri minority.

== Geography ==
The climate of the village is humid subtropical, with relatively cold winters and long warm summers. The average annual temperature is 10.1 degrees Celsius. The average January temperature is -1.5 degrees; 21.7 degrees in August. The absolute minimum temperature is -26 degrees, absolute maximum is +35 degrees. The amount of precipitation is 650 mm per year.

== Culture ==
Georgian self-taught artist Niko Pirosmani (1862-1918) was born in Mirzaani. His house-museum is in the village, as is a monument designed by Vazha Mikaberidze. Every October, the village hosts a traditional celebration “Pirosmanoba” (ფიროსმანობა), dedicated to the artist.

== See also ==
- Didnauri
- Vashlovani National Park
