= Takhti-Tepha Natural Monument =

- IUCN category III (natural monument or feature)
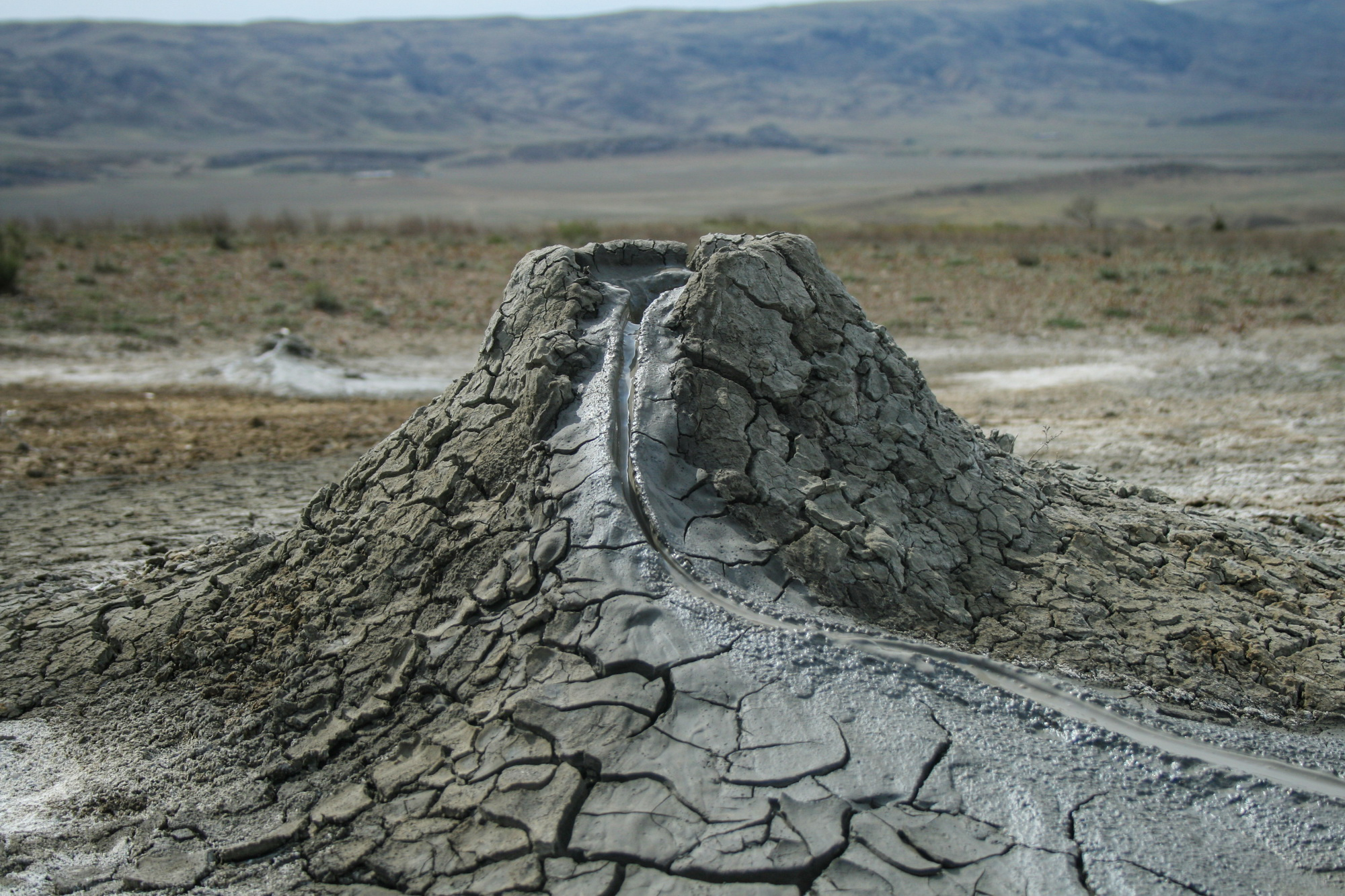
- Takhti-Tepha mud volcano.

- Location within Georgia Location within Kakheti
- Location: Georgia
- Nearest city: Dedoplistsqaro
- Coordinates: 41°14.741′N 45°50.617′E
- Area: 0.1 km^{2} (0.039 sq mi)
- Governing body: Agency of Protected Areas
- Website: Takhti-Tepha Natural Monument

Takhti-Tepha Natural Monument (Georgian: ტახტი-თეფას ბუნების ძეგლი) is a landform created by the eruption of mud, slurries, water and gases in proximity of Takhti-Tepha mountain range. This mud volcano is located on plane, south of Dali water reservoir, at 620 m above sea level in Dedoplistsqaro Municipality, Georgia and incorporated in Vashlovani Protected Areas. Mud craters, along with small open vents are constantly active, erupting mud, oil and gas. The length of the pedestrian path across the Takhti-Tepha Natural Monument is 0.5 km. The total area of the natural monument is 9.7 ha. The largest mud cater is 3,5-4 m in diameter. The landscape is built of sandstones and clays.

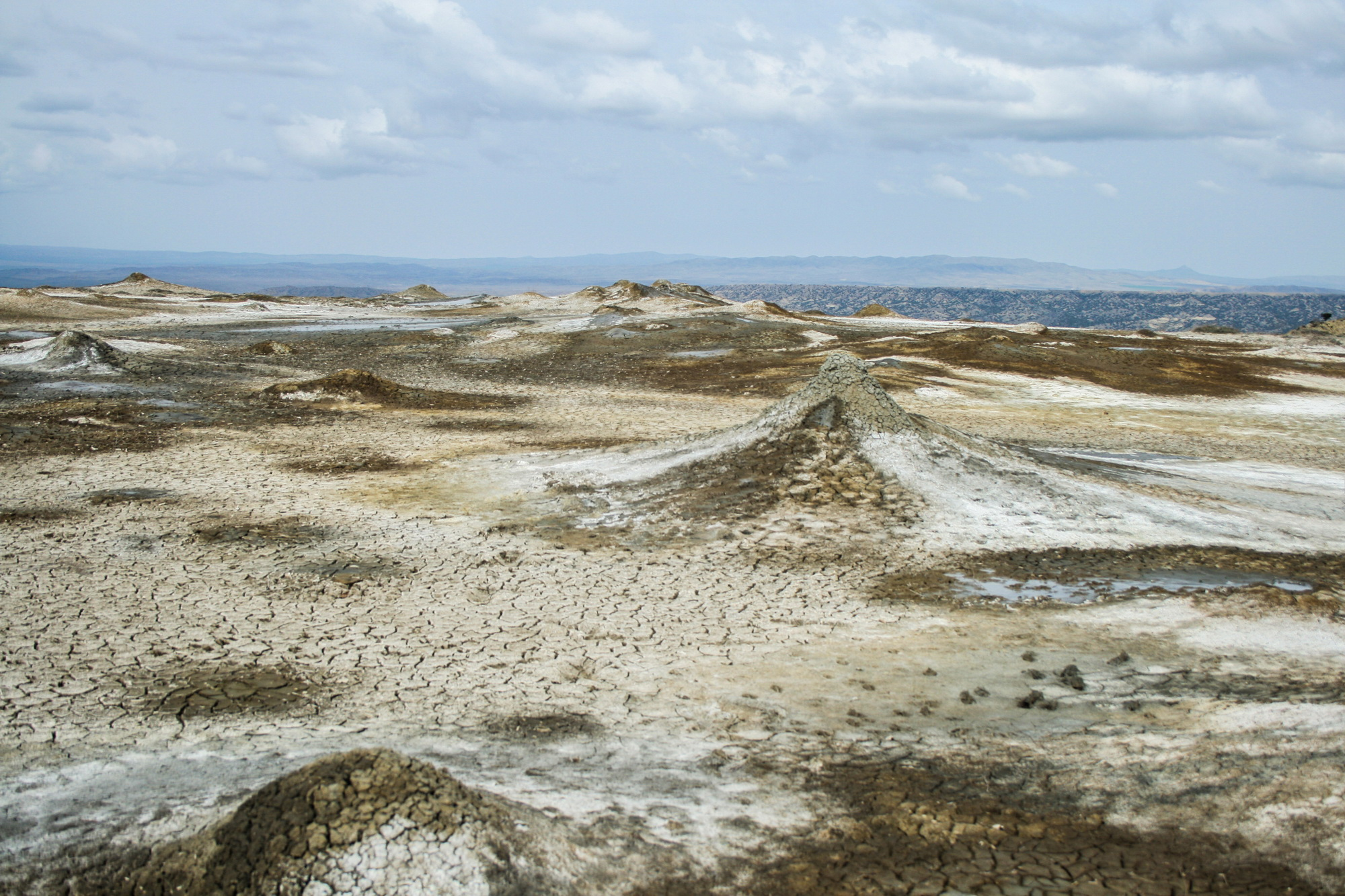
View of bubbling mud craters.

== See also ==
- Vashlovani National Park
