= Khornabuji =

Khornabuji ხორნაბუჯი
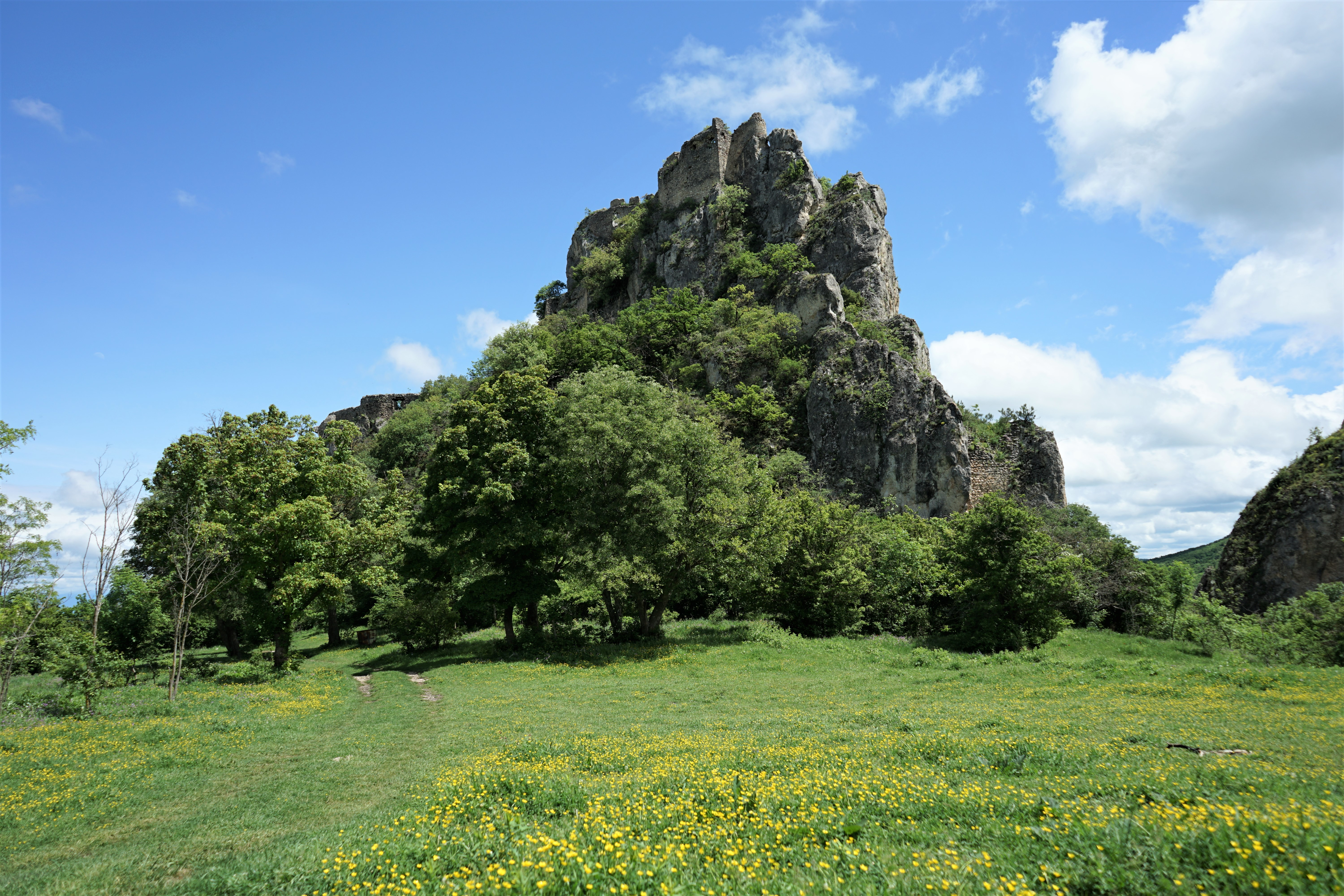

- Location within Georgia Location within Kakheti
- Coordinates: 41°30′20″N 46°08′18″E
- Country: (Georgia (country)) Georgia
- Mkhare: Kakheti
- Municipality: Sighnaghi
- Elevation: 356 m (1,168 ft)

Population (2024)
  - Total: 269
- Time zone: UTC+4 (Georgian Time)

Khornabuji (Georgian: ხორნაბუჯი) is a village in Sighnaghi Municipality, Georgia with a population of 269. The village is situated at the foot of the Gombori mountain range, with the famous Khornabuji Castle directly south, in-between the village itself and the larger Dedoplistskaro.

== History ==
=== Antiquity ===
The Khornabuji Fortress is much older than Khornabuji itself, believed to have been founded as a military outpost around the end of the 1st millennium BC, making it one of the oldest fortresses in Georgia. The first mention of the Khornabuji Fortress appears in the 5th century, where King Vakhtang I appointed a bishop to the castle, who would report to the Svetitskhoveli Cathedral in Mtshkheta, the former capital of the Kingdom of Iberia. There was also a town located in the plains where modern-day Khornabuji occupies, which was one of the largest cities in Kakheti, and the largest in the Kambechovani region.

After the brief Sasanian invasion in 484 AD, the majority of the town was destroyed, with much of the population being forcibly relocated to various areas across Persia. Due to this invasion, the Mihranid dynasty of Albania had to swear fealty to the Persians and ruled as a hereditary duke of Kakheti and the surrounding region, exerting very little power over the region and acting more as a figurehead than an actual leader. That status quo was about to change, as later in the 7th century some time between 637 and 642, Adarnase I of the Principality of Iberia joined his forces with Javanshir, successfully overthrowing Persian rule from the area. This, however, was all futile as only a few years later in 645, the Mihranid dynasty joined a war against the Rashidun Caliphate alongside the Sassanids, who would eventually lose the war, with the Albanians being forced to swear suzerainty to the Rashiduns and later the Umayyad Caliphate.

Islamic rule would only get more powerful in parts of Georgia over the next century, even after the Abbasid Caliphate took over, as the local population grew complacent and Khornabuji grew to become a larger town, right in the centre of a vital trade route. By the mid-9th century AD, Khornabuji and the surrounding area was granted to the Iberians as punishment to Iberia for disobedience, becoming part of Kakheti, and permanently severing from Albania, who would soon after cease to exist, and become the province of Arminiyah.

During the reign of prince Gabriel of Kakheti, the area fell into revolt, allied with the Emirate of Tbilisi, eventually breaking free from Islamic rule, where it would retain it sovereignty until the unification between itself and Hereti in 1014.

=== Kingdom of Georgia ===
After the unification of Hereti and Kakheti, Khornabuji would continue to be held by Georgian dynasties and kingdoms almost uninterrupted until the Qajar invasion of 1795. The Kingdom of Georgia absorbed the Kingdom of Kakheti-Hereti in 1104, where Khornabuji's status waned as an important town in Kakheti. In the late 12th century, Queen Tamar ordered the construction of the modern castle that is Khornabuji Fortress, as well as many other projects around the town, revitalising the local economy.

In 1264, the Mongol Empire invaded Kakheti, pillaging and ultimately destroying the first town of Khornabuji, as well as the majority of the ancient fortress. The town would never recover from this, with the majority of its population moving to the much safer Sighnaghi, ending Khornabuji's hayday as a market town.

Only in the late 18th century was the ancient fortress of Khornabuji rebuilt by Erkele II, where the town of Khornabuji was entirely neglected, only leaving a small group of houses which would later become the modern village of Khornabuji.

=== Modern History ===
After the brief Persian conquest of Georgia, the Russian Empire decided to invade the Caucasus, going after both Persia and the Ottoman Empire. Russia acquired Kakheti and the rest of Georgia via the Russo-Persian War of 1804, where Persia was forced to concede its northern frontier through the Treaty of Gulistan. After this, Russia would end up controlling Khornabuji until their declaration of independence in 1918.

== Geography ==
Khornabuji sits at the northeastern edge of the Gombori mountain range which spans over 100 kilometres across Kakheti. Just south of the town is the historic Khornabuji Fortress, a major tourist spot. The fortress itself lies on an important trade route that connected the Alazani and Lori rivers, which thus connect to Persia and the rest of West Asia. Khornabuji is north of the town of Dedoplistsqaro, in the neighbouring municipality of which it is the namesake.

== Demographics ==
According to the 2024 Georgian census, Khornabuji had a population of 269, with 130 being male and the other 139 being female.

== Climate ==
Climate data for Khornabuji (elev. 356m) (1991–2020)
Month	Jan	Feb	Mar	Apr	May	Jun	Jul	Aug	Sep	Oct	Nov	Dec	Year
Record high °C (°F)	19.1 (66.4)	19.4 (66.9)	25.6 (78.1)	30.6 (87.1)	32.4 (90.3)	39.3 (102.7)	40.9 (105.6)	40.8 (105.4)	36.0 (96.8)	31.6 (88.9)	23.2 (73.8)	18.6 (65.5)	40.9 (105.6)
Mean daily maximum °C (°F)	4.9 (40.8)	6.1 (43.0)	10.6 (51.1)	15.9 (60.6)	21.0 (69.8)	26.8 (80.2)	29.8 (85.6)	29.7 (85.5)	24.5 (76.1)	18.1 (64.6)	11.0 (51.8)	7.2 (45.0)	17.1 (62.8)
Mean daily minimum °C (°F)	−2.8 (27.0)	−2.2 (28.0)	1.1 (34.0)	5.8 (42.4)	10.5 (50.9)	15.7 (60.3)	18.4 (65.1)	18.2 (64.8)	13.8 (56.8)	8.6 (47.5)	2.8 (37.0)	−1.3 (29.7)	7.4 (45.3)
Record low °C (°F)	−13.2 (8.2)	−14.8 (5.4)	−8.8 (16.2)	−6.9 (19.6)	1.0 (33.8)	6.3 (43.3)	9.9 (49.8)	9.3 (48.7)	3.3 (37.9)	−1.4 (29.5)	−7.4 (18.7)	−12.6 (9.3)	−14.8 (5.4)
Average precipitation mm (inches)	29.8 (1.17)	28.2 (1.11)	47.7 (1.88)	63.9 (2.52)	91.9 (3.62)	75.3 (2.96)	51.0 (2.01)	36.0 (1.42)	56.7 (2.23)	50.9 (2.00)	38.5 (1.52)	21.1 (0.83)	591 (23.3)
Average precipitation days (≥ 1.0 mm)	10.4	9.9	14.3	16.9	21.6	15	10.9	7.8	10.2	12.1	10.4	7.8	147.3
Source: NOAA

== See also ==
- Kakheti
- Signagi
- Kingdom of Kakheti
- Khornabuji Castle
