= Artsivi Gorge Natural Monument =

Artsivi (Eagle) Gorge Natural Monument
- IUCN category III (natural monument or feature)
- Hiking in Eagle canyon.

- Location within Georgia Location within Kakheti
- Location: Georgia
- Nearest city: Dedoplistsqaro
- Coordinates: 41°29′15.85″N 46°05′39.67″E
- Area: 1.74 km^{2} (0.67 sq mi)
- Established: 1935
- Governing body: Agency of Protected Areas
- Website: Artsivi (Eagle) Gorge Natural Monument

Artsivi (Eagle) Gorge Natural Monument (Georgian: არწივის ხეობა) consists of two sites: limestone rock canyon and nearby forested area, where in the 5th century Khornabuji fortress was built. Sites are located in Dedoplistsqaro Municipality, Georgia and incorporated in Vashlovani Protected Areas.

Eagle gorge is located 2 km from the city of Dedoplistsqaro on the limestone rock massive. Here is the only local endemic species of Georgia - Campanula kachetica, rare species of Globularia trichosantha, Galium pedemontanum and rare oriental thuja (Biota orientalis), which is not available in any other corner of Georgia. Eagle gorge is also distinguished by more than sixty varieties birds, including nesting rare species of birds - black stork and Griffon vulture. Eagle canyon is an ideal place for birdwatching.

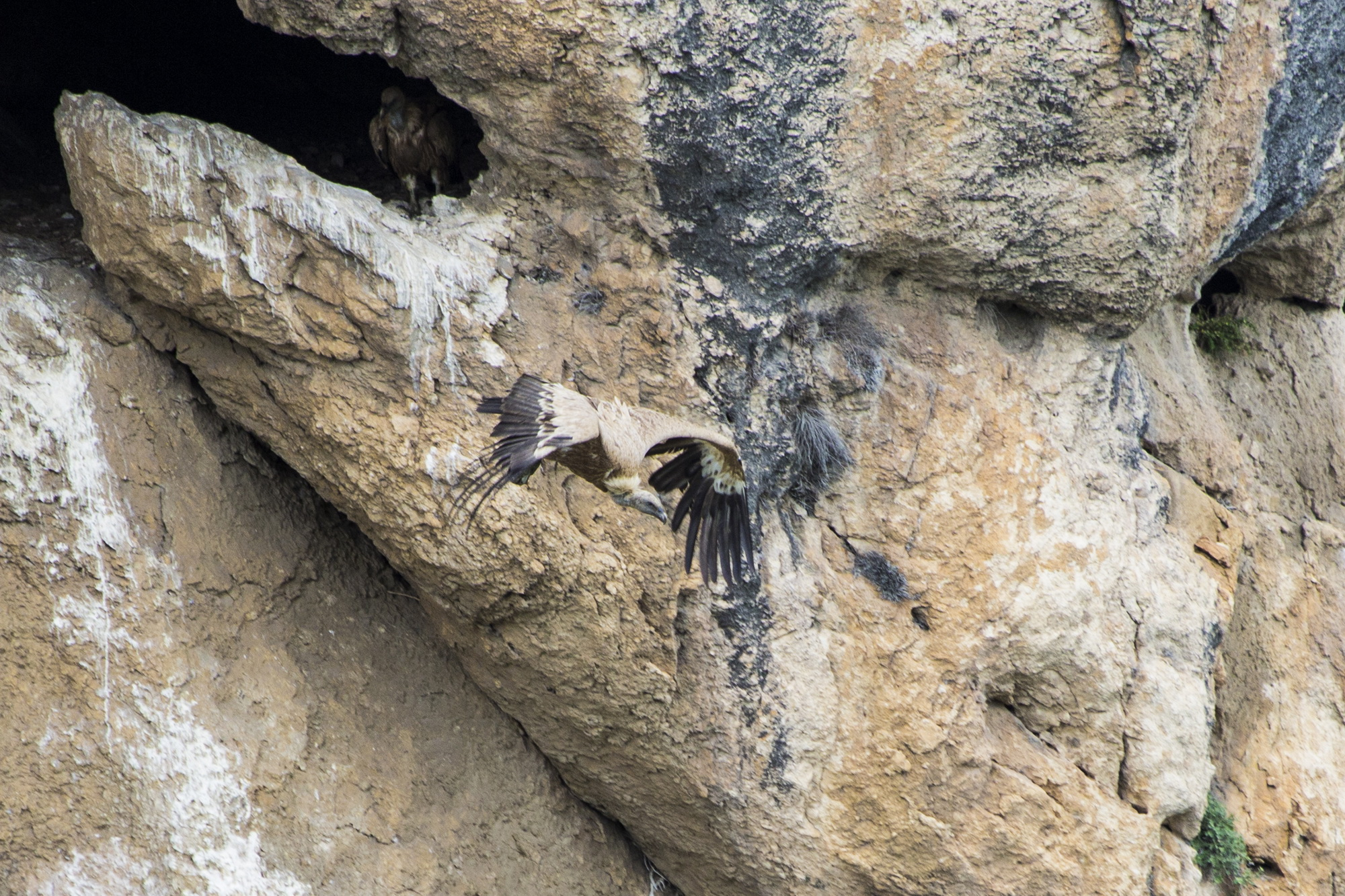
Birdwatching in Eagle canyon.

== See also ==
- List of natural monuments of Georgia
- Khornabuji Castle
