= Shiraki Plain =

Coordinates: 41.3333°N 46.4167°E

Shiraki Plain on the physical map of Georgia

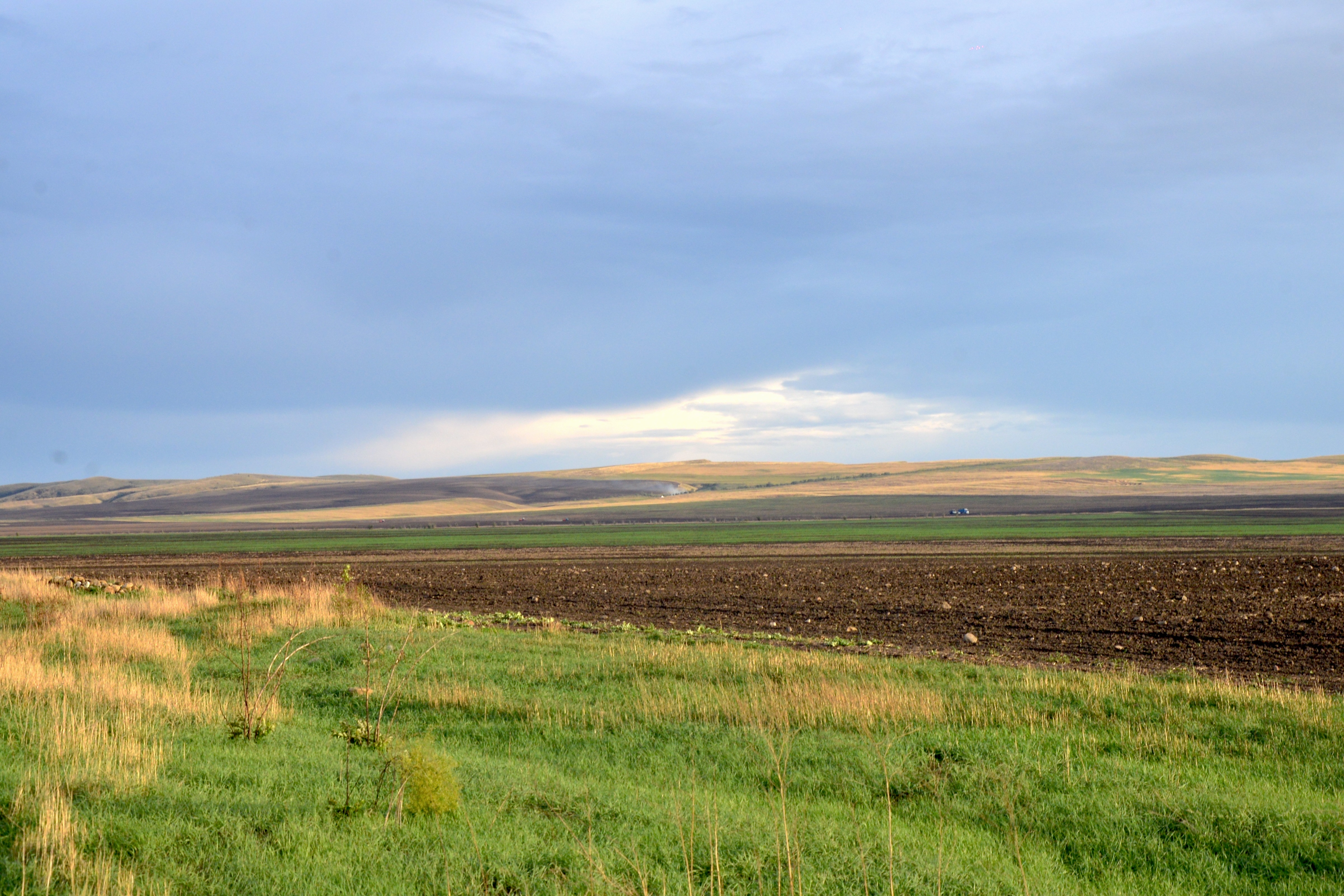
A portion of the Shiraki Plain, showing its low hilled southern edge.

The Shiraki (Georgian: შირაქის ვაკე, širakis vaḳe) is a plain on the Iori Plateau in Georgia, an interfluve between the river valleys of the Iori in the south and the Alazani in the north; its steep slopes in the east border on the Mingachevir reservoir in Azerbaijan, and in the west it is limited by the Tsiv-Gombori Range.

The Shiraki Plain consists of steppes, where grain crops are cultivated and livestock is grazed in the winter. The region also has some petroleum deposits and prehistoric archaeological sites.

== Geography ==
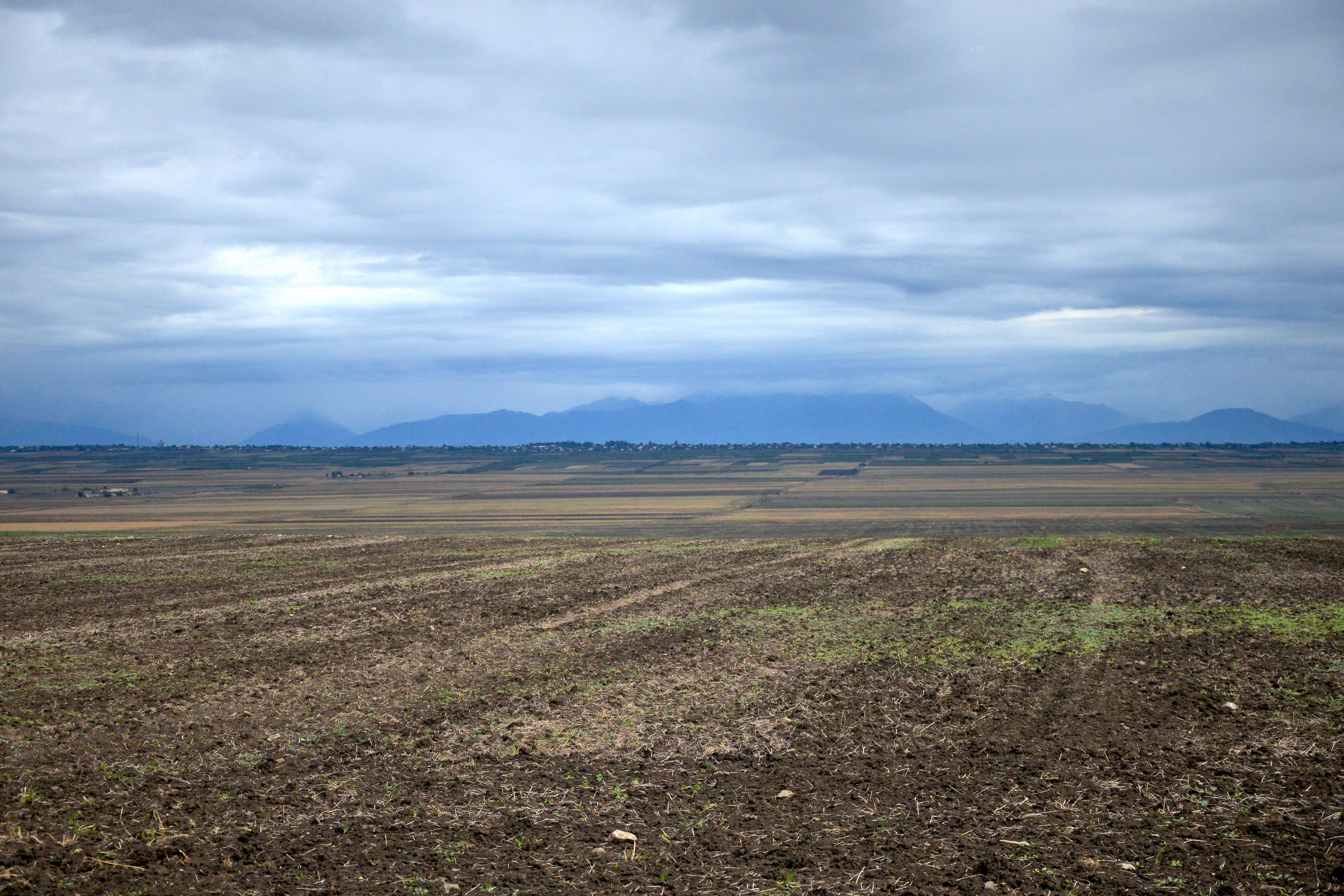
View over Shiraki Plain with the Greater Caucasus and the village Arkhiloskalo on the horizon.

The Shiraki is a flat lowland area at the elevation of 500 metres (1,600 ft) to 700 metres (2,300 ft) above sea level, 35 kilometres (22 mi) in length and 15 kilometres (9.3 mi) in width. It is a syncline formation, with Quaternary deposits filling the folds and rich in artesian waters. The climate in the area is moderate continental, with the average annual temperature of 10°C, -3.8°C in January and 22.8°C in July. The annual precipitation is low and unevenly distributed, with the average of 490 mm. The normal flora of the Shiraki Plain is that of a steppe. Currently, most of the area is used as farmlands, primarily for cereals, and is known as Georgia's breadbasket.

The Shiraki Plain is sometimes divided into the northern Greater Shiraki (დიდი შირაქის ვაკე, didi shirak'is vake) and southern Lesser Shiraki (პატარა შირაქის ვაკე, patara shirak'is vake), separated by a low, steep ridge. Geographically, the plain falls within the boundaries of the Dedoplistsqaro Municipality in Georgia's easternmost region of Kakheti and adjoins the Vashlovani National Park. While the park is administered by the Dedoplistsqaro Municipality, the Shiraki's largest portion is under the jurisdiction of the Akhmeta Municipality, not contiguous with the Shiraki plain and located further north in Kakheti. This situation reflects the fact that the Shiraki steppe has been used, since the 17th century, as winter pastures by shepherds from Akhmeta's Tush community, traditionally engaged in transhumant lifestyle of sheep farming. Residential infrastructure is largely absent on the pastures. There are only livestock farms. The whole distance from the areas of the Tush summertime residence to the Shiraki winter pastures is about 200 kilometres (120 mi) and involves crossing of Georgia's highest pass, the Abano, at 2,960 metres (9,710 ft) above sea level.

=== Oil deposits ===
The steppe has some oil deposits, which were found in the 1860s, when Georgia was part of the Russian Empire. Oil sources belonged to the government, which granted lease to individuals. Oil production in the Shiraki region was taken over by the German company Siemens & Halske, which gave it up in 1883, as the Baku oil had supplanted the Shiraki oil. In the 1930s, oil production was resumed at small low-depth drilled wells in Shiraki, but went in dramatic decline since 1983.

== History ==
The Shiraki Plain is populated by several archaeological sites. As archaeological and palynological studies indicate the climate in the region was less arid in the prehistoric era; the territory was covered by forests and continuously inhabited until the end of the 7th century BC, when the human settlement in the area was abruptly and completely terminated, apparently, as a result of ecological changes as well as nomadic raids. In 2014, a satellite survey and subsequent archaeological digs at Didnauri in the Shiraki croplands revealed a large Late Bronze Age site, with massive defensive walls and warrior tombs.

Later human activity in the Shiraki steppe was related to transhumance. It emerged in the early 17th century, when the Tush highlanders were granted the grazing rights in Shiraki in recognition of their military service to the kings of Kakheti against the Safavid Iran. A stone inscription from that period as well as the Eldari fort built by the Tush testifies to their presence in the area. The Tush control of the pastures was challenged by the neighboring mountaineers of Dagestan, leading to mutual raids. With the Russian annexation of Georgia in the early 19th century, access of the Tush shepherds to the Shiraki plots became more secure and continues to this day.

Around 1950, the Soviet government constructed a military airbase known as Greater Shiraki (Russian: Большие Шираки, Bol'shiye Shiraki) in the steppe. It was home to the 168th Guards Fighter Aviation Regiment (Russian: 168-й гвардейский истребительный авиационный Краснознамённый полк), which took part in the Soviet–Afghan War and returned to Georgia in 1989. After the collapse of the Soviet Union, the remaining 30 Su-24 attack aircraft were relocated to Russia by June 1992 and the Greater Shiraki airfield was transferred to a now independent Georgia by October 1992. The airfield was never systematically used by the Georgian military and its infrastructure went in decay. By 2006, the territory of the former air base had been privatized. During the Russo-Georgian War, on 11 August 2008, the Russian jets dropped bombs on the abandoned Shiraki airfield.
