= Arboshiki =

Arboshiki არბოშიკი

- Location within Georgia
- Coordinates: 41°33′04″N 45°57′49″E
- Country: Georgia
- Region: Kakheti
- Municipality: Dedoplistsqaro
- Elevation: 600 m (2,000 ft)

Population (2014)
  - Total: 1.138
- Time zone: UTC+4 (Georgian Time)

Arboshiki (Georgian: არბოშიკი) is a village in Dedoplistsqaro Municipality, Kakheti region, Georgia. It is located 23 km of Dedoplistsqaro, at an altitude of about 600 m. The population was 1,138 inhabitants in 2014. There are many architectural and archaeological monument. Agriculture is the main part of Arboshiki's economy. The village is also popular place among archaeologists.
