= Ozaani =

Ozaani ოზაანი
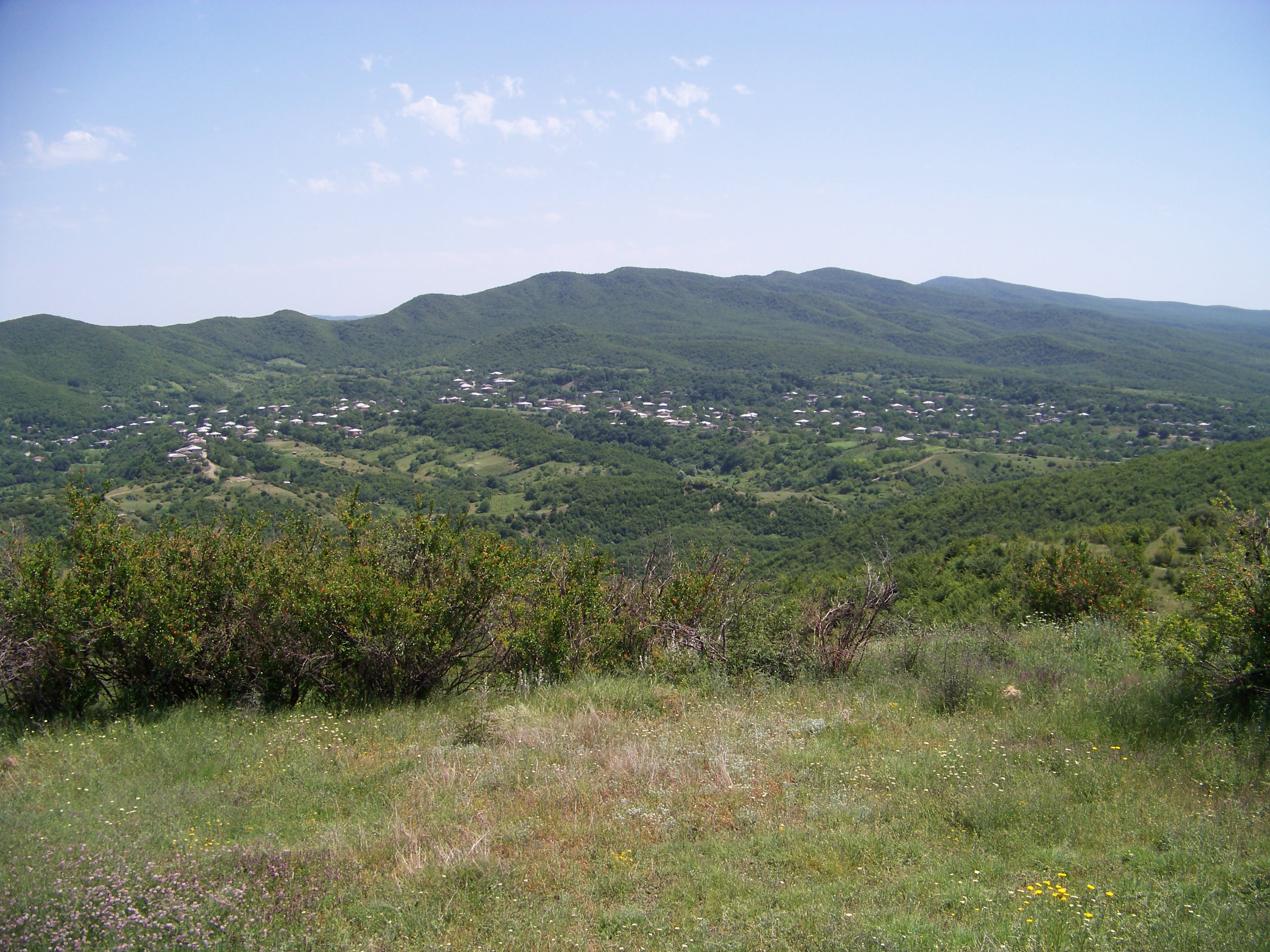

- Location within Georgia
- Coordinates: 41°32′59″N 45°59′54″E
- Country: Georgia
- Region: Kakheti
- Municipality: Dedoplistsqaro
- Elevation: 420 m (1,380 ft)

Population (2014)
  - Total: 833
- Time zone: UTC+4 (Georgian Time)

Ozaani (Georgian: ოზაანი) is a village in Dedoplistsqaro Municipality, Kakheti region, Georgia. The population was 833 inhabitants in 2014. It is located south-eastern slopes of Gombori Range, at 420 m above sea level, 18 km of Dedoplistsqaro. Georgian painter Niko Pirosmani often vissited in Ozaani. There are many architectural and archaeological monument, including Ozaani's Church of the Ascension.
