= Mariamjvari Strict Nature Reserve =

Protected nature area in Georgia (country)

- IUCN category Ia (strict nature reserve)
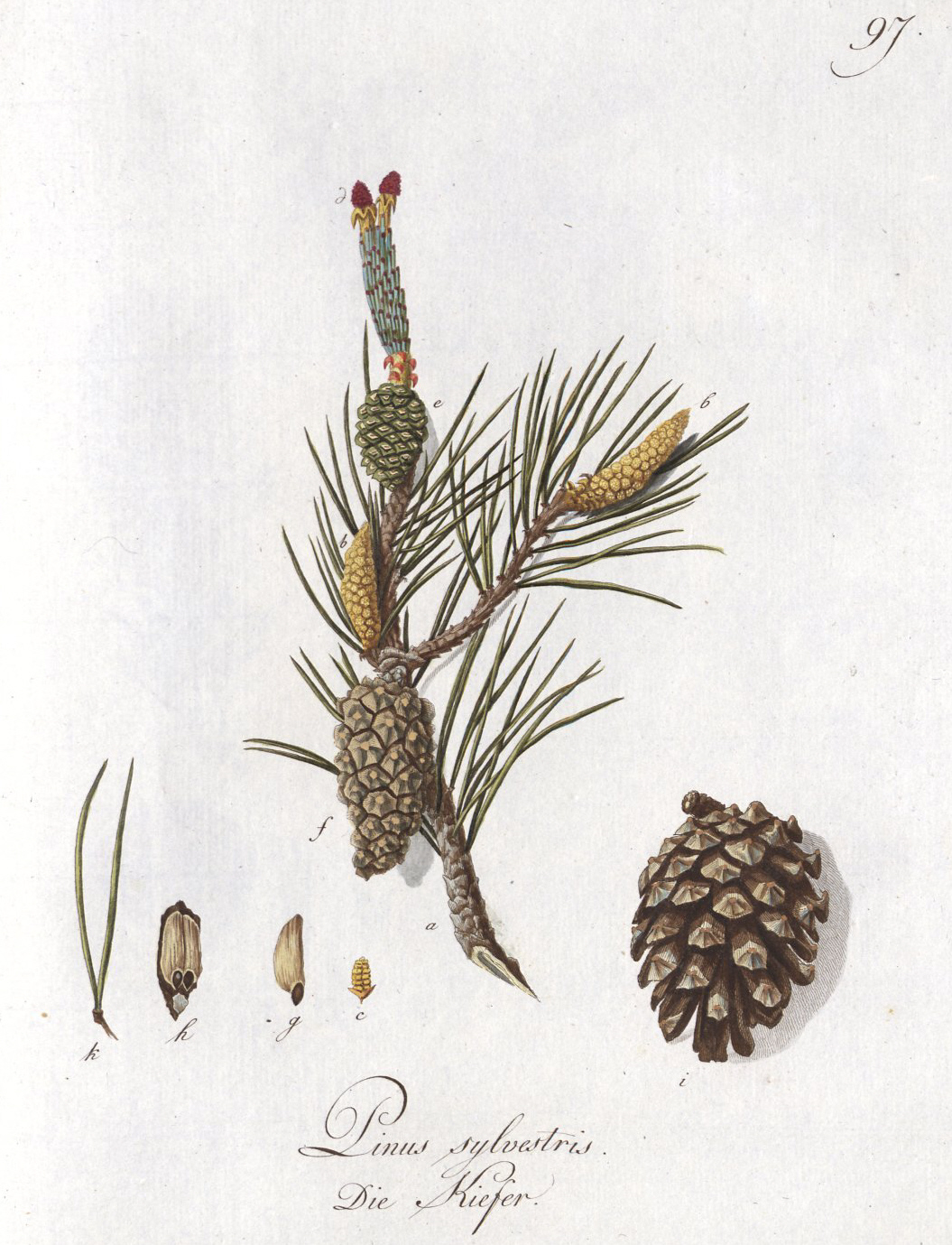
- Pinus sylvestris or Sosnowskyi pine

- Location within Georgia Location within Kakheti
- Location: Georgia
- Nearest city: Sagarejo
- Coordinates: 41°46′07″N 45°22′38″E
- Area: 18.41 km^{2} (7.11 sq mi)
- Established: 1935
- Governing body: Agency of Protected Areas
- Website: Mariamjvari Protected Areas

Mariamjvari Strict Nature Reserve (Georgian: მარიამჯვრის სახელმწიფო ნაკრძალი) is a protected area in Sagarejo Municipality, Kakheti region of Georgia on the southern slopes of Cold-Gombori Range. The reserve's territory is located in Lori gorge and has a narrow line with an uneven shape running north-west to south-east.

== History ==
Mariamjvari Nature Reserve was founded in 1935 with the purpose of preserving untouched landscapes of relic Sosnowskyi pine (Pinus sosnowskyi). as well to preserve the unique floodplains of the area.

Presently Mariamjvari Strict Nature Reserve is part of Georgia's Protected Areas which also includes Korugi Managed Reserve and Iori Managed Reserve.

== Flora ==
Most of the reserve landscape is covered in forest. It is represented by a variety of forms due to tree polymorphism. The main species of the forest are long stalked oak, poplar, meadow elm, and willow.

The floodplain of the forest has much more importance due to the biodiversity of the area Things such has sagebrush, akaki, junipers, nitria. as well has pomegranate, jasmine, barberry and others, are common in the floodplains of the area.

- Scots pine
