= Korugi Managed Reserve =

Protected nature area in Georgia

- Georgian: ყორუღი
- IUCN category IV (habitat/species management area)
- Floodplain of Iori river

- Location within Georgia Location within Kakheti
- Location: Georgia
- Nearest city: Sagarejo
- Coordinates: 41°38′32″N 45°27′11″E
- Area: 20.68 km^{2} (7.98 sq mi)
- Established: 1996
- Governing body: Agency of Protected Areas
- Website: Mariamjvari Strict Nature Reserve Administration

Korugi Managed Reserve (Georgian: ყორუღის აღკვეთილი) also known as Korughi Managed Reserve is a protected area in the Sagarejo Municipality in the Kakheti region of Georgia on the Iori Plateau near the border with Azerbaijan.

The reserve is part of Georgia's Protected Areas which also includes Mariamjvari Strict Nature Reserve and Iori Managed Reserve.

Korugi Managed Reserve includes parts of the Iori river valley. It borders the Iori Managed Reserve which covers the area downstream of the Iori river.

Korugi Managed Reserve was established to protect the floodplain forest of the Iori river.

== History and cultural attractions ==
Korughi nature reserve is mentioned in the Law Book (1709) of King Vakhtang VI as "the place for hunting", and cutting trees and visiting the place was prohibited. As with other mountainous regions the place was granted the status of "Holy Forest" and protected from disturbance by appointed guardsmen.

Archeological sites with Eneolithic-Early Bronze Age ruins, crypts of Middle Bronze Age and remains dating to the Late Bronze Age and Early Iron Age have been located near Korugi Managed Reserve. The Iori Plateau has several early monasteries, including David Gareja monastery complex.

== See also ==
- Iori (river)
