= Iori Managed Reserve =

Protected nature area in Georgia

- Georgian: ივრის აღკვეთილი
- IUCN category IV (habitat/species management area)
- Iori river

- Location within Georgia Location within Kakheti
- Location: Georgia
- Coordinates: 41°22′51.6″N 45°44′01.5″E
- Area: 13.36 km^{2} (5.16 sq mi)
- Established: 1996
- Governing body: Agency of Protected Areas
- Website: Mariamjvari Strict Nature Reserve Administration

Iori Managed Reserve (Georgian: ივრის აღკვეთილი) is a protected area in the Signagi Municipality in Kakheti region of Georgia near the border with Azerbaijan.

Iori Managed Reserve is part of Georgia's Protected Areas which also includes Mariamjvari Strict Nature Reserve and Korugi Managed Reserve.

Iori Managed Reserve includes the parts of the Iori river valley. It borders the Korugi Managed Reserve which covers the upstream of Iori river.

Iori Managed Reserve was established in order to protect tugay forest of the Iori river.

== See also ==
- Iori River
