= Dedoplistsqaro Municipality =

Coordinates: 41°27′50″N 46°06′40″E

Dedoplistsqaro Municipality დედოფლისწყაროს მუნიციპალიტეტი
- Municipality
- Vashlovani National Park

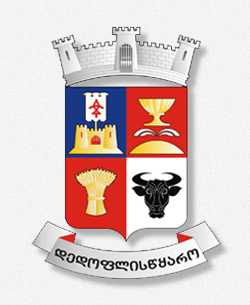
- Flag Seal

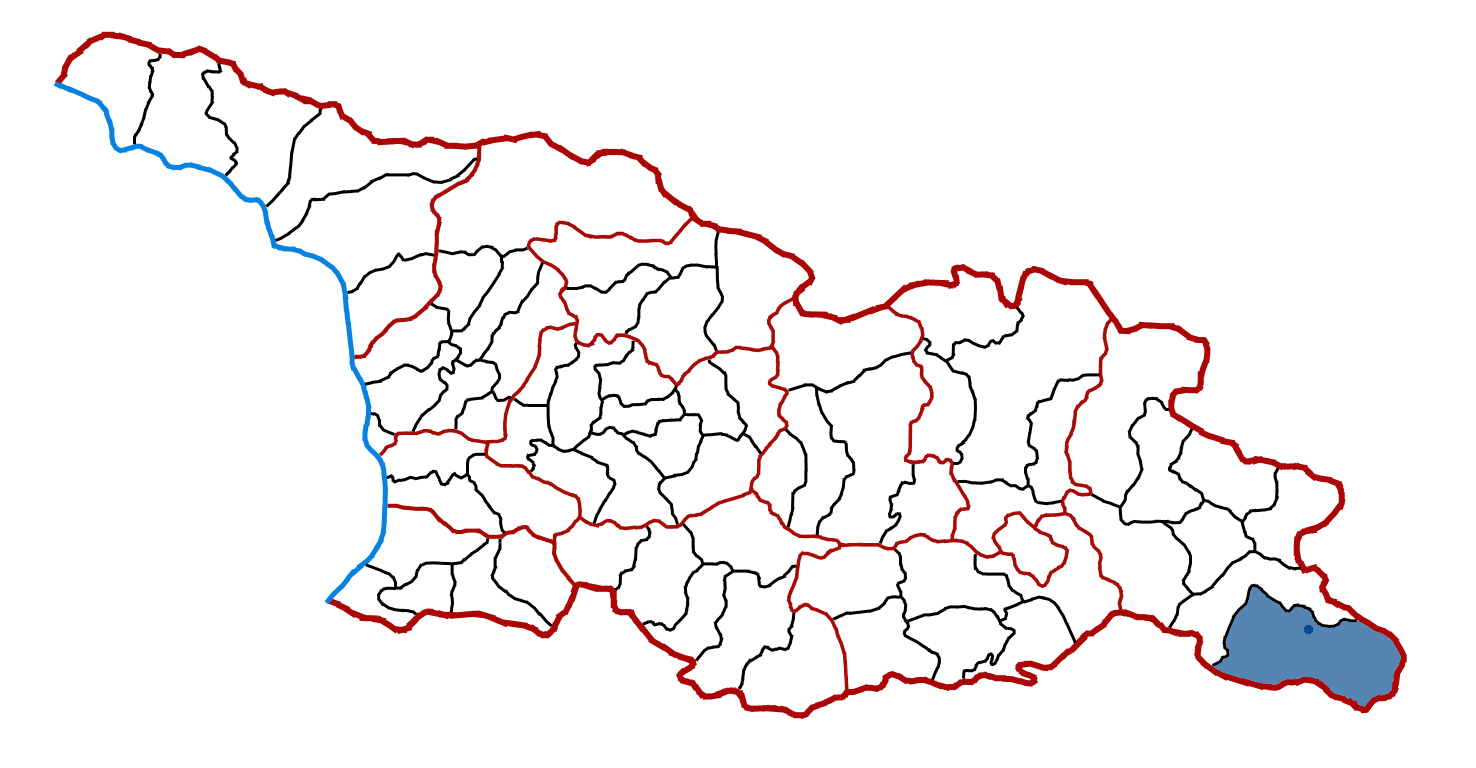
- Location of the municipality within Georgia
- Country: Georgia
- Region: Kakheti
- Capital: Dedoplistsqaro

Government
  - Body: Municipal Assembly
  - Mayor: Nikoloz Janiashvili (Georgian Dream)

Area
  - Total: 2,529 km^{2} (976 sq mi)

Population (2014)
  - Total: 21 221
  - Density: 8.4/km^{2} (22/sq mi)

Population by ethnicity
  - Georgians: 91.5%
  - Armenians: 4.3%
  - Russians: 1.8%
  - Azerbaijanis: 1.4%
  - Greeks: 0.3%
- Time zone: UTC+4 (Georgian Standard Time)
- Website: http://www.dedoplistskaro.gov.ge

Dedoplistskaro or Dedoplistsqaro (Georgian: დედოფლისწყაროს მუნიციპალიტეტი, 'Queen's spring') is a municipality of Georgia, in the region of Kakheti.

Dedoplistskaro municipality is bordered on the west and north by Signagi Municipality, and to the east and south by Azerbaijan. Dedoplistskaro municipality is the largest administrative unit of Kakheti. The area of the municipality is 2,529 km^{2} (976 sq mi). A large part of the territory of Dedoplistskaro municipality is occupied by the Iori Plateau, which stretches to the extreme south-eastern part of the Eldri plain. The municipality's administrative center is Dedoplistsqaro.

== History ==
From ancient times the territory of present-day Dedoplistskaro municipality was part of the historical Kambechovani province of Georgia. It was sometimes part of Kakheti and sometimes of Hereti. The main city of Kambechovan was Khornabuji, which was first mentioned in sources in the fifth century AD. At the beginning of the twentieth century, Dedoplistskaro, as an administrative-territorial unit, was part of Sighnaghi Mazra.

The name Dedoplistskaro has been known in historical sources since the eleventh century, when King David the Builder established a military post here. According to the legend, the origin of Dedoplistskaro is connected to the name of Queen Tamar. According to this legend, Queen Tamar visited Kambechovan with David Soslan and lived in Khornabuji for two weeks. At the top of the mountain were spring waters. The same year, the water was brought through clay pipes near the Khornabuji fortress and was renamed Dedoplistskaro ('Queen's water'), and later the name was extended to a village built there. In 1803, Russian troops established a military base on the site. They changed the name to Tsarsky Kolodtsi. Later, the Soviet authorities renamed the place Tsiteltskaro ('red water'). In 1991, the city and the entire district were restored to its historic name. Since 2006 it has been a municipality.

== Administrative divisions and population ==
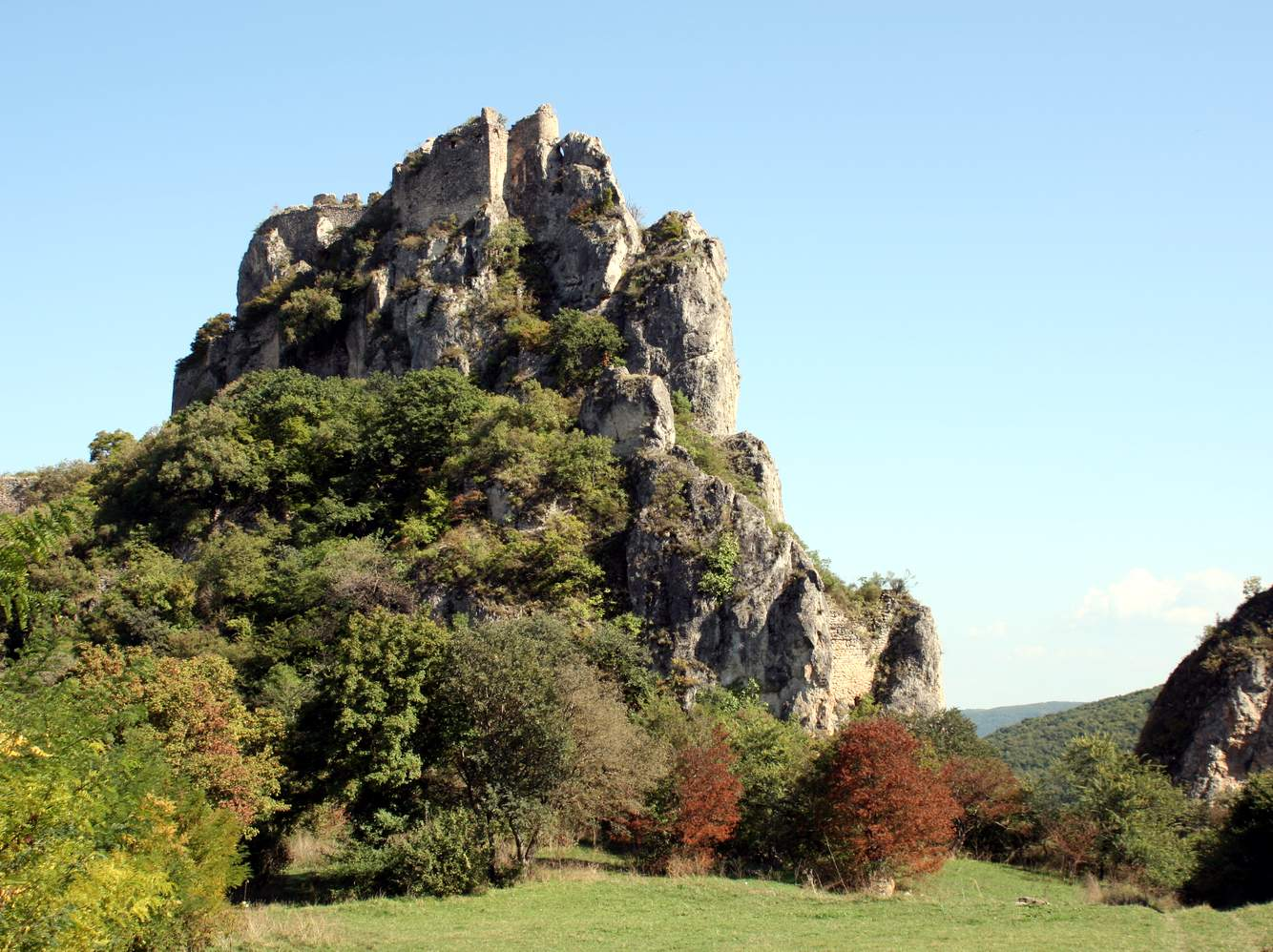
Khornabuji Castle

The municipality consists of 14 administrative units and 16 settlements. According to the National Statistics Office of Georgia, the population of Dedoplistsqaro Municipality as of 1 January 2021 is 20,700 people. 5,700 people live in urban areas and 15,000 people in rural areas.

The main zone of settlement is spread within 500–800 m (1,600–2,600 ft) above sea level. Mostly Georgians, a small number of Armenians, Russians, Azerbaijanis, and other nationalities live in the municipality. The largest part is the rural population.

Dedoplistsqaro is divided into the following administrative units:

- Town of Dedoplistskaro
- Arboshiki
- Arkhiloskalo
- Gamarjveba
- Khornabuji (including Choeti)
- Kvemo Kedi
- Mirzaani
- Ozaani (including Tavtsqaro)
- Pirosmani
- Sabatlo
- Samreklo
- Samtatskaro
- Zemo Kedi
- Zemo Machkhaani

=== Census data ===
| Census date | Population |
|---|---|
| 1989 | 37,299 |
| 2002 | 30,911 ▼ |
| 2014 | 21,221 ▼ |

The village of Choeti (124 people) has a Bosha plurality (52 - 41.94%), making it the only community in Georgia where Boshas make up more than 4% of the population.

== Geography and climate ==
Dedoplistskaro municipality is located in the Kakheti region. Its administrative center is Dedoplistskaro city. The municipality from the west and north is bordered by Sighnaghi Municipality, and from the east and south by the Republic of Azerbaijan. Dedoplistskaro is the largest administrative unit in Kakheti. The majority of the municipality is occupied by the Iori highland, which stretches to the extreme south-east part, to the Eldari lowland. The Eldari lowland is the only place in Georgia where semi-desert landscape is developed.

The municipality's territory includes the Gombori ridge south-east ending and also the Alazani lowland part from the village Samtatskaro to the river Agrichai connection. The hydrological network is poorly developed in Dedoplistskaro. There are short temporary rivers in this region. The district includes the following rivers: Alazani, Iori, Velijvari, Lekistskali, Uzundaraskhevi, Kushiskhevi, Ghoristskliskhevi, Kumuriskhevi, Pantishariaskhevi and others, as well as Kochebi lake and Patara lake. Dedoplistskaro is characterized by its ecological and biological diversity including semi-desert vegetation, prairie, rare forests and grove forests. Vashlovani National Park features desert and arid and deciduous forests. A number of plant species and animals are also found in the municipality, for example the striped hyena, gazelle, lynx, jackal, fox, wolf, Lelian's cat, badger and others. Dedoplistskaro's territory has two types of climate: a moderately warm steppe climate in the south and a moderately humid climate in the north. The average yearly temperature is 10.3 °C.

== Politics ==
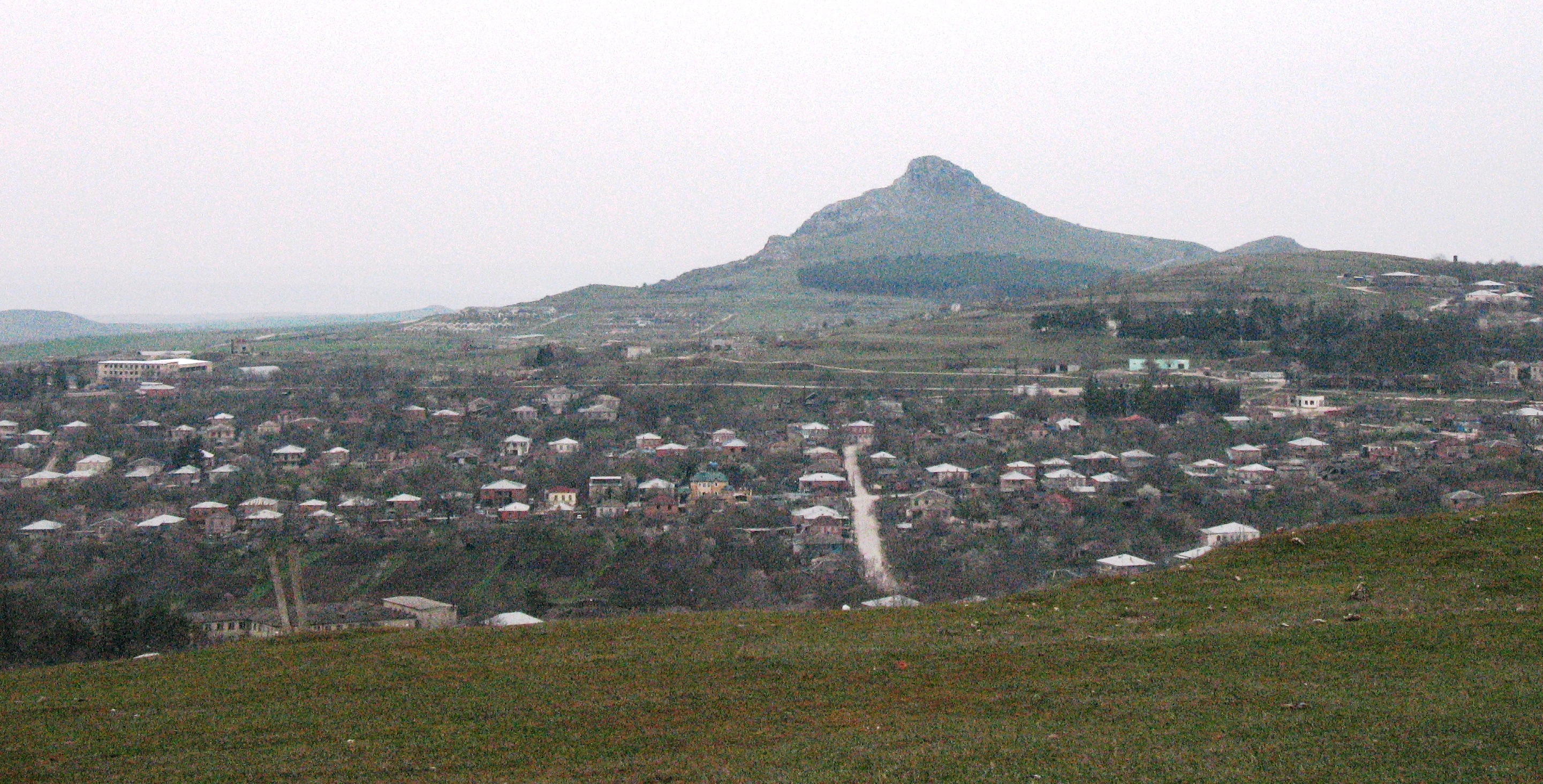
Town of Dedoplistsqaro

Dedoplistskaro Municipal Assembly (Georgian: დედოფლისწყაროს საკრებულო) is a representative body in Dedoplistskaro Municipality currently consisting of 30 members. The council is assembled into session regularly to consider subject matters such as code changes, utilities, taxes, city budget, oversight of city government and more. Dedoplistskaro sakrebulo is elected every four years. The last election was held in October 2021.

| Party | 2017 | 2021 | Current Municipal Assembly |
|---|---|---|---|
| Georgian Dream | 21 | 24 | |
| United National Movement | 3 | 5 | |
| People's Party | | 1 | |
| European Georgia | 2 | | |
| Alliance of Patriots | 2 | | |
| Total | 28 | 30 | |

== Education ==
There are 17 preschools in Dedoplistsqaro Municipality. Inclusive education is a special priority in the municipality's kindergartens.

15 public schools and one private school operate in the municipality.

== Culture ==
=== Dedoplistsqaro Museum of Local Lore ===
Dedoplistsqaro Museum of Local Lore was founded in 1975. The museum mainly preserves clay and bronze materials discovered during archeological excavations in the Dedoplistsqaro area (from the sixth to first centuries BC to the late feudal era): seals, jewelry, medical clayware, bronze tweezers, cult sculptures, buffalo masks, Scythian arrow blades. Numismatic finds include sixth-century Sasanian silver and gold coins, Georgian, Hulaguid, Russian, and German coins. There are ethnographic materials such as Qizikian rugs, saddlebags, striped woven cloths, red runners (carpets), gold-embroidered Qajar, and household items. The museum also keeps the paintings of Georgian artists of the twentieth century (Robert Sturua, A. Popiashvili, J. Gvimradze, R. Tordia, and V. Albirov). About 10,000 exhibits are preserved in the Dedoplistsqaro Museum of Local Lore. The museum's partner organizations are the Archaeological Institutes of Berlin and Halle.

=== Niko Pirosmanashvili House-Museum ===
Niko Pirosmanashvili House-Museum is a historical monument located in the Pirosmani district of the village of Mirzaani, Dedoplistsqaro Municipality. It was established in 1960 based on a house built by the artist in 1898. The complex includes a residential house, ancillary buildings, an exhibition hall built in 1979, in which the artist's organic paintings are exhibited ("Woman playing the harmonium", "Woman with Easter eggs", and "Shota Rustaveli"). More than 9,000 exhibits are kept in the museum, including Pirosmani's personal file from 1890, which sheds light on Pirosmani's biography and Pablo Picasso's lithograph "Portrait of Pirosmanashvili". The works of Georgian artists of the 20th century are also kept in the museum, reflecting the Qizikian life of the 20th century, carpets, rugs, pottery, work tools, and more.

=== Khornabuji Peoples' Friendship Museum ===
Khornabuji Peoples' Friendship Museum is a historical monument, located in the village of Khornabuji. The museum was founded in 1985 and is located in a one-story Russian-style house which was the property of G. Nechvelodov, an officer of the Nizhegorod Dragoon Regiment. He arrived with the Dragoon Regiment in Tsiteltskaro at that time and settled here. The house is built of logs, without using nails. It consists of four rooms in which Nechvelodov's personal belongings, ethnographic and various documentary materials are kept. The house was a gathering place for Georgian and Russian figures. At different times G. Nechvelodov was visited by Russian poets Alexander Pushkin and Mikhail Lermontov. In 1858, the French writer and traveler Alexandre Dumas stopped here.

=== Festivals and public holidays ===
| Event | Date | Description |
|---|---|---|
| Pirosmanoba | Third Saturday of October | The public holiday Pirosmanoba is traditionally held on the third Saturday of October. In parallel with cultural events and exhibitions, various sports competitions are held in the yard of Niko Pirosmani's house. It is also possible to taste traditional Georgian dishes. |
| Eliaoba | August 2 | The day named after the weather god Elijah (Elia). The menology also mentions the prophet Ilia, the same Tezbitel, on this day. Besides the fixed holiday, during the drought, not only the people but also the church asked St. Elia for rain. This day is especially celebrated in Dedoplistsqaro, where the church of St. Ilia Tezbitel on Mount Elia has existed since the sixth century. The parish comes to Dedoplistsqaro from different parts of Georgia especially for this day. |

== Sports ==
Dedoplistsqaro Municipality Sports and Youth Affairs Center has free sections in various sports. Athletes who train at the center participate in national and international tournaments every year.

== Historical sites and tourism ==
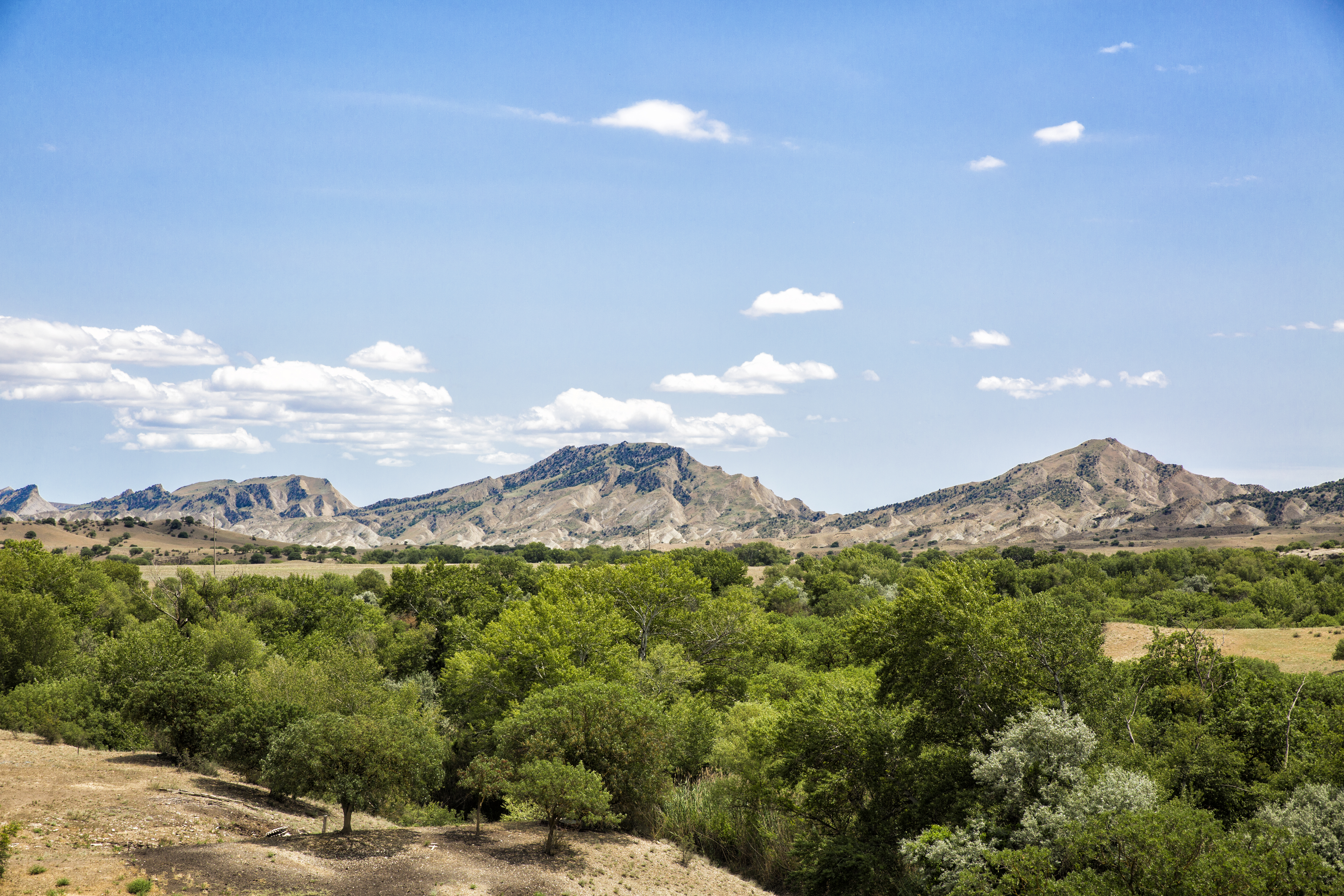
Chachuna Managed Reserve

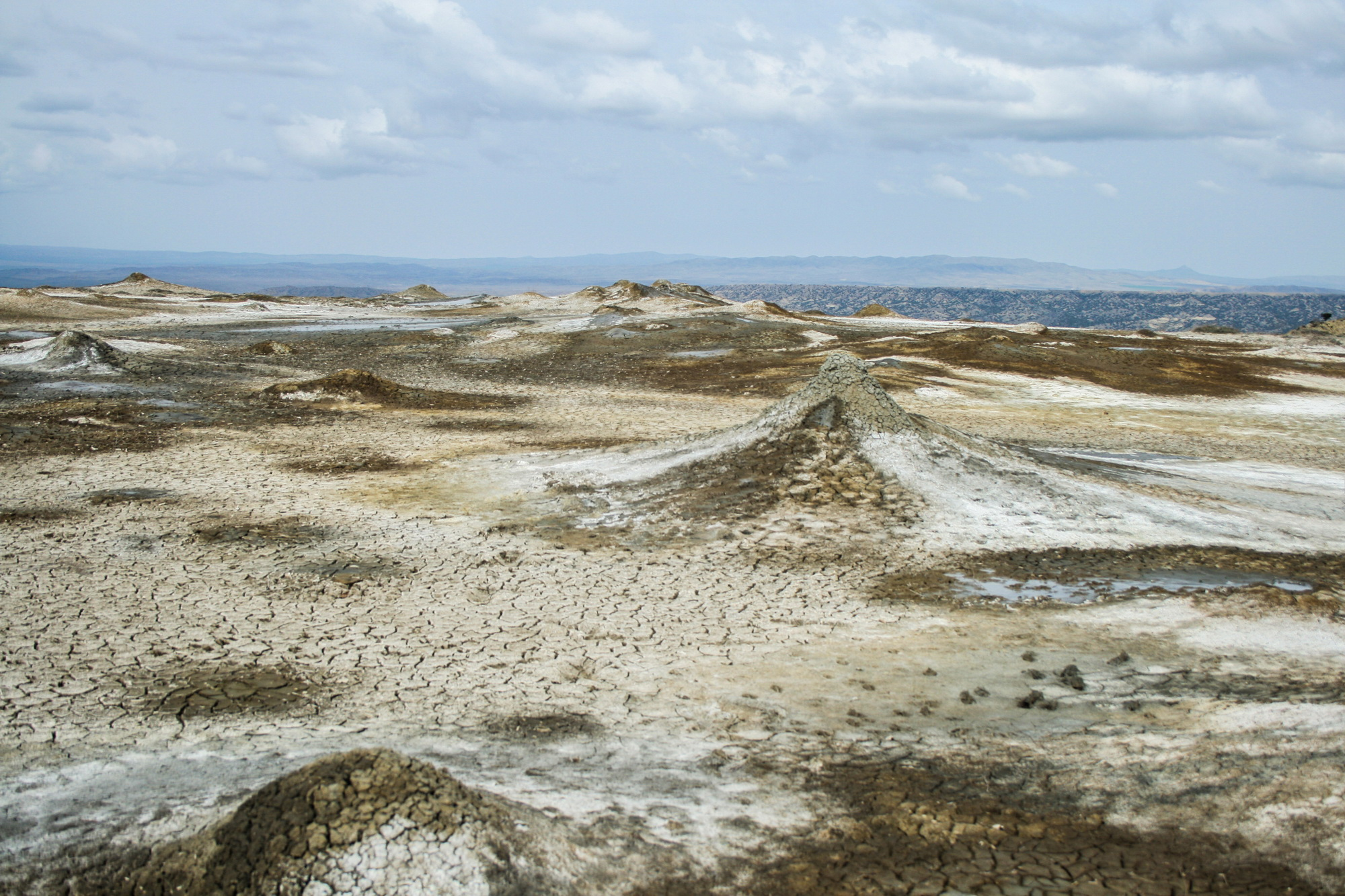
Takhti-Tepha Natural Monument

Numerous archeological, architectural, and historical monuments are located within the municipality's territory. One of the architectural monuments is the early medieval fortress-town of Khornabuji near the town of Dedoplistsqaro, which was the center of the historic Kambechovani district. In the village of Ozaani is the ninth-century domed Church of the Ascension, made of brick. Here is the medieval Trinity Church.

The municipality is widely represented by archeological monuments as well.

=== Cultural monuments ===
- Khornabuji Castle
- Elia Monastery
- Ozaani church
- Machkhaani Archangels church
- Mirzaani Alaverdi church

=== Nature ===
- Vashlovani National Park
- Chachuna Managed Reserve
- Takhtitepa mud volcanoes
- Artsivi gorge
- Didnauri
- Dali Reservoir

== Economy ==
Dedoplistsqaro municipality occupies 45,700 ha (113,000 acres) of arable land and 68,000 ha (170,000 acres) of pastures. Autumn grain crops – wheat and barley – are sown in the municipality. Spring crops are also sown in Dedoplistsqaro, mostly sunflower and corn.

Perennials are planted on 1,700 ha (4,200 acres) in the municipality, of which 1,450–1,500 ha (3,600–3,700 acres) are vineyards, and the rest are olives, almonds, and walnuts. Livestock in Dedoplistsqaro municipality is mainly represented by sheep and cattle breeding.

There are oil (Mirzaani, Shiraki) and limestone (Artsivi Valley) deposits in the municipality.

== Notable people ==
| Photo | Name | Years | Description |
|---|---|---|---|
| | Niko Pirosmani | 1862–1918 | Georgian painter. |
| | Dimitri Benashvili | 1910–1982 | Georgian critic, a specialist in literature, Doctor of Philology. |
| | Lasha Bekauri | born 2000 | Georgian Judoka, Olympic champion. |

== Twin towns ==
Dedoplistsqaro Municipality is twinned with:

- Kreminna Raion, Ukraine
- Kwidzyn, Poland
- Stanytsia-Luhanska Raion, Ukraine

== See also ==
- Didnauri
- Vashlovani National Park
