= Pyotr Kuryshko =

Pyotr Vasilyevich Kuryshko (Russian: Петр Васильевич Курышко) (1894 – 1921) was a Soviet Russian military commander involved in the Russian Civil War.

A World War I-veteran, Kuryshko joined the Red Army in 1918 and rose through the ranks during the civil war which followed the Russian Revolution of 1917. He fought a series of campaigns in the North Caucasus, ending up his career as a commander of cavalry division. He participated in the campaign in Armenia in 1920. During the war with Georgia in 1921, Kuryshko commanded the easternmost Russian contingent to have invaded that country. He was killed fighting Georgian troops at the town of Dedoplistsqaro.
