= Vashlovani Strict Nature Reserve =

Nature reserve in the country of Georgia

- IUCN category Ia (strict nature reserve)
- Vashlovani at Georgia and Azerbaijan border.

- Location within Georgia Location within Kakheti
- Location: Georgia
- Coordinates: 41°09′17.5″N 46°32′49.6″E
- Area: 176.12 km^{2} (68.00 sq mi)
- Established: 1935
- Governing body: Agency of Protected Areas
- Website: Vashlovani Protected Areas Administration

Vashlovani Strict Nature Reserve (Georgian: ვაშლოვანის სახელმწიფო ნაკრძალი) is a protected area in Dedoplistsqaro Municipality, Kakheti region of Georgia on Shiraqi mountain range and Georgian bank of Alazani River, at elevation 300-600 meters above sea level.

The total protected area is 10,143 hectares, with forest at 4.032 ha, and the rest are fields, desert, ravines. The purpose of the Nature Reserve is to protect and preserve rare species of rare forest flora and fauna.

== Flora ==
Protected forest mostly has pine tree and juniper. There are also Celtis, Pyrus salicifolia, pomegranate, Prunus mahaleb, Spiraea, Paliurus and wild pistachio tree (Pistacia mutica).

== Fauna ==
There are many species of birds: Rock partridge, Griffon vulture, Eurasian golden oriole, Mistle thrush, including near threatened Cinereous vultures (Aegypius monachus). Mammals are represented by wild boar, rabbit, fox, wolf, bear, striped hyena, European badger and leopard (Panthera pardus).

== Climate ==
In terms of climate this is the most dry and harsh region in Georgia. Climate is characterized by dryness and heat.

== See also ==
- Vashlovani National Park
- Iori Plateau
