= Cambysene =

Cambysene was a region first attested in the Geographica ("Geography") of the ancient geographer and historian Strabo (64/3 BC – c. 24 AD). According to Strabo, it comprised one of the northernmost provinces of the ancient Kingdom of Armenia, and bordered on the Caucasus Mountains and was a rough and waterless region through which a pass connecting Caucasian Albania and Iberia passed. It was eventually lost by Armenia to Caucasian Albania, likely after 69 BC.

== Name ==
The spelling Cambysene is the Latin form of the Greek Kambysēnē, which in turn was formed at some point in the Hellenistic period from an indigenous name which corresponded to Armenian Kʿambēčan. In Georgian the name is written as Kambečovani and in Arabic as Qambīzān. According to the 6th-century geographer Stephen of Byzantium, following popular but unverified traditional etymology, Kambysēnē was a persikē khōra ("Persian country") named after Cambyses II (r. 530–522 BC), King of Kings of the Persian Achaemenid Empire. This claim is rejected by modern-day academics, who point to the Cambyses (modern Iori) River, a tributary of the Cyrus (Kura) River, as the origin of the word. According to the Iranologist Ernst Herzfeld (1879–1948) both the Cyrus and Cambyses rivers as well as the Old Persian names Kuruš and Kambūjiya were derived from two ethnic groups; although considered to be an attractive assumption, Herzfeld's hypothesis is viewed as doubtful by Marie Louise Chaumont. Wilhelm Tomaschek connects the name to Armenian kambeči 'buffalo'.

== Geography ==
The precise boundaries of Cambysene are difficult to demarcate, but it is known that it constituted a border land between Armenia, Iberia and Caucasian Albania at the time of the 65 BC Roman military campaign in the region led by the general and statesman Pompey. The German historian Wilhelm Fabricius (1861–1920) believed that it just comprised the territory between the Cambyses and Alazonius (modern Alazan) rivers; the modern-day consensus is that it was much larger, and probably stretched all the way from the Cyrus river in the west to the Alazonius river in the east. Regardless of what Cambysene's precise boundaries actually were, the road(s) that passed through the region accorded to the region's geo-political importance. It is described as a sparsely inhabited and arid region.

== History ==
It is unknown whether Cambysene was incorporated into the Achaemenid Empire. When the Kingdom of Armenia under the Artaxiad dynasty was at its territorial apex, during the reign of Tigranes II of Armenia (r. 95–55 BC), Cambysene was one of its provinces or districts. Cambysene remained part of Armenia until it was conquered by Caucasian Albania, most likely after Tigranes was defeated in 69 BC by the Romans at the Battle of Tigranocerta.

The 7th-century Armenian geography Ashkharhatsuyts locates Kambechan (Kambečan) on the Kur River in Caucasian Albania, which reveals that Kambechan must have been smaller than the Cambysene of the Classical authors. The 10th-century historian Movses Kaghankatvatsi also mentions the province of Kambechan.

The Kambechan of Armenian historiography was conquered by the Arabs in the 7th century. At the turn of the 9th century, together with Shaki to the east, it comprised an extensive territory over which the Armenian Smbateans held sway as vassals of the more powerful Bagratid dynasty. Its inhabitants were predominantly of Armenian origin and speakers of the Armenian language.

== Sources ==
- Chaumont, Marie Louise (1990). "Cambysene". In Yarshater, Ehsan (ed.). Encyclopædia Iranica. Vol. IV/7: Calendars II–Cappadocia. London and New York: Routledge & Kegan Paul. p. 726. ISBN 978-0-71009-130-7.
- Hewsen, Robert H. (1992). The Geography of Ananias of Širak (Ašxarhac῾oyc῾): The Long and the Short Recensions. Wiesbaden: Dr. Ludwig Reichert Verlag. ISBN 3-88226-485-3.
- Sherwin-White, A. N. (1994). "Lucullus, Pompey and the East". In Crook, J. A.; Lintott, A.; Rawson, E. (eds.). The Cambridge Ancient History, vol. 9: The Last Age of the Roman Republic, 146–43 BC (2 ed.). Cambridge: Cambridge University Press.
