= Khornabuji Castle =

Castle in Georgia

Coordinates: 41°29′11.26″N 46°8′12.59″E

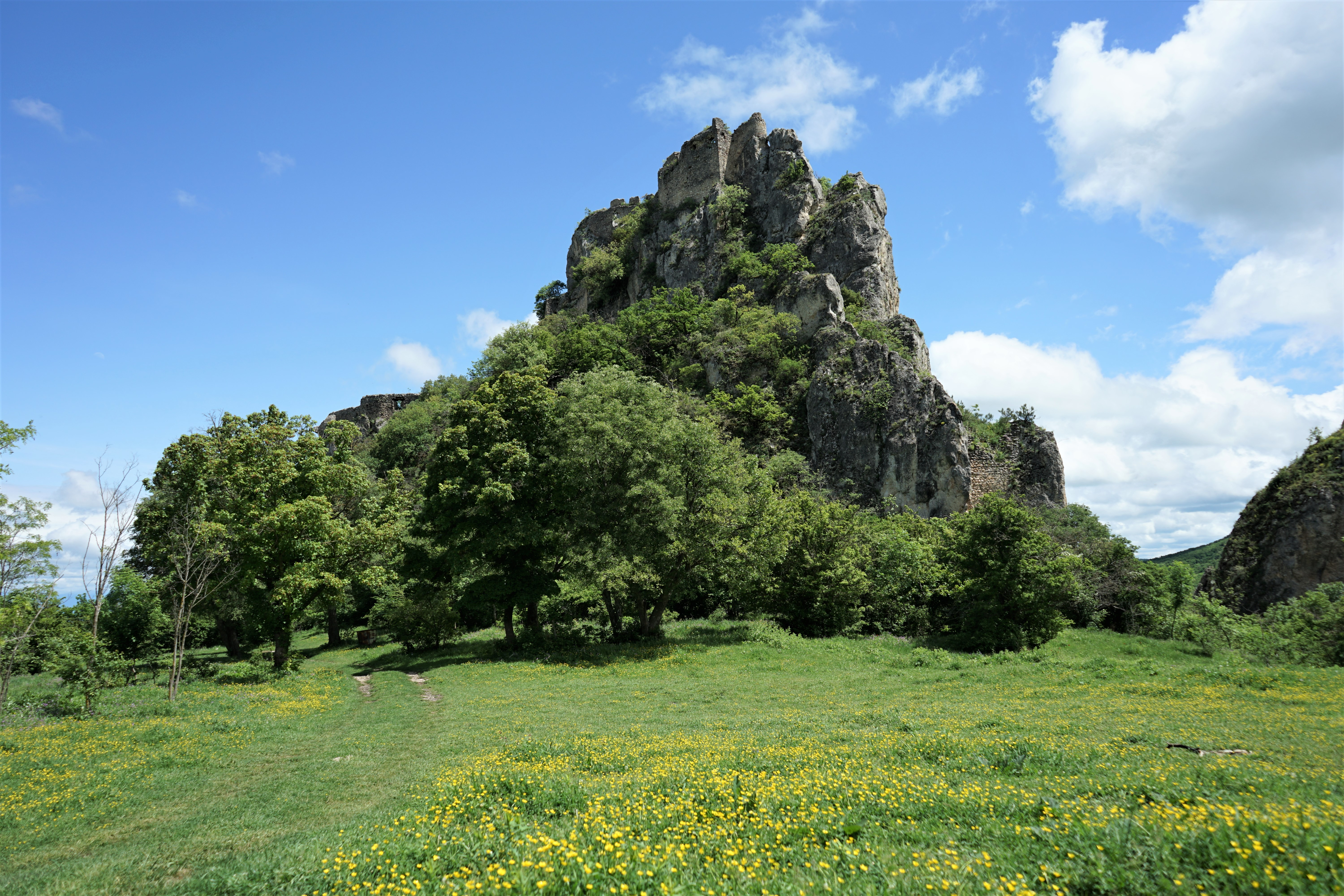
Remnants of Khornabuji castle on a cliff above the meadow.

Khornabuji Castle (Georgian: ხორნაბუჯი, romanized: khornabuji), also sometimes known as the Fortress of Tamar (Georgian: თამარის ციხე, romanized: tamaris tsikhe), is an ancient castle in the eastern part of Georgia, just south of the village of Khornabuji. It is located approximately two miles / 3 kilometers north of Dedoplistsqaro in the region of Kakheti. The castle's ruined remains are located on the imposing Tsiv-Gombori Range. It was probably constructed, originally, at the end of the 1st millennium BC, at which time it was the only fortification controlling the valleys of the Iori and Alazani rivers.

Archeological works conducted during the 1970s in the area uncovered extensive evidence of a settlement that flourished in the flat land beneath the castle during and before the medieval period. The first surviving written records of it date back to the reign of Vakhtang I, during the 5th century. At that time, Khornabuji was one of the largest settlements in the Kakheti region. According to the chronicle, it was one of several places to which Vakhtang appointed a bishop after he had built the Svetitskhoveli Cathedral at Mtskheta.

Late in the 5th or early during the 6th century, Khornabuji was conquered by the Sasanians. It appears the surrounding town was destroyed, though something of the castle survived and the town once again reappeared on the area of flat ground to the south of the castle rock over the following centuries. During the thirteenth century, according to some sources, the castle was rebuilt on the instructions of Queen Tamar, although others suggest that references to Queen Tamara building a castle may have referred to a castle built at another site. According to one interpretation of the sources the Khornabuji township was destroyed by Mongul invaders under Berke Khan around 1264, and survivors relocated to Sighnaghi, after which there was no further significant settlement outside the castle walls. An alternative view is that the settlement fell into ruin during the seventeenth century following the invasion undertaken by Iran under Shāh Abbās. The castle was later rebuilt under Heraclius II of Kartli-Kakheti, but the surrounding township was not.

== See also ==
- Artsivi Gorge Natural Monument
- Vashlovani National Park
