= Didnauri =

- დიდნაური (Georgian)
- Interactive map of Didnauri
- 41°24′53″N 46°13′23″E
- Periods: Late Bronze Age/Early Iron Age
- Region: Caucasus

Didnauri (Georgian: დიდნაური) is a Late Bronze Age/Early Iron Age archaeological site in Georgia, located in the steppes of the Shiraki Plain in the country's southeasternmost municipality of Dedoplistsqaro. The National Agency for Cultural Heritage Preservation of Georgia, which supports the ongoing field works, has described it as "the largest ever ancient settlement" unearthed in the South Caucasus. The site is inscribed on the list of the Immovable Monuments of Cultural Heritage of Georgia.

The Didnauri site was discovered, in 2014, through satellite imagery in the western part of the Shiraki Plain used as croplands. Preliminary digs revealed ruins of a large settlement, which was dated by a team of Georgian archaeologists to the period of 12th to 9th century BC. The settlement is encompassed by a 1.5 km-long and 7 m-wide defensive wall made of clay and wooden logs, "unique in its scale and design", as described by the expedition led by the archaeologist Konstantine Pitskhelauri. The pattern of destruction of the wall suggests an unexpected natural disaster, presumably an earthquake. Among other ruined structures unearthed were several buildings, including those apparently used for religious rituals, a water supply system, and four tombs, which contained the early 10th-century BC artifacts such as ceramic vessels, stone tools, and bronze items. One of the tombs belonged to an upper-class warrior who was buried with his dagger and had an arrowhead, not of local origin, lodged in his stomach area.
