= Iori Plateau =

Coordinates: 41.4155°N 45.8775°E

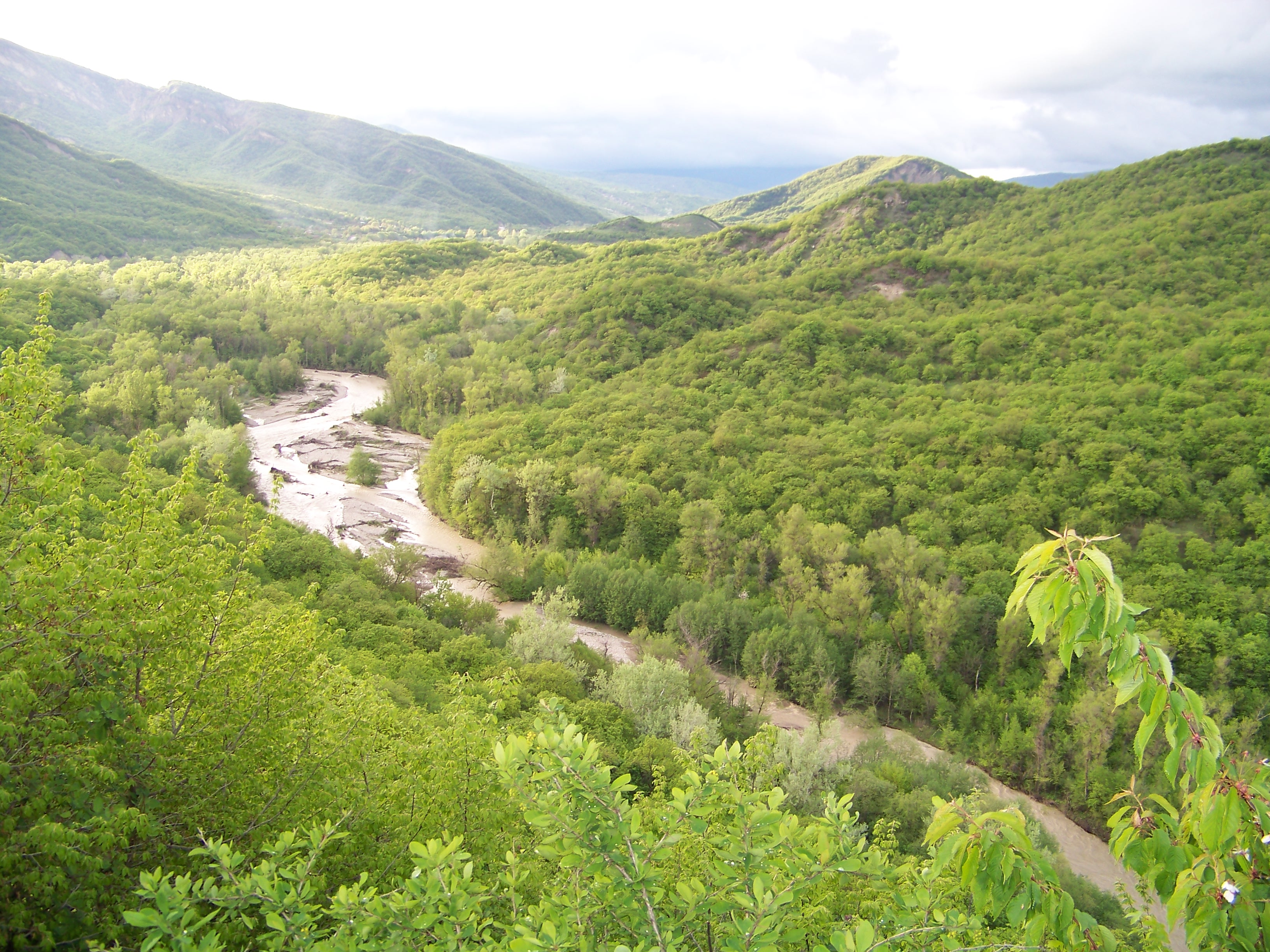
The Iori near the village of Ujarma.

The Iori Plateau (Georgian: ივრის ზეგანი, ivris zegani), also known as Gare-Kakheti Plateau (გარე კახეთის ზეგანი, gare kakhet'is zegani) is a plateau between the Kura and Alazani rivers in southeastern Georgia, transected by the Iori River. The elevation of the plateau is between 200 m and 900 m. The soils are predominantly chernozem. A significant portion of the plateau is occupied by steppes, such as Shiraki Plain in its eastern part.

== See also ==
- David Gareja monastery complex
