= Dedoplistsqaro =

Dedoplistskaro დედოფლისწყარო
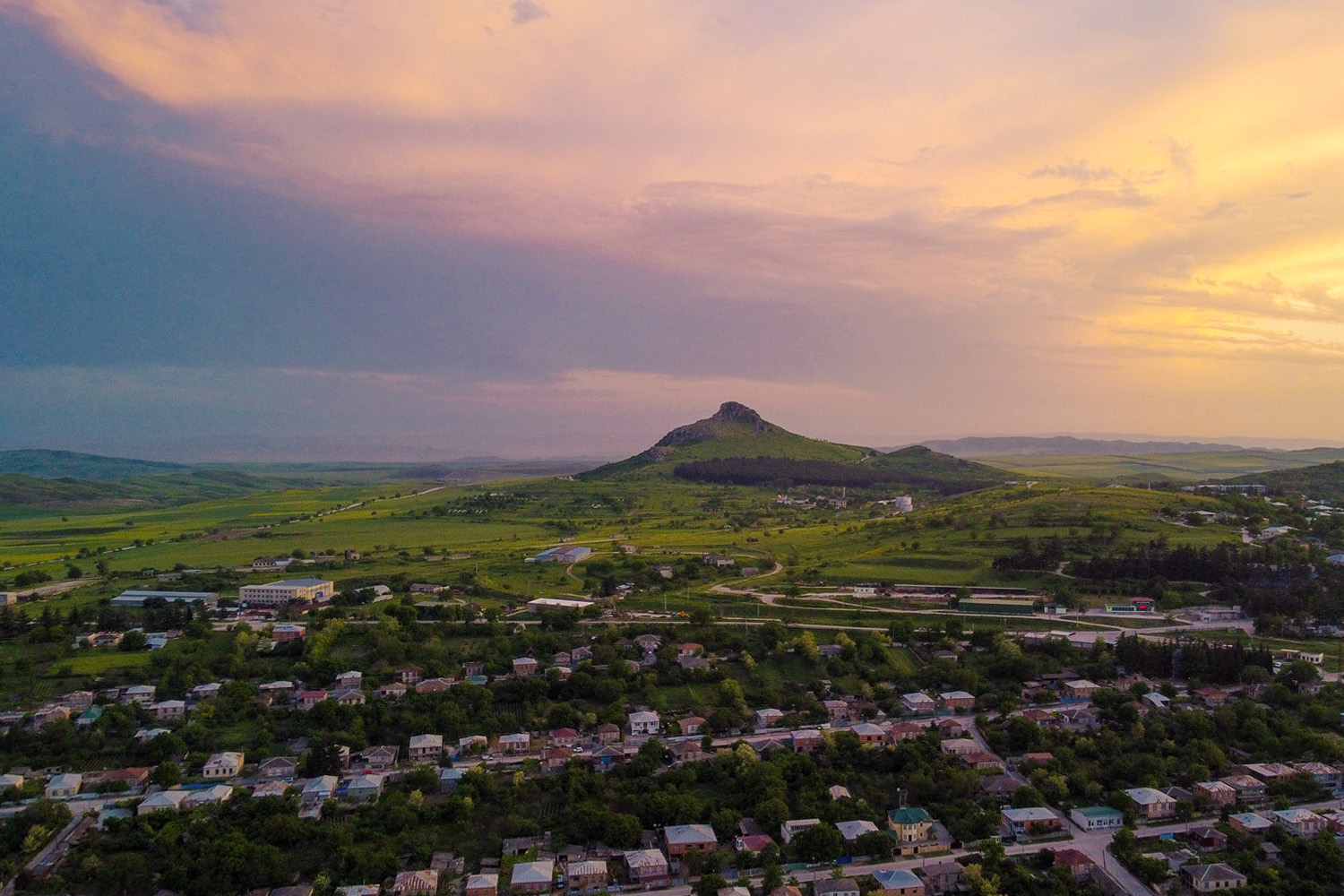

- Location within Georgia Location within Kakheti
- Coordinates: 41°27′50″N 46°06′40″E
- Country: (Georgia (country)) Georgia
- Mkhare: Kakheti
- Municipality: Dedoplistsqaro
- Elevation: 800 m (2,600 ft)

Population (2024)
  - Total: 5,772
- Time zone: UTC+4 (Georgian Time)
- Website: dedoplistskaro.ge

Dedoplistskaro or Dedoplistsqaro (Georgian: დედოფლისწყარო, pronounced [d̪e̞d̪o̞pʰlis̪tsʼχʼäɾo̞], literally: Queen's spring) is a town in Kakheti, Georgia with a population of 5,772 living in 1,995 households. The town is located in the Shiraki Plain, eastern Georgia, and functions as a municipality of the eponymous district. The majority of the inhabitants are ethnic Georgians. The municipality itself is surrounded to the southeast by Azerbaijan, and to the northwest by Signagi Municipality.

== History ==
=== Medieval history ===
The area around Dedoplistskaro has been inhabited for just over 3 millennia, and many archaeological sites can be found around the town, predominantly from the Kura-Araxes Culture.

Prior to the town being founded, Khornabuji Fortress was supposedly built by King Vakhtang Gorgasali in the 5th century.

The locale is first mentioned in the medieval annals as a military post established by King David IV of Georgia (r. 1089–1125). Tradition relates its name, literally meaning "the Queen’s spring" to Queen Tamar (r. 1184–1213). Dedoplistskaro was a part of the ancient province of Kambechovani, later renamed to Kiziki. Queen Tamar majorly improved the fortifications around Khornabuji and the general infrastructure around the area, constructing clay pipes to transport water from the source. From the 13th to 18th centuries, not much happened in Dedoplistskaro.

=== Russian control ===
The Russian Empire acquired the area in 1801, as the Kingdom of Kartli-Kakheti agreed to be annexed by them. After the annexation of Georgia, Russians established a military fort in 1803 to fend off the area being attacked by the Dagestani rebels and renamed the village into Tsarskie Kolodtsy (Russian: Царские Колодцы), that is "the royal wells". Dedoplistskaro was used as a staging ground againt the Persians in the Russo-Persian war of 1804, serving as a vital military outpost and supply depot for Russian soldiers. Russia also claimed that they should control the areas previously controlled by Queen Tamar 600 years prior.

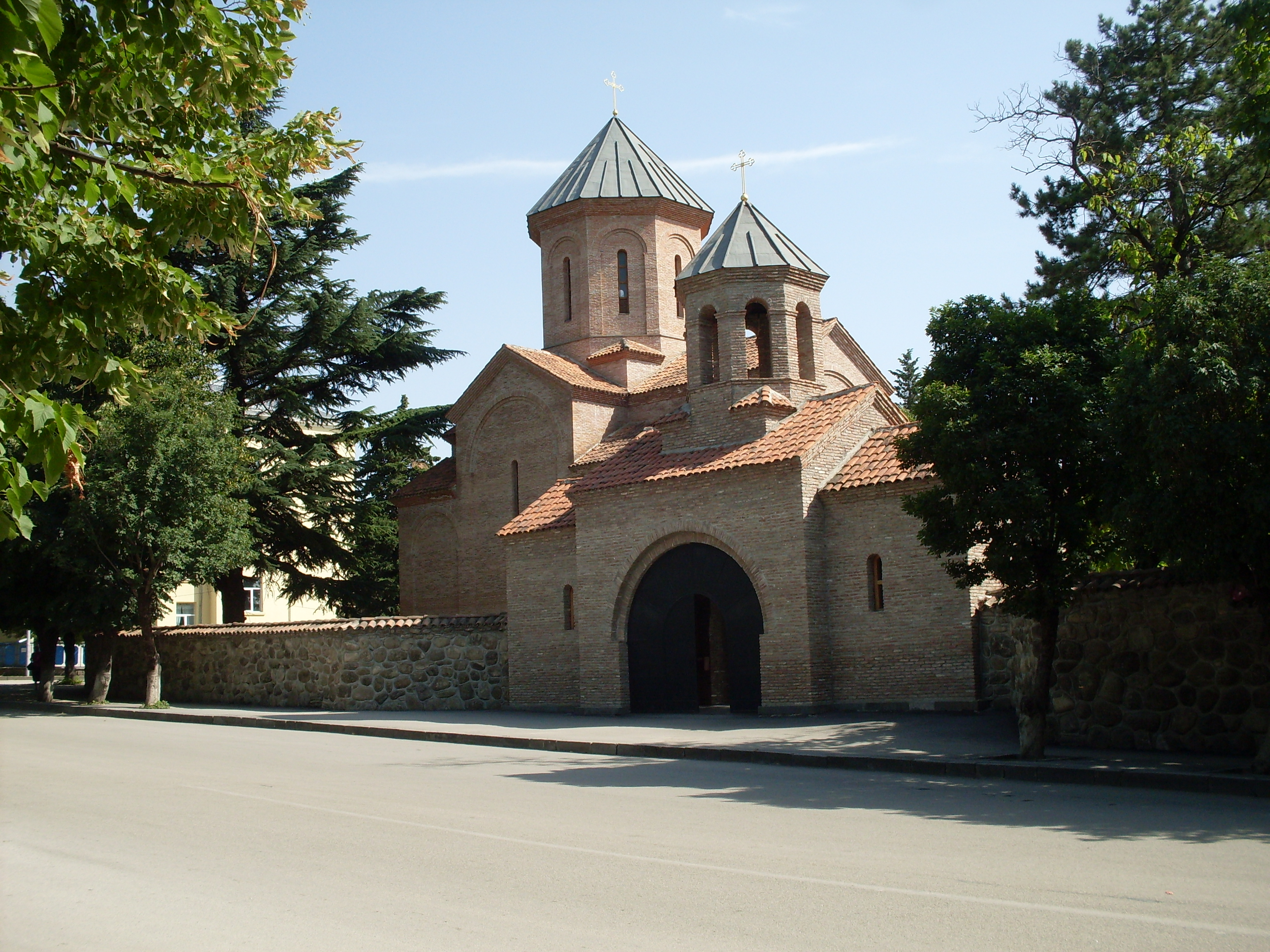
A church in Dedoplistsqaro

In 1858, the French writer Alexander Dumas travelled to Dedoplistskaro during his visit to Caucasus, noting the fortress of Khornabuji and Mount Elias, to the south of the town.

In 1869, the German entrepreneurs Carl Heinrich von Siemens and Ernst Werner von Siemens established an oil refinery near the village which functioned until the mid-1870s.

The village retained its military installations and a large garrison during Georgia's brief independence from 1918 to 1921. It was seized by the invading Soviet Russian forces after hours of heavy fighting with Georgian troops on February 18, 1921. The Russian commander Pyotr Kuryshko died in this battle.

The Soviet government changed the name into Tsiteltskaro (წითელწყარო; "Red Spring") and granted the settlement a town's status in 1963. In 1991, the historical name of Dedoplis Tskaro was restored. Ruins of the medieval fortress of Khornabuji lie near the town. The Vashlovani State Reserve is also located within the Dedoplistskaro municipality.

== Economy ==
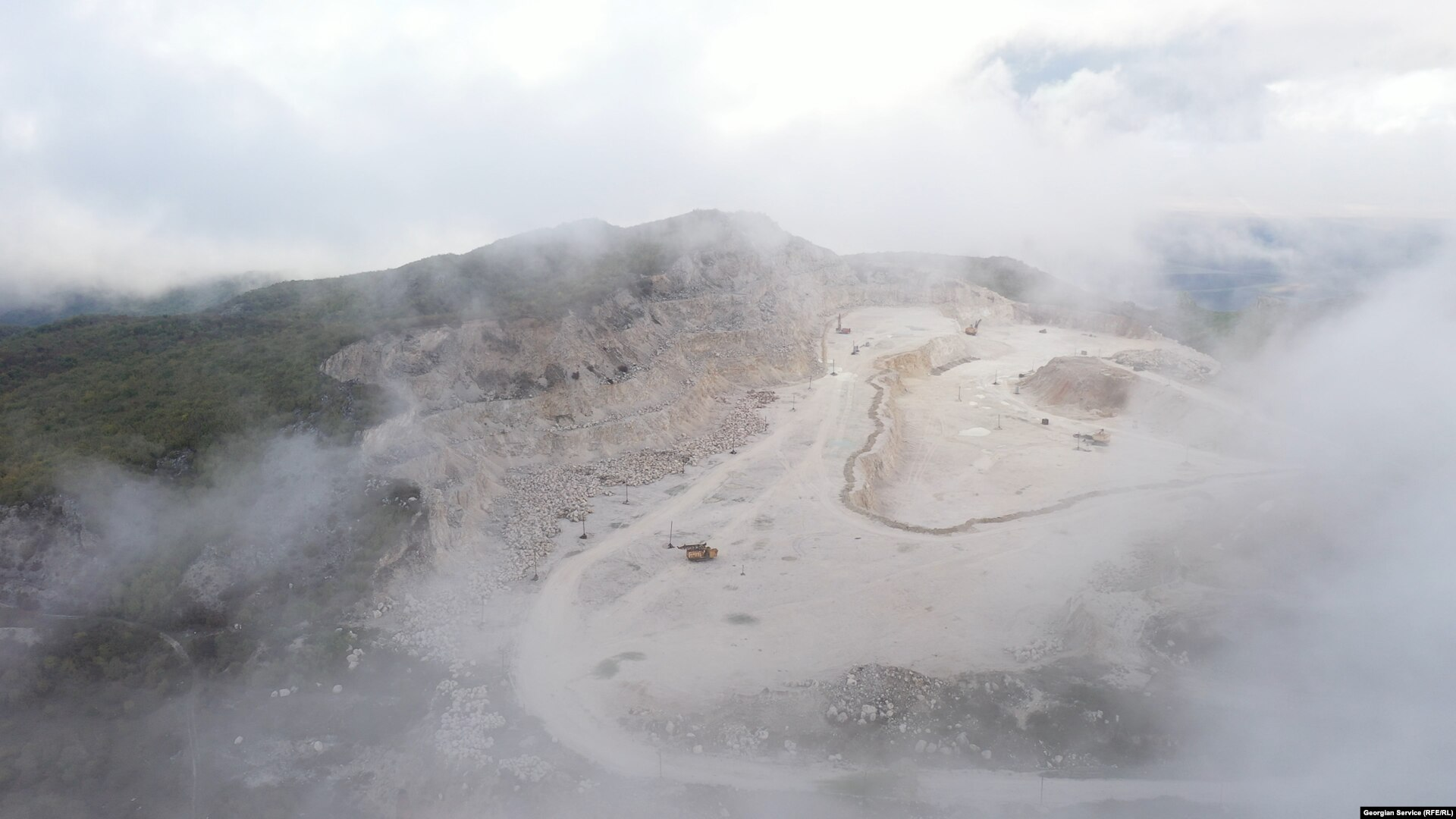
The limestone quarry in Dedoplistskaro, Georgia

In 1954, a limestone quarry was opened just north of the town, and is run by Heidelberg Cement, employing around 1,000 people nationally. It is one of the largest mines in Georgia. This has, however, caused some controversy across both the local population and the EU, as the quarry harms the local environment, impacting the regions ecosystem and destroying habitats.

Tourism plays a large part in the local economy, with multiple hotels and hostels being located within the confines of the town. The aforementioned fortress of Khornabuji is a popular tourist attraction in the area, and combined with the Dedoplistskaro Biosphere Reserve brings in a large income for the town and municipality. Some more tourist attractions include Mount Elias, Saint Seraphim Church, and Ozaani Ascension.

== Demographics ==
=== Ethnicity ===
According to the 2024 Georgian census, the population of urban Dedoplistskaro is 5,772, whereas the municipality has a population of 18,904. Of this 18,904, 17,204 (91%) are ethnically Georgian, whereas 851 (4.5%) are Armenian, and 312 (1.7%) are Azerbaijani. Other, less notable minorities include Abkhazian and Russian.

=== Gender & Religion ===
8,999 (47.6%) of the municipalities population are male, 9,905 (52.4%) are female.

There are 17,433 (92.2%) Orthodox Christians, 981 (5.2%) are Muslims, and 219 (1.2%) are Armenian Orthodox.

== Climate ==
Climate data for Dedoplistskaro (elev. 800m) (1991–2020)
Month	Jan	Feb	Mar	Apr	May	Jun	Jul	Aug	Sep	Oct	Nov	Dec	Year
Record high °C (°F)	19.1 (66.4)	19.4 (66.9)	25.6 (78.1)	30.6 (87.1)	32.4 (90.3)	39.3 (102.7)	40.9 (105.6)	40.8 (105.4)	36.0 (96.8)	31.6 (88.9)	23.2 (73.8)	18.6 (65.5)	40.9 (105.6)
Mean daily maximum °C (°F)	4.9 (40.8)	6.1 (43.0)	10.6 (51.1)	15.9 (60.6)	21.0 (69.8)	26.8 (80.2)	29.8 (85.6)	29.7 (85.5)	24.5 (76.1)	18.1 (64.6)	11.0 (51.8)	7.2 (45.0)	17.1 (62.8)
Mean daily minimum °C (°F)	−2.8 (27.0)	−2.2 (28.0)	1.1 (34.0)	5.8 (42.4)	10.5 (50.9)	15.7 (60.3)	18.4 (65.1)	18.2 (64.8)	13.8 (56.8)	8.6 (47.5)	2.8 (37.0)	−1.3 (29.7)	7.4 (45.3)
Record low °C (°F)	−13.2 (8.2)	−14.8 (5.4)	−8.8 (16.2)	−6.9 (19.6)	1.0 (33.8)	6.3 (43.3)	9.9 (49.8)	9.3 (48.7)	3.3 (37.9)	−1.4 (29.5)	−7.4 (18.7)	−12.6 (9.3)	−14.8 (5.4)
Average precipitation mm (inches)	29.8 (1.17)	28.2 (1.11)	47.7 (1.88)	63.9 (2.52)	91.9 (3.62)	75.3 (2.96)	51.0 (2.01)	36.0 (1.42)	56.7 (2.23)	50.9 (2.00)	38.5 (1.52)	21.1 (0.83)	591 (23.3)
Average precipitation days (≥ 1.0 mm)	10.4	9.9	14.3	16.9	21.6	15	10.9	7.8	10.2	12.1	10.4	7.8	147.3
Source: NOAA

== See also ==
- Kakheti
