= Vashlovani National Park =

National park in Georgia

- IUCN category II (national park)
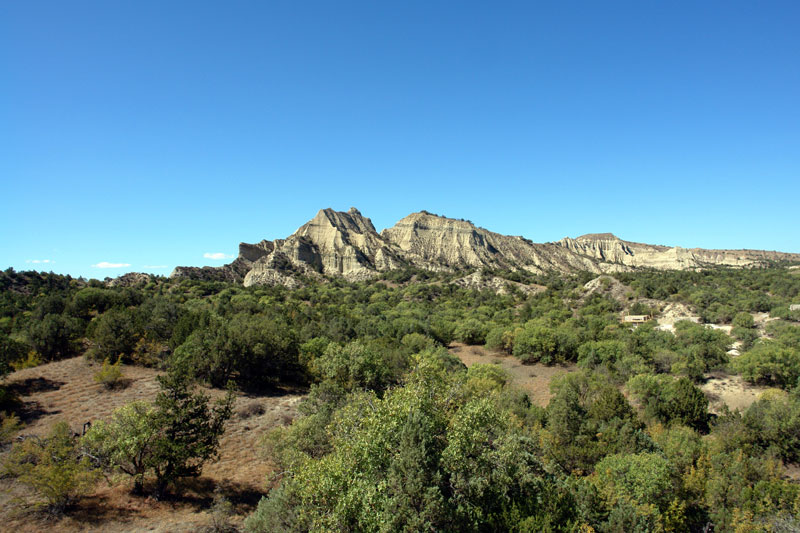
- Vashlovani State Reserve.

- Location within Georgia Location within Kakheti
- Location: Georgia, Dedoplistsqaro Municipality
- Coordinates: 41°12′N 46°23′E
- Area: 442.51 km^{2} (170.85 sq mi)
- Established: 1935
- Governing body: Agency of Protected Areas
- Website: [https://vashlovanilocals.wordpress.com/ Vashlovani Protected Areas Administration]

Vashlovani National Park (Georgian: ვაშლოვანის ეროვნული პარკი) is a national park located in the eastern part of Georgia, and was established in 1935 to preserve its unique shallow forests. In April 2003 the reserve's area was expanded to 84.80 km^{2} (32.74 sq mi) and Vashlovani National Park (251.14 km^{2} (96.97 sq mi)) was made.

The area is characterized by its dry climate sitting only 150–50 meters (490–160 ft) above sea level.

Vashlovani State Reserve is notable for its unique, badland-like areas of desert and semi-desert steppe vegetation and arid and deciduous forests. It is also home to the great canyon cliffs, known in the area as the "Sharp Walls", and the magnificent Alazani flood plains and forests.

== Flora and fauna ==
Special features include the occurrence of wild pistachio trees, peonies and various types of orchids in addition to some endemic plant species. The fauna includes 25 species of reptiles, including species such as Macrovipera lebetinus and Eryx jaculus. Among more than 100 native bird species are the imperial eagle, black vulture, pheasant and the rare black stork. The 46 mammal species include golden jackals, red foxes, wolves, Eurasian lynxes, brown bears, jungle cats and porcupines. In 2003, for the first time the track of a Caucasian leopard was discovered; the following year, a leopard in the national park area was recorded for the first time with a camera trap.

== See also ==
- Vashlovani Strict Nature Reserve

check the information for the visitors of Vashlovani National Park on this web page Vashlovani Locals
