= Iori (river) =

River in Georgia and Azerbaijan

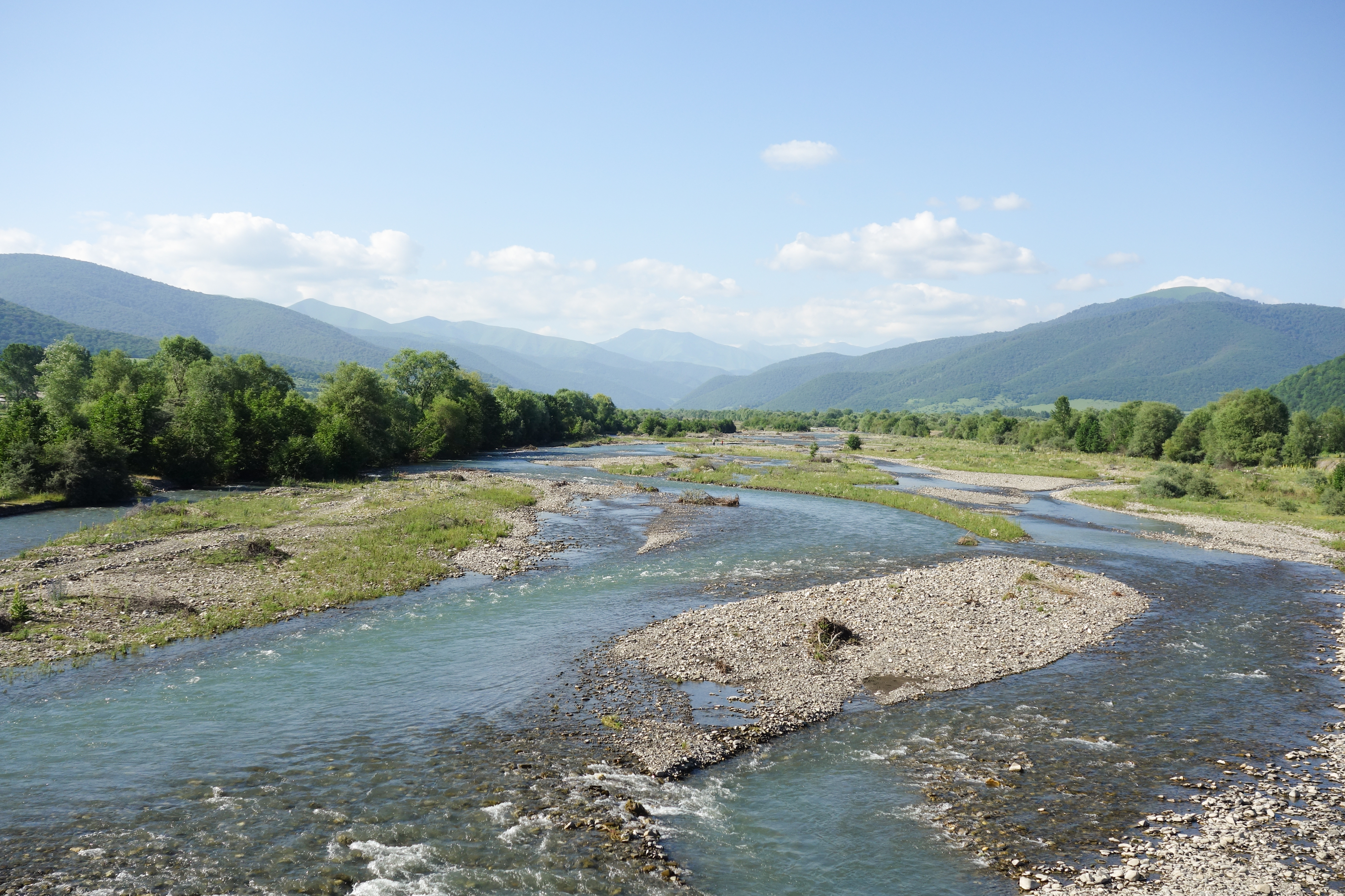
- The Iori in Tianeti.
- Native name: იორი (Georgian); Qabırrı (Azerbaijani)

Location
- Country: Georgia, Azerbaijan

Physical characteristics
- Source: Greater Caucasus
- Mouth: Mingachevir reservoir
- Length: 320 km (200 mi)

The Iori (Georgian: იორი, Azerbaijani: Qabırrı) is a river in the South Caucasus that originates in the Greater Caucasus Mountains in eastern Georgia and flows south into Azerbaijan, where it is also known as Gabirry (Qabirry). The river eventually flows into the Mingachevir reservoir, which is drained by the Kura. It is 320 km (200 mi) long, and has a drainage basin of 4,650 km^{2} (1,800 sq mi). It starts in the mountains northeast of Tianeti, flows through that town, swings east and flows through the lowlands parallel to and between the Alazani (north) and the Kura (south).

In Antiquity, the river was known as the Cambyses river. This ancient name of the river was also lent to the ancient region of Cambysene.
