= Roads in Georgia (country) =

Georgia road network

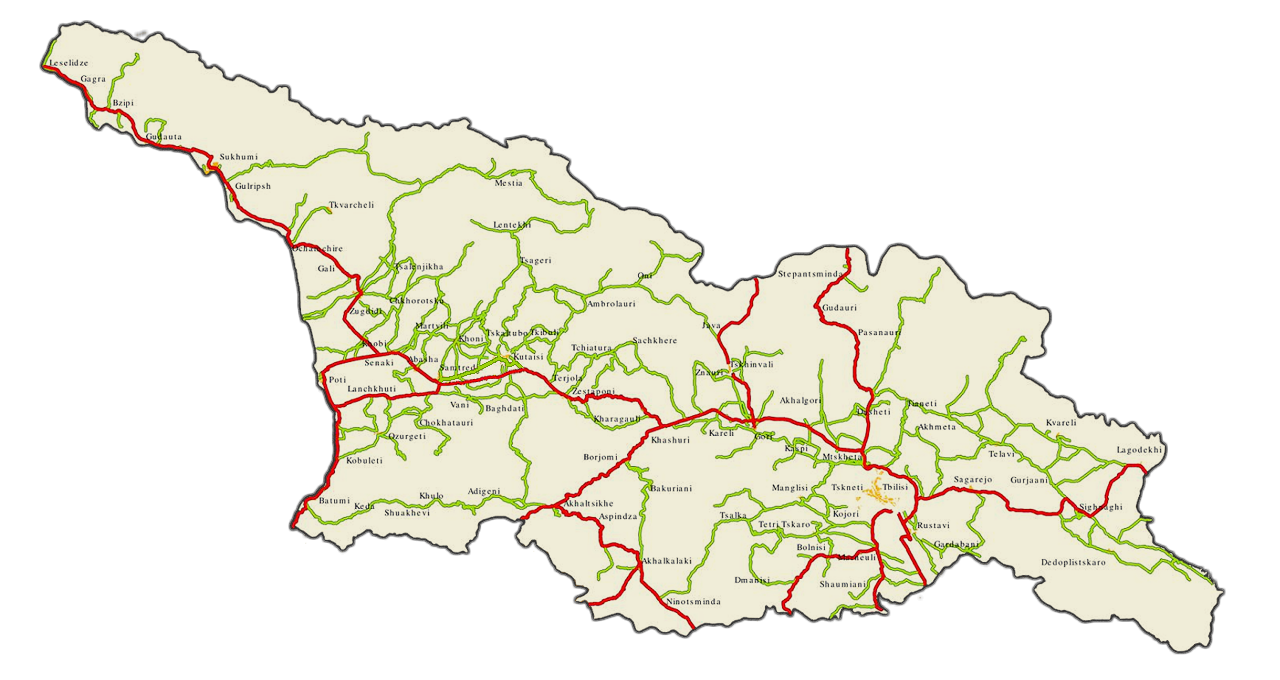

System information
- Maintained by the Roads Department of Ministry of Regional Development and Infrastructure of Georgia (GeoRoad)
- Length: 21,110 km (13,120 mi)
- Formed: 1996

Highway names
- International roads: ს x - ს xx (S)
- State roads: შ x - შ xxx (Sh)
- Local roads: ა x - ა xxx (A, per municipality)

System links
- Roads in Georgia; International Routes; National Routes

Georgia's road network plays an important role in both domestic and international traffic with the four neighboring countries. This is expressed in the road numbering system. The country has a network of 13 internationally oriented trunk highways that connect the capital Tbilisi, home to about a third of the national population, with its four neighboring countries. This is also the backbone of a network of domestic oriented national roads connecting vital regions with each other.

The total length of the road network is approximately 21,110 kilometres (13,120 mi) according to 2021 numbers. Only a limited number of these are express roads or motorways which are in good condition. The quality of the other roads varies greatly. Signposts are in both Georgian and Latin script, but the road number prefix is always in Georgian script. European E-routes are indicated on the signposts while Asian AH roads are not.

== Numbering ==
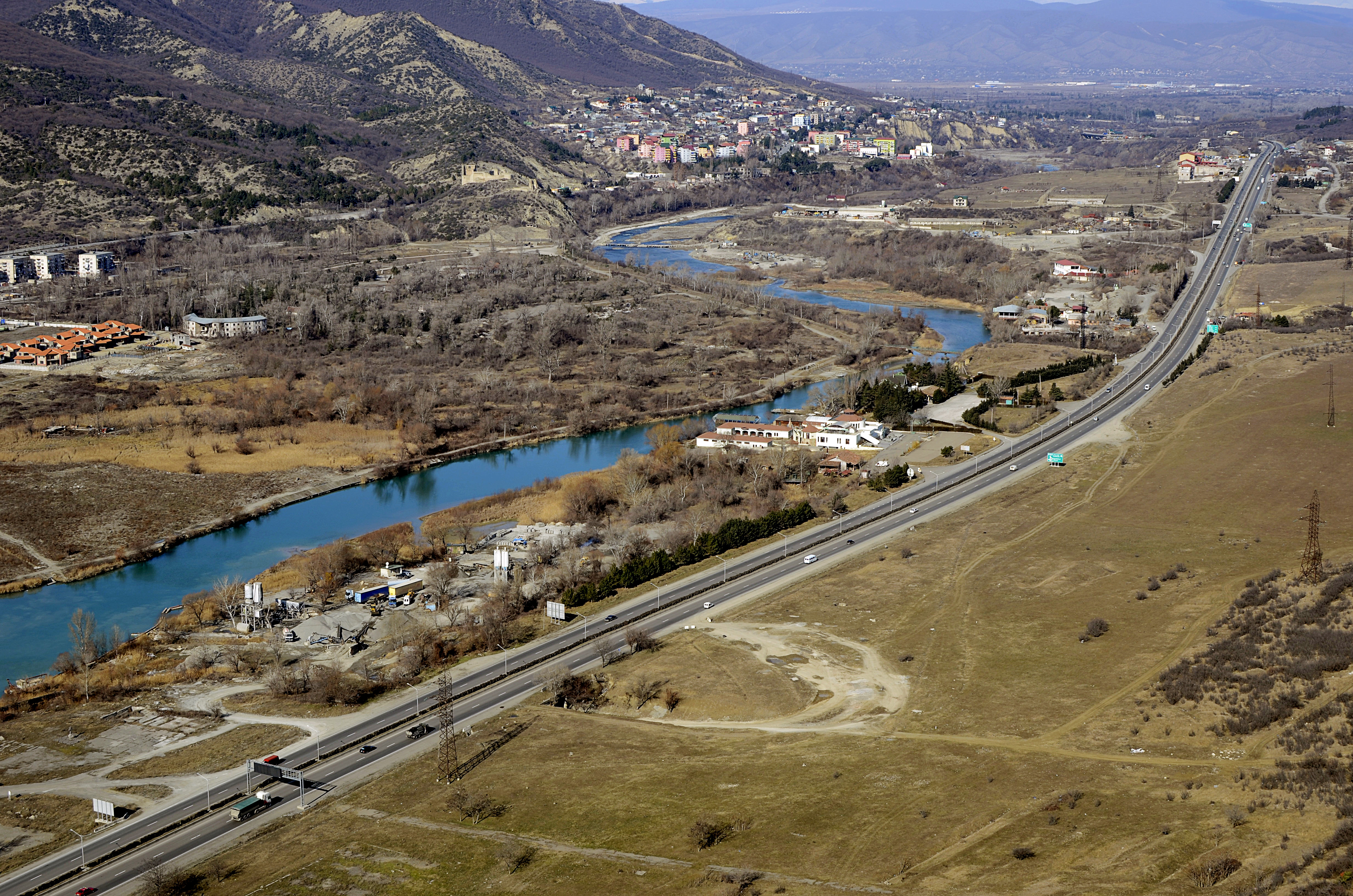
Georgia has few Limited-access roads

The road numbering in Georgia consists of three layers: roads of "international" (Georgian: საერთაშორისო, saertashoriso), "domestic" (შიდასახელმწიფოებრივი, shidasakhelmts’ipoebrivi) and "local" (ადგილობრივი, adgilobrivi) importance. This system was introduced at the end of 1996, including a new list of major roads.

The law on roads defines:

- roads of international importance as roads connecting administrative, important industrial and cultural centers of Georgia with other countries;
- roads of domestic importance as roads connecting Tbilisi with cultural or economic centers, capitals of the Autonomous Republics and administrative centers of the regions, as well as accessing roads of international and domestic importance and connecting important centers of the Autonomous Republics;
- roads of local importance as roads connecting administrative centers of municipalities with their communities, roads connecting them with international and domestic roads and between communities, as well as roads connecting tourist, recreational, sporting, historical, cultural or scientific destinations with municipal centers.

These three categories are denoted by the Georgian letters ს (S), შ (Sh) and ა (A), derived from the first letter of their class:

- ს stands for "საერთაშორისო მნიშვნელობის გზა" (Saertashoriso mnishvnelobis gza, road of international importance)
- შ stands for "შიდასახელმწიფოებრივი მნიშვნელობის გზა" (Shidasakhelmts'ipoebrivi mnishvnelobis gza, road of domestic importance);
- ა stands for "ადგილობრივი მნიშვნელობის გზა" (Adgilobrivi mnishvnelobis gza, road of local importance).

The list of international (S) and domestic (Sh) roads is reviewed every 5 years according to the road law and requires government approval. Since the decentralization in 2007, local A-roads are designated by the municipalities. Each municipality manages up to hundreds of A-roads. In the Autonomous Republics of Adjara and Abkhazia, local A roads are reviewed every three years by the Autonomous Government. For Abkhazia, this is the autonomous government-in-exile recognized by Tbilisi, which effectively exercises no authority over the area.

== Network ==
Roads of "international importance" in Georgia

European and Asian highways through Georgia

Since the introduction of the current system, the Georgian network of numbered roads has been gradually expanding. In 2011, the S13 was added as an S-trunk highway, promoted from an Sh-road, after the decision to open a new border crossing with Turkey. Adjustment in highway lengths occur due to realignments. Most of the growth in the route network is achieved with the Sh roads of domestic importance. In 2006 the amount of routes increased considerably due to a major reassessment. The table below does not specify A-roads of local importance as data is generally not very consistent or complete to create a reliable picture. S and Sh roads fall under the responsibility of the Roads Department of the Ministry of Regional Development and Infrastructure of Georgia while local A roads are the responsibility of municipalities.

	1996	2005	2006	2008	2011	2014	2017	2022
ს-roads (S)	12	12	12	12	13	13	13	13
ს-roads (S)	1581 km 982 mi	1581 km 982 mi	1565 km 972 mi	1563 km 971 mi	1603 km 996 mi	1603 km 996 mi	1595 km 991 mi	1593 km 990 mi
შ-roads (Sh)	73	74	194	199	200	202	205	209
შ-roads (Sh)	3392 km 2108 mi	3417 km 2123 mi	5446 km 3384 mi	5446 km 3384 mi	5308 km 3298 mi	5298 km 3292 mi	5373 km 3339 mi	5460 km 3390 mi
Total length	4973 km 3090 mi	4998 km 3106 mi	7011 km 4356 mi	7009 km 4355 mi	6911 km 4294 mi	6901 km 4288 mi	6968 km 4330 mi	7053 km 4383 mi
The table is based on successive decreed lists for "Determination of International, Domestic and Local Roads of Georgia" of 1996, 2005, 2006, 2008, 2011, 2014, 2017 and 2022.

=== Roads of international importance ===
Shield

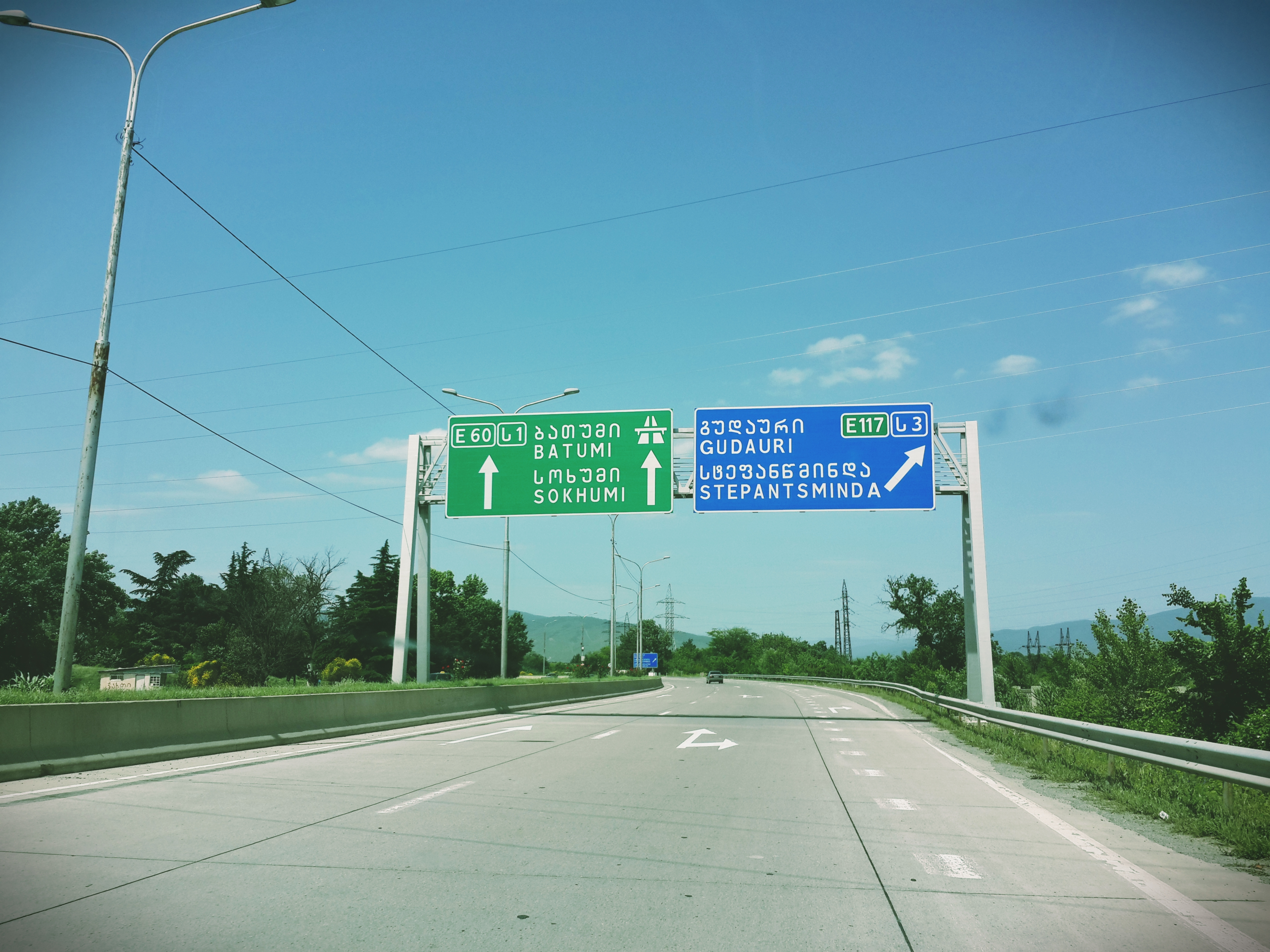
Road sign S highway

The S-roads "of international importance" are indicated by a blue shield with white letters. The expressway or motorway sections are marked with a green shield with white letters. These highways are numbered ს1 to ს13 (or S1 to S13). Eleven of these terminate at Georgia's international border, while two act as connectors within the S-network (S9 and S12). The S9 is the mandatory bypass around Tbilisi for international transit traffic between the S1, S4 and S5 highways, while the S12 connects S1 and S2 highways via a shorter route to/from Turkey. Two S-routes run partially through Abkhazia (S1) and South Ossetia (S10) regions which sections are beyond control of Georgian authorities. Through travel is not possible from/to Tbilisi controlled territory, except for foot passage into Abkhazia. However, these roads serve traffic with Russia from within both regions.

Most of the roughly 1,600 kilometres (990 mi) of S-roads are in a good or acceptable condition with an asphalt or concrete surface. Typically they have been built as two-lane highway. Limited sections have been upgraded since 2006 to motorway and 2 or 4 lane expressway and this is gradually expanding. These upgrades are mostly related to the E60/E70 East-West Highway project, an internationally sponsored project to upgrade the (East-West) transport corridor through Georgia, connecting Azerbaijan, Armenia and Turkey. Most S-routes are part of European E-roads which are often signposted together with the Georgian road numbers. Three Asian Highway Network routes traverse Georgia, but these are not signposted.

=== Roads of domestic importance ===
Shield

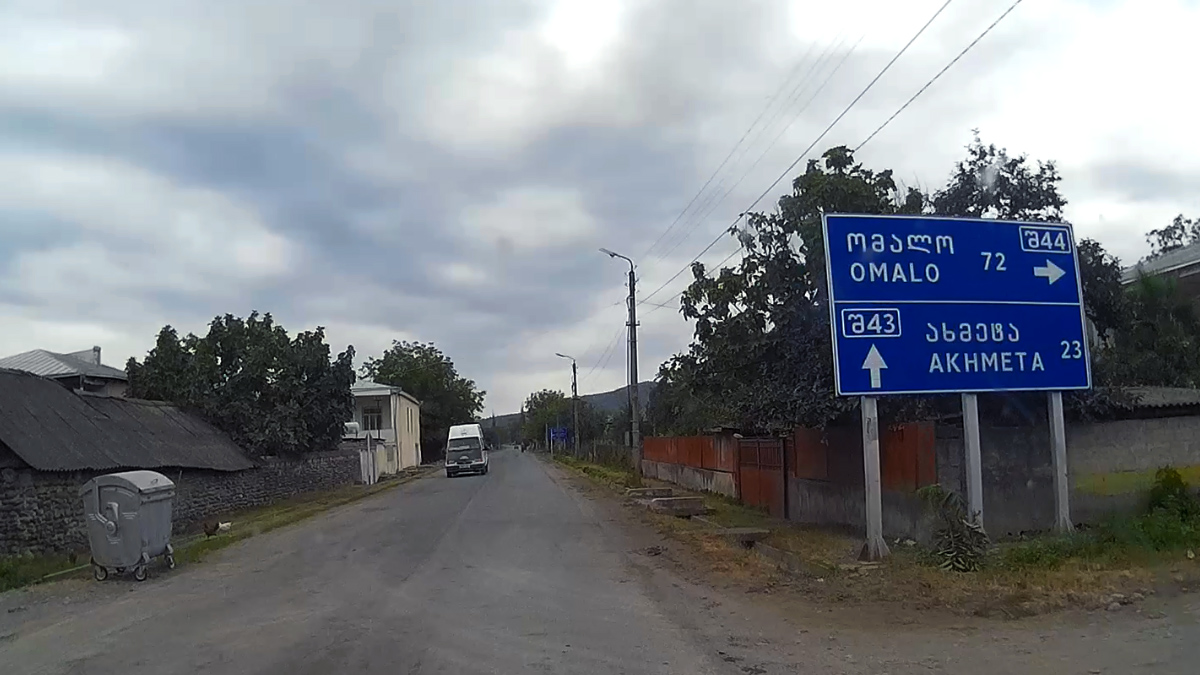
Destination sign Sh road

The vast network of 5,460 km (3,390 mi) domestic შ Sh-roads connects vital regions with each other and the capital. By far most of these routes are relatively short, but some routes are quite long, up to nearly 200 km. The longer Sh-roads are interregional in nature while others are designed as part of a subregional network, provide access to the main S-highways or remote mountain valleys. The list of Sh-routes is slowly expanding. Recent additions შ203, შ204, შ 205 and შ 208 are former parts of the S1, S2 and S12 highways, renumbered to Sh-road after realignment of sections of these highways. More of such additions can be expected with the ongoing and scheduled realignment of parts of key S-highways. At the same time, new important regional routes are being built in mountain regions and elsewhere, such as the შ 209 Sachkhere - Oni road.

The condition of Sh-roads varies from excellent to horrid. From newly sealed (asphalt) to unsealed or lacking decades of reconstruction. This mixed picture also applies to long distance Sh-routes. That said, with the limited resources the state has, some key projects have been launched since 2006, and increasingly so since 2014. The Sh7 road to Mestia in the Svaneti mountain valley and the long distance Sh31 through the southern Samtskhe-Javakheti region were key regional road projects during the tenure of 3rd President Saakashvili. In more recent years other long and medium distance roads in the regions in partially or wholly terrible shape have been reconstructed, such as the Sh16 through Racha, the Sh26 to Shatili, the Sh38 across the Gombori mountains and others. Also, the construction of regional bypasses, such as the new Sh207 Gurjaani-Bakurtsikhe Bypass, are a point of attention. Overall, the quality of the regional road network is improving with the years, but large sections remain in bad (unsealed) condition under sometimes harsh climatic conditions, especially in the mountainous regions.

== Speed limits ==
Speed limits

The speed limits in Georgia are determined by the Traffic Act, Section 33.

Historically, the speed limit in Georgia was 90 km/h (56 mph) as there were no motorways in the country. That has changed since construction of motorways commenced with the new government after the 2003 Rose Revolution for which the speed limit was raised to 110 km/h (68 mph). This limit can mainly be found on a large part of the S1/E60 highway between Tbilisi and Samtredia, but also on the short motorway section of the S12. In contrast, the short motorway section of the S4 between Tbilisi and Rustavi has a speed limit of 90 km/h (56 mph).

Vervoersmiddel	City	Rural	Motorways
Passenger and cargo vehicle (<3.5 t)	60 km/h (37 mph)	90 km/h (56 mph)	110 km/h (68 mph)
Small bus and motorcycle	60 km/h (37 mph)	80 km/h (50 mph)	80 km/h (50 mph)
Vehicle with trailer (>3.5 t)	60 km/h (37 mph)	70 km/h (43 mph)	80 km/h (50 mph)
Vehicle with passenger trailer	60 km/h (37 mph)	60 km/h (37 mph)	60 km/h (37 mph)

There are a number of streets in Tbilisi, Batumi and Kutaisi where the speed limit exceeds the general 60 km/h (37 mph) limit for built-up areas. These are for example:

- The Mtkvari embankments Tbilisi have a limit of 70 km/h (43 mph);
- George W. Bush Street ("Kacheti Highway", S5) to Tbilisi International Airport has a speed limit of 80 km/h (50 mph);
- Davit Aghmashenebeli Avenue (S1) through the Dighomi district of Tbilisi has a speed limit of 80 km/h (50 mph).

== History ==
Numbered main roads Caucasus region USSR 1960–1982.

For decades the Soviet Union lacked a systematic public numbering system for its (trunk) road network. In 1960 a list of 37 numbered "highways of national importance" across the 15 Soviet Socialist Republics was adopted. Three of these routes passed through the Georgian Soviet Socialist Republic: the 16, 17 and 19. These were canceled in 1982 with a major revision of the road numbering.

	Route	Length*	Currently part of
16	Beslan - Ordzhonikidze - Tbilisi - Leninakan - Yerevan	270 km (170 mi)	S3 (Georgian Military Highway) and S6 via Marneuli with transit through Tbilisi city.
17	Tbilisi - Kutaisi - Samtredia	245 km (152 mi)	S1 between Natakhtari and Samtredia but through the cities of Gori, Khashuri and Kutaisi
19	Novorossiysk - Batumi	404 km (251 mi)	S1 (Sokhumi - Zugdidi, Samtredia), part of S12, Sh2 via Ozurgeti and S2
*) Shown is the length of the route within the Georgian SSR.

M and A main roads through Georgia 1982-1996

In 1982 a three-tier classification system was adopted in the Soviet Union with M, A and R (Russian: Р) routes, which laid the foundation for the current Georgian numbered trunk road network. The routes can still be found in the current Georgian network, especially the M and A roads. The M (Магистральные, Magistral'nyye, arterial) and A (Автомобильные, Avtomobil'nyye, automobile) routes "of national importance" were assigned at the federal Soviet level, while the R ("republican") routes were assigned at the SSR republic level. Cross border R-routes therefore had different numbers on either side of the internal border. The A-routes had 3 digits and were assigned according to their region: the 300 series was assigned to the Caucasus and Central Asia. The A routes had 3 digits and were assigned according to their region: the 300 series was assigned to the Caucasus and Central Asia. The R routes had 1 to 3 digits, based on their importance in the road network.

One M-route (M-27) and ten A-routes (A-301 to A-310) led through the Georgian SSR. These designations were maintained in independent Georgia until 1996/1997 when Georgia switched to their own (and current) system.

	Route	Length*	Currently part of
M-27	Novorossiysk - Tbilisi - Baku	604 km (375 mi)	Entire S1, through Tbilisi city, and entire S4.
A-301	Tbilisi (Natakhtari) - Beslan	137 km (85 mi)	S3 (Georgian Military Highway)
A-302	Tbilisi - Lagodekhi via Bakurtsikhe	152 km (94 mi)	S5 (Kakheti Highway). A-302 continued as A-315 after Lagodekhi
A-303	Tbilisi - Bogdanovka (Ninotsminda) via Manglisi	164 km (102 mi)	Via Tbilisi's Sololaki District, Kojori, Manglisi and then Sh31 to Ninotsminda.
A-304	Tbilisi - Leninakan (Gyumri) until A-306	98 km (61 mi)	Entire S6
A-305	Mikha Tskhakaya (Airbase Senaki, M-27) - Batumi	97 km (60 mi)	S2 highway from Senaki via Poti to Batumi
A-306	Batumi - Leninakan (Gyumri) through Akhaltsikhe	166 km (103 mi)	Sh2 Batumi - Akhaltsikhe and S11 via Ninotsminda to Armenia
A-307	Kutaisi - Benara (A-306) via Sairme	104 km (65 mi)	Sh14 Kutaisi - Benara (Sh2 connection) via Baghdati and Sairme
A-308	Khashuri - Akhaltsikhe	77 km (48 mi)	S8 highway Khashuri - Akhaltsikhe via Borjomi
A-309	Bzyb - Avadhara through Ritsu	59 km (37 mi)	Entire Sh11 route (located in Abkhazia).
A-310	Kirovakan (Vanadzor) - Marneuli through Alaverdi	349 km (217 mi)	Entire S7 highway Marneuli - Sadakhlo
*) Shown is the length of the route within the Georgian SSR.

In 1997, remaining terminology of the Soviet numbering system were subtly removed from the old road law. The word "trunk road" (მაგისტრალური, magist'raluri, for M-road) was replaced with "international" and "republican" (რესპუბლიკური, resp'ublik'uri, R-road) with "domestic".

In practice this meant that most of the (Soviet) Georgian A-routes and the only M-route were reclassified and renumbered as S-roads and former R-routes as Sh-roads. The rationale behind this was that most of the M and A major roads that independent Georgia inherited from the Soviet Union in 1991 lead to the country's outer borders, in some cases with a short extension, such as the S2 and S8. As a result, the trunk road network became strongly internationally oriented.

== Border checkpoints ==
Georgia has 14 border checkpoints for vehicular traffic with its four neighbours. Eleven of these are the terminus of an S-road, the other three connect to a domestic Sh-road.

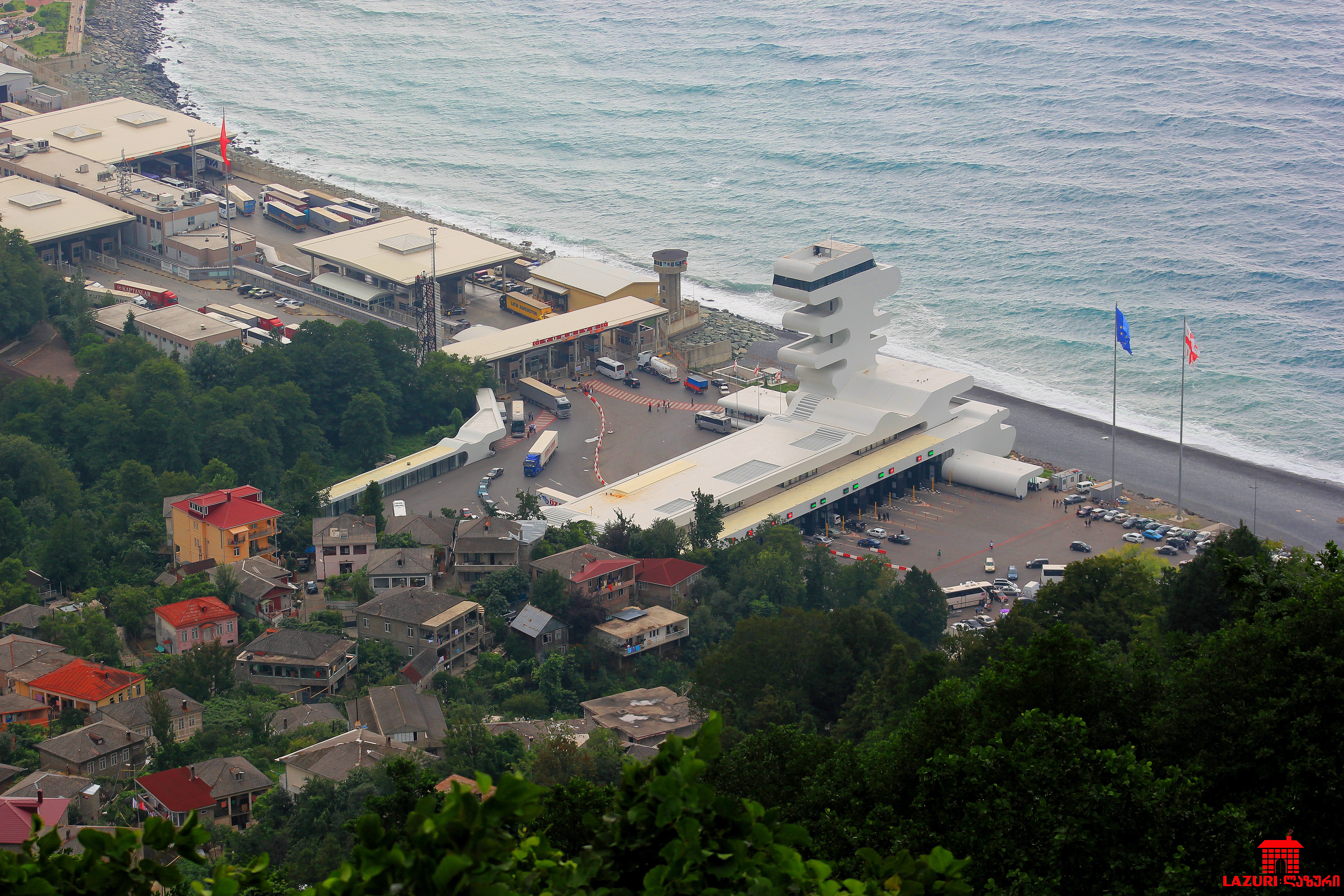
Turkish-Georgian border in Sarpi

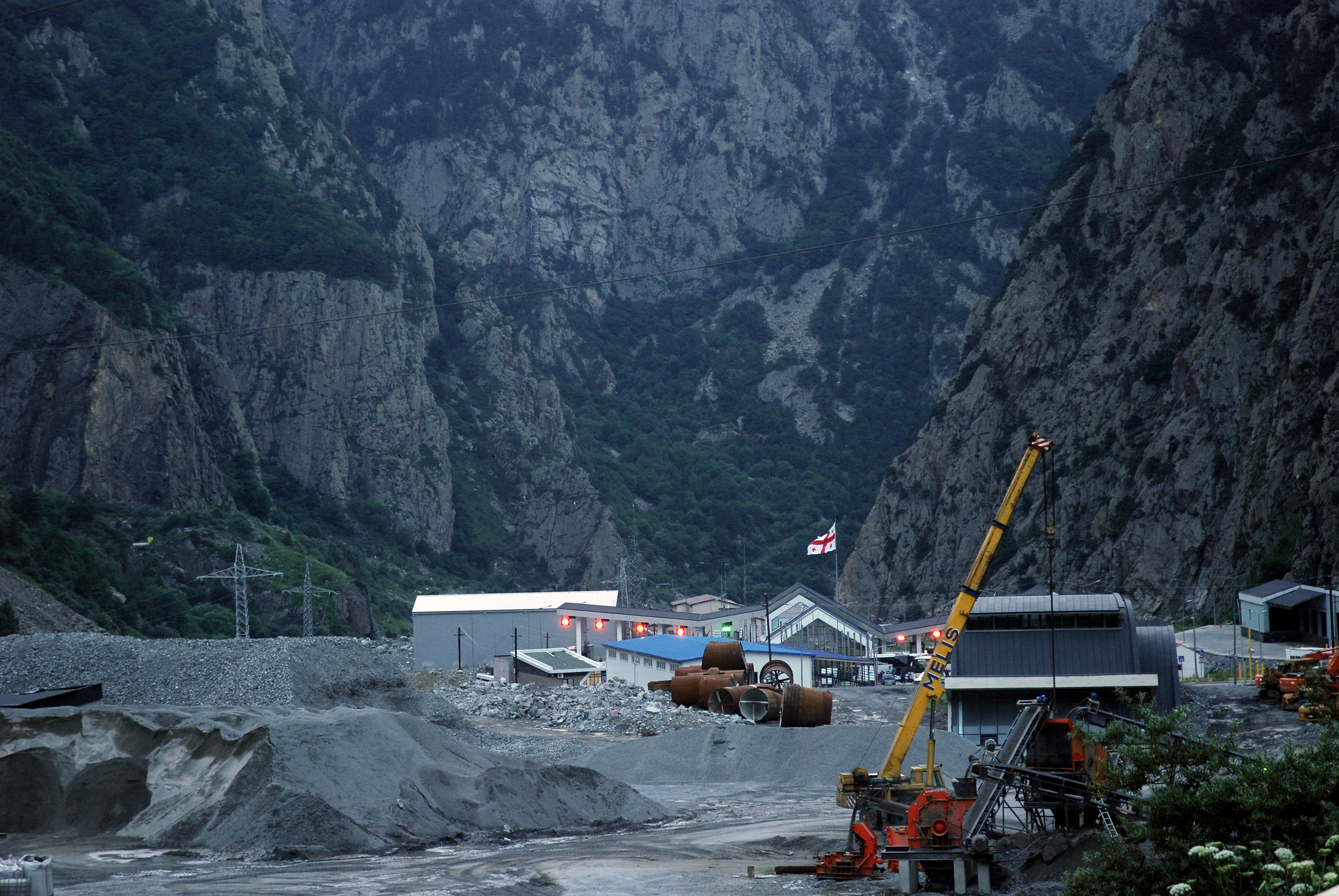
Georgian-Russian border in Darial Gorge (Stepantsminda)

Country	Highway	Municipality	Region
(Turkey) Turkish border	ს 2 / E70	Khelvachauri	Adjara
(Turkey) Turkish border	ს 8 / E691	Akhaltsikhe	Samtskhe-Javakheti
(Turkey) Turkish border	ს 13	Akhalkalaki	Samtskhe-Javakheti
(Armenia) Armenian border	ს 11 / E691	Ninotsminda	Samtskhe-Javakheti
(Armenia) Armenian border	ს 6 / E117	Dmanisi	Kvemo Kartli
(Armenia) Armenian border	შ 37	Marneuli	Kvemo Kartli
(Armenia) Armenian border	ს 7 / E001	Marneuli	Kvemo Kartli
(Azerbaijan) Azerbaijani border	ს 4 / E60	Marneuli	Kvemo Kartli
(Azerbaijan) Azerbaijani border	შ 66	Gardabani	Kvemo Kartli
(Azerbaijan) Azerbaijani border	შ 173	Dedoplistskaro	Kakheti
(Azerbaijan) Azerbaijani border	ს 5	Lagodekhi	Kakheti
(Russia) Russian border	ს 3 / E117	Stepantsminda	Mtskheta-Mtianeti
(Russia) Russian border	ს 10	Java	Shida Kartli
(Russia) Russian border	ს 1 / E97	Gagra	Abkhazia

== See also ==
- (doc) Complete official list of Georgian Highways - 2022 update as attached to resolution 372, 18 July 2022.
- Roads Department of the Ministry of Regional Development and Infrastructure of Georgia
