= S13 highway (Georgia) =

Trunk road in Georgia

S13
- საერთაშორისო 13
- Akhalkalaki-Kartsakhi

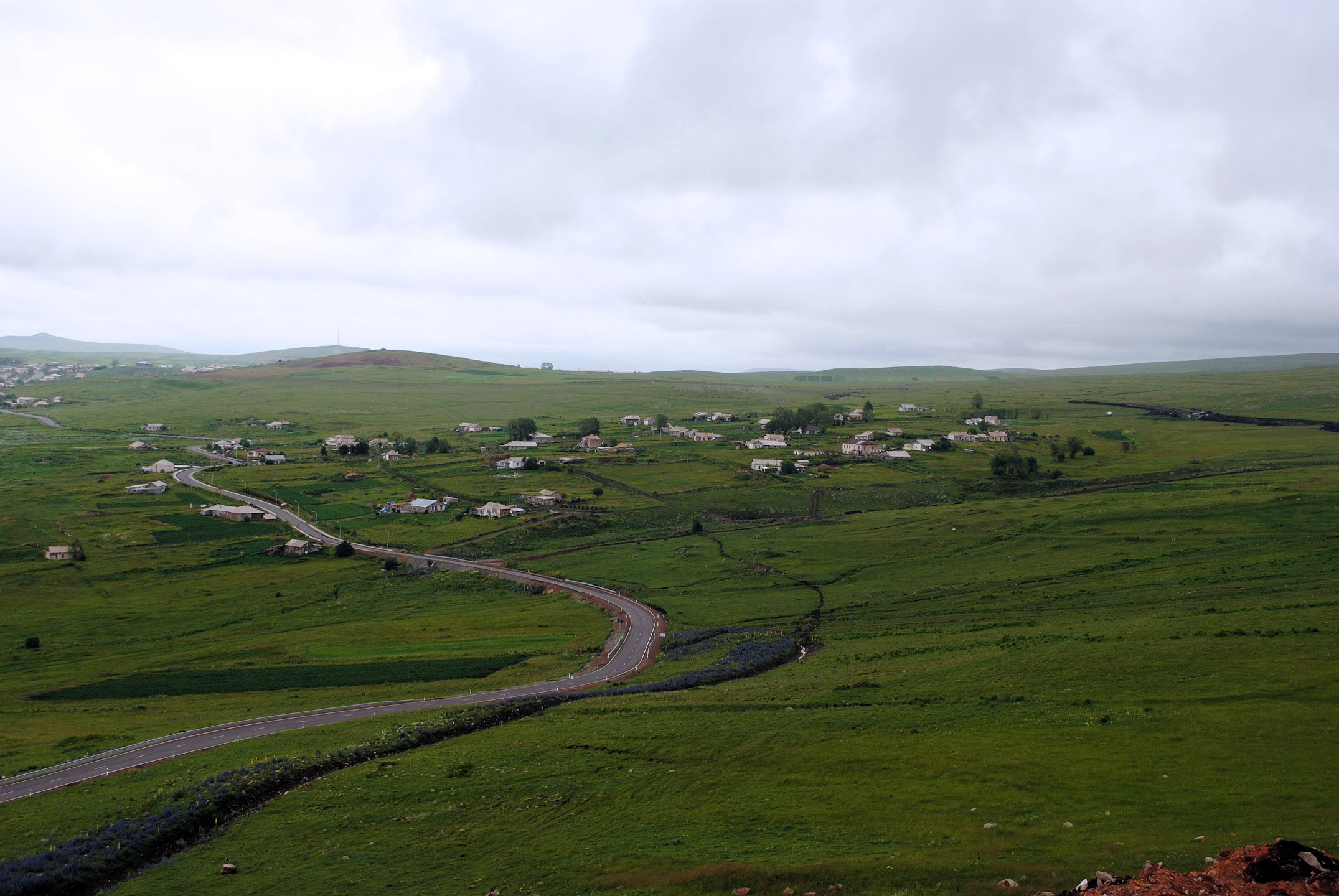
- S13 runs across the Javakheti Plateau

Route information
- Length: 36.5 km (22.7 mi)
- Existed: 2011–present

Major junctions
- North end: Akhalkalaki
- 3 Sh21 Ninotsminda
- South end: Turkish border (Kartsakhi (Turkey)

Location
- Georgia
- Municipalities: Akhalkalaki

Highway system
- Roads in Georgia; International Routes; National Routes

The S13 route (Georgian: საერთაშორისო მნიშვნელობის გზა ს13, Saertashoriso mnishvnelobis gza S13, road of international importance), also known as "Akhalkalaki-Kartsakhi", is a 36.5 kilometres (22.7 mi) highway route of "international importance" in southern Georgia from Akhalkalaki to the Turkish border near Kartsakhi. The route branches off from the S11/E691 highway on the northside of Akhalkalaki. It is a simple (two-lane) asphalt road through the highlands that are characteristic for the Samtskhe–Javakheti region. The road starts at 1700 m (5600 ft) above sea level and gradually climbs to 1970 m (6460 ft) before reaching the Turkish border at 1820 m (5970 ft), the 3rd highest border checkpoint in Georgia next to Georgia's 2nd largest lake (Kartsakhi Lake). After the Turkish border, the road continues to the Turkish D010 at Çıldır. It is the shortest route from Armenia to Turkey, shortcutting the E691 route.

== Background ==
Prior to the 1996 revision of the road classification system the route of the S13 was unnumbered. In 1996 the route was designated as "Sh21 Akhalkalaki - Kartsakhi (Turkish border)". In 2011 the Sh21 got promoted to S13 when Georgia and Turkey renewed discussions on establishing a Kartsakhi-Aktaş border crossing. Construction of the Baku–Tbilisi–Kars railway prompted the reactivation in 2010 of a 1990s intention for such border crossing. (Note: In 2010 Turkey and Georgia signed a Memorandum of Understanding and a subsequent Agreement to streamline border and customs cooperation which included a Kartsakhi - Çıldır-Aktaş checkpoint. This became a priority when construction of the Baku–Tbilisi–Kars railway was ongoing for which a new Akhalkalaki-Kartsakhi-Kars cross-border railway line was built. The BTK railway line opened in 2017.) The border crossing eventually opened in 2015 as third Georgian vehicular crossing into Turkey, 20 years after it was initially agreed upon between the two countries.

The Akhalkalaki - Kartsakhi route has been promoted as an important gateway to Turkey, not in the least for Armenia. It shortens travelling from Armenia to Turkey with 57 km compared to the E691 (S11/S8) route through the Vale border crossing saving more than an hour travel time. When taking into account both routes join each other in Turkey near Ardahan (D010/E691) travel time is reduced by up to two hours. The new connection to Turkey was therefore elevated to a road of "international importance", the Georgian definition of S-roads.

=== Bypass ===
In 2014 the 2.3 km Akhalkalaki Bypass opened, shortening the distance between Turkey and Armenia with 4 km while keeping transit traffic outside of Akhalkalaki town. The Sh21 road number was assigned to the bypass in 2011.

== Future ==
As of 2021 there are no concrete plans to upgrade the S13, while on the Turkish side the D010 between Kars and Çıldır and the last part to the Georgian border are being upgraded to four lane roads.

== Route ==
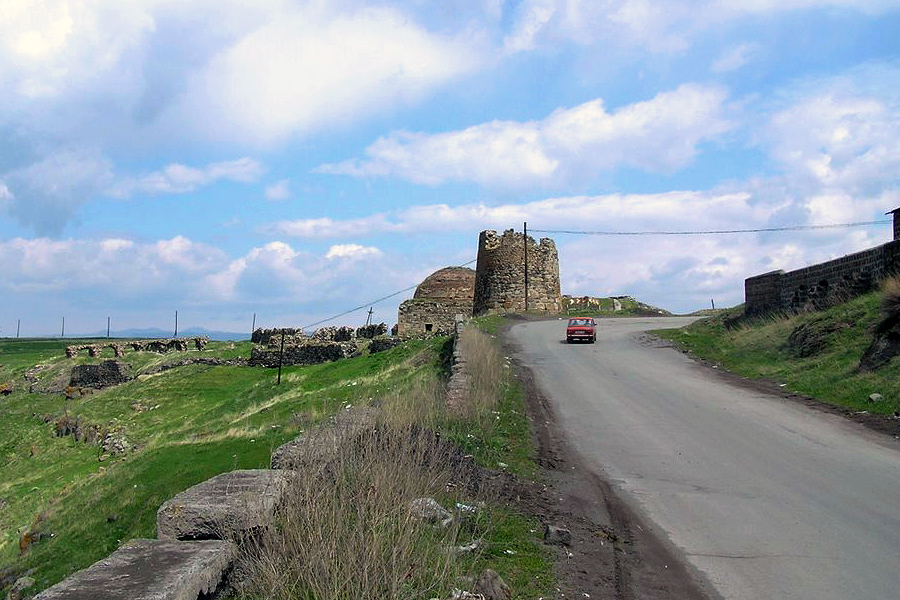
North terminus S13 at Akhalkalaki Castle

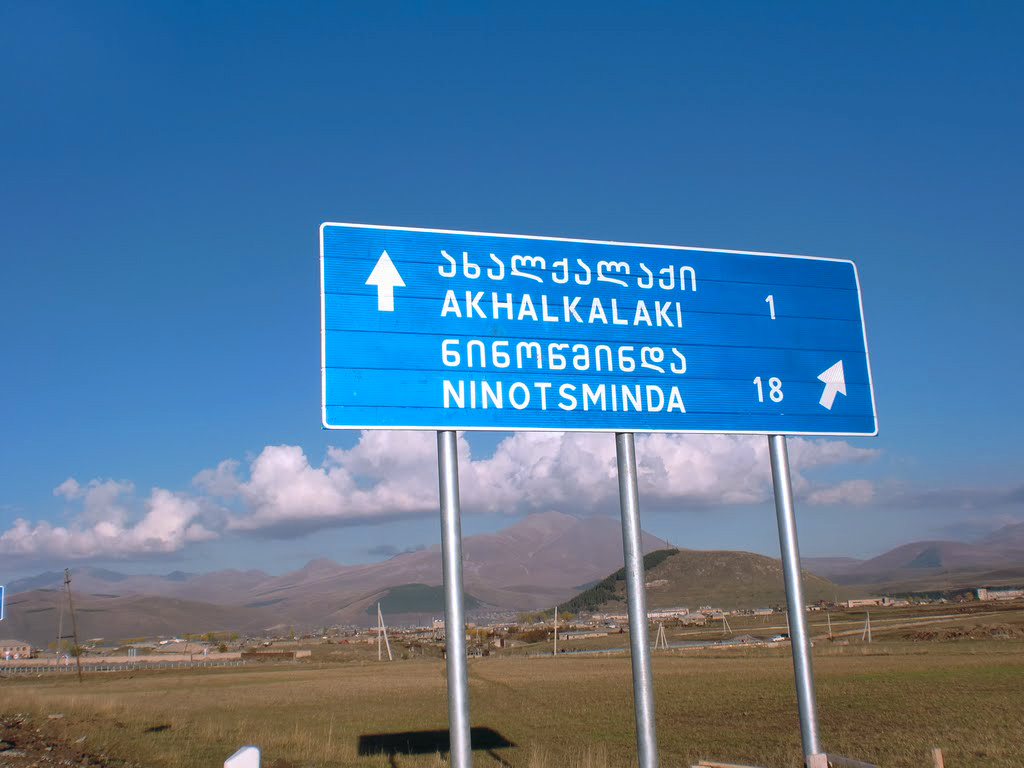
Akhalkalaki Bypass Road, shortcut to Ninotsminda and Armenian border.

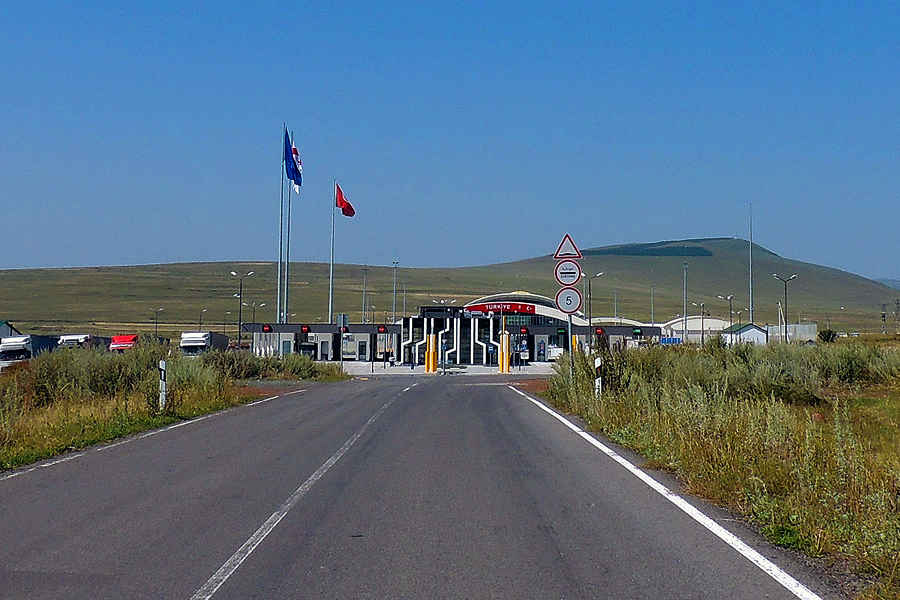
West terminus S13: Kartsakhi border checkpoint

The S13 highway is one of the shortest S-routes in Georgia and begins near the Akhalkalaki Castle at the turn of the S11 highway) into the centre of town. The S13 goes straight to the ruins of the historic castle on the cliff and then makes a sharp turn to the left, passing Akhalkalaki on the West side following the Kirkhbulaki River. The road passes the former Soviet/Russian military base, which has been in use again since 2020 as a training center for the Georgian armed forces and quickly heads out of town where it meets the Akhalkalaki Bypass for traffic between Turkey and Armenia. Akhalkalaki is located at the northern edge of the Javakheti Plateau at an altitude of 1700 m (5600 ft) above sea level. The route runs through typical flat plateau landscape with a slight incline towards Turkey and moderately high mountains visible in the wider surroundings. The area along the route is dotted with small alpine lakes and wetlands. One of which is in Vachiani village through which the route passes.

Further West, near Sulda village, the road climbs a step in the highland plateau to 1900 m (6200 ft) asl entering the Sulda Managed Reserve wetlands after which the road makes another step. The S13 reaches its highest point of 1970 m (6460 ft) as it meets the Baku–Tbilisi–Kars railway at their closest distance. The highway then gradually descents into Kartsakhi village and passes Georgia's 2nd largest lake Kartsakhi Lake which is part of the Javakheti National Park before reaching the Turkish border at 1820 m (5970 ft) above sea level.

== Intersections ==
The route is entirely located in Akhalkalaki Municipality (Samtskhe–Javakheti region)

Municipality	km	mi		Destinations	Route	Notes
Akhalkalaki	0	0.0	Right junction	Akhaltsikhe Ninotsminda / Armenia	S11 highway (Georgia) European route E691 AH82	
Akhalkalaki	1	0.62	Crosses Kirkhbulaki River			
Akhalkalaki	2.5	1.6	Akhalkalaki town limits			
Akhalkalaki	3	1.9	Left junction	Ninotsminda	Roads in Georgia (country)	Akhalkalaki Bypass
Akhalkalaki	24	15	Unnamed pass 1970 m (6460 ft)			
Akhalkalaki	36	22	(Turkey) Turkish border checkpoint. Road continues as 75-02 and 75-01 to Çıldır			
1.000 mi = 1.609 km; 1.000 km = 0.621 mi
