= S11 highway (Georgia) =

Trunk road in Georgia

S11
- საერთაშორისო 11
- Akhaltsikhe-Ninotsminda

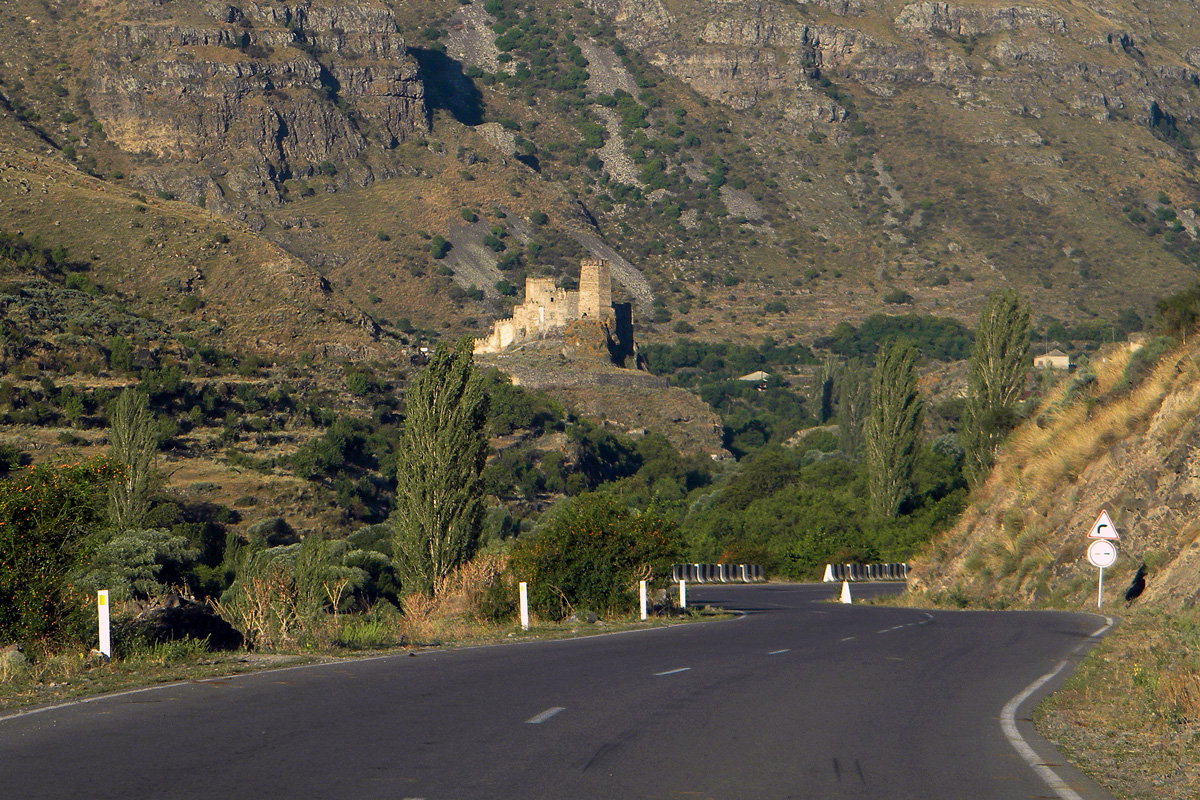
- S11 highway follows Paravani / Kura river gorges

Route information
- Part of
- Length: 112 km (70 mi)

Major junctions
- North end: Akhaltsikhe
- (km) 0 S8 (Borjomi / (Turkey) ) 44 Sh58 (Vardzia) 67 Sh20 (Bakuriani / Borjomi) 69 S13 (Kartsakhi / (Turkey) ) 73 Sh21 (bypass road) 90 Sh31 (Tsalka)
- South end: Armenian border (Armenia)

Location
- Georgia
- Municipalities: Akhaltsikhe, Aspindza, Akhalkalaki, Ninotsminda
- Major cities: Akhaltsikhe

Highway system
- Roads in Georgia; International Routes; National Routes

The Georgian S11 route (Georgian: საერთაშორისო მნიშვნელობის გზა ს11, Saertashoriso mnishvnelobis gza S11, road of international importance), also known as Akhaltsikhe - Ninotsminda (Armenian border), is a "road of international importance" within the Georgian system and runs from Akhaltsikhe via Akhalkalaki to the border with Armenia near Ninotsminda covering 112 kilometres (70 mi). After crossing the Georgia–Armenia border the highway continues as M1 to Gyumri, Armenia's second largest city. The entire two-lane S11 is part of the European E691 and Asian AH82 routes and connects with two other Georgian S-highways. The road is located entirely in the Samtskhe–Javakheti region which is geographically an extension of the Armenian Highlands, and reaches a maximum altitude of 2,150 metres (7,050 ft) above sea level without passing any mountain passes. The high altitude plains between Akhalkalaki and the Armenian border have a harsh winter climate, leading to frequent road closures due to high snow.

== Background ==
Since the early 1980s the current S11 route was part of the Soviet A306 national route that ran from Batumi via Akhaltsikhe and Ninotsminda to Gyumri (Armenia). Prior to the 1980s, the route did not have a centralized designation, as was the case with most main Soviet routes. When Georgia's road numbering system was revised in 1996, the "roads of international importance" (S)-category was introduced and the A306 designation was replaced by "S11 Akhaltsikhe - Ninotsminda (Armenian border)". The A306 section between Batumi and Akhaltsikhe became the Sh1 ("route of national importance", a lower class).

The S11 is an important transit route for traffic from Armenia to Turkey and vice versa, since the landborder between both countries is closed. In earlier years most traffic would travel via Vale at the Georgia–Turkey border, the terminus of the S8 highway which the S11 joins in Akhaltsikhe. Since 2015 a shorter route is available via the S13 highway from Akhalkalaki. Also, Georgia's Armenian community primarily lives in the Samtskhe–Javakheti region, especially in the municipalities of Akhalkalaki and Ninotsminda and the S11 plays an important role for the local population to connect with Armenia.

== Future ==
As of 2021 there are no plans to upgrade the S11 highway to higher standards. Most noteworthy is the rehabilitation in 2019 of the Ninotsminda to border section which was in notoriously bad shape.

== Route ==
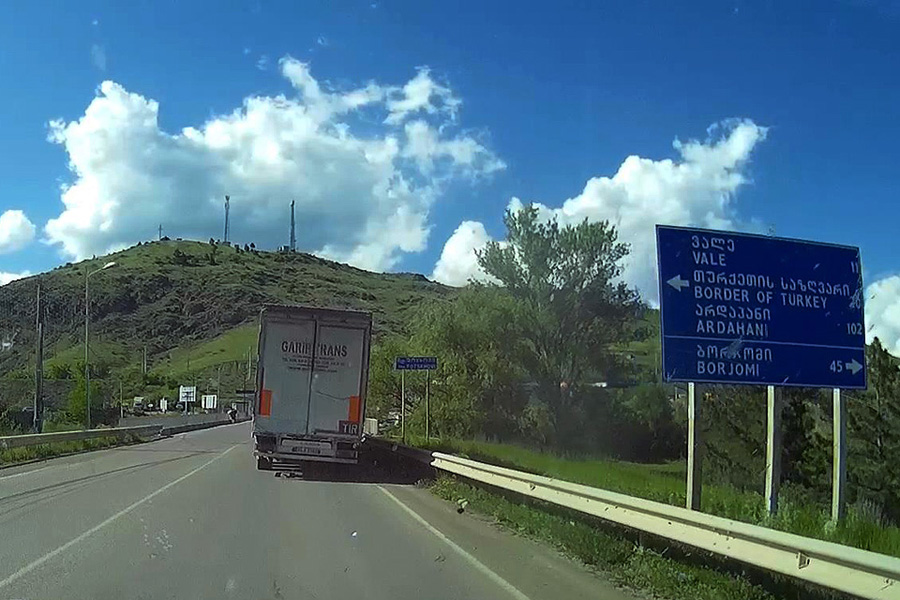
North terminus S11 highway in Akhaltsikhe, junction with S8

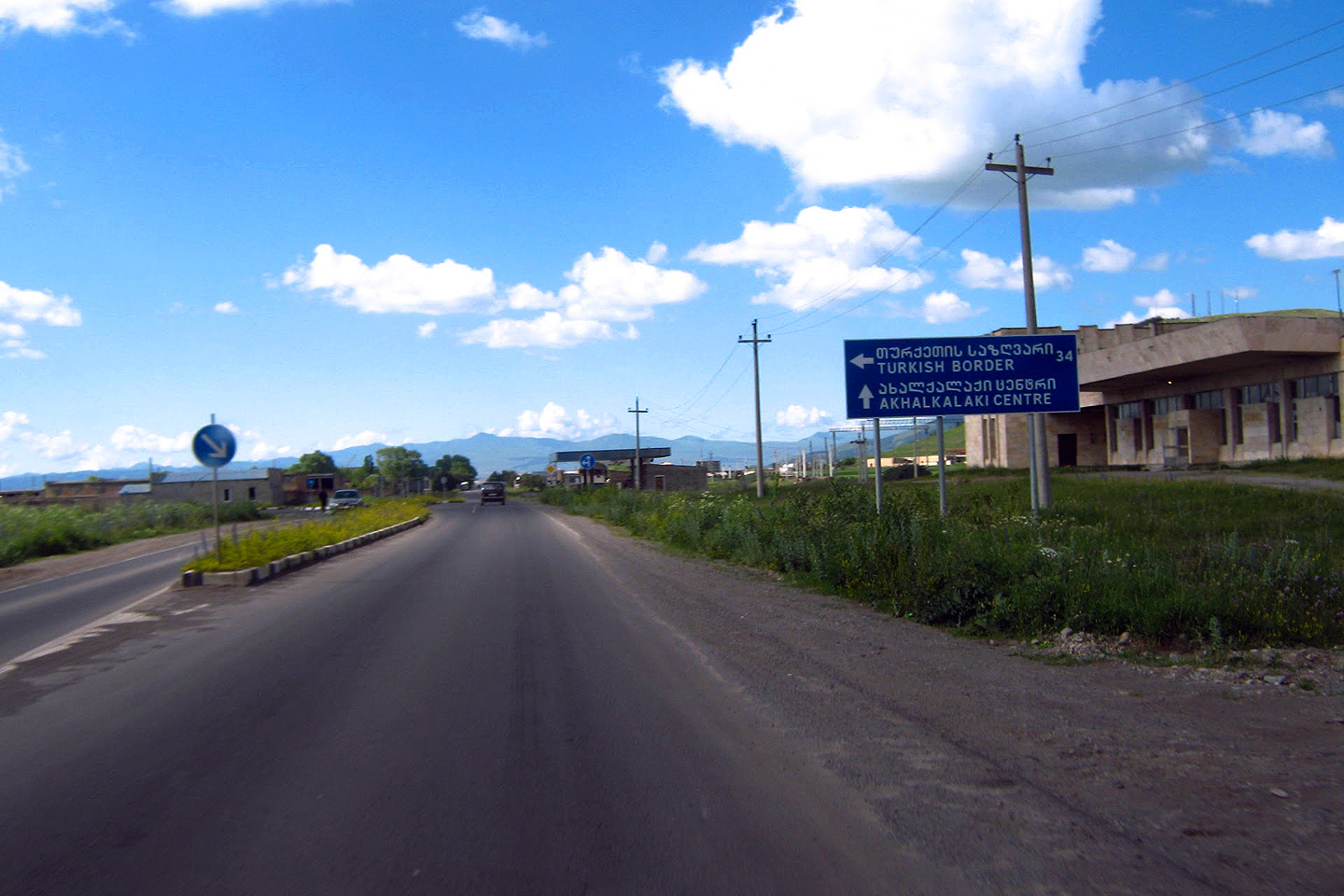
Junction for Akhalkalaki Bypass (Sh21) to Turkey via S13 highway

The Samtskhe-Javakheti region through which the S11 highway runs is geographically part of the Armenian Highlands. Akhaltsikhe, home to the historic Rabati Castle and starting point of the S11 route, is at the lowest point of the route with an elevation of 960 metres (3,150 ft) above sea level. The route starts in the eastern edge of the town at a junction with the S8 highway on the left bank of the Potskhovi River. From here the highway immediately crosses the river and heads south-east through the outskirts of town and joins the Kura south from Chacharaki village. Shortly after at Minadze the road passes to the right bank of the Kura river where it remains for the 39 kilometres (24 mi) upstream until Khertvisi. The road has beautiful river gorge scenery while it gradually climbs, passing a few settlements along the way. At 30 kilometres (19 mi) the road passes through the small town of Aspindza after which the gorge narrows again providing rocky scenery.

The first point of main interest is reached at 44 kilometres (27 mi), at the confluence of the Kura and Paravani rivers. On a rocky hill right above the confluence stands the 10-11th century Khertvisi Fortress, one of Georgia's oldest fortresses. Here is also the junction with the Sh58 road to Vardzia, 16 kilometres (9.9 mi) upstream the Kura river. Vardzia is a historic cave monastery site in the rocks above the Kura and a prime tourist destination in Georgia. From Khertvisi the S11 highway continues its way upstream along the Paravani river to Akhalkalaki, 23 kilometres (14 mi) ahead. The gorge narrows further and the road climbs from 1,150 metres (3,770 ft) to 1,650 metres (5,410 ft) at the foot of Akhalkalaki. The road then winds up the plateau on which Akhalkalaki is situated. Just before turning into the centre of town the S11 meets the S13 highway, the road to the Turkish border at Kartsakhi.

The S11 highway then passes through the main street of Akhalkalaki, and makes its way out via its southern neighbours, the villages of Martuni and Khospio. Halfway between Akhalkalaki and Ninotsminda the highway meets the Baku–Tbilisi–Kars railway line and the large switchyard for the break of gauge bogie exchange. The S11 passes alongside the railway site and the brand new railway station. Upon entering Ninotsminda the railway line and highway separate again. In the centre of Ninotsminda one of the few noteworthy junctions in the S11 can be found, the Sh31 state route leading to Tbilisi via Tsalka. After Ninotsminda it is 23 kilometres (14 mi) in southeast direction to the Armenian border. Meanwhile the road gradually climbs to its highest point of 2,150 metres (7,050 ft) at the Georgia–Armenia border, Georgia's highest border crossing. This is also the highest point of the Armenian M1 highway into which the S11 continues.

== Intersections ==
The route is located in the Samtskhe–Javakheti region and overlaps entirely with the E691 and AH82 routes.

Municipality	km	mi		Destinations	Route	Notes
Akhaltsikhe	0	0.0	Left junction	Borjomi / Tbilisi Vale / Ardahan ( (Turkey) )	S8 highway (Georgia) AH82 European route E691	Highway to Turkish border
Akhaltsikhe	0	0.0	Crosses Potskhovi River (90 m)			
Akhaltsikhe	2	1.2	Akhaltsikhe city limits			
Akhaltsikhe	5	3.1	Crosses Kura (Mtkvari) River (130 m)			
Aspindza	44	27	Right junction	Vardzia	Roads in Georgia (country)	
Akhalkalaki	68	42	Left junction	Bakuriani	Roads in Georgia (country)	
Akhalkalaki	68	42	Crosses Paravani River (130 m)			
Akhalkalaki	69	43	Akhalkalaki town limits			
Akhalkalaki	69	43	Left junction	Kartsakhi	S13 highway (Georgia)	Highway to Turkish border (Turkey)
Akhalkalaki	73	45	Right junction	Border (Turkey)	Roads in Georgia (country)	Akhalkalaki Bypass
Akhalkalaki	73	45	Akhalkalaki town limits			
Ninotsminda	87	54	Ninotsminda town limits			
Ninotsminda	90	56	Left junction		Tsalka	
Ninotsminda	91	57	Ninotsminda town limits			
Ninotsminda	112	70	(Armenia) Armenian border checkpoint. Road continues as) to Gyumri			
1.000 mi = 1.609 km; 1.000 km = 0.621 mi

== Gallery ==
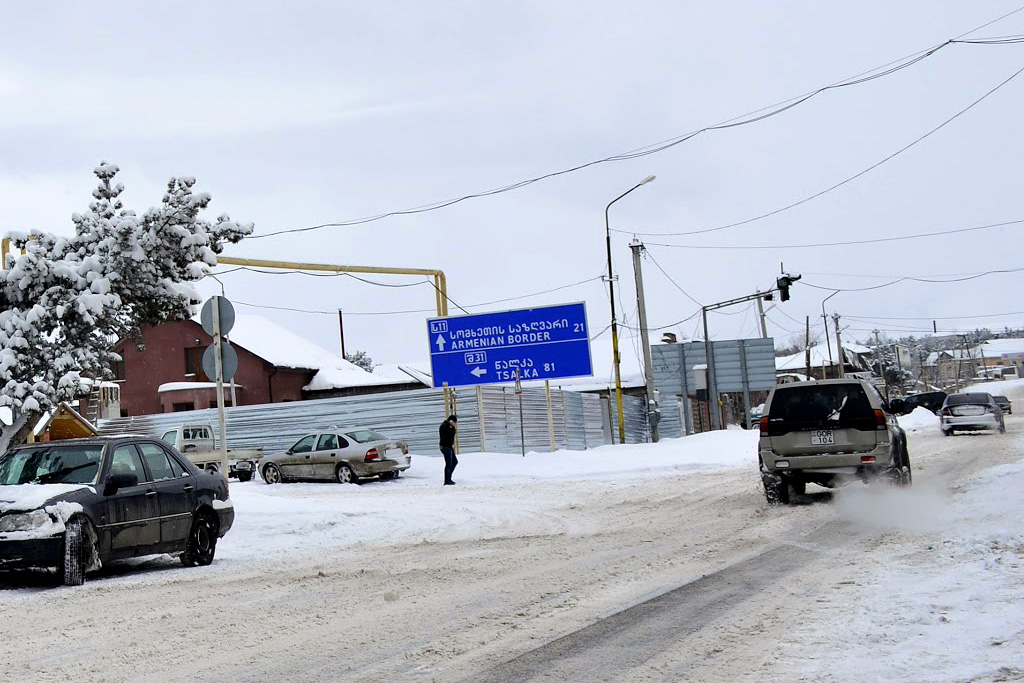
Junction with Sh31 in wintery Ninotsminda

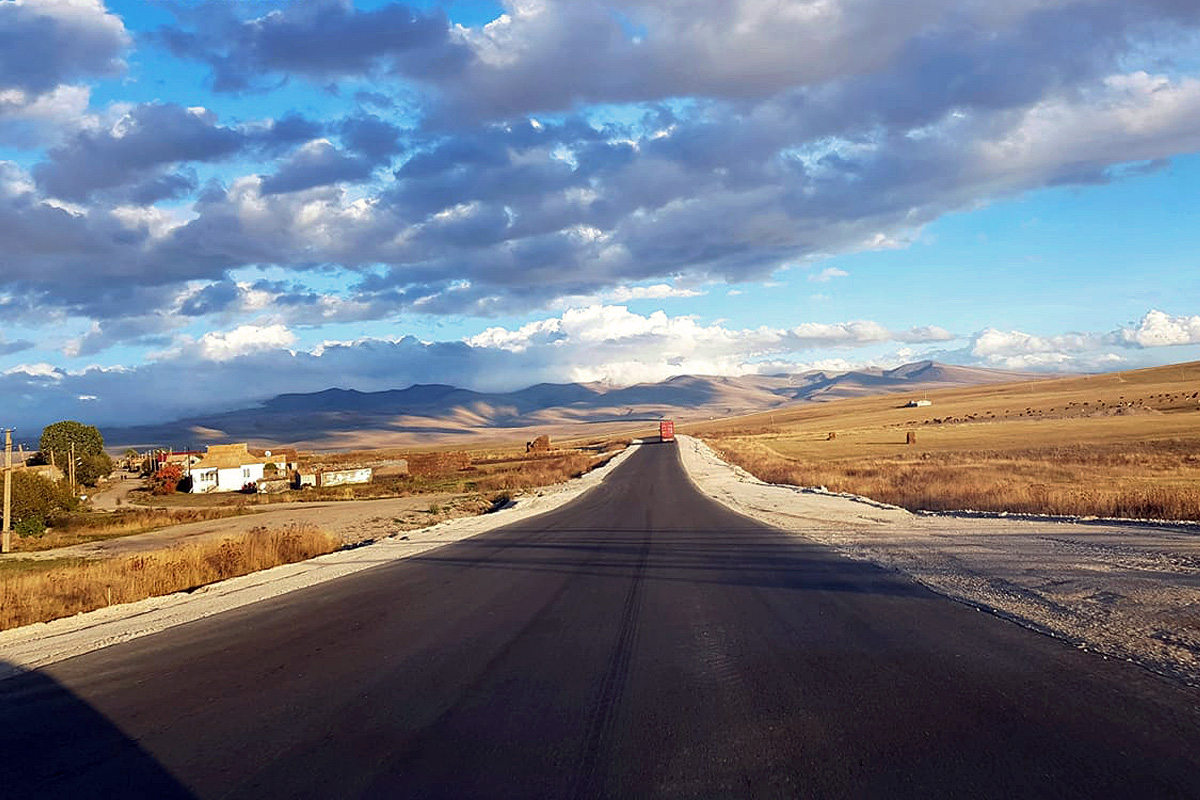
S11 through Samtskhe-Javakheti highlands near Armenian border

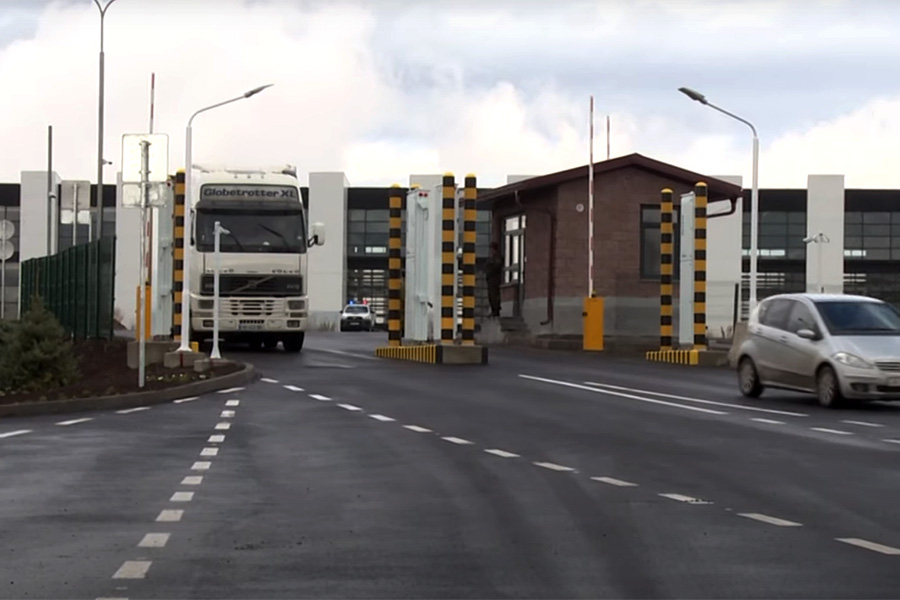
Ninotsminda-Bavra border crossing, south terminus S11
