= S8 highway (Georgia) =

Trunk road in Georgia

S8
- საერთაშორისო 8
- Khashuri-Akhaltsikhe-Vale

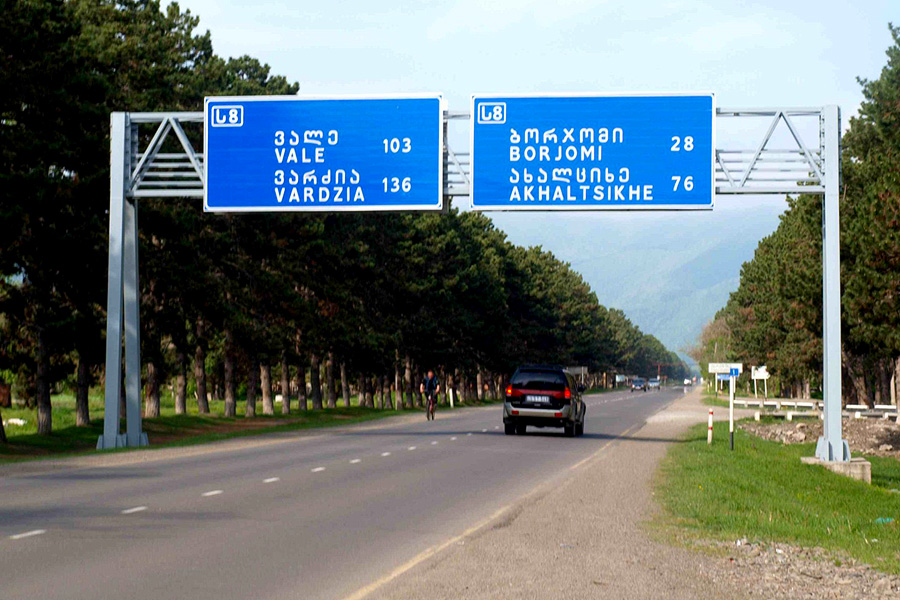
- Georgian highway S8 starts in Khashuri

Route information
- Part of
- Length: 97 km (60 mi)

Major junctions
- North end: Khashuri
- (km) 26 Sh20 to Bakuriani 28 Sh127 to Sadgeri / Tba 76 S11 to (Armenia) 80 Sh1 to Adigeni and Batumi
- South end: Turkish border (Vale) (Turkey)

Location
- Georgia
- Municipalities: Khashuri, Borjomi, Akhaltsikhe, Adigeni

Highway system
- Roads in Georgia; International Routes; National Routes

The Georgian S8 route (Georgian: საერთაშორისო მნიშვნელობის გზა ს8, Saertashoriso mnishvnelobis gza S8, road of international importance), also known as Khashuri–Akhaltsikhe-Vale (border of the Republic of Turkey), is a "road of international importance" within the Georgian system and runs from Khashuri via Borjomi and Akhaltsikhe to the border with Turkey near Vale over a distance of 97 kilometres (60 mi). After crossing the Georgia–Turkey border the highway continues as D955 to Ardahan. The S8 is a two lane road and is part of European route E691 between Akhaltsikhe and the Turkish border, and part of the Asian Highway AH82 between Khashuri and Akhaltsikhe. It connects with the Georgian S11 highway in Akhaltsikhe. The road is mostly located in the Samtskhe–Javakheti region, while its Khashuri segment is located in the Shida Kartli region. The S8 highway route follows the Kura river through its gorge until Akhaltsikhe and reaches a maximum altitude of 1230 metres (4040 ft) above sea level at the Georgia–Turkey border.

== Background ==
From the early 1980s to 1996 the current S8 route between Khashuri and Akhaltsikhe was referred to as A308 within the Soviet road network. The A308 connected the M27 Soviet highway (now Georgian S1 highway) in Khashuri with the A306 in Akhaltsikhe which ran between Batumi and Gyumri (Armenia). The latter included a 3 kilometres (1.9 mi) section West of Akhaltsikhe that is nowadays part of the S8. The remainder of the current S8 between the junction to Batumi and the Turkish border was unnumbered. Prior to the 1980s the route was unnumbered as was the case with most Soviet roads.

When Georgia's road numbering system was revised in 1996 the "roads of international importance" (S-)category was introduced. The "S8 Khashuri - Akhaltsikhe - Vale (border of the Republic of Turkey)" replaced the A308 designation with an additional 18 kilometres (11 mi) from Akhaltsikhe to the Turkish border. This included a 3 kilometres (1.9 mi) section that was formerly part of the A306 route.

The S8 is an important route for traffic to the Samtskhe–Javakheti region and tourist destinations Borjomi and Bakuriani. Prior to the opening of the Kartsakhi Georgia–Turkey border crossing via the S13 highway the Vale border crossing played an important role in transit traffic between Turkey and Armenia. Yet, the S8 still plays an important role for through traffic between Georgia and (East-)Turkey. While the Sh1 state highway to Batumi offers a southern connection from the S8 at Akhaltsikhe to the Autonomous Republic of Adjara, the dilapidated state of that road in the highlands west of Adigeni reduces its practical use.

Until 2020 the S1 and S8 highways connected directly in the center of Khashuri. In summer 2020 the Khashuri Bypass in the S1 highway opened, which means the S1 bypasses Khashuri between the Agarebi intersection and Surami. The old S1 section from Agarebi into Khashuri and Surami does not have a new road number as of 2021, but inclusion in the Sh203 can be anticipated. The Sh203 was introduced to reassign the old S1 route between Kareli and Agarebi.

== Future ==
As of 2021 there are no plans to upgrade the S8 highway to higher standards, nor are there any plans to bypass Khashuri between the S1 and S8 highways. For the foreseeable future transit traffic will have to continue to pass through Khashuri town.

== Route ==
S8 near Borjomi

The Samtskhe-Javakheti region through which the S8 highway mostly runs is part of the Armenian Highlands which defines the geography of the area. The S8 highway follows the Kura river gorge to Akhaltsikhe and gradually climbs from 700 metres (2300 ft) above sea level in Khashuri to 1230 metres (4040 ft) at the Georgia–Turkey border. In a 10 kilometres (6.2 mi) radius around the highway the mountains reach to 2500 metres (8200 ft) above sea level.

The S8 highway starts at the main roundabout in the center of Khashuri, formerly the junction of the S1 and S8 highways. Khashuri is known among passers-by for its hammocks sold along the through road in town. At Kviskheti village the S8 joins the left bank of the Kura river and enters the river gorge, leaving behind the plain around Khashuri. The curvy road passes through a handful of villages and reaches Georgia's prime tourist destination Borjomi after 26 kilometres (16 mi). In Borjomi the 82 kilometres (51 mi) long Sh20 state route leads to Bakuriani skiresort and terminates in Akhalkalaki via the 2,454 metres (8,051 ft) high Tskhratskaro Pass in the Ktsia-Tabatskuri Managed Reserve.

After passing through Borjomi the S8 continues to Akhaltsikhe, the next main town 49 kilometres (30 mi) ahead through the Kura river gorge. Shortly before reaching Akhaltsikhe the highway and Kura river separate while the river gorge widens to a valley. In Akhaltsikhe the S8 intersects with the northern terminus of the S11 highway while prominent direction signs for the Turkish and Armenian border indicate the international dimension of both highways. This is also the point of overlap with the E691 route which connects Turkey and Armenia through Georgia via the S8 and S11 highways.

The highway then passes through the central area of the Akhaltsikhe, along the (defunct) railway station and the access road to the local tourist attraction, Rabati Castle. A few kilometers West of Akhaltsikhe the East terminus of the Sh1 state route to Batumi junctions with the S8 highway. For the remaining 15 kilometres (9.3 mi) the S8 climbs up to the Turkish border via Vale town and becomes the Turkish D955 after the border.

== Intersections ==
Region	Municipality	km	mi		Destinations	Route	Notes
Shida Kartli	Khashuri	0	0.0	Roundabout	Poti / Batumi Tbilisi / Tsiteli Khidi (Red Bridge)		North end AH82 concurrency
Shida Kartli	Khashuri	1	0.62	Khashuri city limits			
Samtskhe–Javakheti	Borjomi	24	15	Borjomi city limits			
Samtskhe–Javakheti	Borjomi	26	16	Left junction	Bakuriani	Roads in Georgia (country)	
Samtskhe–Javakheti	Borjomi	28	17	Left junction	Sadgeri / Tba / Tsemi		
Samtskhe–Javakheti	Borjomi	34	21	Borjomi city limits			
Samtskhe–Javakheti	Akhaltsikhe	56	35	Atskuri Fortress			
Samtskhe–Javakheti	Akhaltsikhe	60	37	Crosses Khashuri-Borjomi-Akhaltsikhe railway line			
Samtskhe–Javakheti	Akhaltsikhe	71	44	Crosses Khashuri-Borjomi-Akhaltsikhe railway line			
Samtskhe–Javakheti	Akhaltsikhe	73	45	Akhaltsikhe city limits			
Samtskhe–Javakheti	Akhaltsikhe	76	47	Left junction	Ninotsminda / Armenia	S11 highway (Georgia) European route E691	South end AH82, North end E691 concurrence
Samtskhe–Javakheti	Akhaltsikhe	77	48	Right junction		Rabati Castle	
Samtskhe–Javakheti	Akhaltsikhe	79	49	Akhaltsikhe city limits			
Samtskhe–Javakheti	Akhaltsikhe	80	50	Right junction	Adigeni / Batumi	Roads in Georgia (country)	via Goderdzi Pass (2027 metres (6650 ft))
Samtskhe–Javakheti	Akhaltsikhe	80	50	Crosses Potskhovi River (70 m)			
Samtskhe–Javakheti	Akhaltsikhe	92	57	Crosses Potskhovi River (70 m)			
Samtskhe–Javakheti	Adigeni	96	60	(Turkey) Turkish border checkpoint. Road continues as to Ardahan. South end E691 concurrence.			
1.000 mi = 1.609 km; 1.000 km = 0.621 mi: Concurrency terminus
