= Akhalkalaki Municipality =

Coordinates: 41°24′20″N 43°29′10″E

Akhalkalaki Municipality ახალქალაქის მუნიციპალიტეტი
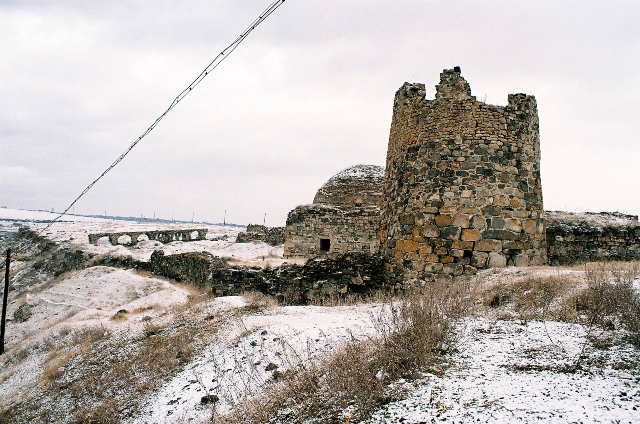
- Akhalkalaki fortress

- Flag Seal

- Country: Georgia
- Mkhare: Samtskhe-Javakheti
- Administrative centre: Akhalkalaki

Government
  - Type: Mayor–Council
  - Mayor: Melqon Makarian (GD)
  - Municipal Assembly: 42 members: • Georgian Dream (37); • United National Movement (2); • European Georgia (2); • Lelo for Georgia (1)

Area
  - Total: 1,235 km^{2} (477 sq mi)

Population (2021)
  - Total: 41,026
  - Density: 33.22/km^{2} (86.04/sq mi)
- Time zone: UTC+4 (Georgian Time)

Akhalkalaki (Georgian: ახალქალაქის მუნიციპალიტეტი, Akhalkalakis munitsip’alit’et’i) is a municipality in southern Georgia, in the region of Samtskhe-Javakheti with a population of 41,026 (2021). Its main town and administrative center is Akhalkalaki and it has an area of 1,235 km^{2} (477 sq mi). 93% of the inhabitants in Akhalkalaki are of Armenian descent, the second highest amount in a Georgian municipality after Ninotsminda.

In the municipality is the Kumurdo Cathedral and the Baraleti church.

== Geography ==
Akhalkalaki Municipality is bordered to the west by Akhaltsikhe Municipality, north by the municipalities of Tsalka and Borjomi, and southeast by Ninotsminda. The southwest border of the municipality is shared by neighboring Turkey.

=== Administrative divisions ===
Akhalkalaki municipality is administratively divided into one city (the municipal centre Akhalkalaki) and 21 communities (თემი, temi) with 64 villages (სოფელი, sopeli).

== Politics ==
Akhalkalaki Municipal Assembly (Georgian: ახალქალაქის საკრებულო, Akhalkalaki Sakrebulo) is the representative body in Akhalkalaki Municipality, consisting of 42 members which are elected every four years. The last election was held in October 2021. Melqon Makarian of Georgian Dream was elected mayor.

Party	2017	2021	Current Municipal Assembly
Georgian Dream	31	35	
United National Movement		2	
European Georgia	1	2	
People's Power		2 (Note: Split from Georgian Dream.)	
Lelo		1	
Alliance of Patriots	5		
Free Georgia	1		
Total	38	42	

== Population ==
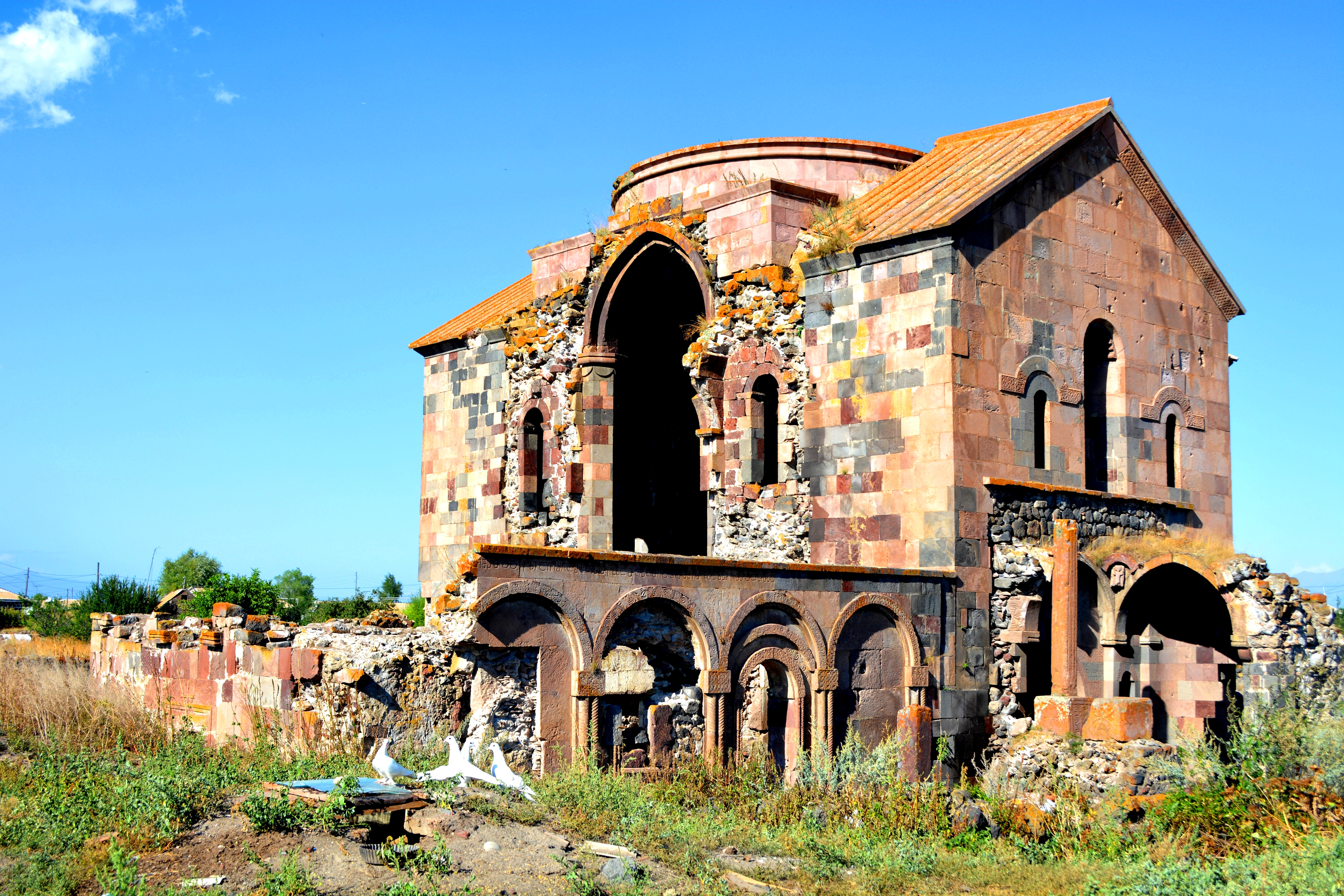
Kumurdo Cathedral

By the start of 2021 the population was determined at 41,026 people, a decrease of 9% compared to the 2014 census. The population of the city of Akhalkalaki decreased with 6% during the same period. The population density of the municipality is 33.2 inhabitants per square kilometre (86/sq mi).

The vast majority (93%) of the population of Akhalkalaki are Armenians, which makes Akhalkalaki the 2nd most Armenian populated Georgian municipality, after its neighbour Nonotsminda. The remaining 7% are nearly exclusively Georgians. There are a few dozen Russians and Greeks. In terms of religion, 79% of the population consists of followers of the Armenian Apostolic Church, followed by Catholics (12%) and Georgian Orthodox Church (6%). Furthermore, there are small numbers of Jehovah's Witnesses, Protestants and Jews.

Population Akhalkalaki Municipality
	1897	1922	1926	1939	1959	1970	1979	1989	2002	2014	2021
Akhalkalaki Municipality	-	-	-	64,655	▼62,977	▲69,992	▼68,234	▲69,256	▼60,975	▼45,070	▼41,026
Akhalkalaki city	5,440	▼2,737	▲3,475	▼5,331	▲8,804	▲10,751	▲13,405	▲15,572	▼9,802	▼8,295	▼7,824
Data: Population statistics Georgia 1897 to present. Note: (Note: The 2014 census found an inexplicable gap with the data from the national statistical office Geostat. UN-assisted research has found the 2002 census was inflated by about 8-9 percent. See, "1. Introduction", Page 1.)

== Transport ==
S11 highway runs through the municipality from Akhalkalaki to Ninotsminda and the Armenia–Georgia border, and is also part of European route E691. The municipality is connected to the capital Tbilisi via Ninotsminda. In Akhalkalaki, S13 branches off from S11 towards the Georgia-Turkey border on the northern shore of Kartsakhi Lake. From Akhalkalaki, the national road Sh20 runs north, over the Trialeti mountain range towards Bakuriani and Boryomi.

Since the 1980s, Akhalkalaki has been the end of a railway line from Marabda via Tetritsqaro, Tsalka, and Ninotsminda. The route was extensively modernized from 2007 to connect to Turkey's network and form part of the new rail connection with Azerbaijan via an extension to Kars.

== See also ==
- List of municipalities in Georgia (country)
