= AH82 =

Road in Asia

Asian Highway 82
- Map of AH82 in red

Route information
- Length: 1,265 km (786 mi)

Major junctions
- North end: Sochi, Russia
- South end: Ivughli, Iran

Location
- Countries: Russia; Georgia; Armenia; Iran

Highway system
- Asian Highway Network
← AH81	→ AH83

Asian Highway 82 (AH82) is a road in the Asian Highway Network running 1265 km (785 miles) from Sochi, Russia to Ivughli, Iran. The Route is Concurrent with European Route E97 The route is as follows:

== Russia ==
- A 147 / E97: Sochi

== Georgia ==
- (under Abkhazia control) S-1 Highway: Leselidze - Sukhumi - Gali (Cuncurrency|E|97)
- S-1 Highway: Zugdidi - Senaki (End of Concurrency|E|97) (Start of concurrency|E|60) - Khashuri
- S-8 Highway: Khashuri - Akhaltsikhe (Start of Concurrency with |E|691|)
- S-11 Highway: Akhaltsikhe -Ninotsminda

== Armenia ==
- : Bavra - Gyumri
  - : Gyumri - Akhurik ( D.060)
- : Gyumri - Ashtarak - Yerevan
- : Yerevan - Yeraskh - Noravan - Kapan - Meghri - Agarak

(End of Concurrency with European Routes)

== Iran ==
- Road 12: Nurduz - Jolfa
- Road 11: Jolfa - Ivughli
