= Liliya Andranikovna Paronyan =

Russian writer, poet and psychologist

Liliya Paronyan
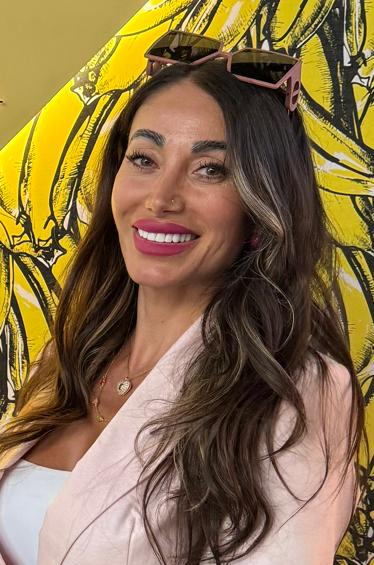
- Born: Liliya Andranikovna Paronyan; September 1, 1983 (age 42); Akhalkalaki, Akhalkalaki Municipality, Georgian SSR, USSR
- Other names: Shushanik Andranikovna Paronyan
- Citizenship: Russia
- Occupations: Writer, poet, psychologist

Liliya Andranikovna Paronyan (Russian: Лилия Андраниковна Паронян, birth name — Shushanik Andranikovna Paronyan, Russian: Шушаник Андраниковна Паронян, Born September 1, 1983, Akhalkalaki, Akhalkalaki Municipality, Georgian SSR, USSR) is a Russian writer, poet and psychologist of Armenian origin, the founder of a new genre "Therapeutic poetry".

For 21 years, she has been the chief accountant of companies: the Russian Society of Sociologists NGO, the Center for Expert Market Research, and others, Member of the Society of Professional Chief Accountants of Russia (IPB of Russia). Since 2020, he has been practicing as a consultant psychologist in a humanistic approach. Member of the International Armenian Literary Alliance and the International Union of Writers, and in October 2023, she became a nominee for the national Poet of the Year 2023 award in three categories: Debut, Lyrics and Poet of the Year.

== Biography ==
Born on September 1, 1983 in the city of Akhalkalaki (Georgia), in a simple working-class family. After graduating from high school, she enrolled in an economics institute, and after graduation, she studied to become a child psychologist. After completing her studies, she moved to Spain. After moving, she opened a joint business with her husband. For 21 years, she has been the chief accountant of companies such as the Russian Society of Sociologists NGO, the Center for Expert Market Research, and others. Member of the Society of Professional Chief Accountants of Russia (IPB of Russia) for more than 10 years.

The first book was published in 2020. Three books "Follow Your Soul!", "Be Yourself!" and "Man of the World" have already been published. Since 2020, he has been practicing as a consultant psychologist in a humanistic approach. He conducts various trainings face-to-face and online, and has been a member of the International Armenian Literary Alliance and the International Union of Writers since the same year. And in October 2023, she became a nominee for the national Poet of the Year 2023 award in three categories: Debut, Lyrics and Poet of the Year.

My meditative poetry is juicy and original, poignant and tender, autobiographically frank and philosophically intimate. My works are, on the one hand, the answer to the existential questions of existence, on the other hand, it is a call for the search for inner balance, balance and peace of everyone living on Earth.

— Lilia Paronian

== Awards ==
- Winner of the Golden Pen of the Russian Literary Award 2024 ("Debut" nomination)
- Winner of the Heritage 2024 Award
- The nominee of the Poet of the Year 2023 Award

== Books ==
- Паронян Л. Человек мира. [стихи] / Паронян Лилия. — Изд-во «BookBox», 2024. – 198 с. — ISBN 978-5-907802-14-8
- Паронян Л. Следуй за душой! [стихи] / Паронян Лилия. — Москва : АРТ-Сияние, 2020. — 187 с. — ISBN 978-5-6045467-0-3
- Паронян Л. Будь собой! [стихи] / Паронян Лилия. — Изд-во «BookBox», 2021. – 120 с. — ISBN 978-5-907416-60-4
