= Davit Lokyan =

Armenian politician

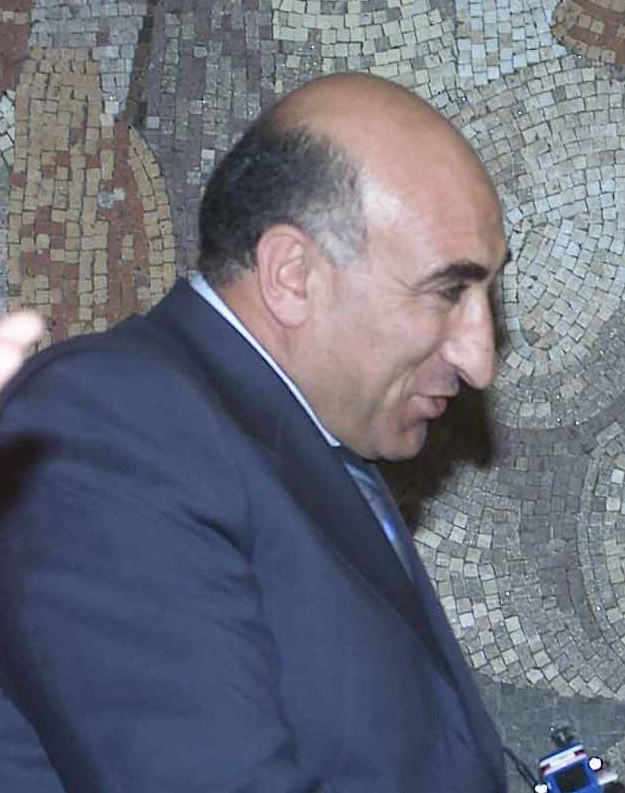
- Davit Lokyan in 2005

Minister of Urban Development of Armenia
- In office January 2001 – June 2003
- Preceded by: Hovik Abrahamyan
- Succeeded by: Ara Aramyan

Minister of Agriculture of Armenia
- In office June 2003 – June 2008
- Preceded by: David Zadoyan
- Succeeded by: Aramais Grigoryan

Minister of Territorial Administration and Development of Armenia
- In office February 24, 2016 – April 9, 2018
- President: Serzh Sargsyan

Minister of Territorial Administration and Development of Armenia
- In office 23 April 2018 – 26 April 2018
- President: Serzh Sargsyan

Personal details
- Born: 20 January 1958 (age 68) Ninotsminda, Soviet Georgia
- Party: Armenian Revolutionary Federation

Davit Lokyan (Armenian: Դավիթ Լոքյան; born: January 20, 1958) is an Armenian politician. He served as the Minister of Territorial Administration and Development of Armenia from 2016 to 2018.

== Biography ==
He was born on January 20, 1958, in Ninotsminda, Soviet Georgia.

Positions held

- 1998-1999 - Deputy Governor of Lori Region.
- May 30, 1999 - Elected Member of Parliament. Member of the Standing Committee on Fiscal, Credit and Economic Affairs. Head of the ARF faction.
- 2001-2003 - was the Minister of Urban Development of Armenia.
- 2003-2008 - Minister of Agriculture of Armenia.
- On February 24, 2016, by the decree of the President of Armenia, he was appointed Minister of Territorial Administration and Development of Armenia.
- On April 19, 2018, Lokyan became the Minister of Territorial Administration and Development of Armenia in the government of Serzh Sargsyan. On April 23, as a result of protests, Sargsyan left office and Karen Karapetyan became prime minister, while Lokyan remained in his post as acting. Three days later David Lokyan submitted his resignation.

== Awards ==
- Anania Shirakatsi Medal
- Vachagan Barepasht Medal
- Armenian Prime Minister's Commemorative Medal

== See also ==
- Karapetyan government
- Abrahamyan government
- Second Serzh Sargsyan government
