= Kumurdo Cathedral =

Georgian Orthodox cathedral near Akhalkalaki, Georgia

Kumurdo Cathedral კუმურდოს ტაძარი
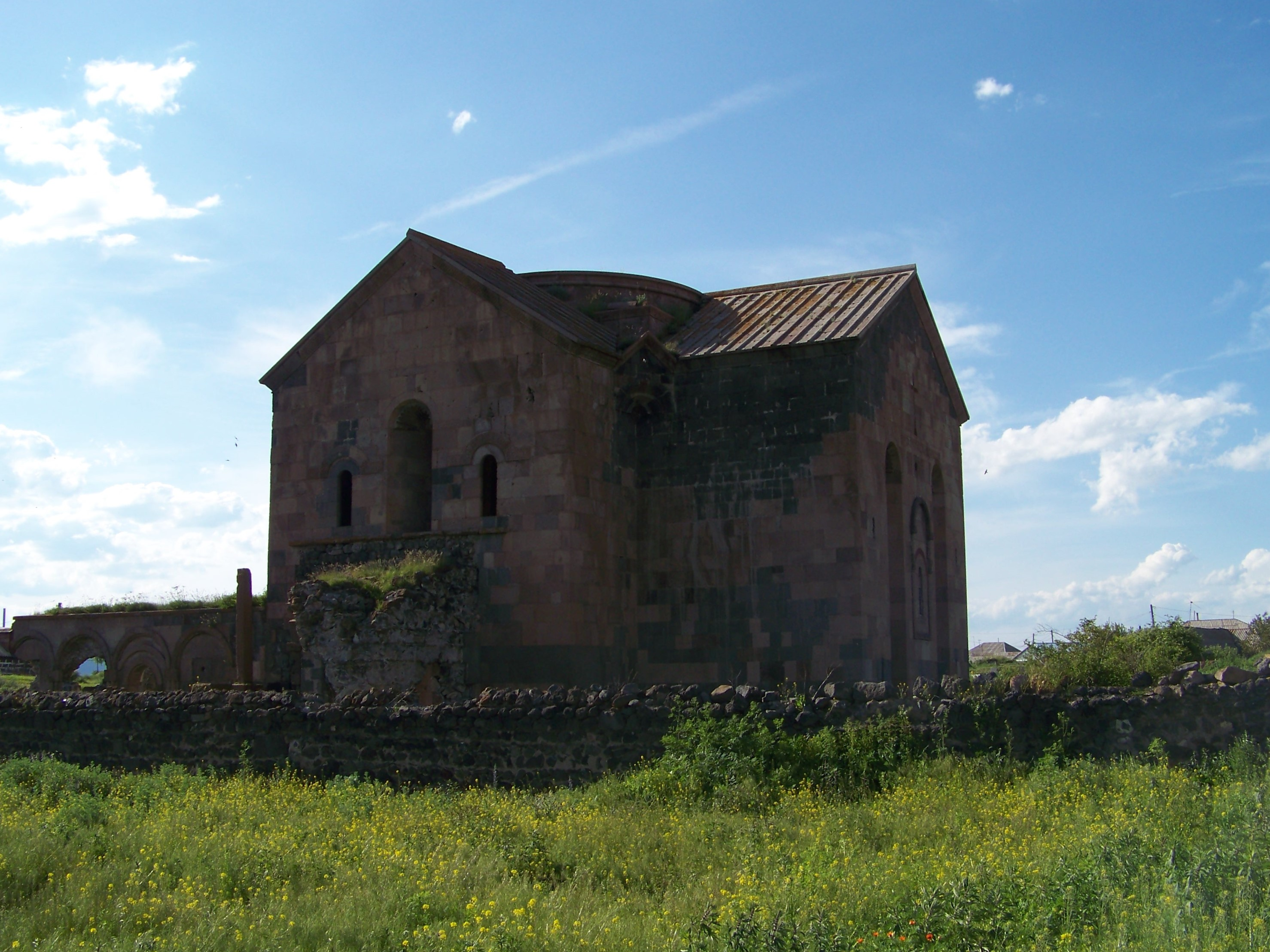
- Kumurdo Cathedral

- Location within Samtskhe-Javakheti Location within Georgia

Religion
- Affiliation: Georgian Orthodox
- Ecclesiastical or organizational status: Cathedral

Location
- Location: Kumurdo, Akhalkalaki District, Georgia
- Interactive map of Kumurdo Cathedral კუმურდოს ტაძარი
- Coordinates: 41.3946207°N 43.3596331°E

Architecture
- Completed: 10th century during the reign of King Leon III of Abkhazia

Kumurdo Cathedral (Georgian: კუმურდო) is a Georgian Orthodox Cathedral. It is situated on Javakheti Plateau, 12 km (7.5 mi) southwest from Akhalkalaki. According to the inscriptions on the walls, written with the ancient Georgian writing of Asomtavruli, the Kumurdo Cathedral was built by Ioane the Bishop during the reign of king of the Abkhazians Leon III in 964. It is the first church with emerging features of the 11-13th century architecture of Georgia. During the Middle Ages, Kumurdo was an important cultural, educational and religious center. The cathedral was restored twice (1930; 1970–1980), but it stands without a dome. In 2015, a project for full reconstruction of the cathedral was developed.

== Architecture ==
The domed building was constructed in stone and was decorated with fine engravings. The dome itself and the roof of the western arm are missing. In the exterior plan it has four square arms. Inside only the western arm is square. The eastern, southern and northern arms contain apses: one, two and two, respectively. Such type of multiapse design is unique among the Georgian multiapse churches. Arrow arches, powerful piers, rising up the dome, smooth bricks and fine design of the conches was aimed to give the feeling that the church stretches up.

The cathedral is richly decorated. It is possible to follow the development of ornamentation technique from the 10th to the 11th centuries. The later ornaments were placed on the walls of the western arm. The ornamentation covers windows, doors, cornice, tromps of the corners and other parts. It is composed of both geometric and floristic motifs.

The most decorated eastern facade is divided into three parts by two deep niches. The central part contains a complex decorative composition of crosses, inscription and windows. The central window has an arch, ornamental frame and reliefs. Above it there is a rounded ornamented window, then inscription and high cross, made of red stone. Below the main window there is a small cross.

The lateral facades both contain a single nich, with reliefs above it, depicting Adam and Eve, on southern and northern facades, respectively.

The windows around the altar are decorated with replicas of bulls, eagles, lions and angels. The interior of the cathedral is decorated with mural paintings. Original paintings remain only in the apse. Of special interest is a relief portrait of Queen Gurandukht, the mother of King Bagrat III, with the cross on her breast, carved on one of the eastern squinches. She stretches her hands to the man, dressed in king's clothes, carved on another squinch.

A small chapel stands adjacent to the cathedral from the south. It was probably built at the same period, but a finely ornamented stele on its western wall dates back to the 5th or 6th centuries.

== Epigraphy of the church ==
The inscriptions on the southern and eastern facades tell that the church was built by architect Sakotsari with the order of Bishop Ioanne in 964.

- With God's help, the bishop Iovane laid the foundation of this church by my hand — of the sinful Sakotsari.
- Holy church, protect and pardon your servants and all your builders on that Day of Judgement; mention the wretched Giorgi in your prayer.
- Inscription of the Bishop Iovane (964).

Christ, have mercy on the Bishop Iovane, builder of this, on that day.

- Feast day inscription of the Eristavi Vache (964).

In the name of God, I, the Bishop Iovane, fixed the feast day of the Eristavi Vache, on Easter day. Whoever alters this, be he cursed by his icon, my cross.

- Feast day inscription of Goliat (10th-11th centuries).

In the name of God, I, Bishop Grigol, fixed the feast day of Goliat, on the Day of Ignatus. Whoever alters this be he cursed by this icon, my cross.

Later alterations by Bishop Zosime are documented on the southern facade. He added a portal to the western arm, and ordered golden decorations from master David.

- Inscription of Zosime Kumurdoeli (1027-1072).

In the name of God, I, Zosime Kumurdoeli, invested the altar, chalice, dish, the cross, and embellished the icon of the Saviour by the hand of David. Fixed his feast day with kyrie eleison on the fifth (day) of Palm Week:let the archpriest celebrate the feast on the (day) of the Holy Trinity by singing a hymn. He who alters this be cursed by this icon.

- Inscriptions on the tympanum of the western entrance to the chapel (1511-1525).

Jesus Christ, glorify in both lives the second builder, patron Elisbal, their mother Kristine, their spouse Marikh, their sons and daughters, amen.

The cross of Christ.

God have mercy on Zosime Kumurdoeli, amen.

God have mercy on the stonemason Mikela.

== Gallery ==
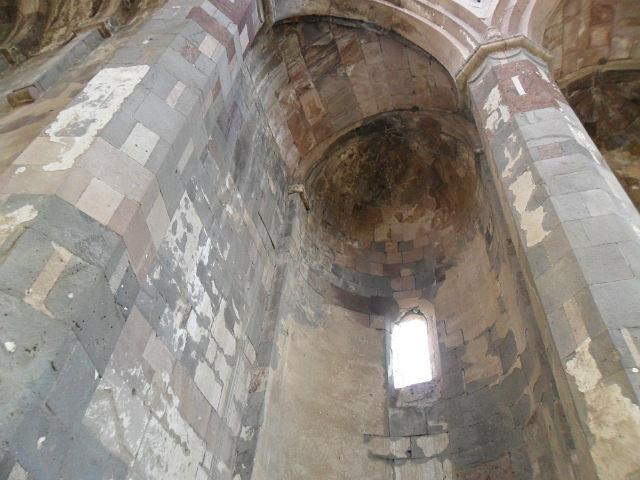

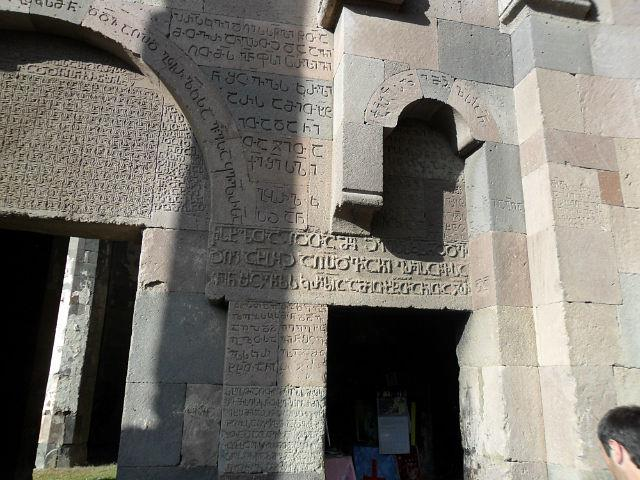

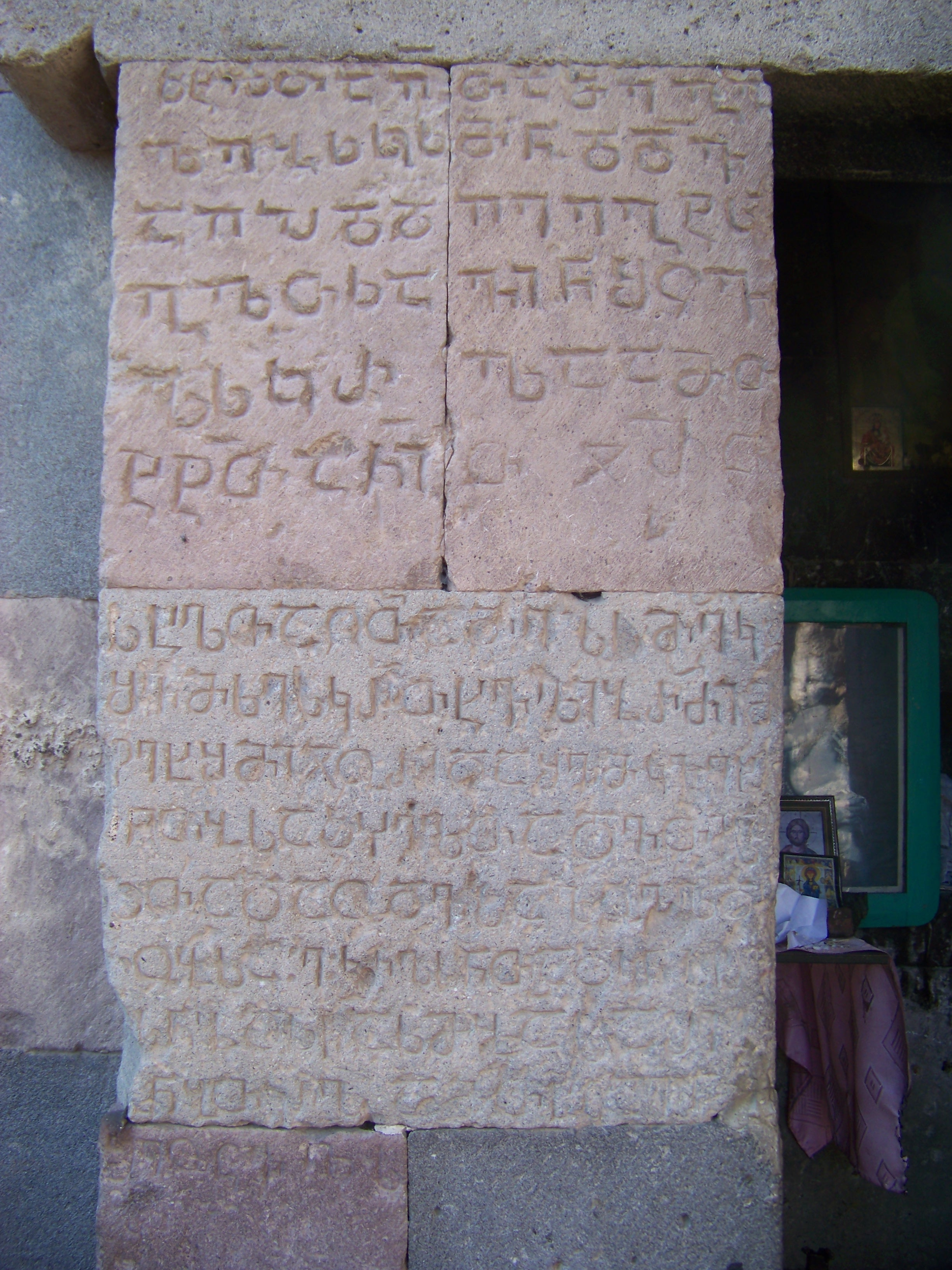

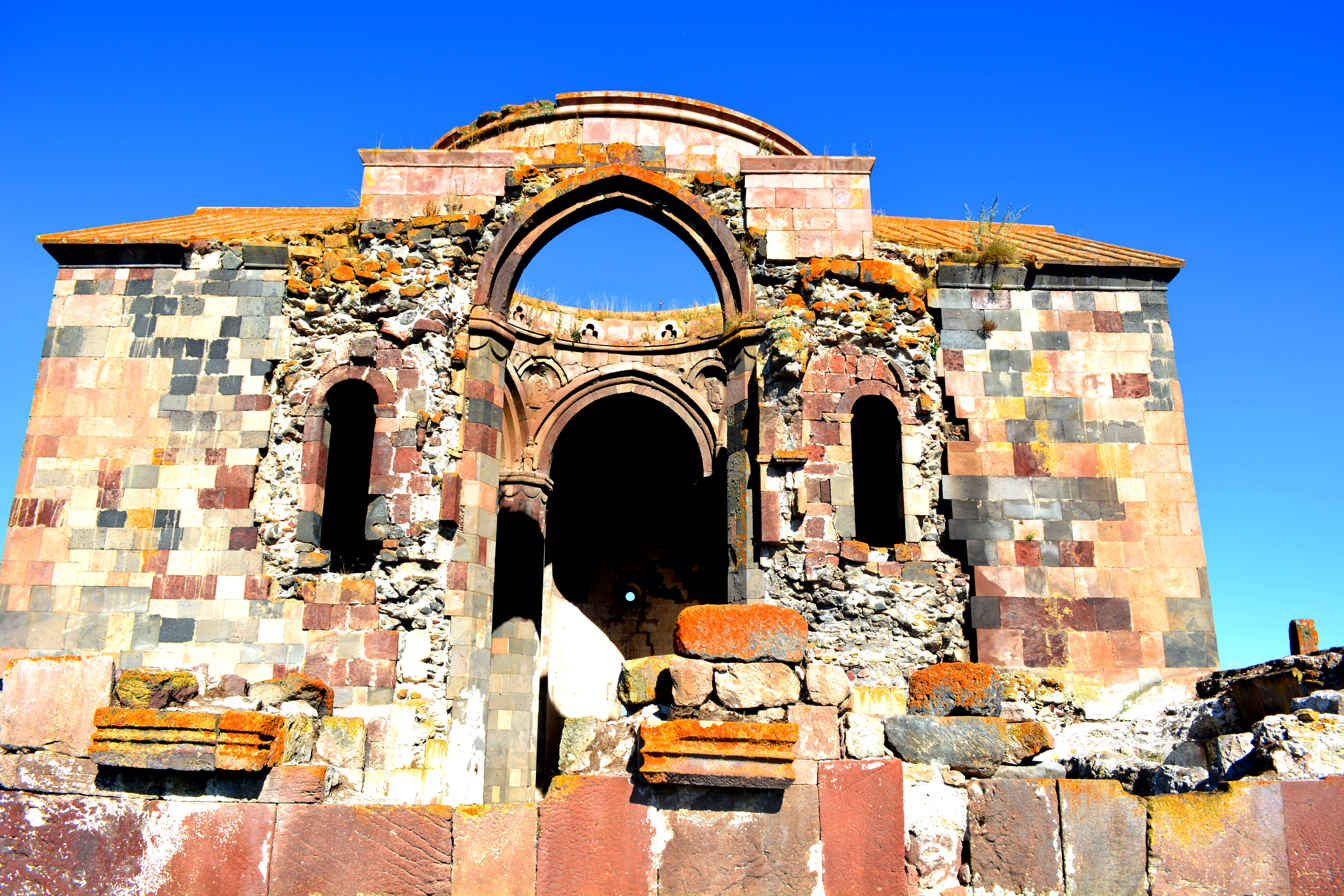

== Sources ==
- (in Georgian) ვალერი სილოგავა, კუმურდოს ტაძრის ეპიგრაფიკა. თბილისი, 1994.
