= Baraleti church =

Church in Baraleti, Georgia

- ბარალეთის ეკლესია
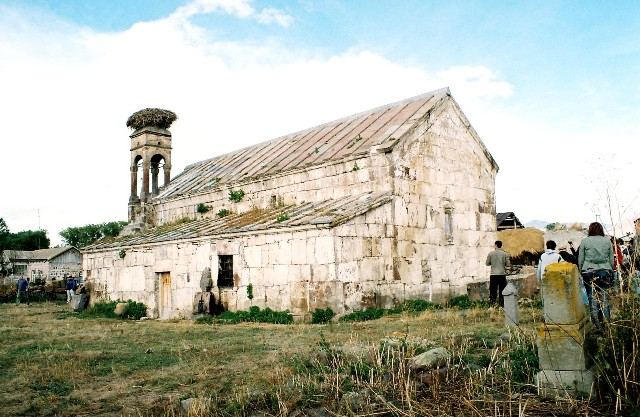
- Baraleti church
- Interactive map of Baraleti church
- Location: Baraleti, Akhalkalaki Municipality, Samtskhe-Javakheti, Georgia
- Coordinates: 41.5420190°N 43.5086093°E
- Type: Two-nave basilica church

The Baraleti church of the Theotokos (Georgian: ბარალეთის ღვთისმშობლის სახელობის ეკლესია, romanized: baraletis ghvtismshoblis sakhelobis ek'lesia) is a medieval Christian church in the village of Baraleti, Akhalkalaki Municipality, in Georgia's region of Samtskhe-Javakheti. The church is located in the heart of the ethnically mixed Armeno-Georgian village, in the historical province of Javakheti. It is a two-nave basilica, with the extant 13th-century inscription in Georgian. It is inscribed on the list of the Immovable Cultural Monuments of National Significance of Georgia.

== Architecture ==
The Baraleti church was built c. 1213 as suggested by a stone inscription on the eastern façade—executed in the medieval Georgian asomtavruli script—which dates the construction to "the time when Lasha sat [on the throne] as king", referring to George IV Lasha, king of Georgia. However, the text may actually refer to reconstruction as a plan of the church is representative of an earlier period, particularly, the 11th century.

The church is a two-nave basilica built of hewn stone blocks. The roof is covered with stone tiles. The entrance is from the south. Each façade is pierced by a single window. The walls contain shelf-like eaves. The central, northern nave terminates in a semi-circular apse, surrounded with pilasters and arches. The southern nave is lower and narrower, with a smaller semi-circular apse. An arboured belfry was superimposed on the western edge of the church in the 19th century. The exterior is decoration-poor, with only a now-damaged relief immured in the southern wall of the central nave, depicting Daniel in the lions' den, and the 13th-century text inscribed in the eastern façade.

== Churchyard ==
There are several tombstones scattered around the church. An epitaph on one of these honors the local Georgian priest Petre Khmaladze (1775–1856) and mentions his contribution to the defense of Christianity in the area, which had been under the Ottoman rule before passing into the control of the Russian Empire in 1829. Khmaladze was canonized by the Georgian Orthodox Church in 2015.
