= Noravan, Syunik =

Noravan Նորավան
- Location within Armenia Location within Syunik Province
- Coordinates: 39°31′10″N 46°06′02″E
- Country: Armenia
- Province: Syunik
- Municipality: Sisian

Area
  - Total: 34.17 km^{2} (13.19 sq mi)

Population (2011)
  - Total: 485
  - Density: 14.2/km^{2} (36.8/sq mi)
- Time zone: UTC+4 (AMT)

Noravan (Armenian: Նորավան) is a village in the Sisian Municipality of the Syunik Province in Armenia.

== Demographics ==
The Statistical Committee of Armenia reported its population was 524 in 2010, up from 517 at the 2001 census.
