= Eshtia =

Village in Samtskhe–Javakheti, Georgia

Eshtia ეშტია
- Village
- Location within Georgia
- Coordinates: 41°20′33″N 43°36′43″E
- Country: Georgia
- Mkhare: Samtskhe–Javakheti
- Municipality: Ninotsminda Municipality

Population (2014)
  - Total: 1,691
- Time zone: UTC+4 (Georgian Time)

Eshtia (Georgian: ეშტია) is a village in the Samtskhe-Javakheti region of Georgia, within the boundaries of the Ninotsminda Municipality. The village is located at the foot of Mount Abuli. It is mainly populated by Catholic Armenians who migrated from Turkey following the Russo-Turkish War of 1828–1829.

Eshtia is one of the old villages in the historic region of Javakheti. After the Ottomans conquered this region in 1578, it was part of the Akşehir district (nahiye) of the Ahalkalaki province (liva) within the Ottoman administrative system. Its population consisted of 12 Christian households. The heads of these households were men with Georgian names such as Gogicha, Merab, Tevdore, and Zaraspa.

The village of Eshtia and the Javakheti region were ceded by the Ottoman Empire to the Russian Empire following the Russo-Turkish War of 1828–1829. In the 1886 Russian census, the village was recorded as Eshtia (Эштіа) in Russian. At that time, the Armenian population living in the village numbered 1,519.

The Victor Ovsepian House Museum located in Eshtia has belongings of the artist, who was also a poet.

== See also ==
- Samtskhe-Javakheti
