= Kartsakhi Lake =

Lake between Georgia and Turkey

- კარწახის ტბა (Georgian); Aktaş Gölü (Turkish)
- View of the lake from the Georgian side

- Location within Samtskhe-Javakheti Location within Georgia Location within Turkey
- Interactive map of Kartsakhi Lake
- Coordinates: 41°12′54″N 43°13′16″E
- Catchment area: 158 km^{2} (61 sq mi)
- Basin countries: Georgia, Turkey
- Surface area: 26.3 km^{2} (10.2 sq mi)
- Max. depth: 1 m (3 ft 3 in)
- Water volume: 19.3 km^{3} (4.6 cu mi)
- Salinity: 880 ‰
- Surface elevation: 1,800 m (5,900 ft)

Kartsakhi Lake (Georgian: კარწახის ტბა, karts'akhis tba), or Lake Khozapini (Georgian: ხოზაფინის ტბა, khozap'inis tba; Turkish: Hazapin Gölü), or Lake Aktaş (Turkish: Aktaş Gölü), is a soda lake in the Caucasus Mountains. It straddles the international border between Georgia (53%) and Turkey (47%). The village of Kartsakhi lies near the lake's northeastern shore.

It is the second largest lake in Georgia, covering an area of 26.3 or 26.6 square kilometers at an altitude of 1799 m. It is fed by a number of creeks. During the rainy season, its excess water discharges into the Kura River. The water level has fallen due to reduced precipitation.

== Fauna ==
It is an important bird habitat; it holds one of the largest populations of the Eurasian eagle-owl in the country, along with populations of the Dalmatian pelican and great white pelican.
