= European route E691 =

Road in trans-European E-road network

E691

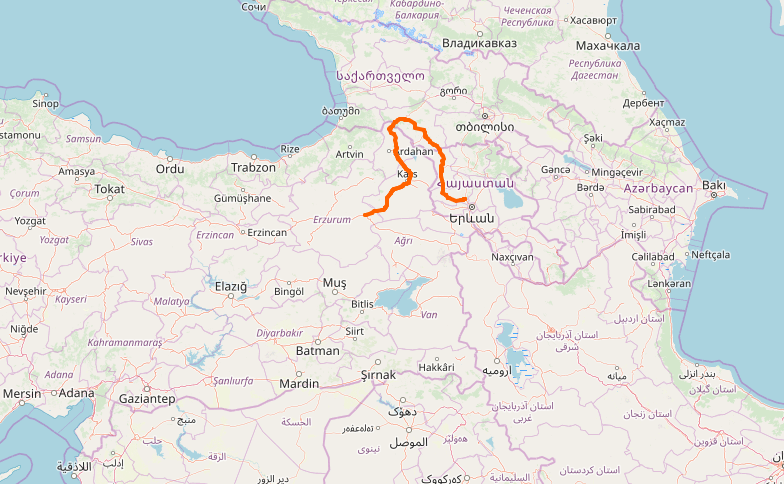

Route information
- Length: 460 km (290 mi)

Major junctions
- From: Ashtarak
- Gyumri, Kars
- To: Horasan

Location
- Countries: Armenia, Georgia, Turkey

Highway system
- International E-road network; A Class; B Class

European route E 691 is a European B class road running from Armenia through Georgia to Turkey.

== Route ==
- Armenia
  - Մ1: Ashtarak ( E117) - Gyumri - Ashotsk
- Georgia
  - ს 11: Ninotsminda - Akhalkalaki - Akhaltsikhe
  - ს 8: Akhaltsikhe - Vale
- Turkey
  - D.955: Türkgözü - Çamlıçatak
  - D.965: Çamlıçatak - Kars
  - D.957: Kars - Karakurt
  - D.080: Karakurt - Horasan ( E80)
