= Akhaltsikhe Municipality =

Coordinates: 41.6389°N 42.9861°E

Akhaltsikhe Municipality ახალციხის მუნიციპალიტეტი
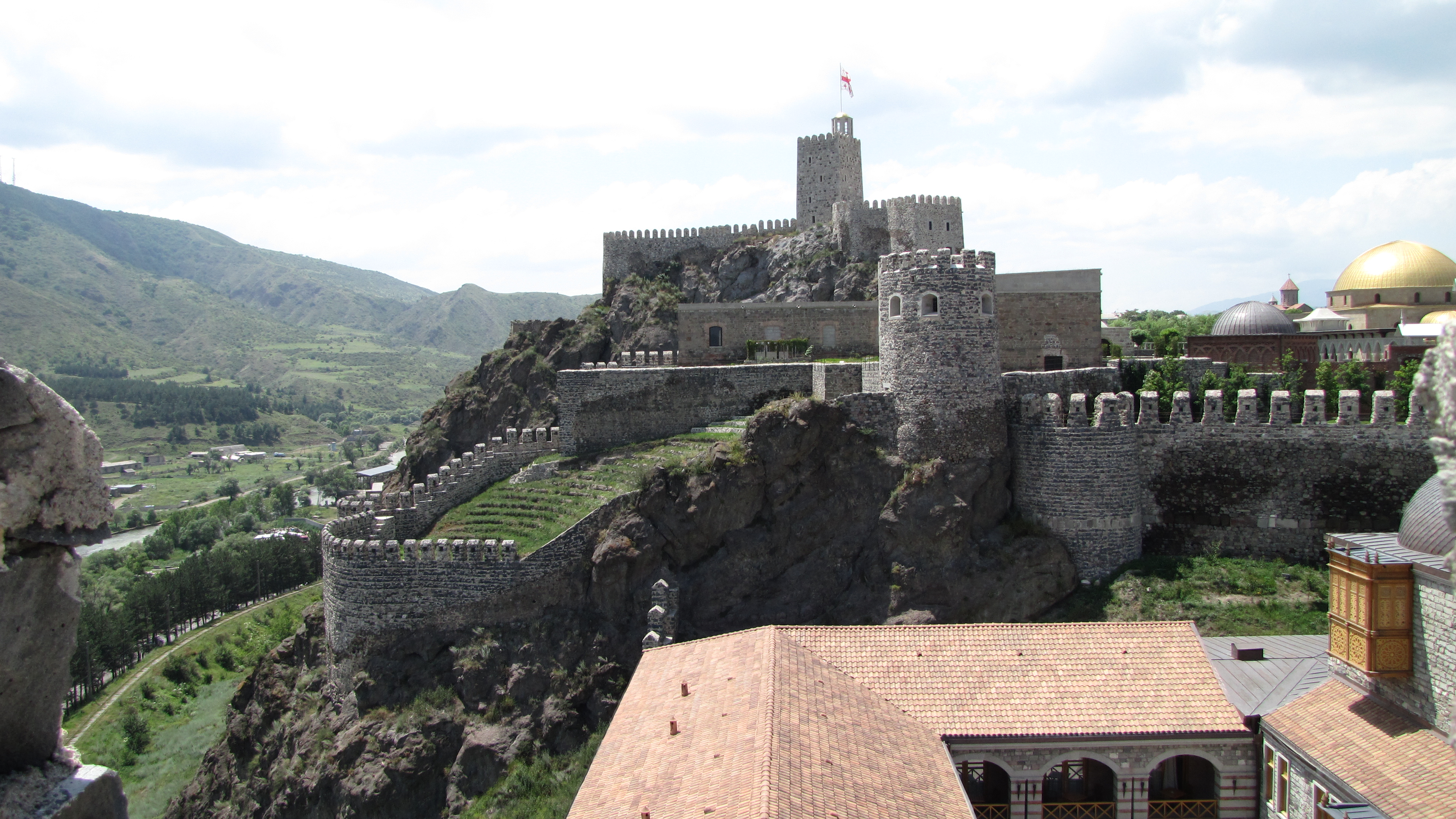
- Rabati Castle

- Flag Seal

- Country: Georgia
- Mkhare: Samtskhe-Javakheti
- Capital: Akhaltsikhe

Government
  - Type: Mayor–Council
  - Mayor: Irakli Lazarashvili (GD)

Area
  - Total: 1,010.4 km^{2} (390.1 sq mi)

Population (2021)
  - Total: 39,463
  - Density: 39.057/km^{2} (101.16/sq mi)

Population by ethnicity
  - Georgians: 68,00 %
  - Armenians: 30,92 %
  - Russians: 0,37 %
  - Greeks: 0,18 %
  - Azerbaijanis: 0,15 %
- Time zone: UTC+4 (Georgian Time)
- Website: https://www.akhaltsikhe.gov.ge/

Akhaltsikhe (Georgian: ახალციხის მუნიციპალიტეტი, Akhaltsikhis munitsip’alit’et’i) is a municipality in Georgia's southern region of Samtskhe-Javakheti. Covering an area of 1,010.4 km^{2} (390 sq mi). As of 2021 it had a population of 39,463 people. The city of Akhaltsikhe is its administrative centre.

== Administrative divisions ==
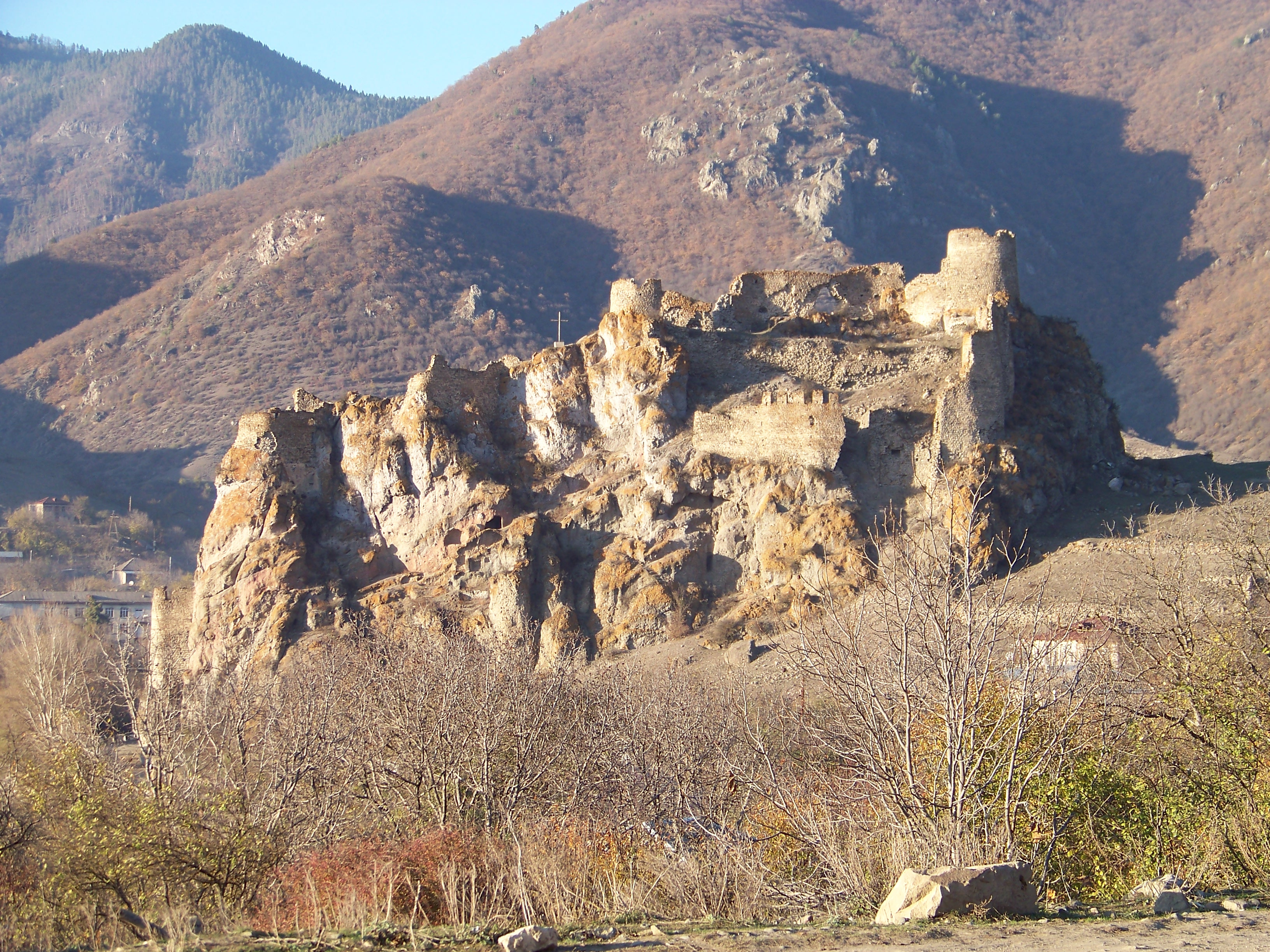
Atsquri Fortress

Akhaltsikhe municipality is administratively divided into two cities (Akhaltsikhe and Vale) and 14 communities (თემი, temi) with 46 villages (სოფელი, sopeli).

The city of Akhaltsikhe was separated in 2014 from the municipality and was a so-called "self-governed" city (or kalaki). This administrative and governance reform was deemed too inefficient and expensive and was revoked in 2017. Since then, the city of Akhaltsikhe has been part of the general municipality again.

== Politics ==
Akhaltsikhe Municipal Assembly (Georgian: ახალციხის საკრებულო, Akhaltsikhe Sakrebulo) is a representative body in Akhaltsikhe Municipality, consisting of 39 members which are elected every four years. The last election was held in October 2021. Irakli Lazarashvili of Georgian Dream was elected mayor.

Party	2017	2021	Current Municipal Assembly
Georgian Dream	28	25	
United National Movement	2	8	
People's Power		3 (Note: Split from Georgian Dream.)	
For Georgia		2	
European Georgia	3	1	
Total	33	39	

== Population ==
By the start of 2021 the population was determined at 39,463 people, a slight increase compared to the 2014 census. (Note: Combined figures of the 2014-2017 city municipality (kalaki) Akhalkalaki and the municipality of Akhalkalaki.) The population of Akhaltsikhe city decreased slightly during the same period. The population density of the municipality is 39.6 inhabitants per square kilometre (103/sq mi).

The population of Akhaltsikhe consists for 68% of Georgians. By far the largest ethnic minority are the Armenians, who make up 31% of the population. Other minorities are a few dozen Russians, Greeks, Ukrainians, Ossetes and a few Abkhazians. In terms of religion, 68% of the population are followers of the Georgian Orthodox Church and 17.4% are followers of the Armenian Apostolic Church. Another large group by Georgian standards are Catholics (12.6%). Furthermore, there are small numbers of followers of Jehovah's Witnesses and Islam.

Population Akhaltsikhe Municipality
	1897	1922	1926	1939	1959	1970	1979	1989	2002	2014	2021
Akhaltsikhe Municipality	-	-	-	55,490	▼50,420	▲51,907	▼49,836	▲54,747	▼46,134	▼38,895	▲39,463
Akhaltsikhe city	15,357	▼10,153	▲12,328	▼12,180	▲16,868	▲18,972	▲19,742	▲24,570	▼18,452	▼17,903	▼17,070
Vale	-	-	-	-	9,629	▼7,326	▼6,244	▲6,305	▼5,031	▼3,646	▲5,215
Data: Population statistics Georgia 1897 to present. Note: (Note: The 2014 census found an inexplicable gap with the data from the national statistical office Geostat. UN-assisted research has found the 2002 census was inflated by about 8-9 percent. See, "1. Introduction", Page 1.)

In November 1944, the Meskhetian Turks, a Turkic-speaking ethnic group of predominantly Muslim faith living in this area, were deported to Soviet Central Asian republics as part of a Stalinist resettlement operation. At that time, the Meskhetians constituted half of the population of the raion Akhaltsikhe (1939: 28,428 of the 55,490 inhabitants). Attempts to return them to independent Georgia have failed, with local resistance.

== See also ==
- List of municipalities in Georgia (country)
