= Ninotsminda =

Ninotsminda ნინოწმინდა
- Town
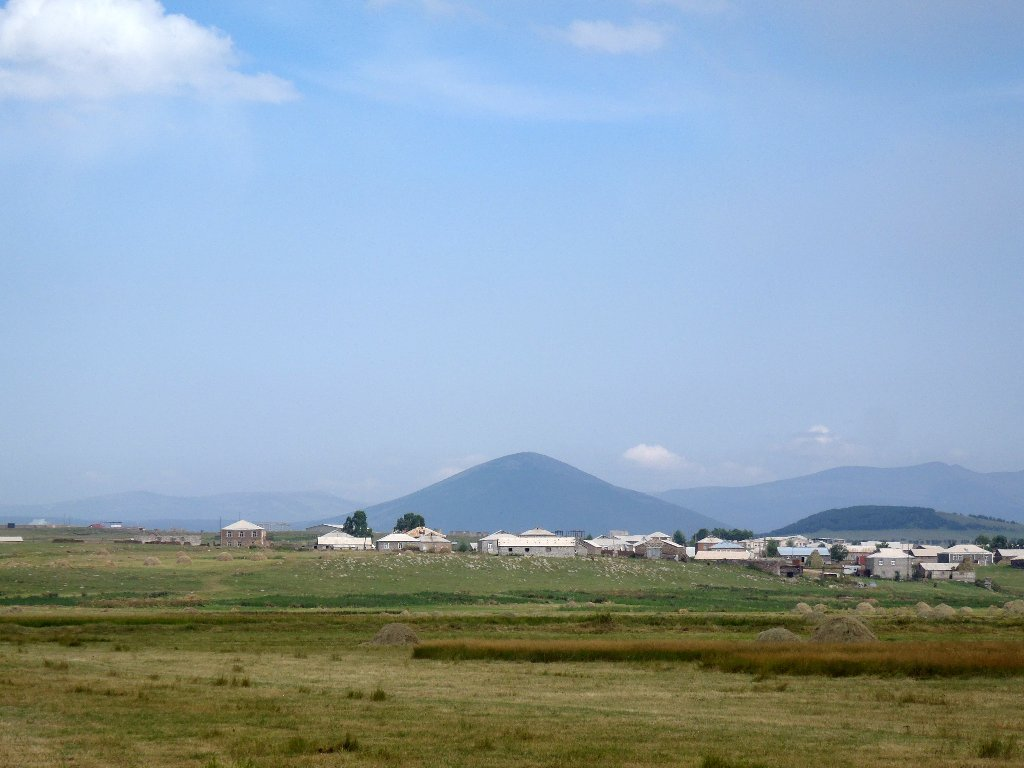
- Ninotsminda environs

- Location within Georgia Location within Samtskhe-Javakheti
- Coordinates: 41°15′52″N 43°35′27″E
- Country: Georgia (country)
- Mkhare: Samtskhe-Javakheti
- District: Ninotsminda

Area
  - Total: 38 km^{2} (15 sq mi)
  - Land: 23 km^{2} (8.9 sq mi)
  - Water: 22 km^{2} (8.5 sq mi)
- Elevation: 1,940 m (6,360 ft)

Population (2024)
  - Total: 3,955
  - Density: 45/km^{2} (120/sq mi)
- Time zone: UTC+4 (Georgian Time)

Ninotsminda (Georgian: ნინოწმინდა [ninotsʼminda]; Armenian: Նինոծմինդա) is a town and a center of the Ninotsminda Municipality located in Georgia's southern district of Samtskhe-Javakheti. According to the 2014 census the town has a population of 5,144. The vast majority of the population are Armenians.

== History ==
Translation of the current official name of the settlement means "Saint Nino" in English and it was given to the town in honor of the illuminator of Georgians St. Nino, in 1991.

During the Ottoman rule, this was a sanjak of Çıldır Eyaleti, called Altunkale, which means "golden castle" in Turkish.

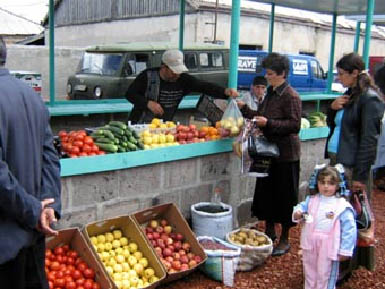
Market in Ninotsminda

Before 1991, the town of Ninotsminda was called Bogdanovka (Russian: Богдановка) - a name going back to the history of the Doukhobor settlement in the region in the 1840s. After the conquest of Kars in 1878, some Doukhobors from Bogdanovka moved to the newly created Kars Oblast. Twenty years later, some of them (or their descendants) emigrated from Kars Oblast to Canada, where they established a short-lived village named Bogdanovka in Langham district of Saskatchewan. Another group of emigrants, coming straight from Georgian Bogdanovka, established another Bogdanovka near Pelly, Saskatchewan.

== Demographics ==
The Georgian census of 2014 counted 24,491 residents in Ninotsminda municipality, of which 23,262 (95%) were Armenians, and 1,029 (4.2%) were Georgians.

In the Soviet Union, the Doukhobor population of the region enjoyed comparatively favorable conditions, isolated from the attention of civil officials as the population of an ethnically mixed borderline region. In the 1990s, following the collapse of the Soviet Union and the rise of nationalist pressure (both local Armenian and state-imposed Georgian), a significant number of the remaining Russian settlers abandoned their homes to settle in Russia.

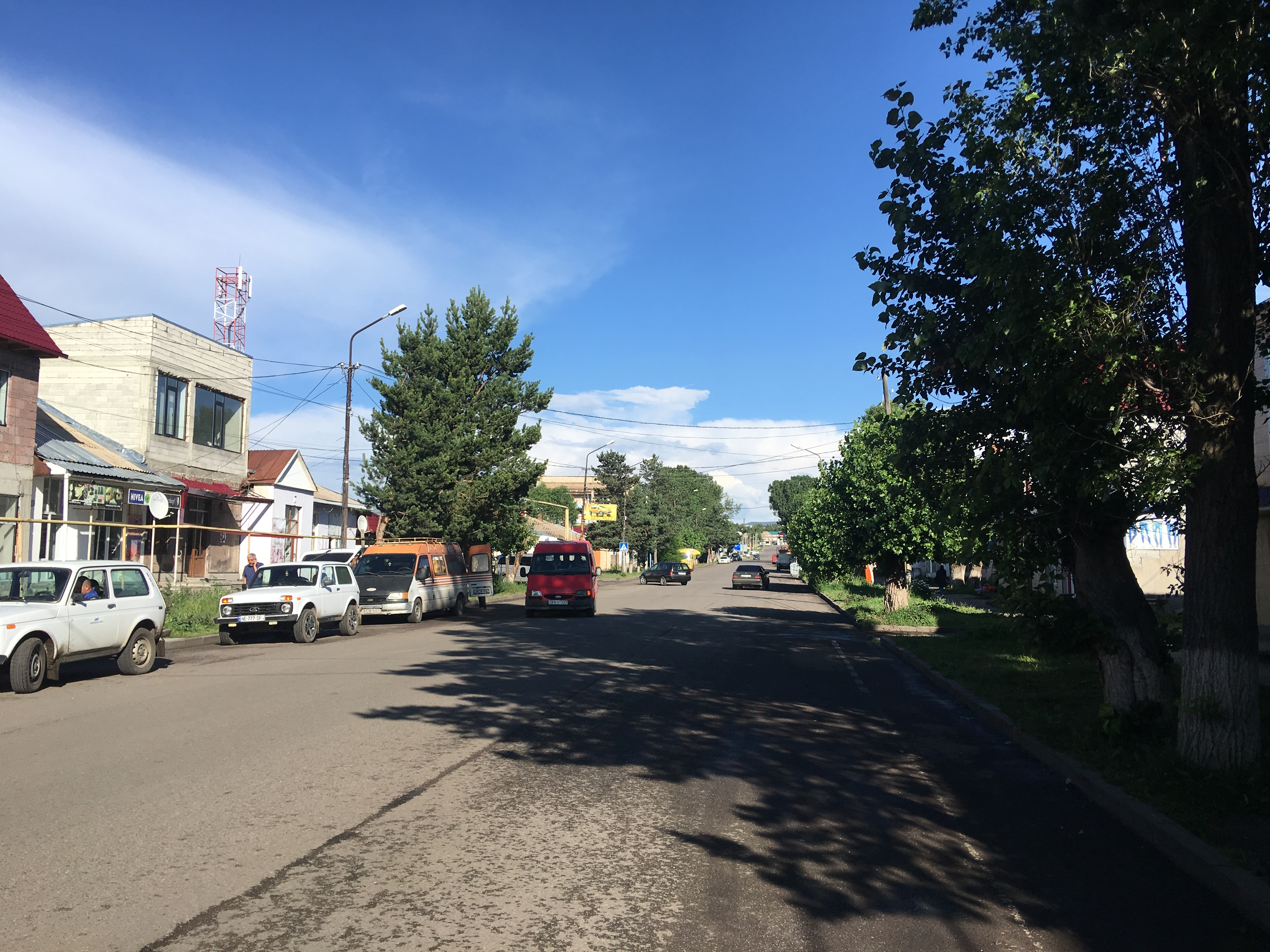
Azatutyun Street, Ninotsminda

== Notable people ==
- Artur Goroyan - Armenian racing driver
- Gurgen Dalibaltayan - Armenian general
- Davit Lokyan - Armenian minister of Territorial and Development
- Nairi Sedrakyan - Armenian mathematician

== See also ==
- Samtskhe-Javakheti
- Heshtia
