= Javakheti Protected Areas =

Area in Akhalkalaki and Ninotsminda

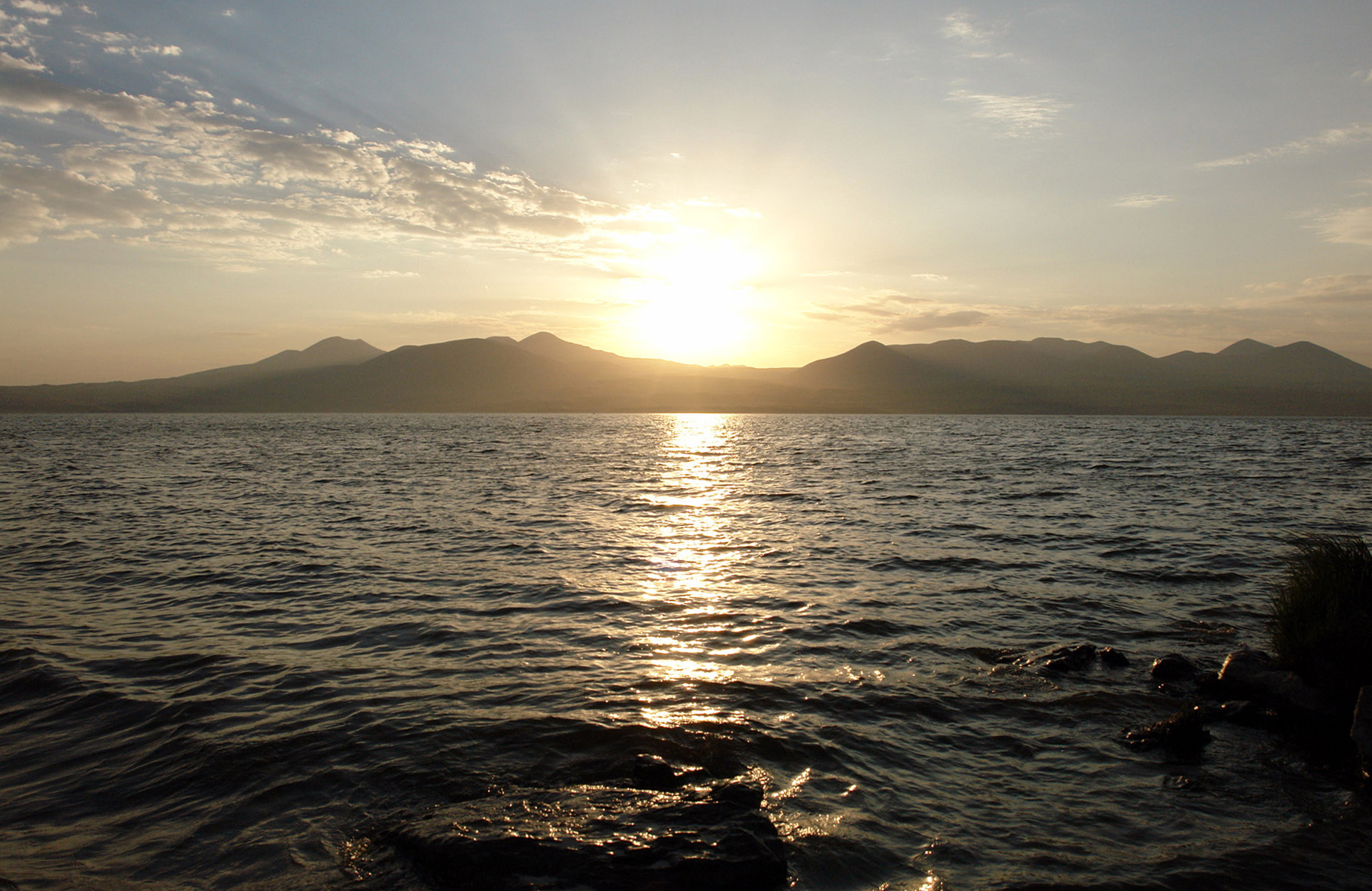
Lake Paravani

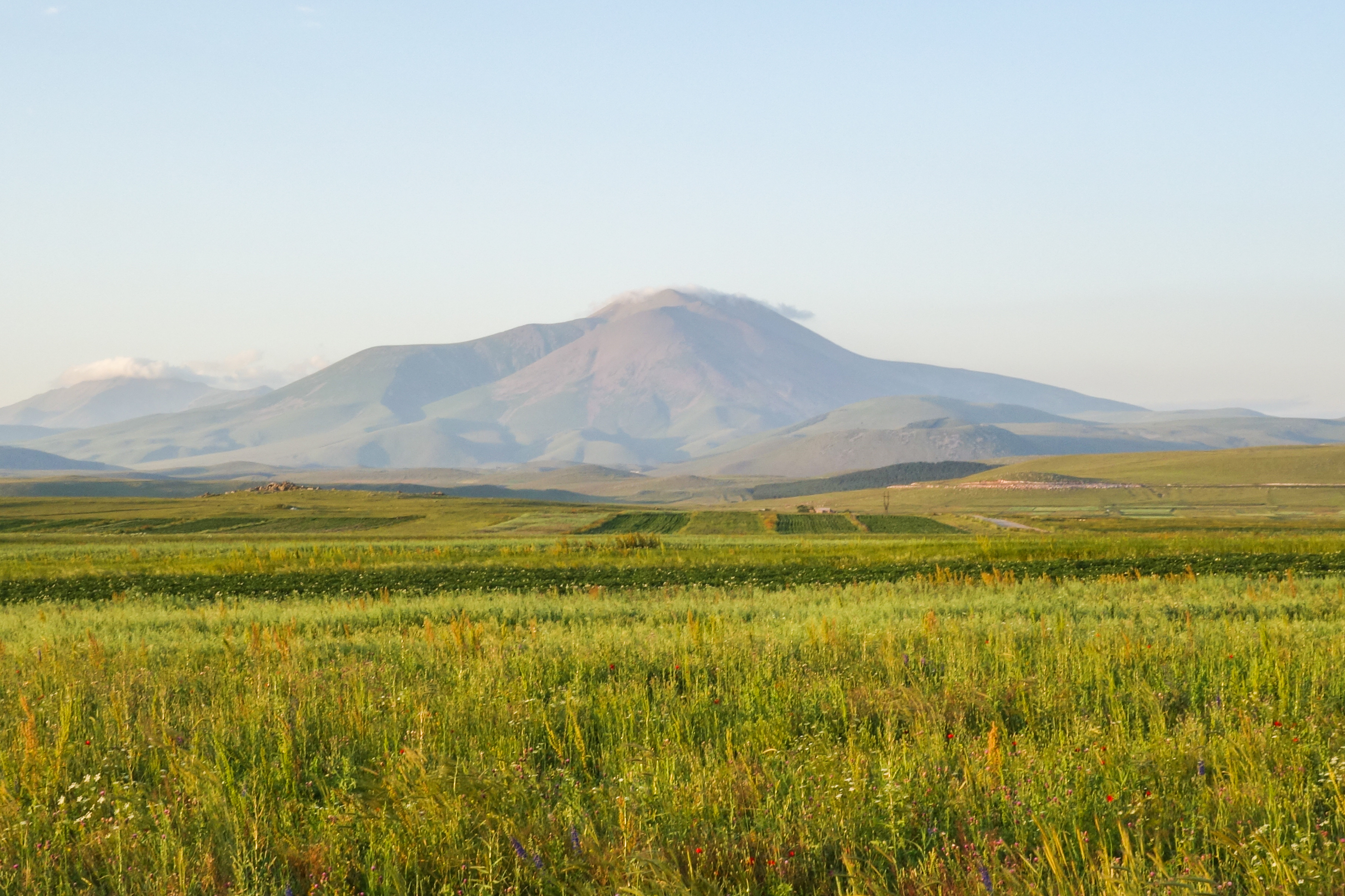
Mount Great Abuli

Javakheti Protected Areas is located in Akhalkalaki and Ninotsminda municipalities in Samtskhe-Javakheti region, Georgia, established in 2011.

== Included areas ==
- Javakheti National Park
- Kartsakhi Managed Reserve
- Sulda Managed Reserve
- Khanchali Managed Reserve
- Bugdasheni Managed Reserve
- Madatapa Managed Reserve
- Lake Paravani
- Mount Great Abuli.
