= List of managed reserves of Georgia =

Protected areas in Georgia make up 7% of the country's land, containing 89 different areas. Of those 89 areas, 19 are listed as managed reserves. While the earliest such reserve was founded in 1912, (Lagodekhi Managed Reserve), the actual category of managed reserve did not exist until 1996. The collective reserves saw visitor numbers of 589,098 in 2021.

Locations of managed reserves

== Managed reserves ==
Name	Region	Municipality	Established	Coordinates	Area	IUCN category
Ajameti Managed Reserve	Imereti	Baghdati Municipality, Zestaponi Municipality	2007	42°6′N 42°45′E	48.48 square kilometres (18.72 mi^{2})	IV
Asa Managed Reserve	Mtskheta-Mtianeti	Dusheti Municipality	2014	42°43′N 44°52′E	39.43 square kilometres (15.22 mi^{2})	IV
Bugdasheni Managed Reserve	Samtskhe-Javakheti	Ninotsminda Municipality	2011	41°12′N 43°41′E	0.5 square kilometres (0.19 mi^{2})	IV
Chachuna Managed Reserve	Kakheti	Dedoplistskaro Municipality	1996	41°17′51″N 45°53′33″E	52 square kilometres (20 mi^{2})	IV
Gardabani Managed Reserve	Kvemo Kartli	Gardabani Municipality	1996	41°27′11″N 45°1′21″E	34.84 square kilometres (13.45 mi^{2})	IV
Ilto Managed Reserve	Kakheti	Akhmeta Municipality	2003	42°16′16″N 45°10′8″E	69.71 square kilometres (26.92 mi^{2})	IV
Iori Managed Reserve	Kakheti	Signagi Municipality	1996	41°22′51.6″N 45°44′1.5″E	13.36 square kilometres (5.16 mi^{2})	IV
Kartsakhi Managed Reserve	Samtskhe-Javakheti	Ninotsminda Municipality	2011	41°14′49″N 43°17′38″E	1.58 square kilometres (0.61 mi^{2})	IV
Katsoburi Managed Reserve	Samegrelo-Zemo Svaneti	Abasha Municipality	1996	42°10′13″N 42°03′47″E	2.94 square kilometres (1.14 mi^{2})	IV
Khanchali Managed Reserve	Samtskhe-Javakheti	Ninotsminda Municipality	2011	41°15′25″N 43°33′00″E	7.27 square kilometres (2.81 mi^{2})	IV
Kobuleti Managed Reserve	Adjara	Kobuleti Municipality	1998	41°51′17″N 41°47′49″E	4.39 square kilometres (1.69 mi^{2})	IV
Korugi Managed Reserve	Kakheti	Sagarejo Municipality	1996	41°38′32″N 45°27′11″E	20.68 square kilometres (7.98 mi^{2})	IV
Ktsia-Tabatskuri Managed Reserve	Samtskhe-Javakheti	Akhalkalaki Municipality	1995	41°41′6.6″N 43°34′13.5″E	220 square kilometres (85 mi^{2})	IV
Lagodekhi Managed Reserve	Kakheti	Lagodekhi Municipality	1912	41°54′N 46°20′E	244.51 square kilometres (94.41 mi^{2})	IV
Madatapa Managed Reserve	Samtskhe-Javakheti	Ninotsminda Municipality	2011	41°10′46″N 43°46′59″E	13.98 square kilometres (5.40 mi^{2})	IV
Nedzvi Managed Reserve	Samtskhe-Javakheti	Borjomi Municipality	1995	41°52′53.3″N 43°30′51″E	89.92 square kilometres (34.72 mi^{2})	IV
Sataplia Managed Reserve	Imereti	Tsqaltubo Municipality	2012	42°18′41.5″N 42°40′30.9″E	0.34 square kilometres (0.13 mi^{2})	IV
Sulda Managed Reserve	Samtskhe-Javakheti	Akhalkalaki Municipality	2011	41°16′50″N 43°20′25″E	3.09 square kilometres (1.19 mi^{2})	IV
Tetrobi Managed Reserve	Samtskhe-Javakheti	Akhalkalaki Municipality	1995	41°36′25″N 43°24′20″E	31 square kilometres (12 mi^{2})	IV

== See also ==
- Environmental issues in Georgia
- List of protected areas of Georgia
