= Bughdasheni Lake =

Lake in Georgia

- Bughdasheni Lake

- Location within Samtskhe-Javakheti Location within Georgia
- Interactive map of Bughdasheni Lake
- Coordinates: 41°12′06″N 43°41′08″E
- Catchment area: 69.3 km^{2} (26.8 sq mi)
- Basin countries: Georgia
- Surface area: 0.39 km^{2} (0.15 sq mi)
- Average depth: 0.42 m (1 ft 5 in)
- Max. depth: 0.85 m (2 ft 9 in)
- Water volume: 0.16 million cubic metres (5.7×10^{6} cu ft)
- Surface elevation: 2,040 m (6,690 ft)

Bughdasheni Lake (Georgian: ბუღდაშენის ტბა) is a volcanic lake in the Ninotsminda Municipality, Samtskhe–Javakheti region of Georgia. located in Javakheti Plateau, at 2040 m above sea level. The area of surface is 0.39 km^{2}, while the catchment area is 69.3 km^{2}. Average depth is 0.42 m, maximal depth is 0.85 m. Gets its feed from snow, rainfall and underground waters. High water levels at spring, low at autumn. Much of the southern part of this area consists of wetlands. The river Bughdasheni (left-bank tributary of the Paravani) flows out of the lake. The lake is rich in fish, including trout. The area around the lake is home for part of the year to many species of migratory birds and the shore largely pristine and undisturbed. Bughdasheni Lake is the part of Bugdasheni Managed Reserve. Since 2020 it has been designated as a Ramsar site.

== See also ==
- Bugdasheni Managed Reserve
- Javakheti Plateau
