= List of lakes of Georgia (country) =

The following is the list of lakes in Georgia, the country in the Caucasus. The Georgian word for "lake" is tba (Georgian: ტბა).

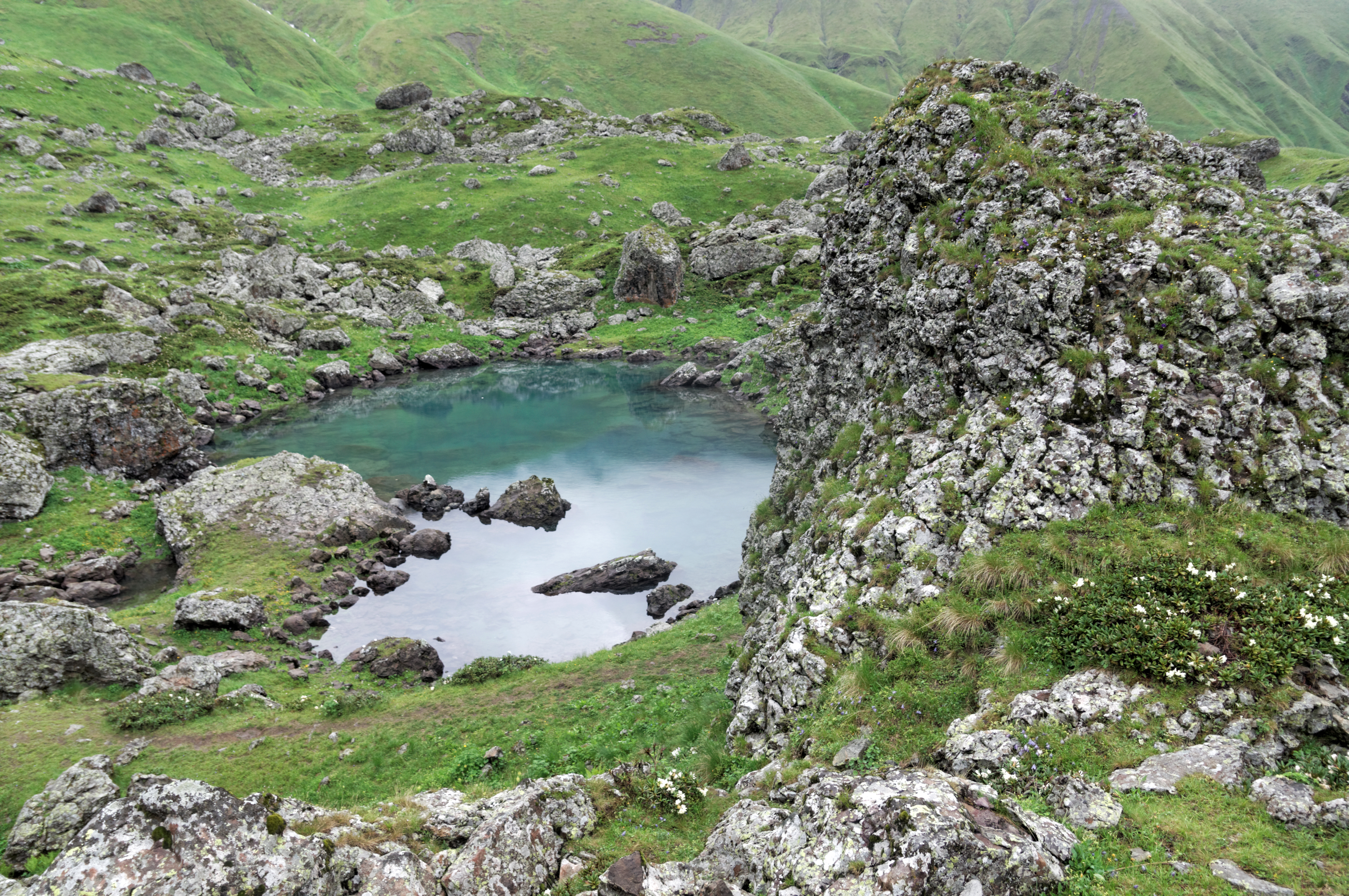
Abudelauri lakes under Chaukhi pass.

== Largest lakes ==
Lake	Surface area km^{2}	Maximum depth m	Height above sea level m	Region
Paravani Lake	37.5	3.3	2,073	Samtskhe-Javakheti
Kartsakhi Lake	26.3	1.0	1,799	Samtskhe-Javakheti
Paliastomi Lake	18.2	3.2	-0.3	Samegrelo-Zemo Svaneti
Tabatskuri Lake	14.2	40.2	1,991	Samtskhe-Javakheti
Khanchali Lake	13.3	0.7	1,928	Samtskhe-Javakheti
Jandari Lake	10.6	7.2	291	Kvemo Kartli
Madatapa Lake	8.8	1.7	2,108	Samtskhe-Javakheti
Saghamo Lake	4.8	2.3	1,996	Samtskhe-Javakheti
Ritsa Lake	1.5	101.0	884	Abkhazia
Keli Lake	1.3	63.0	2,914	Mtskheta-Mtianeti
Bazaleti Lake	1.2	7.0	878	Mtskheta-Mtianeti

== Other ==
- Lisi Lake
- Turtle Lake (Tbilisi)
