= Saghamo Lake =

Coordinates: 41°18′19″N 43°44′29″E

- საღამოს ტბა (Georgian)
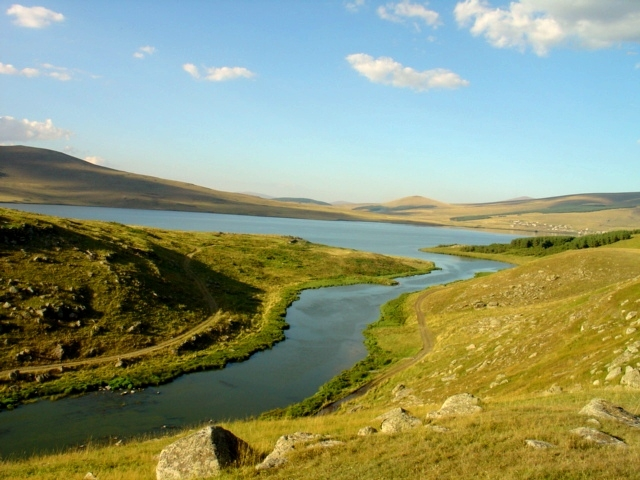

- Location within Samtskhe-Javakheti Location within Georgia
- Interactive map of Saghamo Lake
- Primary inflows: Paravani
- Primary outflows: Paravani
- Catchment area: 528 km^{2} (204 sq mi)
- Basin countries: Georgia
- Surface area: 4.8 km^{2} (1.9 sq mi)
- Average depth: 1.6 m (5 ft 3 in)
- Max. depth: 2.3 m (7 ft 7 in)
- Water volume: 7.7 million cubic metres (270×10^{6} cu ft)
- Surface elevation: 1,996 m (6,549 ft)

Saghamo Lake (Georgian: საღამოს ტბა) is a lake of Samtskhe-Javakheti, southeastern Georgia, just south of Gandzani. It covers an area of 458 hectares. It is located north of Madatapa Lake and Biketi Lake. The village of Saghamo lies on its eastern bank.
