= List of lakes of Georgia =

List of lakes of Georgia may refer to:

- List of lakes of Georgia (country)
- List of lakes of Georgia (U.S. state)
