= Javakheti National Park =

National park of Georgia

- IUCN category II (national park)
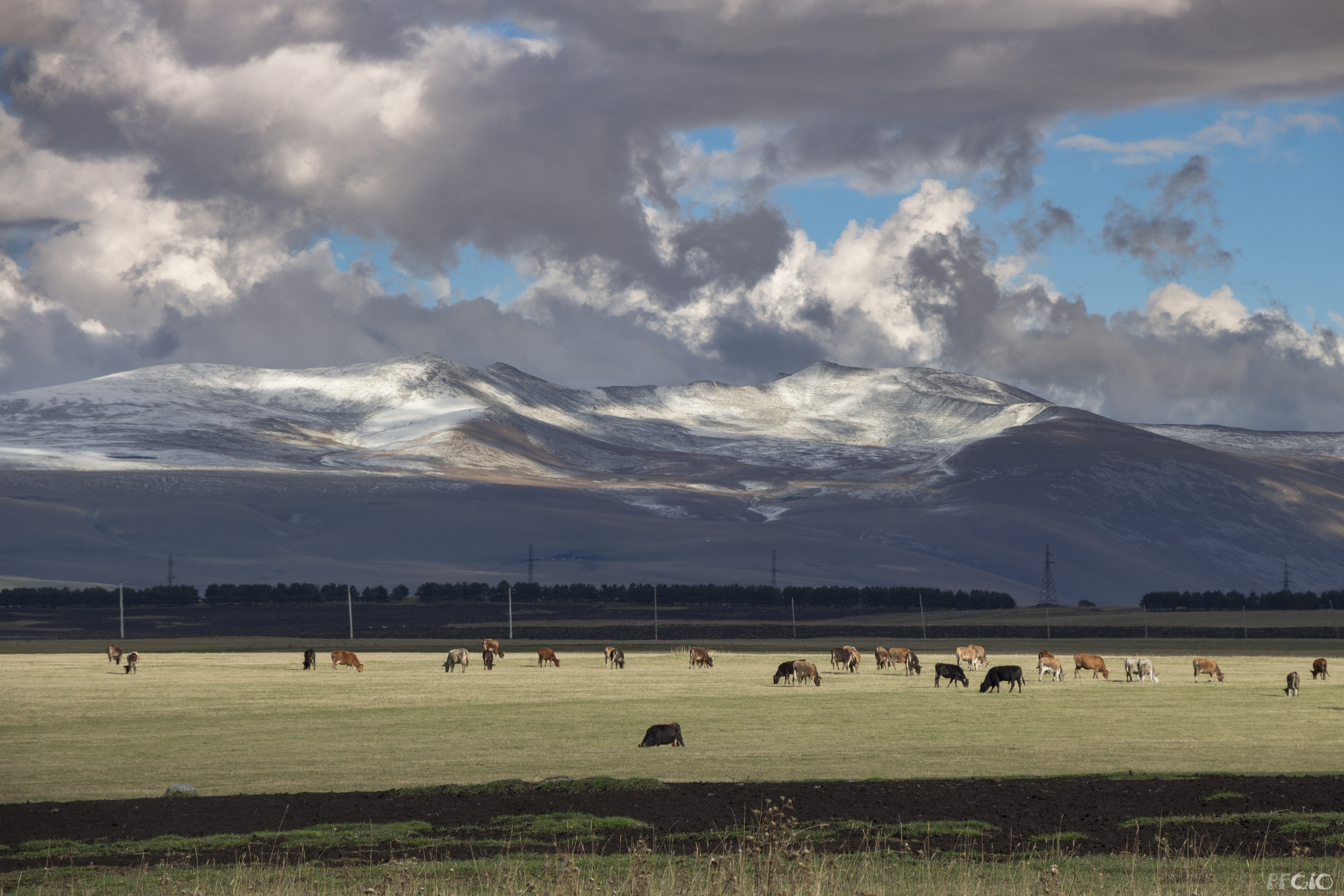
- Landscape

- Location within Georgia Location within Samtskhe-Javakheti
- Location: Georgia
- Nearest city: Akhalkalaki
- Coordinates: 41°10′N 43°26′E
- Area: 238.53 km^{2} (92.10 sq mi)
- Established: 2011
- Governing body: Agency of Protected Areas
- Website: Javakheti Protected Areas Administration

The National Park Javakheti (Georgian: ჯავახეთის ეროვნული პარკი) is located in the Ninotsminda Municipality in south of Georgia on the border with Armenia and Turkey in the Samtskhe–Javakheti region. The park is part of a transboundary protected area: in neighbouring Armenia, it joins the Lake Arpi National Park.

The project to establish the national park was carried out by the Georgian government in cooperation with the WWF and was financially supported by the German government. Local authorities, communities and stakeholders are also involved in the management of the area.

Javakheti National Park is part of Javakheti Protected Areas which also includes Kartsakhi Managed Reserve, Sulda Managed Reserve, Khanchali Managed Reserve, Bugdasheni Managed Reserve and Madatapa Managed Reserve.

== Water resources ==
The national park is aimed at the conservation of the natural situation, but projects are also being carried out in the field of drinking water supply, energy, livestock farming, the sale of local products and tourism. The area contains five of the eight largest lakes in the country and further includes grasslands on mountain slopes. Within the Javakheti Protected Areas are the Khanchali Lake, the Kartsakhi marsh, the Suldis marsh and the Madata Lake.

== Fauna ==
There are many birds in the area, such as the velvet scoter, ruddy shelduck, ferruginous duck, corn crake, different species of pelicans, sandpipers and terns, storks, turnstones and hawk. Special species are the crimson-winged finch (Rhodopechys sanguineus) and the Radde's accentor (Prunella ocularis).

== See also ==
- List of protected areas of Georgia
