= Bugdasheni Managed Reserve =

Protected nature area in Georgia

- Georgian: ბუღდაშენის ტბის აღკვეთილი
- IUCN category IV (habitat/species management area)
- Bugdasheni Lake

- Location within Georgia Location within Samtskhe-Javakheti
- Location: Georgia
- Coordinates: 41°12′1.08″N 43°41′8.52″E
- Established: 2011
- Governing body: Agency of Protected Areas
- Website: Javakheti Protected Areas Administration

Ramsar Wetland
- Official name: Bugdasheni Lake
- Designated: 8 July 2020
- Reference no.: 2434

Bugdasheni Managed Reserve (Georgian: ბუღდაშენის ტბის აღკვეთილი) is a protected area in Ninotsminda Municipality in Samtskhe-Javakheti region of Georgia. It protects Bugdasheni Lake on the south-eastern part of the volcanic Javakheti Plateau, at an altitude of 2042 m above sea level. Bugdasheni Lake ecosystem is undergoing restoration. Since 2020 it has been designated as a Ramsar site.

Bugdasheni Managed Reserve is part of Javakheti Protected Areas which also includes Javakheti National Park, Kartsakhi Managed Reserve, Sulda Managed Reserve, Khanchali Managed Reserve, Madatapa Managed Reserve.

== See also ==
- Javakheti National Park
