= Abuli fortress =

Bronze Age structure

- აბულის ციხე
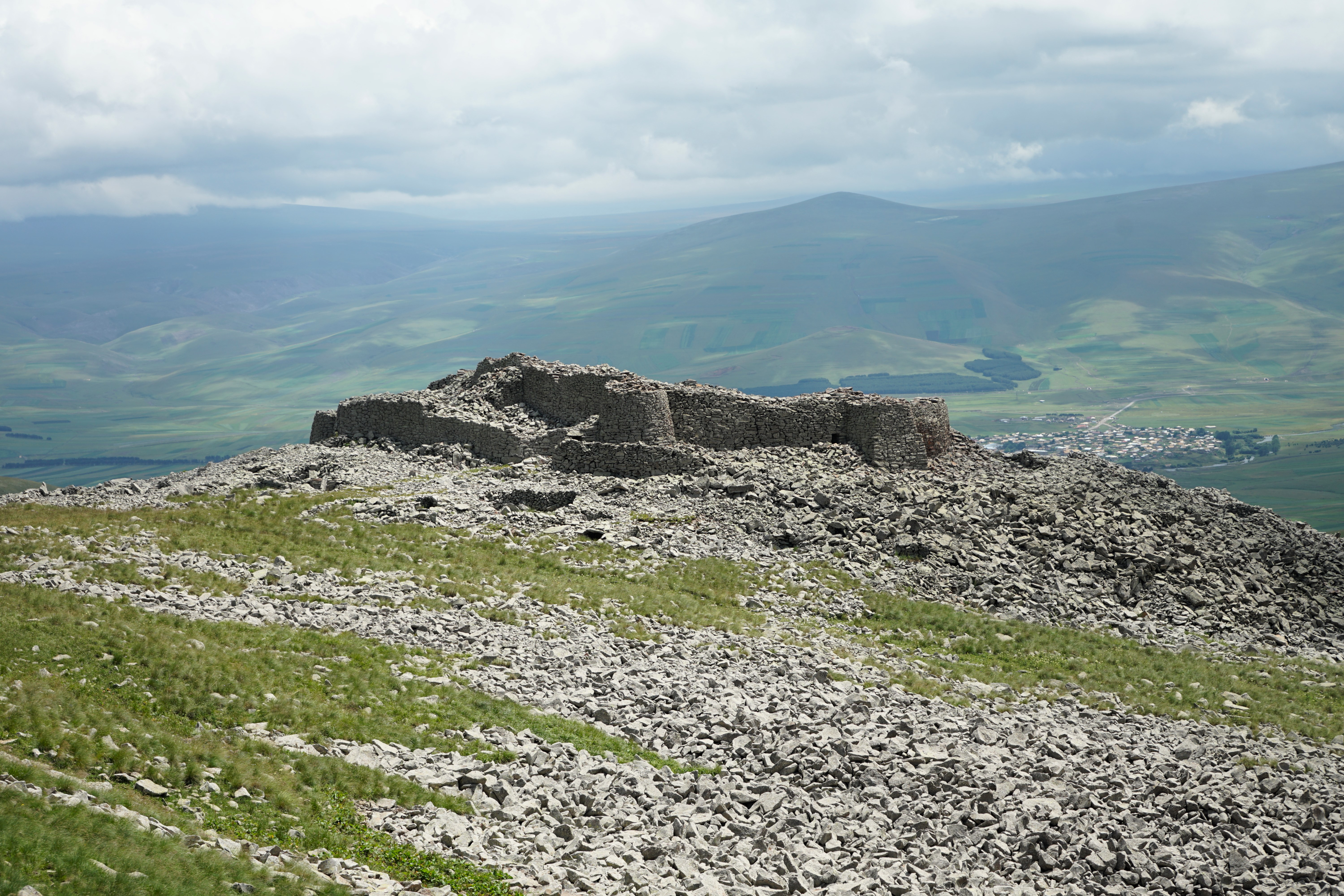
- Abuli fortress
- Interactive map of Abuli fortress
- Location: Akhalkalaki Municipality, Samtskhe-Javakheti, Georgia
- Coordinates: 41.401944°N 43.610556°E
- Type: Cyclopean fortress

The Abuli fortress (Georgian: აბულის ციხე) is a prehistoric megalithic structure in the Akhalkalaki Municipality of Samtskhe–Javakheti, Georgia, located on the southern slope of Mount Patara Abuli in the Lesser Caucasus mountains, at an elevation of 2,670 metres (8,760 ft) above sea level. Constructed using large basalt blocks with dry-stone cyclopean masonry, the fortress consists of a central fortified "citadel" area measuring approximately 60 by 40 metres (200 by 130 ft), surrounded by a complex of multi-level dwellings and hideouts forming a residential zone.

Although the exact date of construction remains uncertain due to the absence of archaeological excavations, Abuli fortress is attributed to the Middle to Late Bronze Age, and is part of a broader cultural phenomenon of cyclopean hillforts across the South Caucasus. These structures are thought to reflect emerging social hierarchies and the consolidation of power among regional elites, serving both defensive and economic roles by controlling arable land and strategic resources.

Abuli fortress is listed among the Immovable Cultural Monuments of National Significance of Georgia and, as of 2019, has been included in a national archaeological initiative to study and conserve Georgia’s megalithic heritage.

== Architecture ==
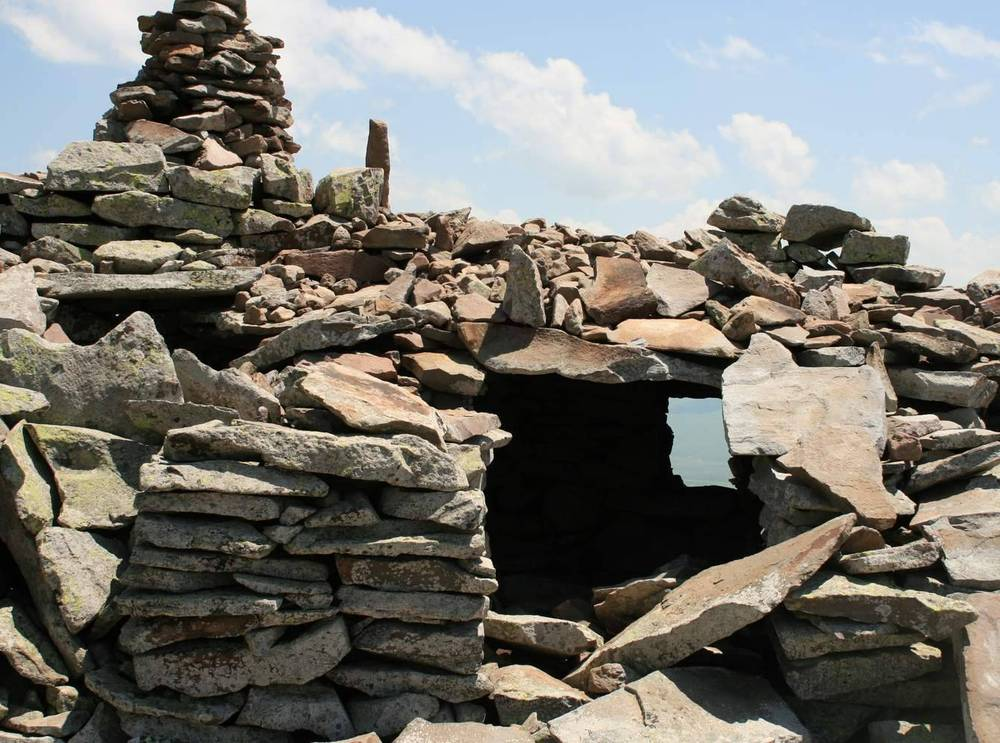
Abuli megalithic fortress

The Abuli fortress, locally known also as Korogli (ultimately from Turkic Koroğlu), shares many architectural features with the Shaori fortress, another major cyclopean hillfort strategically located in the area around Paravani Lake.

The Abuli fortress is a large and complex structure, built of 3-5-meter-high volcanic basalt blocks, without using mortar. It consists of the central fortified area, which includes the "citadel" with an area of 60×40 meter. The central area can be accessed through two gates from the south and the east. Dwellings or hideouts, of various size and shape, sometimes organized in two or three levels, comprise the so-called "residential area" and spread to the east of the "citadel".

== Archaeological background ==
No archaeological excavations have been carried out at Abuli and Shaori, making it difficult to precisely date or assign them to any particular culture. In general, the spread of cyclopean fortresses is an archaeological testimony to the social changes in the South Caucasus in the Middle-to-Late Bronze Age, reflecting social differentiation and emergence of newly empowered elites. These forts were typically constructed on the steep slopes of mountains. Settlement distribution and cultural material suggest that those in charge of these hill forts exercised control over arable land and resources, but they may also have provided economic and defensive functions for their hinterlands. In September 2019, a multiyear archaeological research project was launched by Georgia's culture heritage authorities for further study and conservation of the country's megalithic complexes, including those at Abuli, Shaori, Avranlo, and Sameba.
