= Avranlo fortress =

- ავრანლოს ციხე
- Avranlo fortress
- Location: Tsalka Municipality, Kvemo Kartli, Georgia
- Coordinates: 41.662487°N 43.884049°E
- Type: Cyclopean fortress

The Avranlo fortress (Georgian: ავრანლოს ციხე, romanized: avranlos tsikhe) is a megalithic structure in the Tsalka Municipality in Georgia's south-central region of Kvemo Kartli. A cyclopean fortification built using a dry masonry technique, it is located 0.5 km northwest of the eponymous village, on the left bank of the Ktsia river, at 1640 m above sea level. It dates to the last quarter of the 1st millennium BC.

Avranlo is a megalithic complex arranged in three tiers of terraces overlooking the river canyon. The lowest tier, at the base of the mount, consists of an approximately 80-meter-long semicircular wall, which stands 3 meters high in places. There is a single gate, 1.9 m high and 1.75 m wide, which is roofed with a monolith 2.2 m long and 1.8 m wide. Large stones are scattered elsewhere. Between this wall and the mount there is a small medieval Christian church and several caves nearby, collectively referred to as the Abibos monastery.

The second and third tiers are genuine "cyclopean" structures, characterized by large rocks, dry-stone masonry, and an unusual mode of arrangement. The third, uppermost tier tops the mount. It has a rectangular ground plan, 25 m in length and 18 m in width. The walls are 3-4 m thick. The structure is significantly damaged and many parts of it have been obliterated. Archaeological digs at the adjacent fields, north of the megalithic fortress, yielded, in 2006, a Kura–Araxes culture-type settlement and a necropolis dating from the 12th-11th century BC.

The fortress was inscribed on the list of the Immovable Cultural Monuments of National Significance of Georgia in 2007. In September 2019, a multiyear archaeological research project was launched by Georgia's culture heritage authorities for further study and conservation of the country's megalithic complexes, including those at Abuli, Shaori, Avranlo, and Sameba.
