= Khertvisi =

Khertvisi ხერთვისი
- Location in Georgia
- Coordinates: 41°28′40″N 43°17′07″E
- Country: Georgia
- Region: Samtskhe-Javakheti
- Municipality: Aspindza
- Elevation: 1,250 m (4,100 ft)

Population (2014)
  - Total: 202
- Time zone: UTC+4 (Georgian Time)

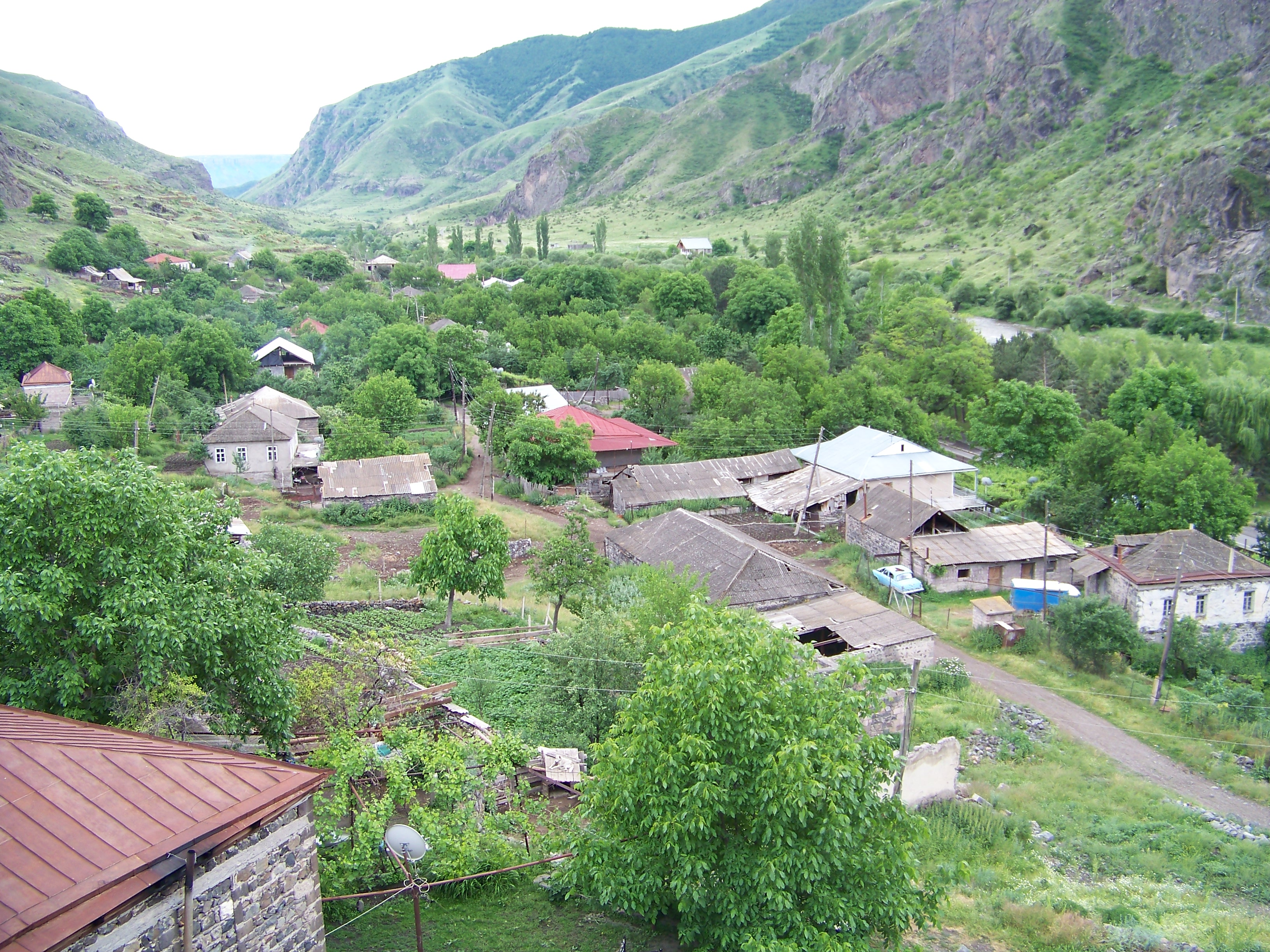
Khertvisi Village

Khertvisi is a village in Aspindza Municipality of Samtskhe-Javakheti region, the Republic of Georgia. Situated at the confluence of the rivers Mtkvari and Paravani, the village was set on a number of terraces.

According to the chronicles, in ancient times Khertvisi was a town. The last mention was in the second half of the 18th century. The large Khertvisi Fortress was built here presumably in the 10th-11th centuries. In 1771, when the fortress was temporarily taken back from Turks by King Erekle II, a large amount of valuables and goods was evacuated. This hinted historians that Khertvisi was indeed a town.
