= Shaori fortress =

Monument in Georgia

- შაორის ციხე
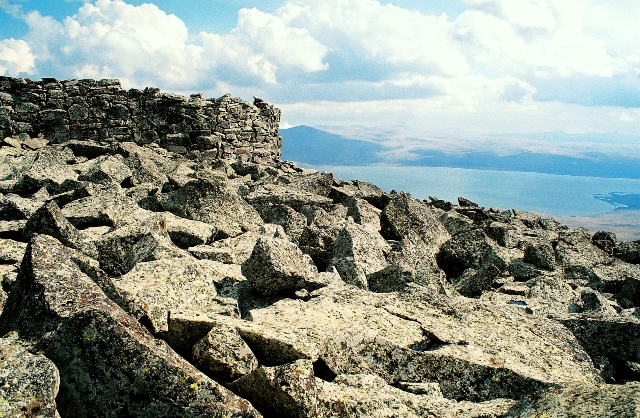
- Shaori fortress
- Interactive map of Shaori fortress
- Location: Akhalkalaki Municipality, Samtskhe-Javakheti, Georgia
- Coordinates: 41.484858°N 43.746262°E
- Type: Cyclopean fortress

The Shaori fortress (Georgian: შაორის ციხე, romanized: shaoris tsikhe) (Georgian: შაორის ციხე) is a prehistoric megalithic structure in the Akhalkalaki Municipality of Samtskhe–Javakheti, Georgia, situated on the rocky summit of Mount Shaori at an elevation of 2,752 metres (9,029 ft) above sea level in the Lesser Caucasus mountains, northwest of Paravani Lake. Constructed using large basalt blocks without mortar in the cyclopean dry-stone tradition, the fortress features an unusual rhomboid plan with circular interior spaces. It is divided into two parts located on separate peaks, with the central fortified area accessed via a narrow gate on the eastern slope. The structure, now in ruins, shares topographical and architectural similarities with nearby Bronze Age hillforts, including the Abuli fortress.

The date of Shaori's construction remains uncertain due to the absence of archaeological excavations. However, similarities with the Trialeti burial mounds suggest a construction period in the first half of the 2nd millennium BC. Like other cyclopean hillforts in the South Caucasus, Shaori reflects Middle-to-Late Bronze Age processes of social stratification and elite control over arable land and strategic resources. While its steep location and internal layout make domestic use unlikely, some scholars have proposed a ritual or religious function for the site.

Shaori fortress is listed among the Immovable Cultural Monuments of National Significance of Georgia. It was first mentioned in historical sources by the 18th-century Georgian geographer Prince Vakhushti of Kartli and was systematically studied in the 20th century by Leon Melikset-Bek.

== Architecture ==
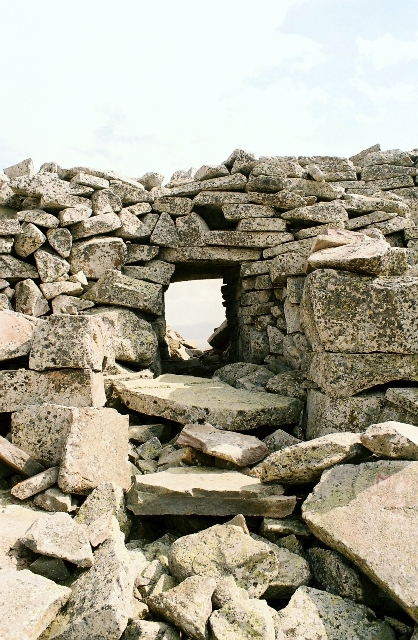
An "arrowslit" in the Shaori citadel.

The Shaori fortress, formerly locally known also as Korogli (ultimately from Turkic Koroğlu), shares many topographical and architectural features with the Abuli fortress, another major cyclopean hillfort strategically located in the area around Paravani Lake.

The Shaori fortress is built of large basalt blocks, without using mortar. It consists of two parts, each located on top of a steep peak. The central part is an irregular rectangle constructed in the highest area and can be accessed through a one-meter-wide and 1.3 meter-high gate from the east. The location and spatial organization of Shaori makes it an unlikely domestic center. Rather, it could have been used for religious purposes.

== Historical and archaeological background ==
The Shaori fortress first appears in literary sources in the geography of the early 18th-century Georgian scholar Prince Vakhushti of Kartli. Leon Melikset-Bek was the first who attempted to systematically study the monolithic monuments of Georgia, Shaori included, in 1938.

No archaeological excavations have been carried out at Shaori, making it difficult to precisely date or assign the monument to any particular culture. Similarity in construction technique and material with the Trialeti burial mounds has been observed, pointing to the first half of the 2nd millennium BC as a possible period of construction.

In general, the spread of cyclopean fortresses is an archaeological testimony to the social changes in the South Caucasus in the Middle-to-Late Bronze Age, reflecting social differentiation and emergence of newly empowered elites. These forts were typically constructed on the steep slopes of mountains. Settlement distribution and cultural material suggest that those in charge of these hill forts exercised control over arable land and resources, but they may also have provided economic and defensive functions for their hinterlands.
