= Khanchali Managed Reserve =

Protected nature area in Georgia

- Georgian: ხანჩალის ტბის აღკვეთილი
- IUCN category IV (habitat/species management area)
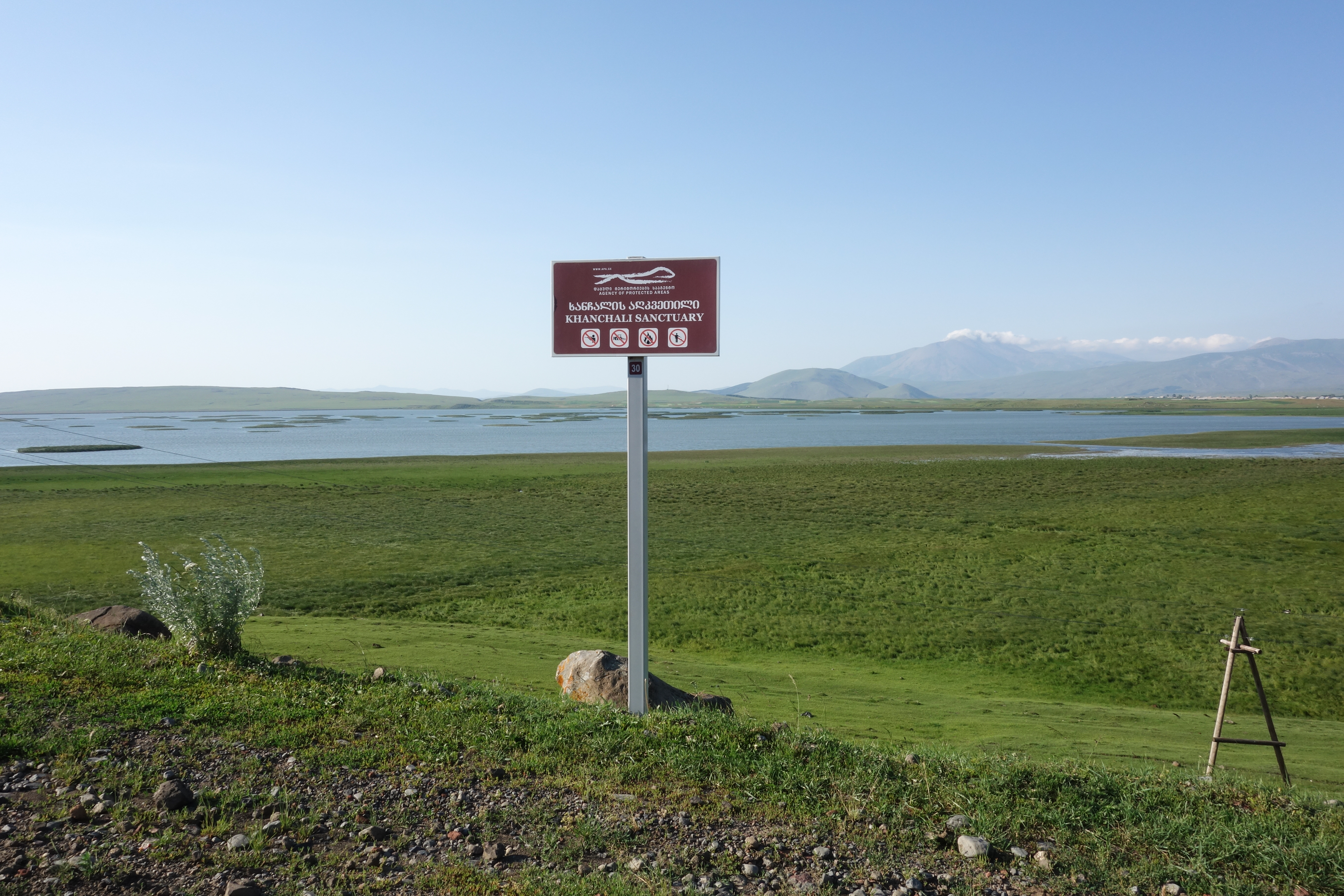
- Khanchali Sanctuary.

- Location within Georgia Location within Samtskhe-Javakheti
- Location: Georgia
- Coordinates: 41°15′25″N 43°33′00″E
- Area: 7.27 km^{2} (2.81 sq mi)
- Established: 2011
- Governing body: Agency of Protected Areas
- Website: Javakheti Protected Areas Administration

Khanchali Managed Reserve (Georgian: ხანჩალის ტბის აღკვეთილი) is a protected area in Ninotsminda Municipality in Samtskhe-Javakheti region of Georgia. It protects Khanchali Lake on the south-eastern part of the volcanic Javakheti Plateau, at an altitude of 1928 meters above sea level. Khanchali Lake has been considered to be included into Ramsar Convention list of Wetlands of international importance.

Khanchali Managed Reserve is part of Javakheti Protected Areas which also includes Javakheti National Park, Kartsakhi Managed Reserve, Sulda Managed Reserve, Bugdasheni Managed Reserve, Madatapa Managed Reserve.

== Fauna ==
Lake provide habitat to many birds, such as Long-legged Buzzard (Buteo rufinus), Green Warbler (Phylloscopus nitidus) to name just a few.

Panorama of Khanchali lake.

== See also ==
- Javakheti National Park
