= Madatapa Managed Reserve =

Protected nature area in Georgia

- Georgian: მადათაფის ტბის აღკვეთილი
- IUCN category IV (habitat/species management area)
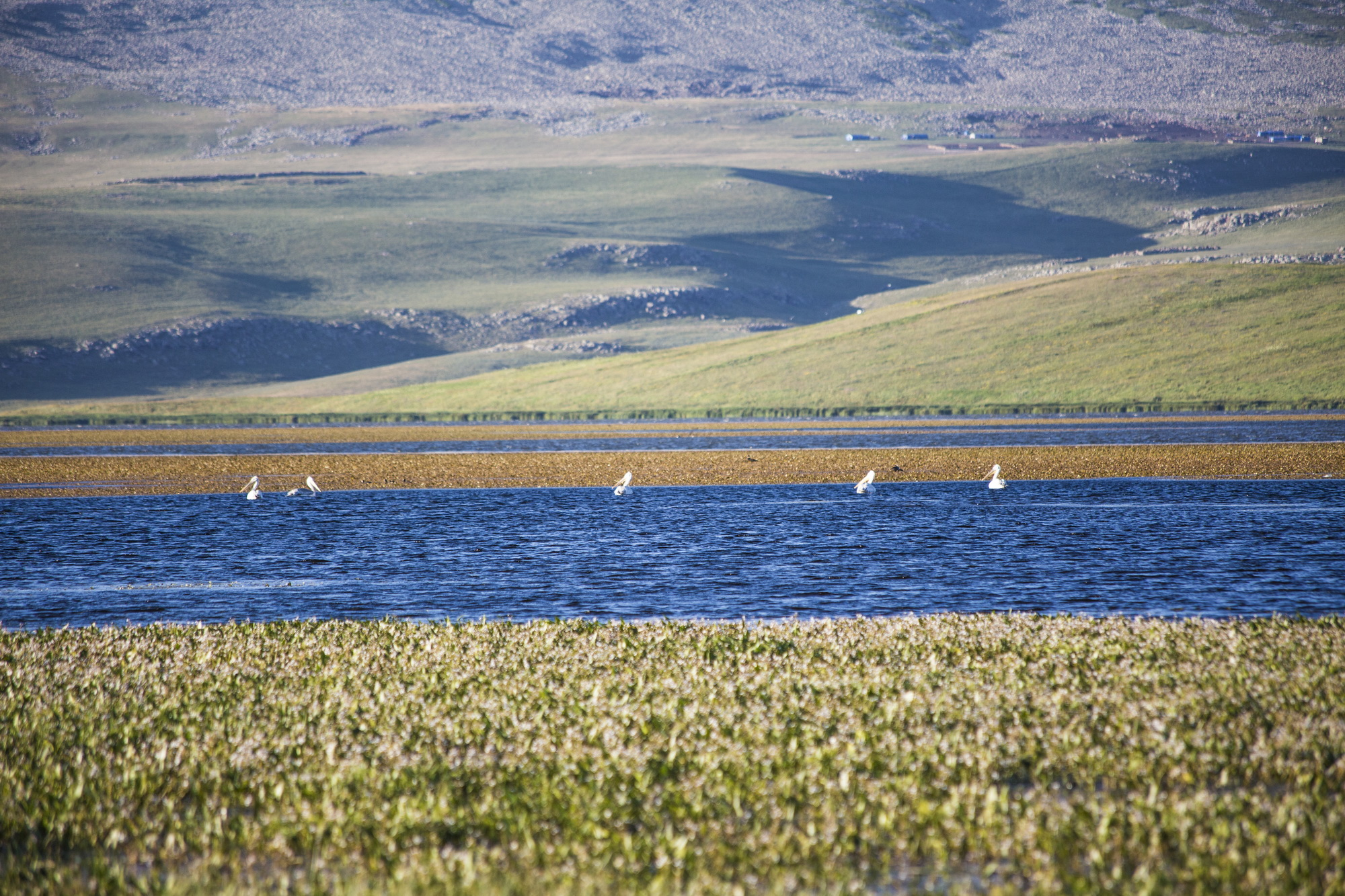
- Madatapa Lake

- Location within Georgia Location within Samtskhe-Javakheti
- Location: Georgia
- Coordinates: 41°10′46″N 43°46′59″E
- Area: 13.98 km^{2} (5.40 sq mi)
- Established: 2011
- Governing body: Agency of Protected Areas
- Website: Javakheti Protected Areas Administration

Ramsar Wetland
- Official name: Madatapa Lake
- Designated: 8 July 2020
- Reference no.: 2435

Madatapa Managed Reserve (Georgian: მადათაფის ტბის აღკვეთილი) is a protected area in Ninotsminda Municipality in Samtskhe-Javakheti region of Georgia. It protects Madatapa Lake situated in the south-eastern part of the volcanic Javakheti Plateau, at an altitude of 2108 m above sea level.

Madatapa Managed Reserve is part of Javakheti Protected Areas which also includes Javakheti National Park, Kartsakhi Managed Reserve, Sulda Managed Reserve, Khanchali Managed Reserve, Bugdasheni Managed Reserve.

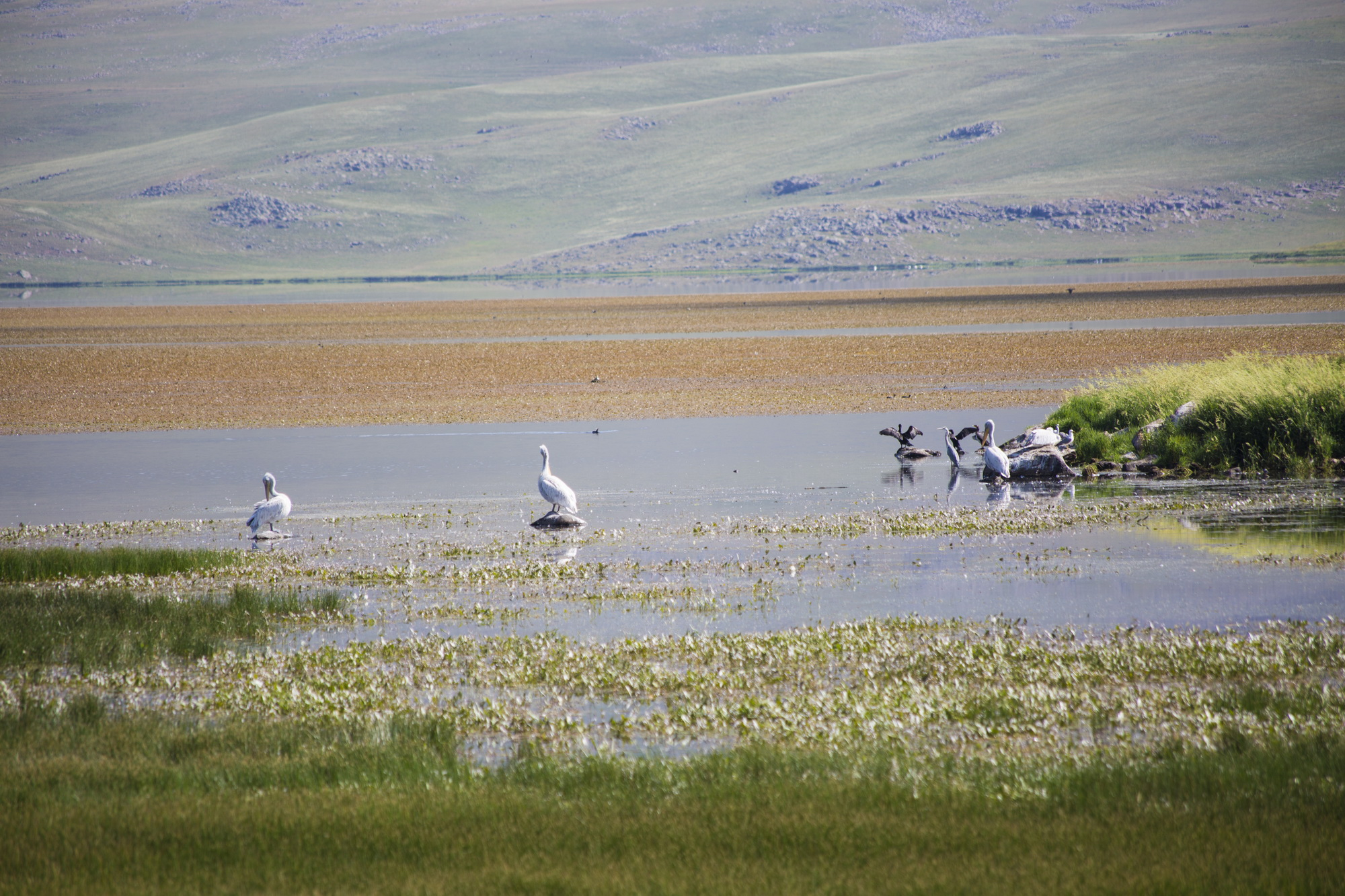
Pelicans at Madatapa lake.

== Fauna ==
Madatapa Lake is one of the most important in Georgia for breeding and staging waterbirds such as the endangered Dalmatian pelican. Since 2020 the Lake has been designated as a protected Ramsar site.

== See also ==
- Javakheti National Park
