= Biketi Lake =

Lake in Georgia

- ბიქეთის ტბა (Georgian)
- Location within Georgia
- Coordinates: 41°13′13″N 43°46′28″E
- Basin countries: Georgia

Biketi Lake (Georgian: ბიქეთის ტბა) is a small lake in Samtskhe-Javakheti, southeastern Georgia. It is located north of Madatapa Lake.
