= Khanchali Lake =

Lake in Georgia

- Khanchali Lake

- Location within Samtskhe-Javakheti Location within Georgia
- Interactive map of Khanchali Lake
- Coordinates: 41°15′25″N 43°32′55″E
- Primary outflows: Agrichai
- Basin countries: Georgia
- Surface area: 5 km^{2} (1.9 sq mi)
- Average depth: 0.5 m (1 ft 8 in)
- Max. depth: 1.4 m (4 ft 7 in)
- Surface elevation: 1,931 m (6,335 ft)

Khanchali Lake (Georgian: ხანჩალი) is a tectonic-volcanic lake in Ninotsminda Municipality, Samtskhe–Javakheti region of Georgia. Located in the central part of the Javakheti Plateau, at 1931 m above sea level. The area of its surface is 5 km^{2}. The maximum depth of the lake is 1.4 m. The lake is fed by water from snow, rainfall and underground waters. Water levels are higher during spring and lower at the end of February.

There are 10 rivers that flow into the lake. The Agrichai river flows from the eastern side of the lake and after several kilometres it joins the Paravani river left side. The annual level amplitude is 1 m. Khanchali is the most disturbed one as it experienced heavy anthropogenic changes in the last 50 years. In particular, the shape and water level of Khanchali was altered several times to meet industrial needs during the Soviet time and after. Between 1968 and 1980, the lake was completely dried up for agricultural purposes. In 1997 the lake was swelled; Currently, it is half of its original size after the amelioration of the north-western part of the lake for agricultural purposes. Khanchali Lake is part of Khanchali Managed Reserve.

The villages of Didi Khanchali and Patara Khanchali lie around the lake, and the town Ninotsminda is located nearby.

== See also ==
- List of lakes of Georgia (country)
