= Khertvisi Fortress =

Fortresses in Aspindza Municipality, Georgia

Coordinates: 41°28′36″N 43°17′9″E

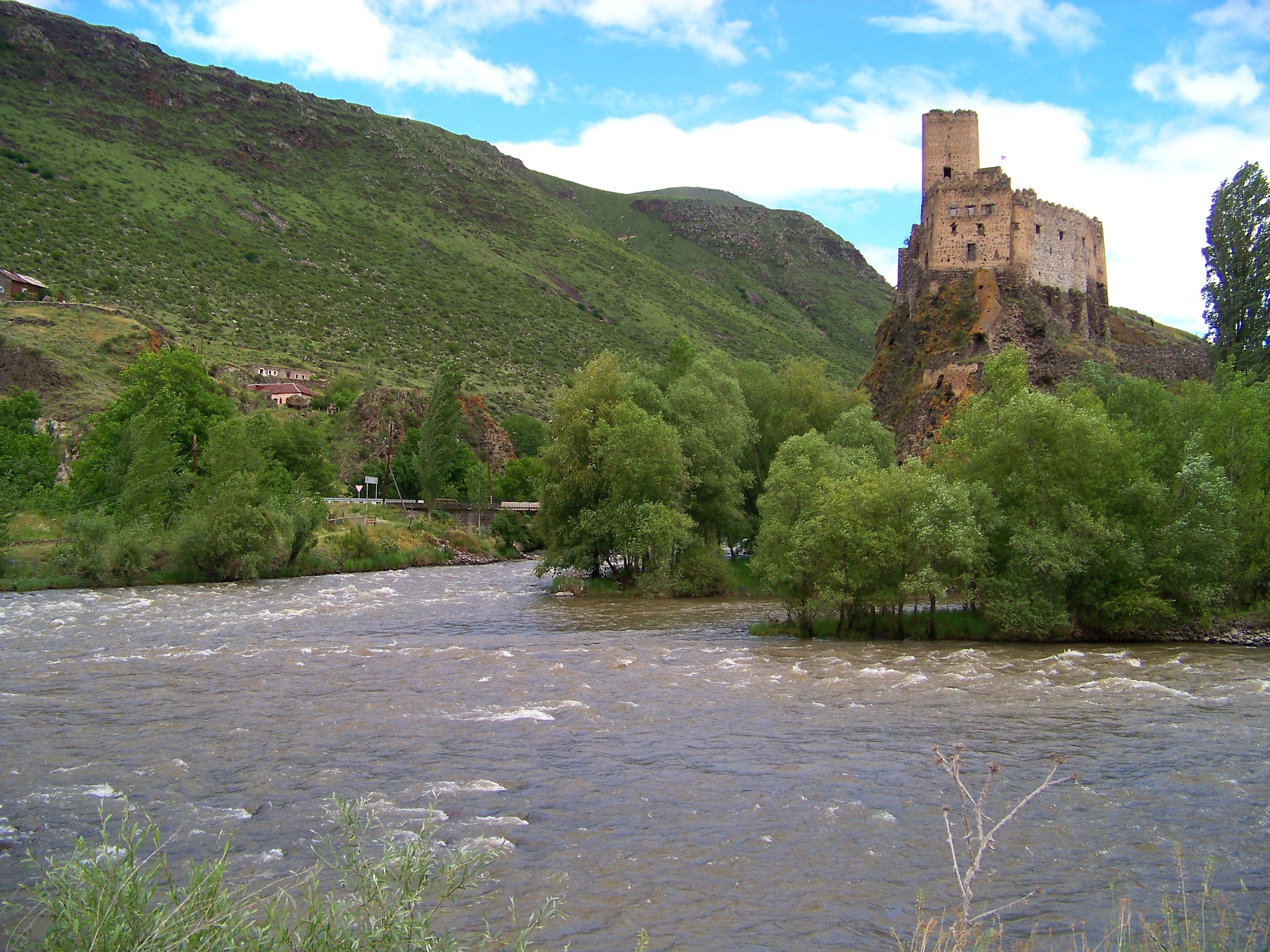

Site information
- Owner: Government of Georgia
- Condition: Ruins

Site history
- Built: 2nd century BC

Khertvisi fortress (Georgian: ხერთვისის ციხე) is one of the oldest fortresses in Georgia and was functional throughout the Georgian feudal period. It is situated in Khertvisi village of Aspindza Municipality, Southern Georgia, in Meskheti region. The fortress was first mentioned in the 10th-11th centuries. The church was built in 985, and the present walls were built in 1354. According to a local legend, Khertvisi was once destroyed by Alexander the Great, though it has then been reconstructed and invaded on numerous occasions through the centuries.

== Middle Ages and later use ==
In the 10th-11th centuries it was the center of Meskheti region. During the 12th century it became a town. In the 13th century Mongols destroyed it and until the 15th century it lost its power. According the inscription on a stone, found in the fortress, significant reconstruction was made by Zakari Kamkamishvili in 1354–1356. From the end of the 13th up to the 15th century it was owned by Meskheti landlords from Jaqeli family. In the 16th century the southern region of Georgia was invaded by Ottomans. During next 300 years they have owned Khertvisi too. In 1624 the fortress was temporarily taken by Giorgi Saakadze. Another successful though again temporary attempt was made by the King Heraclius II in 1771.

Khertvisi was finally set free from Ottomans in 1828. At the end of the 19th century Armed Forces of the Russian army returned the lost territories and Khertvisi became the military base for Russian troops.

== Architecture ==
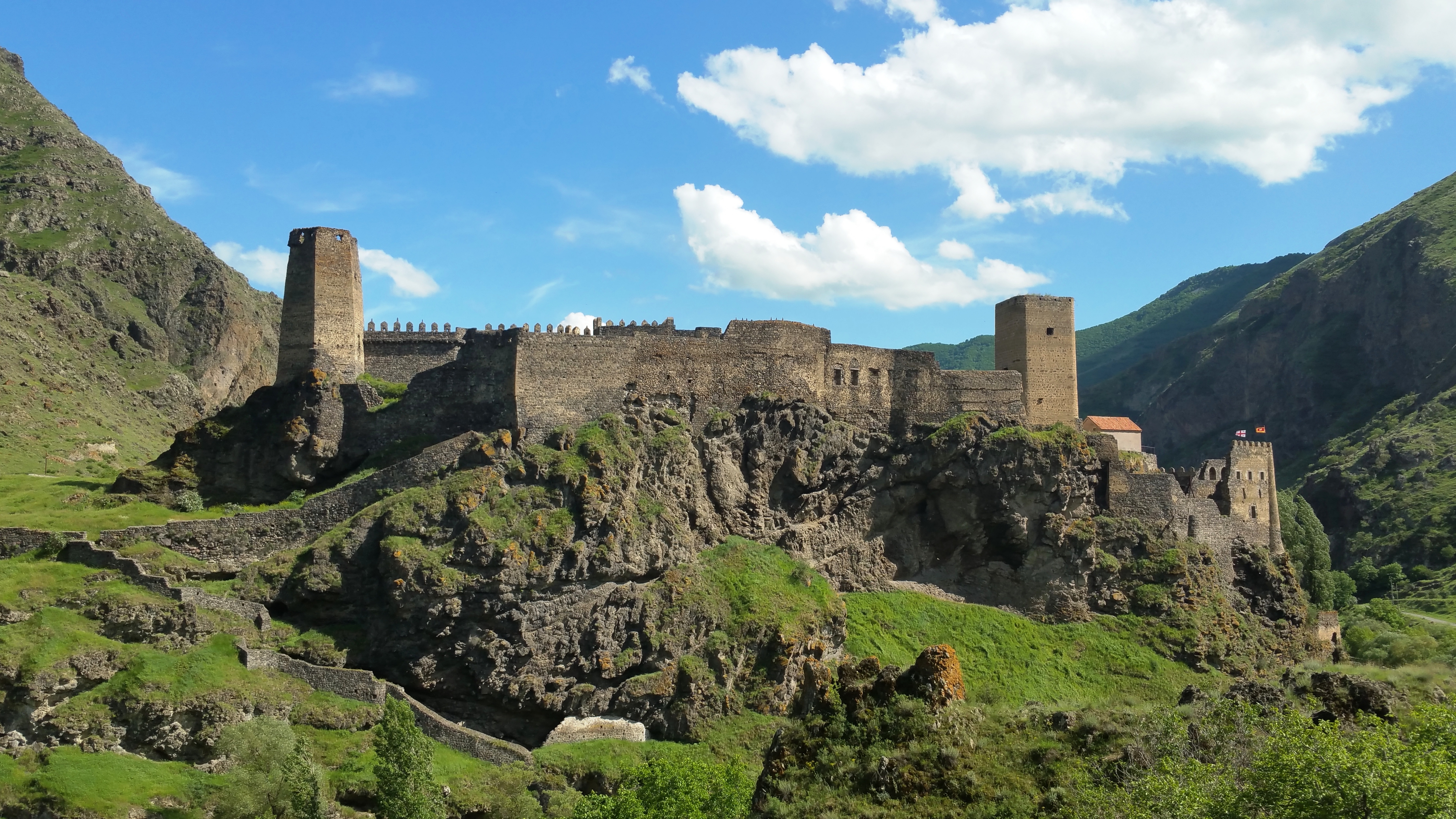
The full length of Khertvisi, as seen from the north

Khertvisi fortress is situated on the high rocky hill in the narrow canyon at the confluence of the rivers Mtkvari and Paravani.

It is composed of the citadel with towers and the lower yard, surrounding the citadel from the south and east. The citadel, resting on the mountain top, is itself made of smaller separate parts. Two tunnels from the north lead down to the river.

== Sources ==
- www.tourism.gov.ge
- www.friends-partners.org
- International Association of Tourists and Travelers
