= Madatapa Lake =

Georgian Lake

- მადათაფა (Georgian)
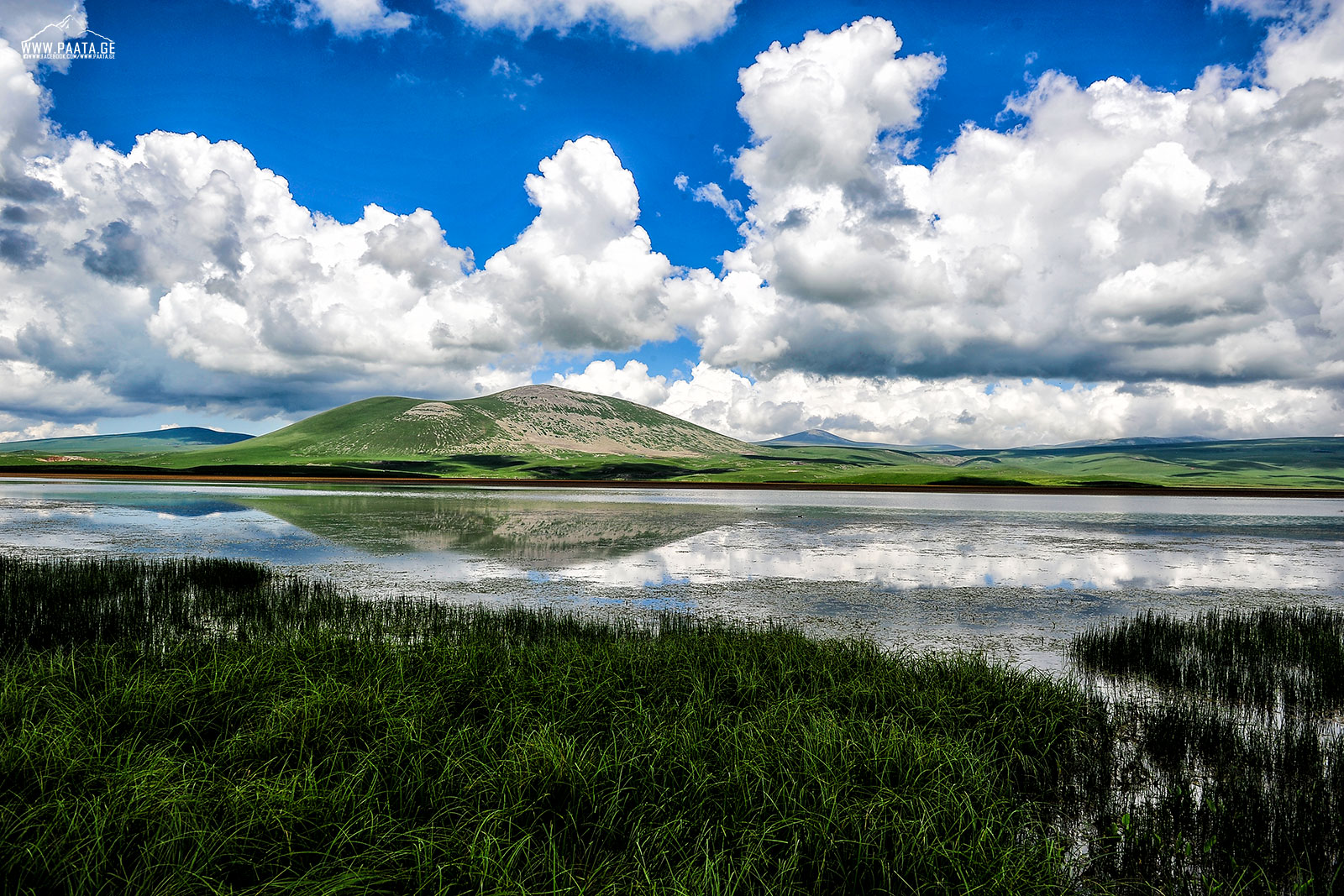

- Location within Samtskhe-Javakheti Location within Georgia
- Interactive map of Madatapa Lake
- Coordinates: 41°10′46″N 43°46′59″E
- Primary outflows: Madatapa river
- Catchment area: 136 km^{2} (53 sq mi)
- Basin countries: Georgia
- Surface area: 8.78 km^{2} (3.39 sq mi)
- Average depth: 1.5 m (4 ft 11 in)
- Max. depth: 1.7 m (5 ft 7 in)
- Water volume: 97 km^{3} (23 cu mi)
- Surface elevation: 2,108 m (6,916 ft)

Ramsar Wetland
- Designated: 8 July 2020
- Reference no.: 2435

Madatapa Lake (Georgian: მადათაფა) is a lake in the Samtskhe-Javakheti region of southeastern Georgia, near the border with Armenia, north of Bavra. Covering an area of 885 hectares (2,190 acres) at an elevation of 2,108 m (6,916 ft), the lake is noted for its Paravan race of common carp and has been considered as a commercial fishing production site. It is found in one of the most earthquake-prone areas of the Caucasus. A shallow lake, it, along with Khanchali Lake, is one of the most important in the country for breeding and staging waterbirds, including the endangered Dalmatian pelican. Since 2020 it has been designated as a protected Ramsar site.

The villages of Zhdanovakani, Epremovka, Troitskoye and Sameba lie around the lake. Biketi Lake lies to the north.

== See also ==
- Madatapa Managed Reserve
- Javakheti Plateau
