= Kartsakhi Managed Reserve =

Protected nature area in Georgia

- Georgian: კარწახის ჭაობის აღკვეთილი
- IUCN category IV (habitat/species management area)
- Land of Kartsakhi Managed Reserve

- Location within Georgia Location within Samtskhe-Javakheti
- Location: Georgia
- Coordinates: 41°14′49″N 43°17′38″E
- Area: 1.58 km^{2} (0.61 sq mi)
- Established: 2011
- Governing body: Agency of Protected Areas
- Website: Javakheti Protected Areas Administration

Kartsakhi Managed Reserve (Georgian: კარწახის ჭაობის აღკვეთილი) is a protected area in Ninotsminda Municipality in Samtskhe-Javakheti region of Georgia. It protects land in proximity of Kartsakhi Lake, while lake itself is part of Javakheti National Park.

Kartsakhi Managed Reserve is part of Javakheti Protected Areas which also includes Javakheti National Park, Khanchali Managed Reserve, Sulda Managed Reserve, Bugdasheni Managed Reserve, Madatapa Managed Reserve.

== See also ==
- Javakheti National Park
