= Sulda Managed Reserve =

Protected nature area in Georgia

- Georgian: სულდის ჭაობის აღკვეთილი
- IUCN category IV (habitat/species management area)
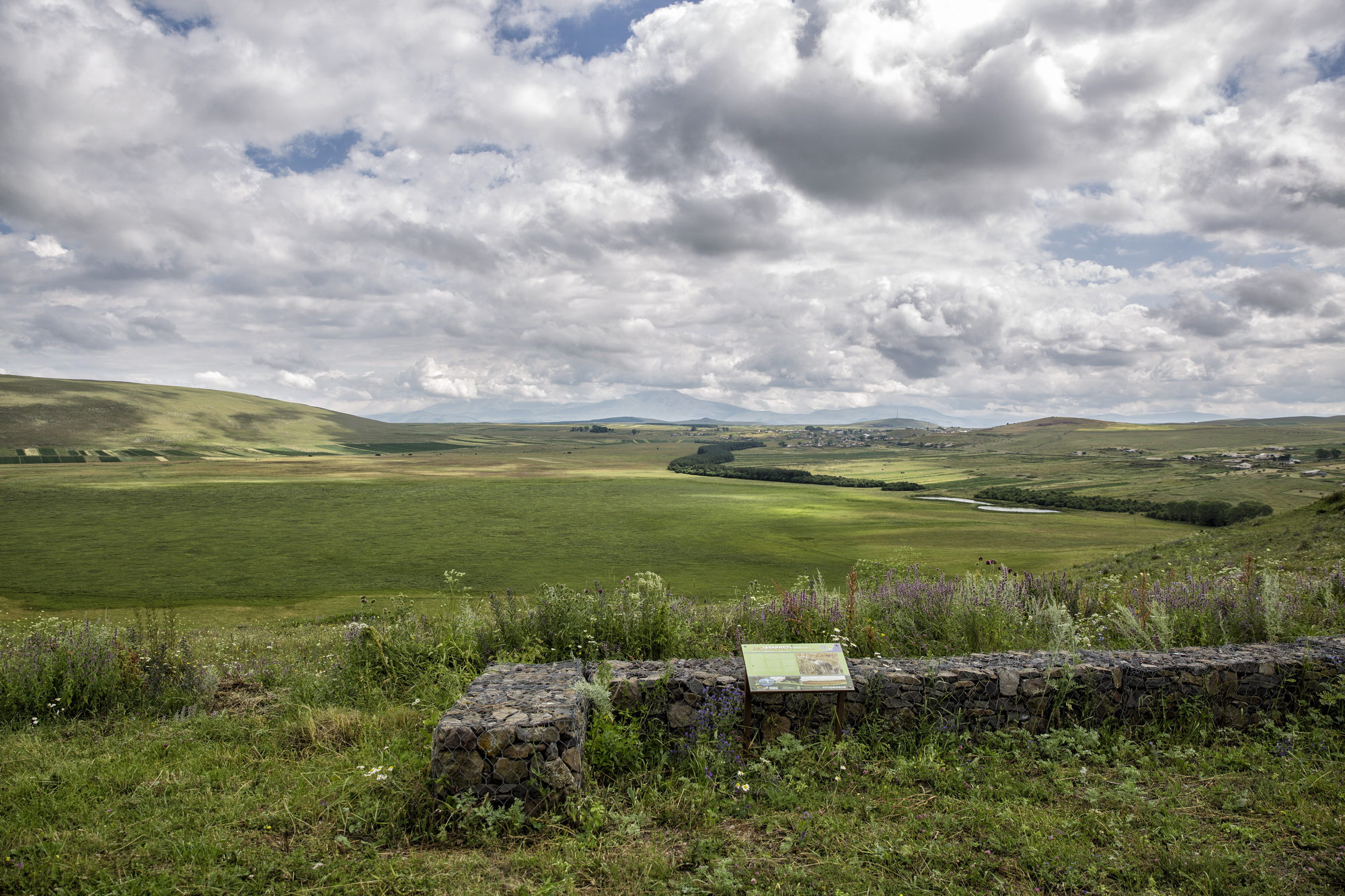
- Sulda Managed Reserve

- Location within Georgia Location within Samtskhe-Javakheti
- Location: Georgia
- Nearest city: Akhalkalaki
- Coordinates: 41°16′50″N 43°20′25″E
- Area: 3.09 km^{2} (1.19 sq mi)
- Established: 2011
- Governing body: Agency of Protected Areas
- Website: Javakheti Protected Areas Administration

Sulda Managed Reserve (Georgian: სულდის ჭაობის აღკვეთილი) is a protected area near villages Bozali and Sulda in Akhalkalaki Municipality in Samtskhe-Javakheti region of Georgia. It protects marsh wetland on an altitude of 2000 m above sea level.

Sulda Managed Reserve is part of Javakheti Protected Areas which also includes Javakheti National Park, Kartsakhi Managed Reserve, Bugdasheni Managed Reserve, Khanchali Managed Reserve, Madatapa Managed Reserve.

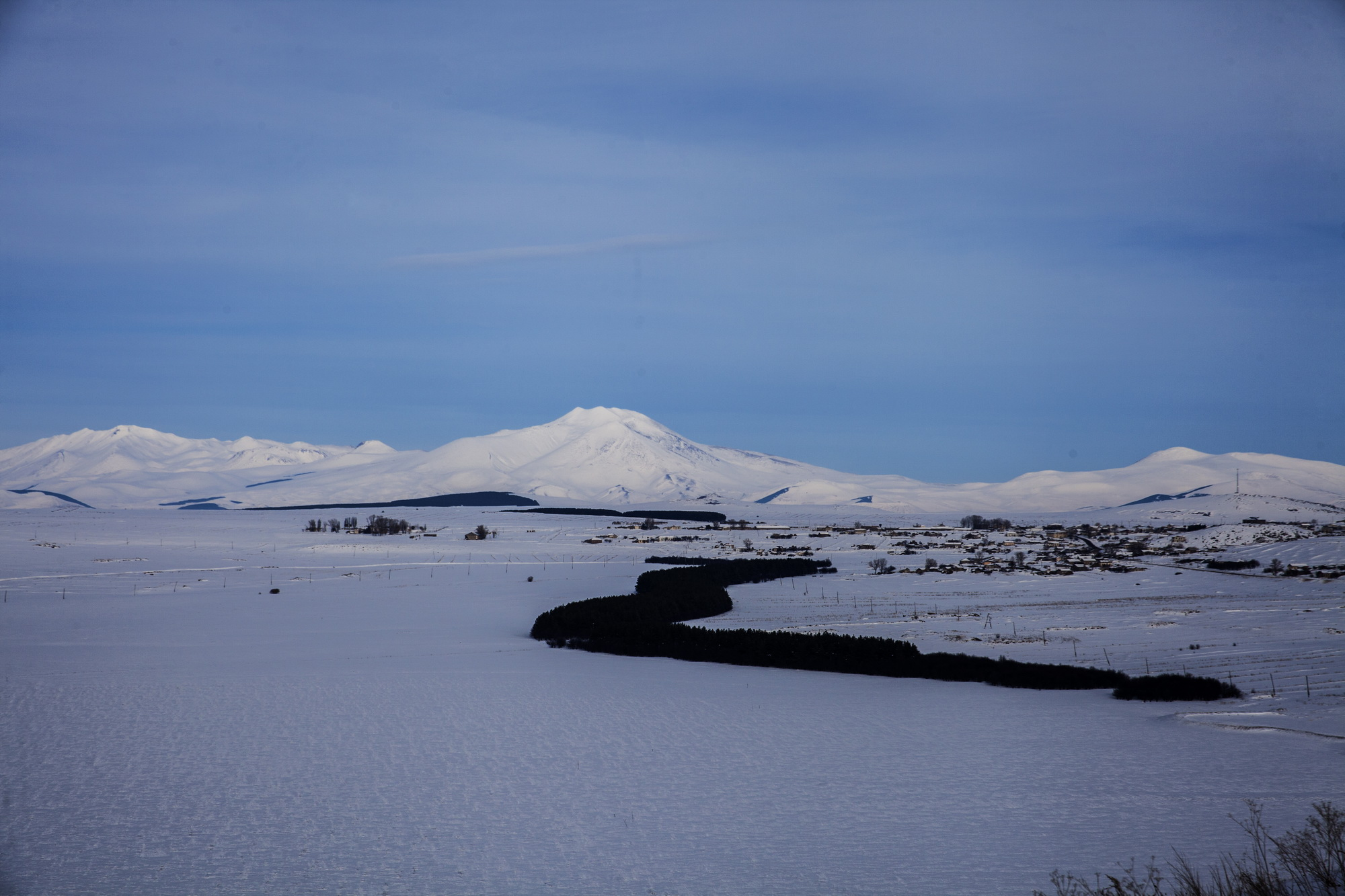
Sulda Managed Reserve at winter.

== See also ==
- Javakheti National Park
