= Ninotsminda Municipality =

Coordinates: 41°15′52″N 43°35′27″E

Ninotsminda Municipality ნინოწმინდის მუნიციპალიტეტი
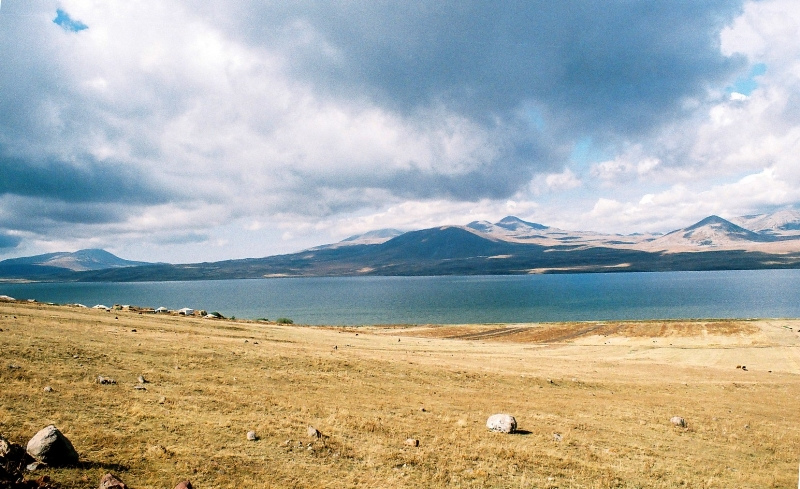
- Paravani Lake

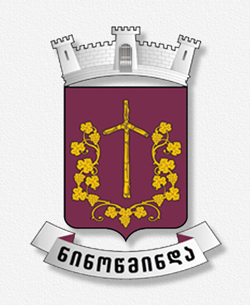
- Flag Seal

- Country: Georgia
- Mkhare: Samtskhe-Javakheti
- Capital: Ninotsminda

Government
  - Type: Mayor–Council
  - Mayor: Anivard Mosoian (GD)

Area
  - Total: 1,354 km^{2} (523 sq mi)

Population (2021)
  - Total: 18,944
  - Density: 13.99/km^{2} (36.24/sq mi)
- Time zone: UTC+4 (Georgian Time)

Ninotsminda (Georgian: ნინოწმინდის მუნიციპალიტეტი, Ninots’mindis munitsip’alit’et’i) is a municipality in southern Georgia, in the region of Samtskhe-Javakheti with an area of 1,354 km^{2} (523 sq mi) and a population of 18,944 (2021). Its main town and administrative center is Ninotsminda, which was granted the status of a city in 1983. Until 1917, the territory of the district was included in Akhalkalaki Mazra of Tbilisi (Georgia) and between 1917 and 1930 in Akhalkalaki Mazra. It has been a separate district since 1930, under the name Bogdanovka. In 1991 it received the name Ninotsminda. 95% of the inhabitants in Ninotsminda are of Armenian descent, the highest amount in a Georgian municipality.

== Geography ==
The area of Ninotsminda district is 1354 km2. It is located in southern Georgia, on the Javakheti volcanic plateau, in the extreme southeastern part of the Akhalkalaki Plateau, east of Lake Khanchal, that has an altitude of 1950-2200 m above sea level. The lowest point of the municipality is 1750 meter above sea level near the village of Kulalisi, the highest is at Mt Godorebi (3189 meter), a few kilometers northeast of Mt Didi Abuli the highest mountain of the Samsari Range. This range shapes the northwestern geographic delimitation of the municipality with Akhalkalaki and Tsalka, while the Javakheti Range shapes the eastern boundary with Dmanisi Municipality. The south-western border of the region is the state border of Georgia and Turkey. The southern border follows the Nialiskuri ridge, which borders Armenia. The relief of the municipality is characterized by fossilized volcanoes and heights. The district is located in a 7-8 magnitude seismic zone.

The area is also characterized by lakes which are among the largest in Georgia. Paravani Lake is the largest lake of Georgia, at an altitude of 2074 meters above sealevel. Various nature reserves exist, such as Javakheti National Park, Khanchali Managed Reserve and Madatapa Managed Reserve. The center of Ninotsminda district is located in Ninotsminda, which is 91 km away from Akhaltsikhe, 161 km from Tbilisi via Tsalka, and 320 km via Akhaltsikhe.

== Climate ==
The Ninotsminda region has a continental upland climate with cold winters with snow and cool summers. The average temperature in January is minus 10.6 °C, in August plus 13.1 °C. In winter temperatures can reach minus 38 °C.

== Administrative divisions ==
Ninotsminda municipality is administratively divided into one city (the municipal centre Ninotsminda) and 9 communities (თემი, temi) with 31 villages (სოფელი, sopeli).

== Politics ==
Paravani River

Ninotsminda Municipal Assembly (Georgian: ნინოწმინდის საკრებულო, Ninotsminda Sakrebulo) is the representative body of Ninotsminda Municipality, consisting of 30 members which are elected every four years. The last election was held in October 2021. Anivard Mosoian of Georgian Dream was elected mayor.

Party	2017	2021	Current Municipal Assembly
Georgian Dream	24	25	
People's Power		2 (Note: Split from Georgian Dream.)	
United National Movement		1	
For Georgia		1	
European Georgia	1	1	
Alliance of Patriots	1		
Total	26	30	

== Population ==
By the start of 2021 the population of the municipality was determined at 18,944 people, a decrease of almost 23% compared to the 2014 census. The population of the city of Ninotsminda lost more than 13% of its population during the same period. The population density of the municipality is 14 inhabitants per square kilometre (36/sq mi). According to the 2014 census, 79% of the population lives in rural settlements.

The vast majority (95%) of the population of Ninotsminda are Armenians, making it the highest proportion of Armenians of all Georgian municipalities. The remaining 5% are mainly Georgians (4.2%) and Russians (0.8%). In terms of religion, 81% of the population is made up of followers of the Armenian Apostolic Church, followed by Catholics (12%), Georgian Orthodox Church (3.6%), Muslim Georgians (2.2%). Furthermore, there are small numbers of Jehovah's Witnesses and Jews.

Population Ninotsminda Municipality
	1886	1923	1939	1959	1970	1979	1989	2002	2014	2021
Ninotsminda Municipality	28,569	-	▲34,575	▼32,064	▲37,267	▼36,268	▲38,935	▼34,305	▼24,491	▼18,944
Ninotsminda city	-	383	▲964	▲1,658	▲2,824	▲3,826	▲7,285	▼6,287	▼5,144	▼4,470
Data: Population statistics Georgia 1897 to present. Note: (Note: The 2014 census found an inexplicable gap with the data from the national statistical office Geostat. UN-assisted research has found the 2002 census was inflated by about 8-9 percent. See, "1. Introduction", Page 1.) Note 2: Until 1991 Ninotsminda had the name Bogdanovka.

== See also ==
- List of municipalities in Georgia (country)
