= Javakheti Plateau =

Volcanic plateau

Javakheti Plateau ჯავახეთის პლატო (Georgian)
- Plateau
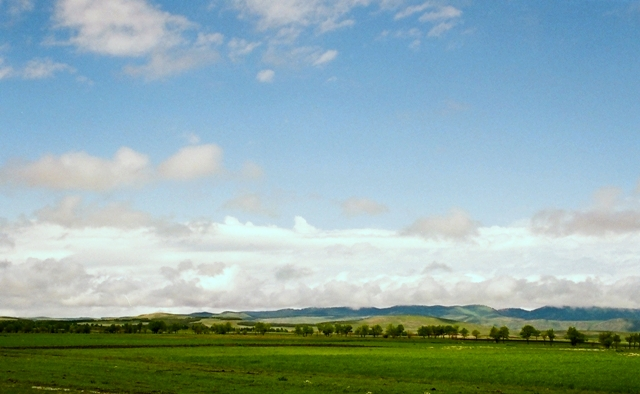
- Javakheti Plateau.

- Location within Samtskhe-Javakheti Location within Georgia
- Coordinates: 41°30′00″N 43°30′00″E
- Location: Samtskhe-Javakheti, Georgia
- Geology: volcanic plateau

Javakheti Plateau (Georgian: ჯავახეთის პლატო) is a volcanic plateau within the Caucasus Mountains that covers the Samtskhe-Javakheti region of Georgia, along the border with Turkey and Armenia. Its elevation is over 2,000 m.

== Geography ==
The plateau is a large grassland plain (alpine steppe) with many wetlands and alpine lakes (six of the largest lakes of Georgia, Tabatskuri, Paravani, Khanchali, Madatapa, Kartsakhi, Saghamo).

The Javalkheti Wetlands are included in the Ramsar List of Wetlands of International Importance.

The plain is crossed from north to south by the Abuli-Samsari Mountain Range, a series of volcanic cones. The western side of the plateau is surrounded by the Javakheti Range.

== Archaeology and history ==
=== Early prehistory ===
Human occupation of the plateau dates back to at least the Lower Paleolithic, evidenced by Acheulean handaxes and Levallois points, found more than 2100 m above sea level.

=== Late prehistory ===
More than 168 settlements and fortifications have been identified from remote sensing imagery with recurring habitation between the Late Prehistoric and the medieval period. These were predominantly built in the Cyclopean style, bounded by defensive walls, and often contain domestic structures with decorated fired clay plaques.

Significant sites include Baraleti Natsargora (meaning “hill of ashes”), a prominent mound at the centre of the plateau with multiple occupation layers from the Early Bronze Age to the Iron Age (c. 3500–500 BCE in the South Caucasus) divided by repeated burning episodes. A significant find from this site was the Baraleti Disc, a bronze solar disk c.170 mm in size, with three concentric bands of knobs interspersed by two bands of perforated geometric motifs, a hanging loop, and four concentric circles in a line from top to bottom. This represents a regional tradition of symbolic metalwork linked to celestial imagery and funerary display, with similar examples predominantly recovered from elite female burials.

Another significant site is the Meghreki Fortress, with continuous re-occupation from the Early Bronze Age (c. 3500–2500 BCE) Kura–Araxes culture, through the Iron Age (c. 1200–500 BCE) Achaemenid horizon, and into the medieval period (c. 4th-15th centuries CE). Two domestic structures have been excavated with numerous decorated fired clay plaques with geometric incisions, and traces of red, white and dark blue pigments, paralleled at Digasheni and Amiranis Gora.

== See also ==
- Vanis Kvabebi
- Abul-Samsari Range
- Mount Didi Abuli
- Javakheti Range
