= Paravani Lake =

Lake in Georgia

Paravani lake
- ფარავნის ტბა (Georgian)
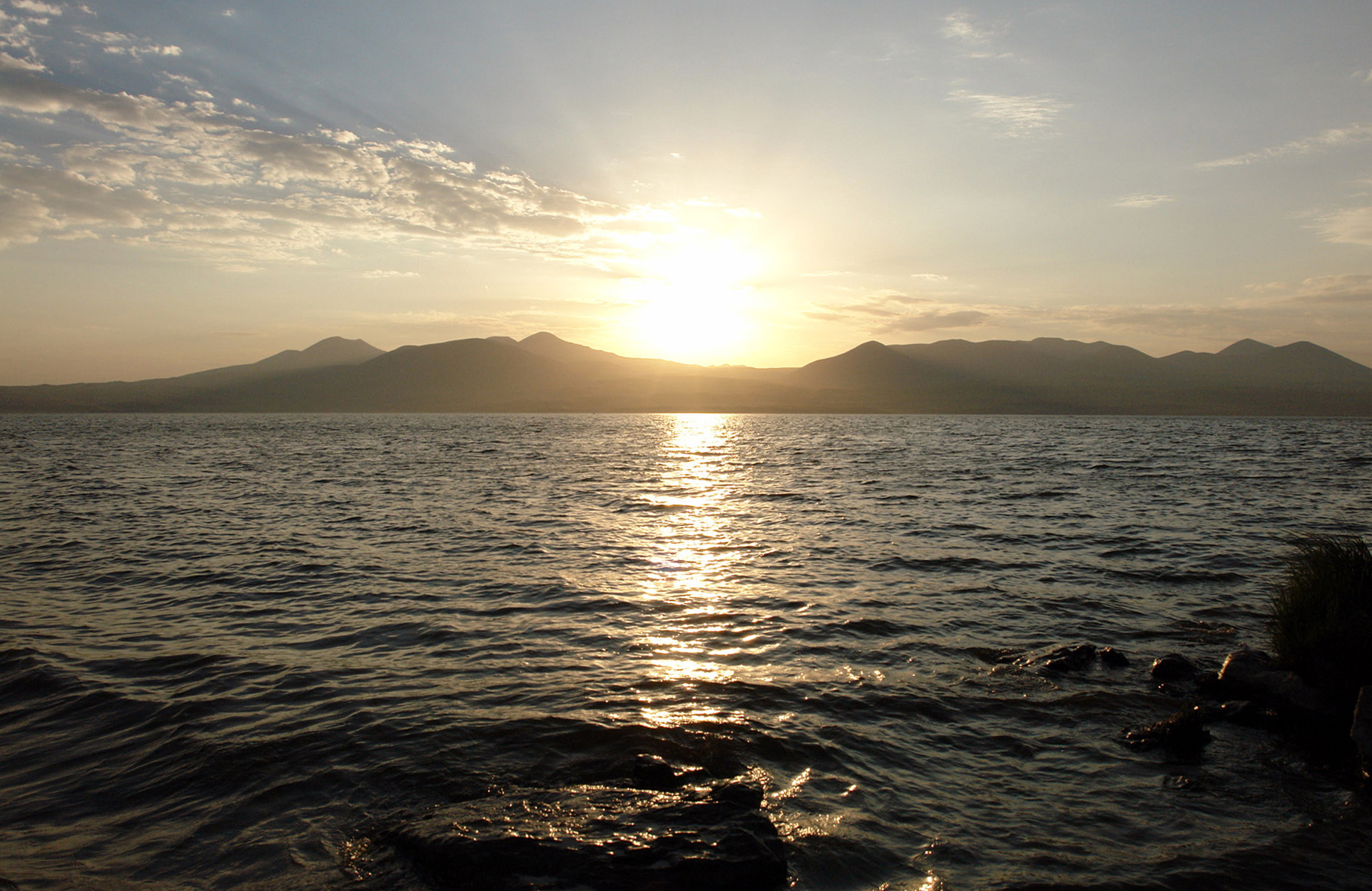

- Location within Samtskhe-Javakheti Location within Georgia
- Interactive map of Paravani lake
- Coordinates: 41°27′50″N 43°48′50″E
- Primary inflows: Shaori, Sabadostskali, Rodionovskis Tskali, precipitation, underground springs
- Primary outflows: Paravani
- Catchment area: 234 km^{2} (90 sq mi)
- Basin countries: Georgia
- Surface area: 37.5 km^{2} (14.5 sq mi)
- Average depth: 2.2 m (7 ft 3 in)
- Max. depth: 3.3 m (11 ft)
- Water volume: 0.091 km^{3} (0.022 cu mi)
- Surface elevation: 2,073 m (6,801 ft)

Paravani lake (Georgian: ფარავნის ტბა) is a volcanic lake in Georgia, located in Javakheti Plateau between Abul-Samsari and Javakheti Ranges.

== Geography and hydrography ==
Paravani Lake is located 2,073 m (6,801 ft) above sea level, has a surface area of 37.5 km^{2} (14.5 sq mi) and a drainage basin of 234 km^{2} (90 sq mi). Its maximum and average depths are 3.3 m (11 ft) and 2.2 m (7 ft 3 in), respectively. The volume of the lake is 91,000,000 m^{3} (3.2×10^{9} cu ft). The water level is low during October and November and high during May and June. The lake is frozen during winter and the thickness of the ice ranges from 47 to 73 cm (19 to 29 in).

In addition to the small rivers of Shaori, Sabadostskali, and Rodionovskis Tskali, the lake gets its water from snow, rain, and underground springs.

The river Paravani, the outflow of the lake, begins from the southern part of the lake, and connects to the Mtkvari to the right. The lake is a popular destination for fishing.

== Mystery of lake Paravani ==
Spectral analysis shows that deep in the lake abyss lies a mysterious object. A scientist expedition determined it to be a burial ground from the Bronze Age. Geophysical studies show this large structure at the bottom of the lake.
