= Paravani =

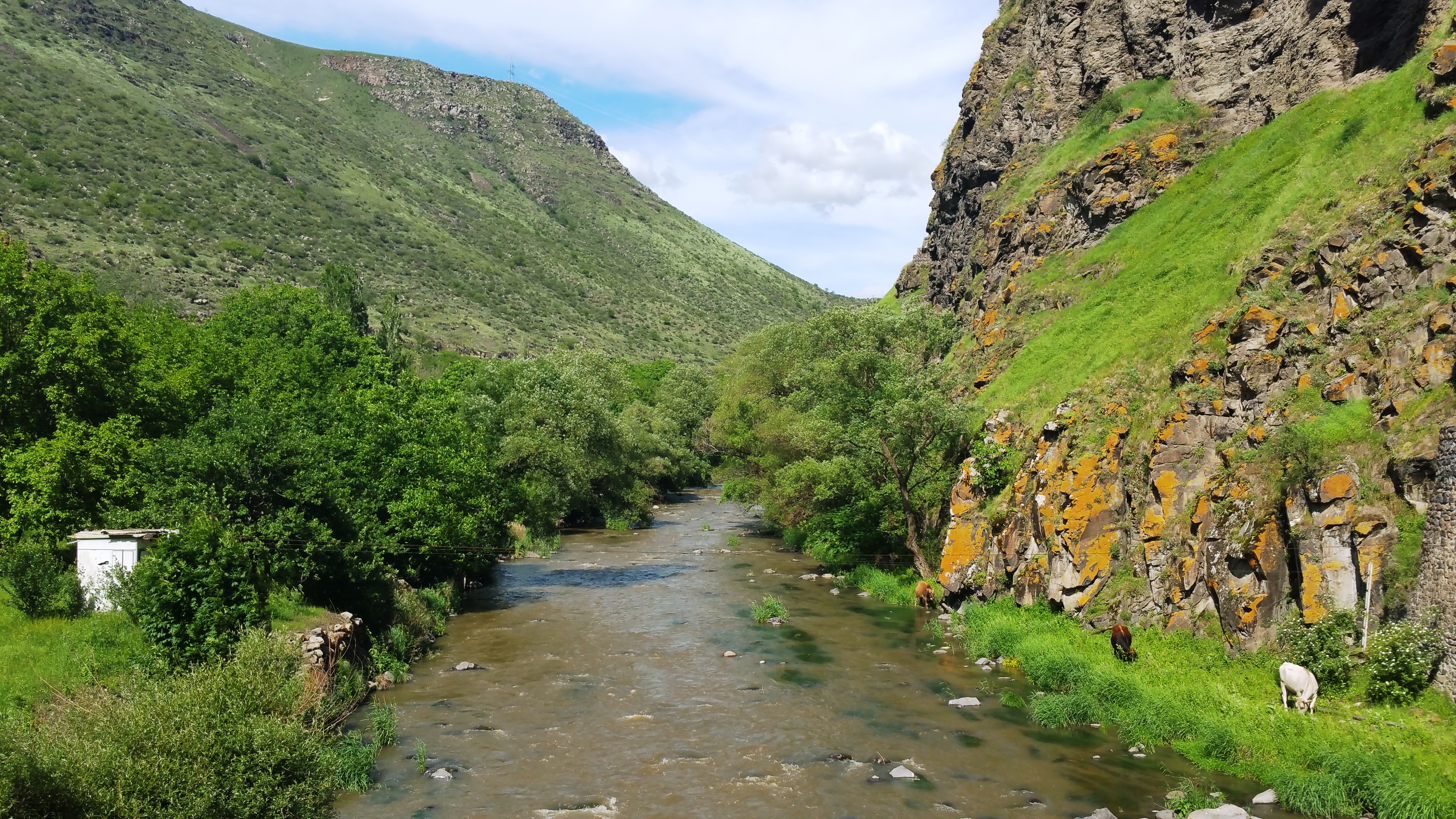
- The Paravani near Khertvisi
- Native name: ფარავანი (Georgian)

Location
- Country: Georgia

Physical characteristics
- Source: Paravani Lake
  - coordinates: 41.3985°N 43.7870°E
- Mouth: Kura (Mtkvari)
  - coordinates: 41.4712°N 43.2837°E
- Length: 74 km (46 mi)
- Basin size: 2,350 km^{2} (910 sq mi)

Basin features
- Progression: Kura→ Caspian Sea

The Paravani (Georgian: ფარავანი) is a river of southern Georgia. It is 74 km (46 mi) long, and has a drainage basin of 2,350 km^{2} (910 sq mi). The Paravani is the outflow of Paravani Lake, beginning from the southern part of the lake at an altitude of 2074 meters above sea level. It is a right tributary of the Kura (Mtkvari), which it joins in the village Khertvisi.
