= Samtskhe–Javakheti =

Region (mkhare) of Georgia

Coordinates: 41°35′N 43°16′E

Samtskhe–Javakheti სამცხე-ჯავახეთი
- Mkhare (region)
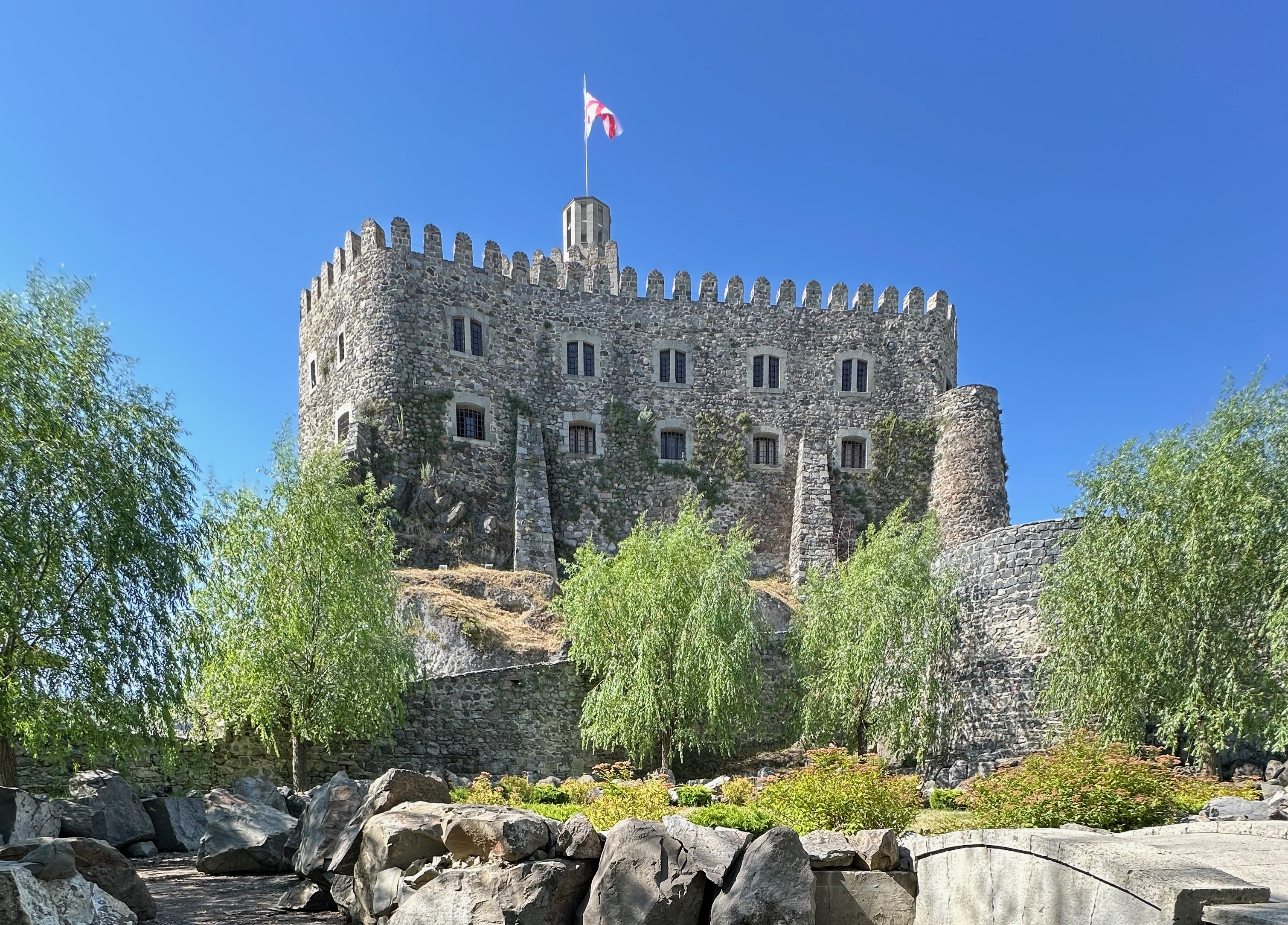
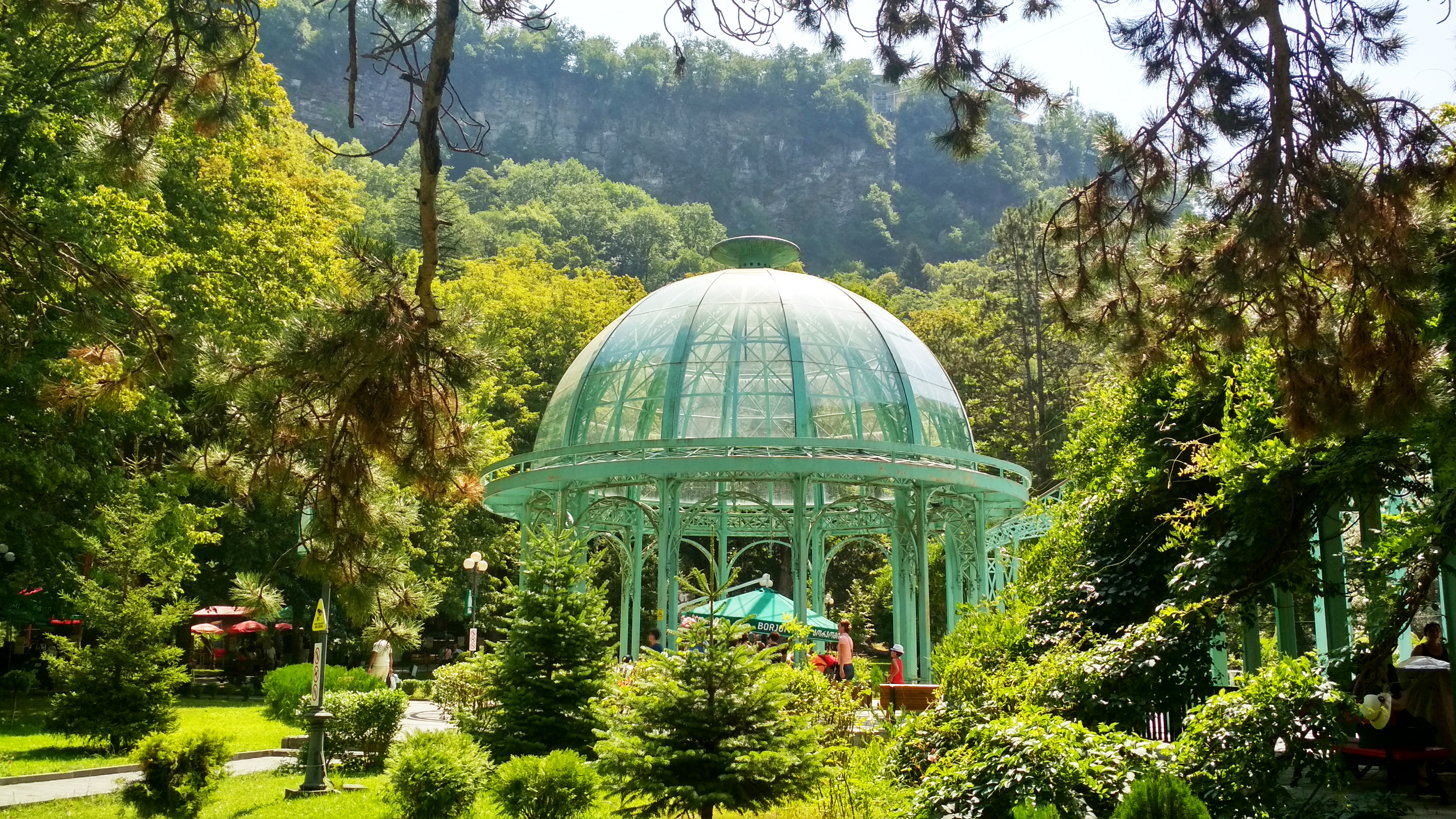
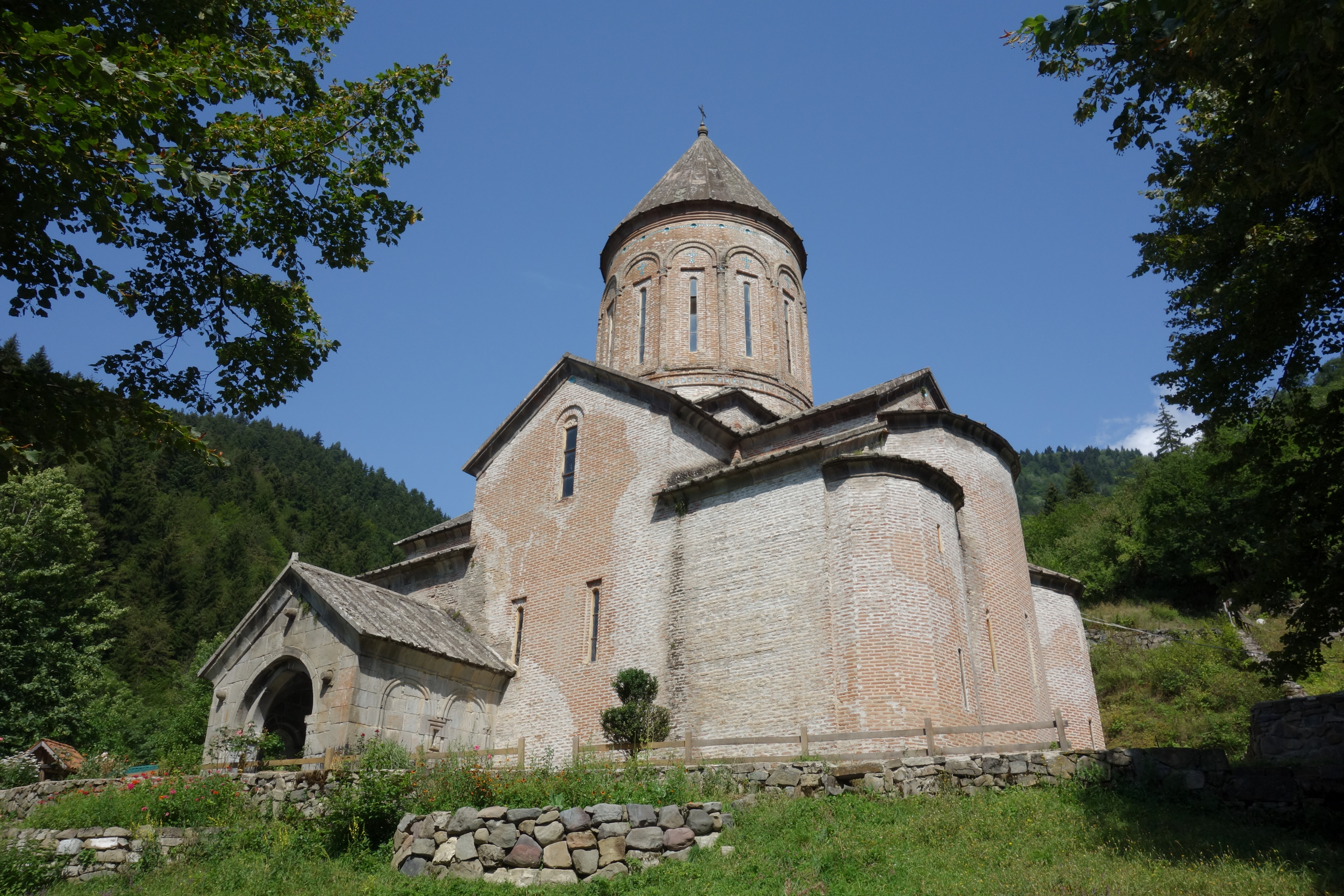
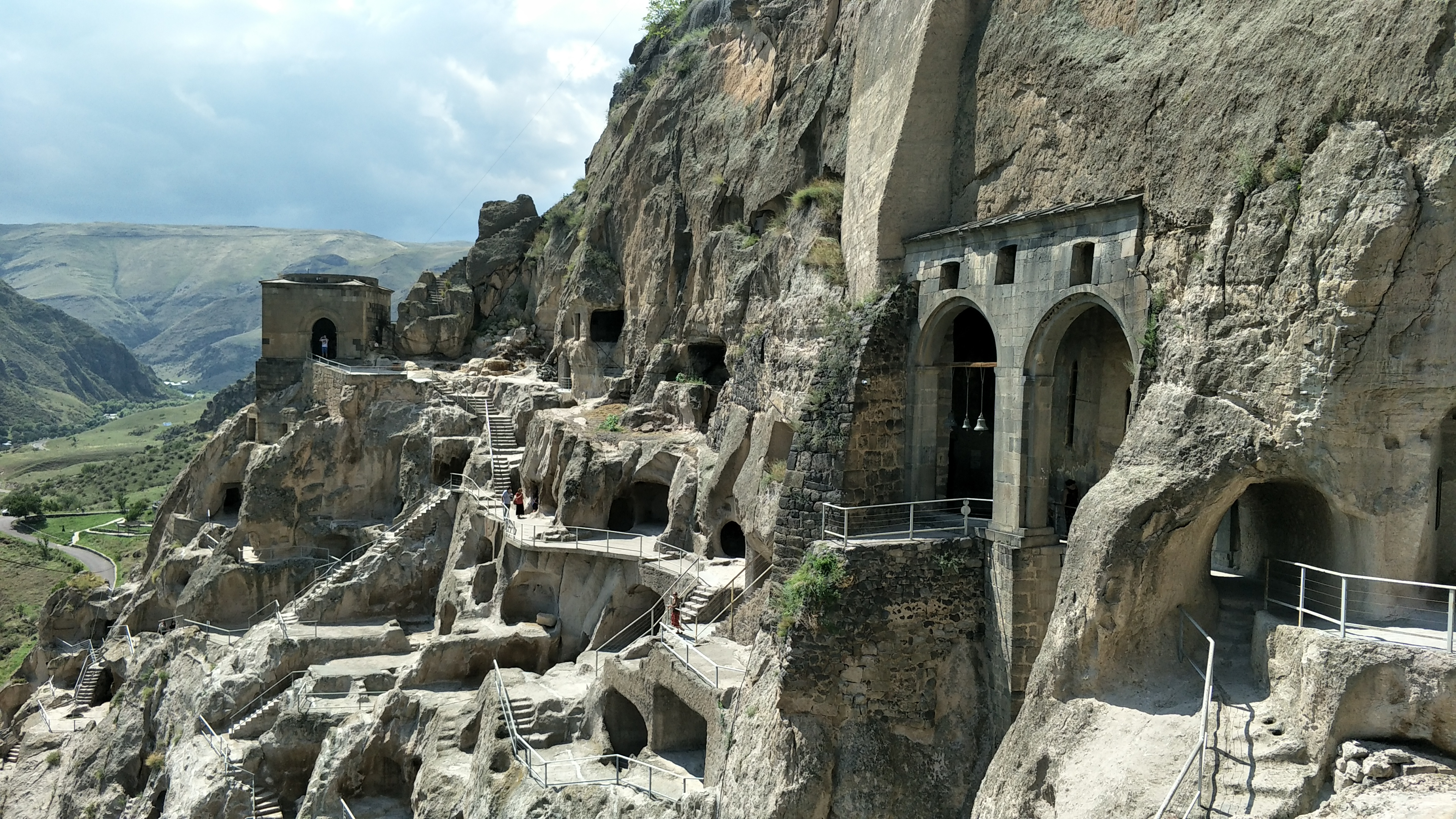
- From the top to bottom-right: Akhaltsikhe Castle, Borjomi Central Park, Kartsakhi Managed Reserve, Timotesubani Monastery, Vardzia

- Country: Georgia
- Seat: Akhaltsikhe
- Subdivisions: 6 municipalities

Government
  - Governor: Besik Amiranashvili

Area
  - Total: 6,413 km^{2} (2,476 sq mi)

Population (2021)
  - Total: 151,110
  - Density: 23.56/km^{2} (61.03/sq mi)

Gross Regional Product
  - Total: ₾ 1.82 billion (2022)
  - Per Capita: ₾ 12,329 (2022)
- ISO 3166 code: GE-SJ
- HDI (2023): 0.816 high · 7th

Samtskhe–Javakheti (Georgian: სამცხე-ჯავახეთი, [s̪ämt̪͡s̪ʰχe̞ d͡ʒäväχet̪ʰi], Armenian: Սամցխե-Ջավախեթի, romanized: Samts’khe-Javakhet’i) is a region (mkhare) in southern Georgia with a population of 147,400 (2023) and an area of 6,413 km^{2} (2,476 sq mi). The region has Akhaltsikhe as its administrative center. Samtskhe–Javakheti is made up of the historical Georgian provinces Meskheti, Javakheti and Tori.

The Baku-Tbilisi-Ceyhan oil pipeline, the South Caucasus natural gas pipeline, and the Kars–Tbilisi–Baku railway pass through the region.

The population of the region is made up of Georgians and Armenians, as well as smaller numbers of Russians.

== Geography ==
Relief map of Samtskhe–Javakheti region

Samtskhe–Javakheti borders Adjara and Guria in the northwestern tip, Imereti in the north, Shida Kartli in the northeast and Kvemo Kartli in the east. The southern border is formed by Armenia, the southwestern flank borders Turkey. The region covers the Javakheti Plateau, a highland of volcanic origin and the northern extension of the Armenian highlands. The plains are between 1500 and 2000 meters above sea level. Samtskhe–Javakheti is bordered by several mountain ranges, the most important being the Meskheti Range and Trialeti Range in the north and the Samsari Range and Javakheti Range in the east.

The highlands are home to some of Georgia's largest lakes, such as Paravani Lake, Tabatskuri Lake, Khanchali Lake and Kartsakhi Lake. Georgia's largest river, the Mtkvari, flows through the region from Turkey, a few miles north of Kartsakhi Lake. The river has carved a canyon through the highlands and forms the eastern boundary of the Erusheti Highlands, a mountain range along the border with Turkey. In this gorge the large historic cave monastery Vardzia is situated, an important tourist attraction. The river flows initially in a northwesterly direction through the gorge to Akhaltsikhe via Khertvisi Fortress where the Paravani River joins the Mtkvari. The river gorge has a depth of approximately 500 meters. At Akhaltsikhe the river turns to the northeast and streams to Borjomi between the Meskheti Range (left bank) and Trialeti Range (right bank), after which the river leaves the region through the Shida Kartli plain.

Due to its high location, the region has cold and snowy winters. Bakuriani, situated in the north not far from the spa town of Borjomi, is a popular ski resort.

== Subdivisions ==
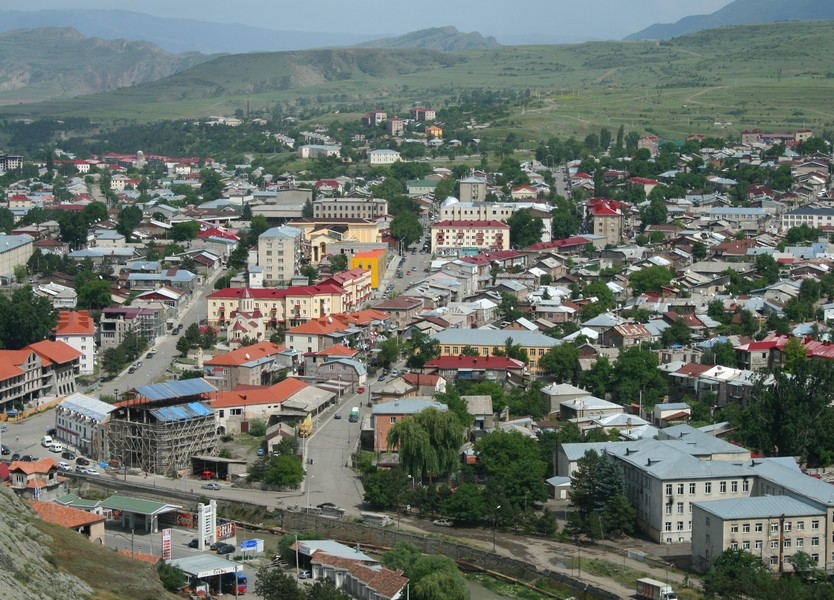
Akhaltsikhe, the administrative center of the region

2014 population density of the Samtskhe–Javakheti Municipalities

The region has six municipalities with 82 administrative communities (temi) and a total of 271 populated settlements:

- Five cities: Akhaltsikhe, Akhalkalaki, Borjomi, Vale and Ninotsminda
- Seven dabas: Bakuriani, Bakurianis Andeziti, Tsagveri, Akhaldaba, Adigeni, Abastumani and Aspindza
- Villages: 259

Map	Municipality	Area (km^{2})	Density (p/km^{2})
	Adigeni	799	20.1
	Akhalkalaki	1,235	33.2
	Akhaltsikhe	998	39.5
	Aspindza	825	12.8
	Borjomi	1,202	20.8
	Ninotsminda	1,354	14.0
Population density based on 2021 population. Municipality area

== Demographic ==
According to data from the National Statistical Bureau of Georgia, Samtskhe–Javakheti had 151,110 inhabitants as of January 1, 2021, a decrease of 6% compared to the 2014 census. Of these, 35.9% live in urban areas and 64.1% in rural villages. Akhaltsikhe and Akhalkalaki are the most densely populated municipalities.

Population development of the region Samtskhe–Javakheti
	1959	1970	1979	1989	2002*	2002**	2014	2021
Samtskhe–Javakheti	213,329	▲231,593	▼227,676	▲238,750	▼207,598	▼183,096	▼160,504	▼151,110
Akhalkalaki	62,977	▲69,992	▼68,234	▲69,256	▼60,975	-	▼45,070	▼41,026
Akhaltsikhe	50,420	▲51,907	▼49,836	▲54,747	▼46,134	-	▼38,895	▲39,463
Adigeni	19,593	▲20,272	▲20,278	▲21,284	▼20,752	-	▼16,462	▼16,092
Aspindza	11,265	▲12,494	▼12,264	▲13,262	▼13,010	-	▼10,372	▲10,587
Borjomi	37,010	▲39,661	▲40,796	▲41,266	▼32,422	-	▼25,214	▼24,998
Ninotsminda	32,064	▲37,267	▼36,268	▲38,935	▼34,305	-	▼24,491	▼18,944
* Research after 2014 census showed the 2002 census was inflated by 8-9 percent. ** Corrected data based on retro-projection 1994-2014 in collaboration with UN

=== Ethnic groups ===
In 1926, the Akhaltsikhe Uyezd (corresponding to Meskheti or Samtskhe) had a population of:

- Meskhetian Turks - 49,170 (50.7%)
- Georgians - 24,353 (25.1%)
- Armenians - 15,565 (16.1%)
- Kurds - 3,094 (3.2%)
- other ethnic groups - 4,591 (4.9%)

In 1926, the Akhalkalaki Uyezd (corresponding to Javakheti) had a population of:

- Armenians - 57,791 (73.2%)
- Georgians - 7,565 (9.6%)
- Meskhetian Turks - 6,940 (8.8%)
- Russians - 2,492 (3.2%)
- other ethnic groups - 4,149 (5.2%)

In 2002, Samtskhe–Javakheti province ethnic makeup of 207,598 total population:

- Armenians - 113,347
- Georgians - 89,995
- Abkhazians - 42
- Ossetians - 822
- Russians - 2,230
- Azerbaijanis - 59
- Greeks - 740
- Ukrainians - 162
- Kists -
- Yazidis - 1

In 2014, Samtskhe–Javakheti province of Georgia had the following ethnic makeup of 160,504 total population:

- Armenians - 81,089 (50.52%)
- Georgians - 77,498 (48.28%)
- Russians - 712 (0.44%)
- other ethnic groups - 1,194 (0.74%)

=== Population of the region before the 19th century ===
In the second half of the 16th century, the Turks conquered Samtskhe-Saatabago, where they established the Pashalik of Akhaltsikhe (or the Gurjistan Vilayet, i.e. the “Georgian Province”), which subsequently became an important outpost on the north-eastern frontiers of the Ottoman Empire. In the 16th century, the Ottomans conducted the first major population census of the region. This census did not include the entire population, but only tax-paying heads of households, whose surnames were generally not recorded. According to Sergi Jikia, this material is of great importance not only for the study of onomastics, but also for determining the ethnic composition of the population of the region at that time, which was entirely Georgian.

According to Andrew Peacock, literary evidence from the 18th century suggests that the ethnically Georgian rulers — descendants of the Georgian Jaqeli family, who had dominated the region since the 12th century — spoke Turkish, adopted Ottoman customs, and had long converted to Islam, while the majority of the population remained Christian and Georgian-speaking, having changed little in their way of life during 300 years of Ottoman rule.

In his work, the 18th-century geographer and historian Prince Vakhushti of Kartli described the population of Javakheti as follows:

“...The men and women resemble the Kartlian peasants: robust, handsome, uncultivated, and rough. In faith, the peasants are still all Christians, although they no longer have a bishop as shepherd, but they do have Georgian priests. Their language is Georgian, while the local leaders also know Tatar, as they need to communicate with the Turks.”

In the 1770s, the German traveller Johann Anton Güldenstedt, who visited Javakheti, noted that in Akhaltsikhe, Atskuri, Akhalkalaki, and other neighbouring places, “...there live Georgians who, although they still speak their own language, have, because of Turkish rule, abandoned the Christian religion and become Muslims”.

=== Population of the region in the 19th century ===
Emigration of Armenian refugees from the Ottoman Empire into Russian territory during the Russo-Turkish War (1877–1878)
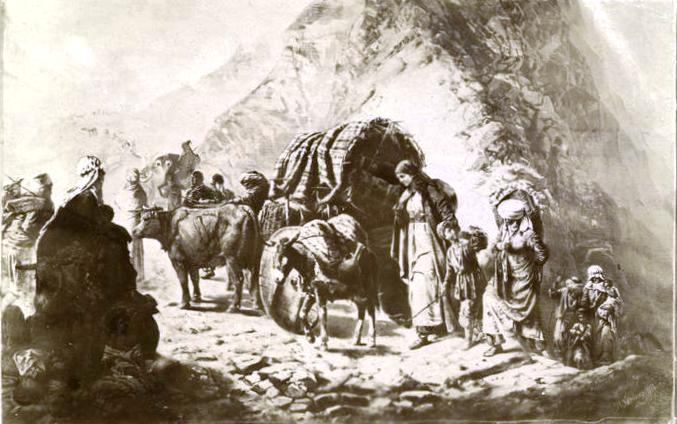

Armenian migration into the Russian Empire in the 19th and 20th centuries. According to Arthur Tsutsiev’s Atlas of the Ethno-Political History of the Caucasus (2015).

Following the end of the Russo-Turkish War (1828–1829), the Russian Empire expanded its borders into “Turkish Georgia” (the Pashalik of Akhaltsikhe). At the time of the annexation of the region by the Russian Empire, its population consisted largely of “Islamized” Georgians.

Between 1829 and 1877, a significant migration of Muslims into Ottoman territory and of Armenians into Russian territory took place. The indigenous Georgian population of the region was forced to resettle in Turkey. Thousands of Armenians from the Ottoman Empire, particularly from Erzurum, settled in the abandoned villages of Akhalkalaki (Javakheti). encouraged to migrate by the Russian authorities. As a result, Armenians came to constitute the majority of the population of Javakheti, a process also facilitated by restrictions that prohibited Georgians from settling in certain areas of southern Georgia.

According to The Oxford Handbook of Languages of the Caucasus, the Armenians of Samtskhe-Javakheti are descendants of those Armenians who resettled there in the 19th century during the Russo-Turkish wars. They rarely speak Georgian and instead use the Karin dialect of the Armenian language.

== History ==
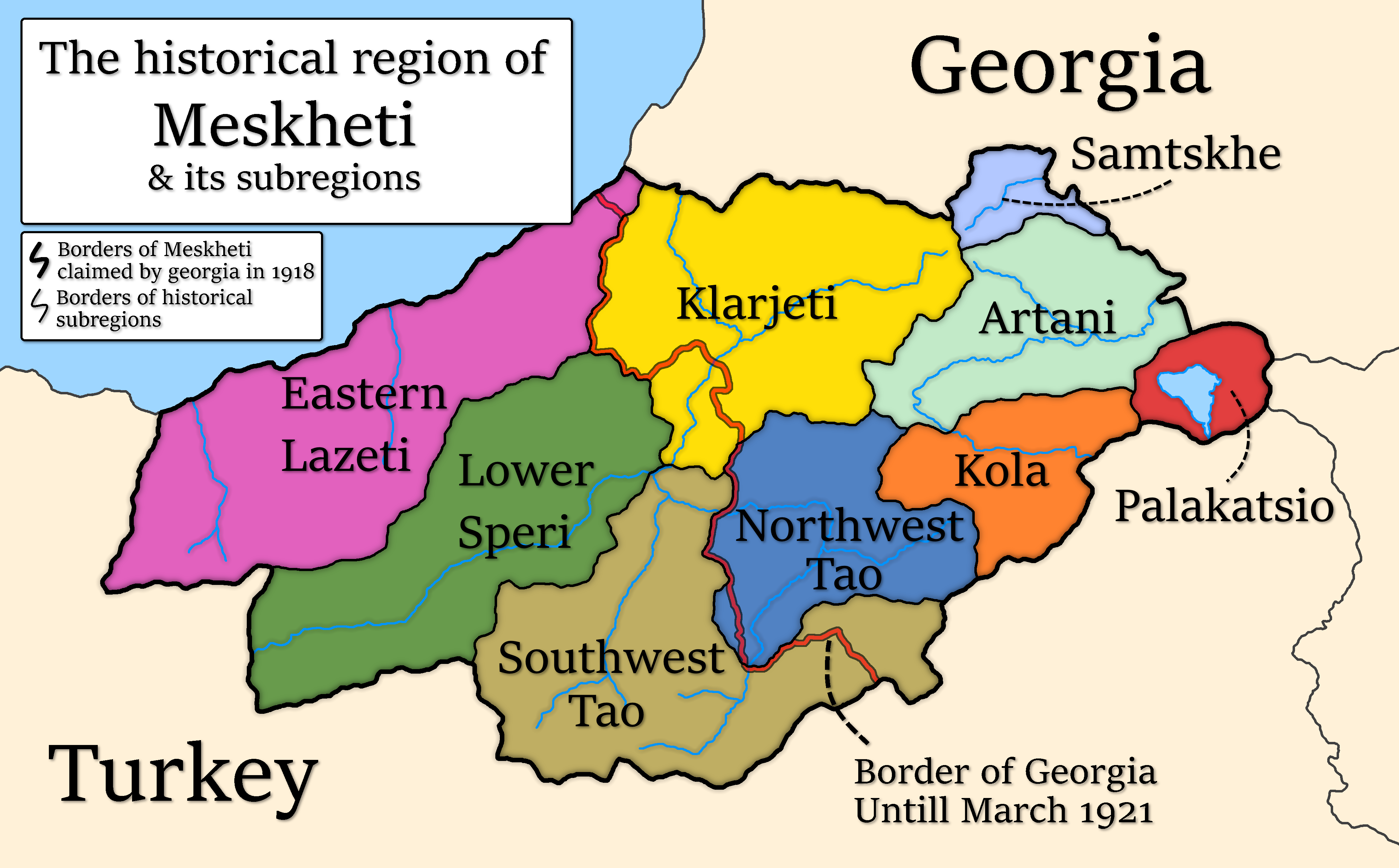
Part of historical Samtskhe (light blue) in modern Turkey.

The current division of Georgia into "regions" (Mkhare) was introduced by the Shevardnadze government in the mid-1990s, partly as a response to the secession of Abkhazia and the South Ossetia conflict. Samtskhe–Javakheti was basically formed by combining the two traditional provinces of Meskheti (Samtskhe) and Javakheti.

=== Soviet era ===
Georgia came fully under Soviet control in 1921, after the Red Army invasion of Georgia. The remaining Muslim minority in Meskheti, also known as "Meskhetian Turks", were deported in cattle-trucks to Central Asia by order of Stalin and settled within an area that overlaps the boundaries of the modern nations of Kazakhstan, Kyrgyzstan, and Uzbekistan. Today, many are still dispersed across those countries. Of the 100,000 forcibly deported, as many as 30,000-50,000 perished.

== Tourist attractions ==
The major tourist attractions are the cave monasteries of Vardzia (which was founded by Queen Tamar in 1185), Vanis Kvabebi (which dates from the 8th century), Rabati Castle and Khertvisi Fortress. Also, among national visitors is very popular 10th century Sapara Monastery, Tmogvi fortress, and 8th century Zarzma monastery.

== See also ==
- Subdivisions of Georgia
