= Zeda =

Zeda may refer to:

== Companies ==
- Zeda Computers International Limited, a defunct American computer company

== Places ==
=== Georgia ===
- Zeda Vardzia, an 11th-century Georgian Orthodox church located in the Aspindza Municipality in Samtskhe-Javakheti
- Zeda Tmogvi, a medieval Christian church in south Georgia
- Zeda Sakara, a community in the west of Georgia, about 40 km to the southeast of Kutaisi
- Zeda Uchkhubi, a village in the Ozurgeti Municipality of Guria in western Georgia
- Zeda Bakhvi, a village in the Ozurgeti Municipality of Guria in western Georgia
- Zeda Dzimiti, a village in the Ozurgeti Municipality of Guria in western Georgia

=== Italy ===
- Monte Zeda, a mountain in the Lepontine Alps belonging to the province of Verbano-Cusio-Ossola

== People ==
- Zeda Zhang, an American professional wrestler and former mixed martial artist
- Zeda Rosenberg, an American microbiologist and epidemiologist
