= Khvilisha Church =

Church in Aspindza, Georgia

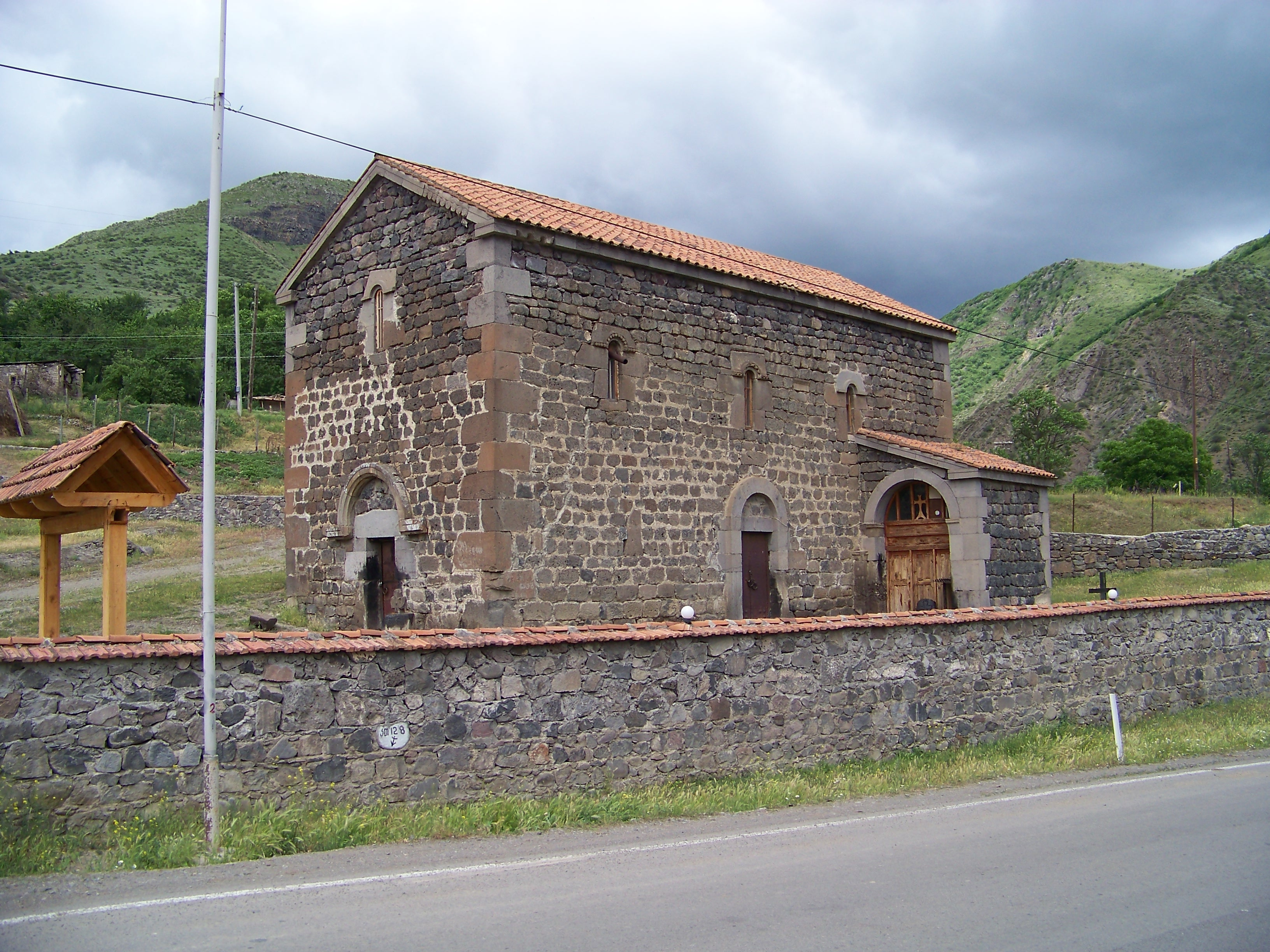
- Khvilisha Church

- Location within Georgia

Religion
- Affiliation: Georgian Orthodox Church
- Province: Samtskhe-Javakheti
- Region: Caucasus

Location
- Location: Aspindza, Aspindza Municipality, Samtskhe-Javakheti Province (Mkhare), Georgia
- Municipality: Aspindza
- Coordinates: 41.565008°N 43.26222°E

Architecture
- Type: Church
- Style: Georgian; Basilica
- Completed: 8th or, more likely, 9th century, rebuilt 1970s

Specifications
- Dome: 0
- Materials: Rough & hewn basalt blocks

Khvilisha Church is an 8th- or, more likely, 9th-century Georgian Orthodox church located along the southern outskirts and side of the main road through the village of Aspindza in the Aspindza Municipality and Samtskhe-Javakheti province of Georgia. The church was renovated in the 1970s, where collapsed portions of upper walls and a missing vault were reconstructed.
