= Zeda Tmogvi =

Monument in Javakheti, Georgia

- ზედა თმოგვი
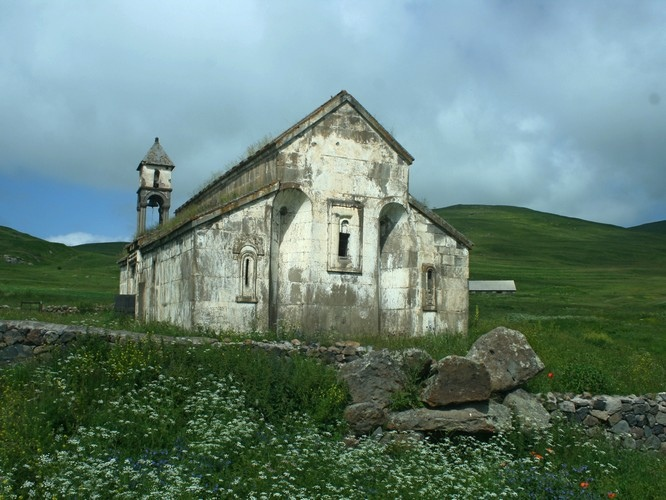
- Zeda Tmogvi church
- Interactive map of Zeda Tmogvi
- Location: Aspindza Municipality, Samtskhe-Javakheti, Georgia
- Coordinates: 41.403470°N 43.287902°E
- Type: Three-nave basilica

Zeda Tmogvi (Georgian: ზედა თმოგვი) is a medieval Christian church in south Georgia, in the historical province of Javakheti (now part of Aspindza Municipality). The extant building is a three-nave basilica, built in the reign of Bagrat IV of Georgia (1027–1072) on the place of an earlier church. Its façades contain several contemporaneous Georgian inscriptions, which make mention of historical persons of that time. The church is inscribed on the list of the Immovable Cultural Monuments of National Significance of Georgia.

== Location ==
Zeda Tmogvi, that is, "upper Tmogvi", is located on a high mountain plateau between the Tmogvi fortress and Vardzia cave complex, some 3 km north of the latter. The Zeda Tmogvi church stands in the middle of a settlement, which was left to ruin and decay after the deportation of local Muslim villagers by the Soviet Union in 1944. The locale has not been archaeologically studied. Occasional finds include fragments of the Bronze Age black-polished pottery and obsidian flakes. There are also a series of underground stone chambers nearby. The toponym Zeda Tmogvi itself is first mentioned in an Ottoman fiscal document dated to 1595 and an 18th-century Georgian chronicle relating the 1576 events in Samtskhe.

== Layout ==
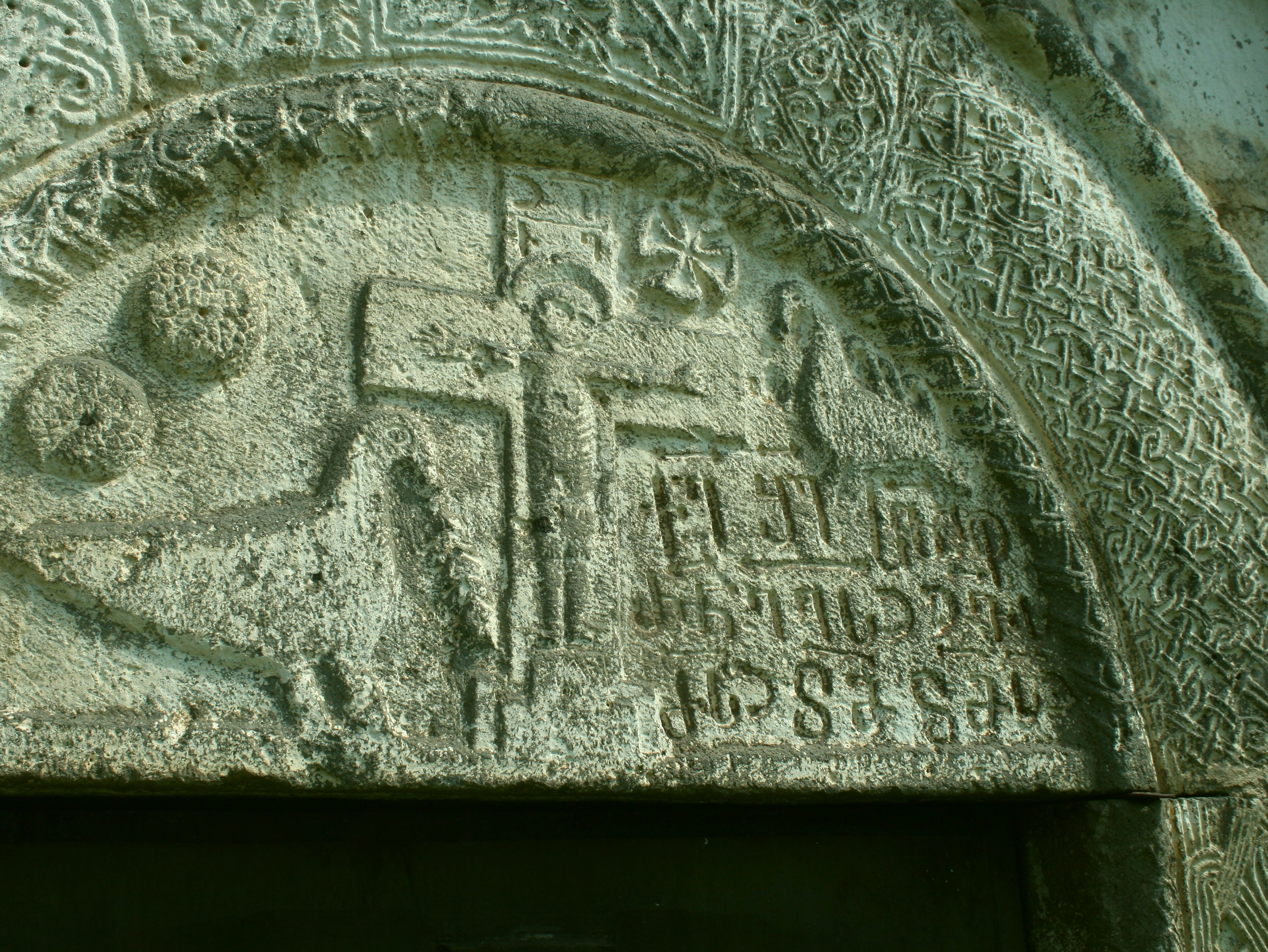
Zeda Tmogvi. Ornamentation and an inscription on the south façade.

Zeda Tmogvi was constructed in the latter quarter of the 11th century, but seems to have been remodeled since then. It is a three-nave basilica built of neatly hewn grey basalt blocks and roofed with stone slabs. The central nave is taller and larger than the side naves, from which it is separated, on either side, by a tripartite arcade supported on a pair of columns. The north wall incorporates an older structure—the south wall of a small 8th–9th-century hall church with an entrance doorway. The south façade has a portal, set within a rectangular frame and adorned with decorative stonework and inscriptions. Two arcuated niches are recessed and three windows with ornamented frames are cut into the east façade.

The church contains at least nine inscriptions, executed in the medieval Georgian asomtavruli script. One of these, placed at the south portal, exalts King Bagrat and his mother, Mariam. Two other inscriptions commemorate Parsman, eristavt-eristavi, a prominent nobleman in Bagrat's reign, and George "the Abkhaz", probably Bagrat's son George II.
