= Surameli =

The Surameli (Georgian: სურამელი; pl. სურამელები, suramelebi) were a noble family in the medieval Kingdom of Georgia, with notable members from the 12th century to the 14th. At the height of their influence and prestige in the 13th century, the Surameli were hereditary eristavi ("duke") of Kartli and msakhurt-ukhutsesi ("Lord High Chamberlain") of Georgia.

== Origin ==
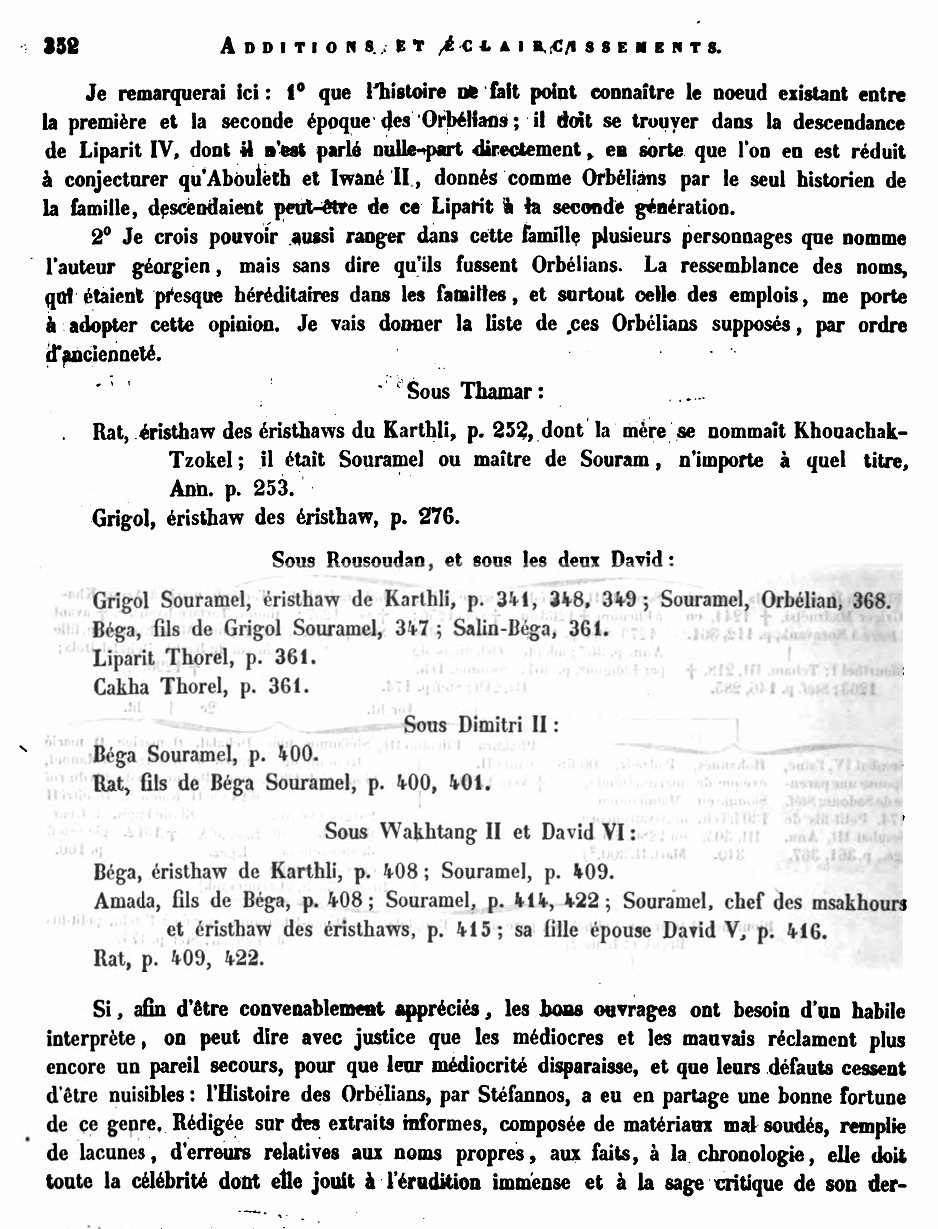
Genealogy of the Orbeli and Surameli families (1851) according to Marie-Félicité Brosset.

The origin of the Surameli family has not been fully elucidated. Their surname derives from a territorial epithet, meaning "of/from Surami", a castle in the central Georgian province of Shida Kartli. Based on similarities in personal names and titles, the 19th-century French Orientalist Marie-Félicité Brosset identified the Surameli of the Georgian annals as possible members of the house of Orbeli. This hypothesis has been accepted by Cyril Toumanoff, who considers the "Orbelianis of Surami" as the cousins of those Orbeli who, exiled by George III of Georgia in 1177, later established themselves as the princely dynasty of Siunia.

An alternative view, more popular in Georgia and first advanced by Tedo Zhordania in the 1890s, links the Surameli to the family of Pavneli, which first appears in records in a deed given to the Mghvime monastery. The document, traditionally dated to the 9th or 10th century, has recently been redated to 1121.

== History ==
The first known Surameli is Bega or Beka, a companion of the Georgian king George III in his campaign against the Shaddadids of Ani in 1161. Bega's descendants appear, first with his son Rati I, as the hereditary eristavi of Kartli, succeeding to that office on the downfall of the Orbeli clan in 1177. Under King David VII of Georgia, c. 1250, Rati's grandson, Grigol, acceded to the dignity of the chief royal chamberlain, which also became hereditary in the family for nearly a century.

At their heyday, the Surameli married into other important families of Georgia, such as the Toreli and Dadiani, and a daughter of Hamada Surameli became a queen consort of Georgia as the second wife of King David VIII c. 1302. Hamada is the last known Surameli to have been in possession of his family's hereditary offices. With him, the house of Surameli virtually disappears from the records. There is only a bypassing reference to a certain Surameli, eristavi of the mountaineers of the Aragvi valley under George VII c. 1405.

== Notable members ==
=== Bega I ===
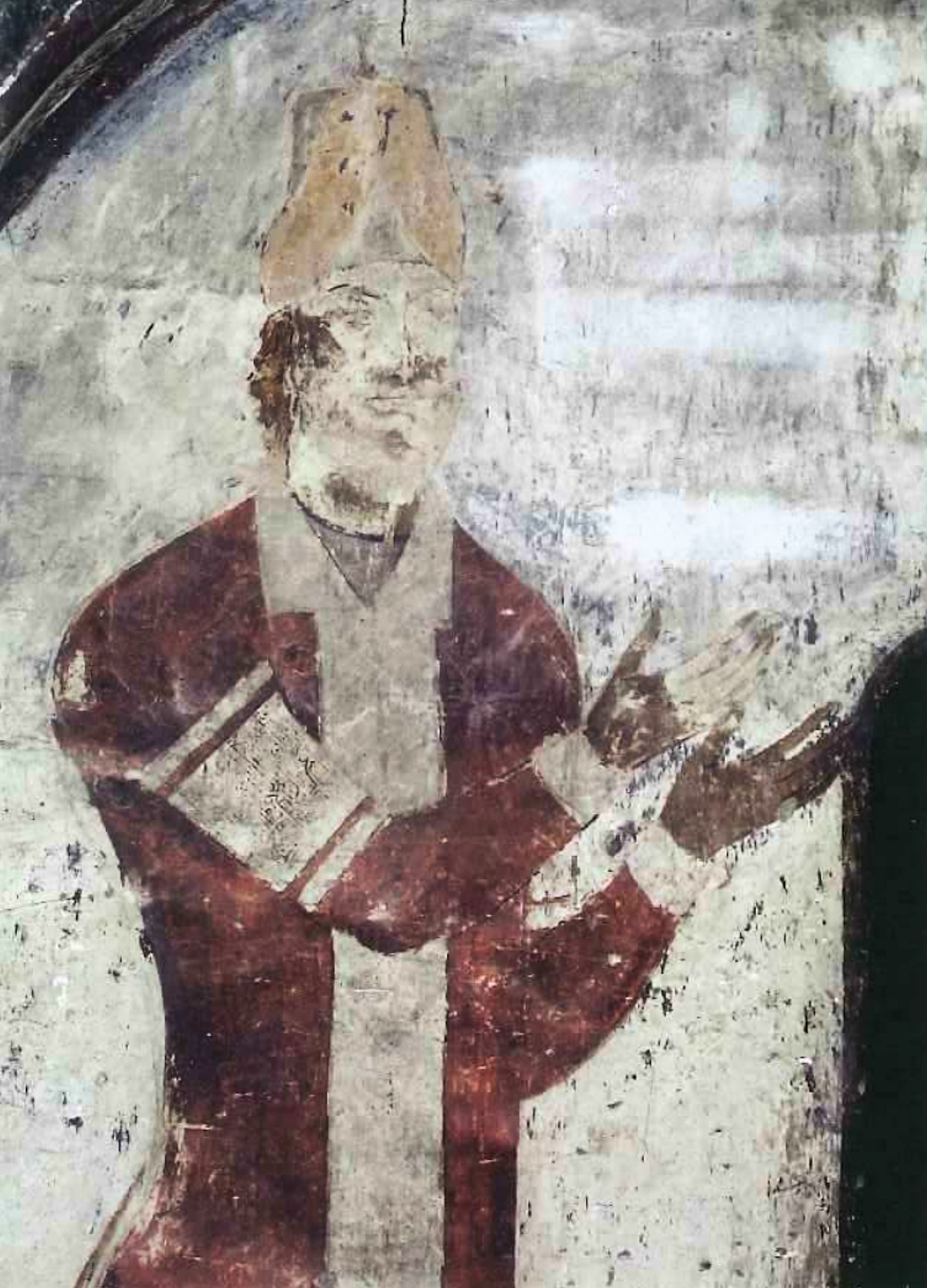
Rati Surameli, Duke of Javakheti and Kartli.

Bega I Surameli (ბეგა სურამელი; also known as Beka or Beshken) was the first known member of the family, serving under George III during the victorious expedition against the Shaddadid dynasty of Ani in 1161. His service was rewarded by the king with the village of Suelneti in Kartli, which his grandson Sula later donated to the Kvatakhevi monastery. Bega's wife Khuashak Tsokali was one of the two female dignitaries who negotiated on behalf of George III's successor, Tamar, a peace deal with the rebellious political faction led by Qutlu Arslan c. 1184.

=== Rati I ===
Rati I Surameli (რატი სურამელი), the son of Bega, was the first of the family to have attained to the title of eristavi of Kartli, apparently after Liparit Orbeli was dispossessed of the rank following the rebellion against George III in 1177. He is first mentioned in a document dated to 1170. Rati is known as a benefactor to the monasteries of Mghvime and Vardzia. The church of Dormition in Vardzia was frescoed on Rati's commission and features his fresco depiction alongside those of his royal suzerains, George III and Tamar. Rati was succeeded as the eristavi of Kartli by his son, Sula (სულა).

=== Grigol ===
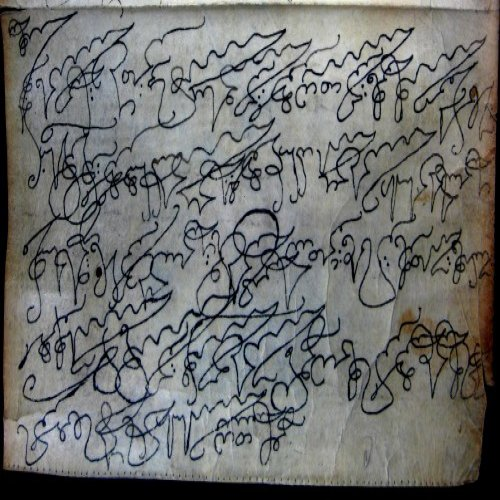
A charter of Surameli to the Shio-Mgvime monastery from the 13th century.

Grigol Surameli (გრიგოლ სურამელი; died c. 1260), the son and successor of Sula, was prominent in the politics of Georgia during the advent of the Mongol hegemony. He championed the candidacy of David VII Ulu to the throne of Georgia during the interregnum of 1245–1247 and succeeded to the royal chamberlainship of Georgia on the death of Vahram of Gagi, a nobleman of the Mkhargrdzeli family, c. 1250. He was among the Georgian auxiliaries during the Mongol siege of the Assassin stronghold of Alamut in Iran in 1256 and remained loyal to the Mongols even when David VII took up arms against them in 1259. Grigol had a son, Bega II, who succeeded to his titles, and a daughter, Khatuta, who married the chief royal treasurer Kakha Toreli.

=== Bega II ===
Bega II Surameli (ბეგა სურამელი; born c. 1225), son of Grigol, was a close associate of David VI Narin and accompanied him in his travel to the court of the Great Khan to obtain recognition as king of Georgia in 1242. He was active in the politics of Georgia during the diarchy of David VI and David VII from 1247 to 1259 and joined David VI in a revolt from the Mongol overlordship in 1259. On his father's death, Bega defected from David VI, reconciled with the Mongols, and was made by David VII the successor to the titles of his father. According to the Georgian chronicles, the Mongols called him Salin-Beg, that is, "the Good Bega". He was succeeded by his elder son, Hamada. Bega's another son, Rati II, was a companion of Demetrius II of Georgia in the Mongol campaigns. Bega also had the third son, Mikel, and a daughter, Khuashak, who married the influential nobleman Bedan Dadiani.

=== Hamada ===
Hamada Surameli (ჰამადა სურამელი), a son and successor of Bega II, was a loyal courtier and commander of the king David VIII of Georgia. During the 1290s, he led the struggle against the Alan incursions in Kartli and laid siege to the Alan-occupied Gori, which he was compelled to relieve after the Mongol intervention. Hamada stood by the side of David VIII during the king's rebellion against the Mongols. His daughter, whose name is not recorded in the sources, married David as the second wife, becoming the mother of the short-lived king George VI.

=== Family tree ===
Family tree

Bega I	Khuashak Tsokali
Rati I
Sula
Grigol	Ivane
Bega II	Khatuta	Kakha Toreli
Hamada	Rati II	Mikel	Kakana	Khuashak	Bedan Dadiani
N. daughter	David VIII, King of Georgia
