= Vanis Kvabebi =

Cave monastery in Georgia

Coordinates: 41°22′54″N 43°18′23″E

- ვანის ქვაბები
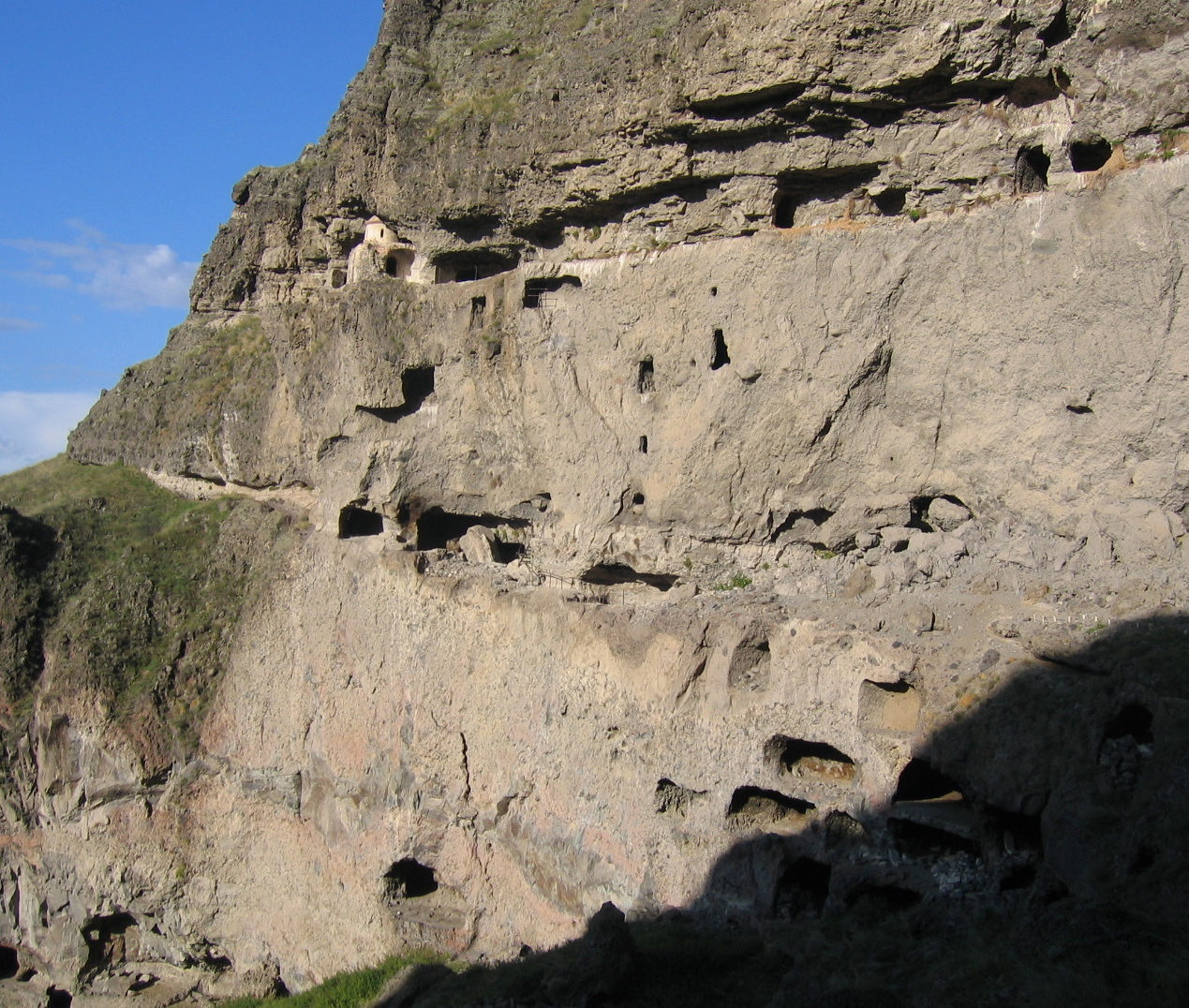
- Vanis Kvabebi seen from the second level of tunnels
- Interactive map of Vanis Kvabebi

Monastery information
- Other name: Vani's Caves
- Established: 8th century

Vanis Kvabebi (Georgian: ვანის ქვაბები; English: Vani's Caves) is a cave monastery in Samtskhe-Javakheti region of Georgia near Aspindza town and the more famous cave city of Vardzia. The complex dates from 8th century and consists of a defensive wall built in 1204 and a maze of tunnels running on several levels in the side of the mountain.

There are also two churches in the complex. A newer stone church that is in quite good shape stands near the top of the wall, and a smaller, domed church that clings to the rock on the level of the highest tunnels

The complex has undergone a USAID programme to update its infrastructure.

== See also ==
- Culture of Georgia
- Vardzia cave city
