= Deportation of the Meskhetian Turks =

1944 ethnic cleansing of the Meskhetian Turks in the Soviet Union

- Part of Population transfer and Political repression in the Soviet Union, and World War II
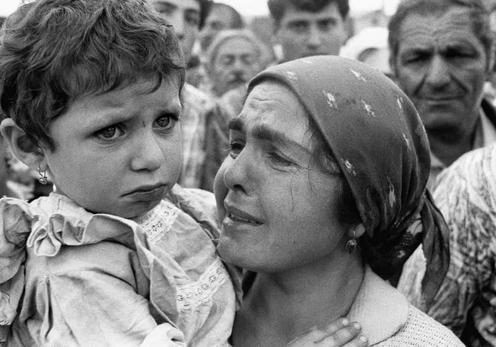
- A deported Meskhetian Turk woman and her child in exile in Uzbek SSR
- Location: Meskheti, Georgian SSR
- Date: 14–15 November 1944
- Target: Primarily Meskhetian Turks, with some Kurds, Hemshils, and Azeris
- Attack type: Forced transfer, deportation, ethnic cleansing
- Deaths: Various estimates: 1) 12,589; 2) 14,895; 3) 30,000; 4) 50,000
- Victims: 115,000 Meskhetian Turks, Kurds, and Hemshins deported to special settlements in the Soviet Union
- Perpetrator: USSR: NKVD
- Motive: Russification, colonialism, Turkophobia

The entire Meskhetian Turk population from the Meskheti region of the Georgian Soviet Socialist Republic (now Georgia) was forcibly transferred by the Soviet government to Central Asia on 14 November 1944. During the deportation, between 92,307 and 94,955 Meskhetian Turks were forcibly removed from 212 villages. They were packed into cattle wagons and mostly sent to the Uzbek Soviet Socialist Republic. Members of other ethnic groups were also deported during the operation, including Hemshins, bringing the total to approximately 115,000 evicted people. They were placed in special settlements where they were assigned to forced labor. The deportation and harsh conditions in exile caused between 12,589 and 50,000 deaths.

The expulsion was executed by NKVD chief Lavrentiy Beria on the orders of Soviet Premier Joseph Stalin and involved 4,000 NKVD personnel. 34 million roubles were allocated to carry out the operation. It was a part of the Soviet forced settlement program and population transfers that affected several million members of Soviet ethnic minorities between the 1930s and the 1950s. Around 32,000 people, mostly Armenians, were settled by the Soviet government in the areas cleared of Meskhetia.

After Stalin's death, the new Soviet leader Nikita Khrushchev delivered a secret speech in 1956 in which he condemned and reversed Stalin's deportations of various ethnic groups, many of which were allowed to their places of origin. However, even though they were released from the special settlements, the Meskhetian Turks, along with the Crimean Tatars and Volga Germans, were forbidden from returning to their native lands, making their exile permanent. Due to the secrecy of their expulsion and the politics of the Soviet Union, the deportation of the Meskhetian Turks remained relatively unknown and was subject to very little scholarly research until they were targeted by violent riots in Uzbekistan in 1989. Modern historians categorized the crime as ethnic cleansing and a crime against humanity. In 1991, the newly independent Georgia refused to give Meskhetian Turks the right to return to the Meskheti region. The Meskhetian Turks numbered between 260,000 and 335,000 people in 2006, and are today scattered across seven countries of the former Soviet Union, where many are stateless.

== Background ==
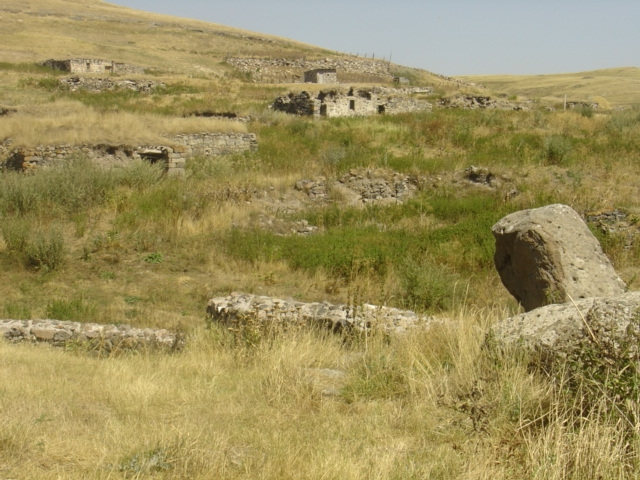
Ruins of an old Meskhetian settlement at Zeda Tmogvi in south Georgia.

The Meskhetian Turks, also known as Akhiska Turks, originally lived in the Meskheti region in the south of present-day Georgia. There is no consensus among historians regarding their origin. Either they are ethnic Turks or Turkicized Georgians who converted to Islam during the Ottoman rule of the region.

The Ottoman army conquered the Meskheti region, then part of the Principality of Samtskhe, during the Turkish military expedition of 1578. Turkish historians are of the view that the Turkic tribes had settled in the region as early as the eleventh and twelfth centuries when Georgian king David IV invited the Kipchaks Turkic tribes to defend his border regions from the Seljuk Turks. The area became part of the Russian Empire in 1829 following the Russo-Turkish War.

In 1918, near the end of World War I and at the beginning of the Russian Civil War, Georgia proclaimed independence, while some Muslim communities in Meskheti proclaimed a semi-autonomous confederation and prepared for a unification with the dissolving Ottoman Empire. Ottoman troops moved into this area and numerous clashes broke out between the Christian and Muslim populations of the region. In 1921 Soviet forces took control of Georgia and signed the Treaty of Kars which divided Meskheti between Turkey and the newly Soviet Georgia. In the 1920s, Joseph Stalin emerged as the new General Secretary of the Communist Party of the Soviet Union. Ben Kiernan, an American academic and historian, described Stalin's era as "by far the bloodiest of Soviet or even Russian history".

Between 1928 and 1937, the Meskhetian Turks were pressured by the Soviet authorities to adopt Georgian names. The 1926 Soviet census listed 137,921 Turks in the Georgian Soviet Socialist Republic, but this figure included Azerbaijanis. In the 1939 Soviet census, most Meskhetian Turks were classified as Azerbaijanis.

== Deportation ==
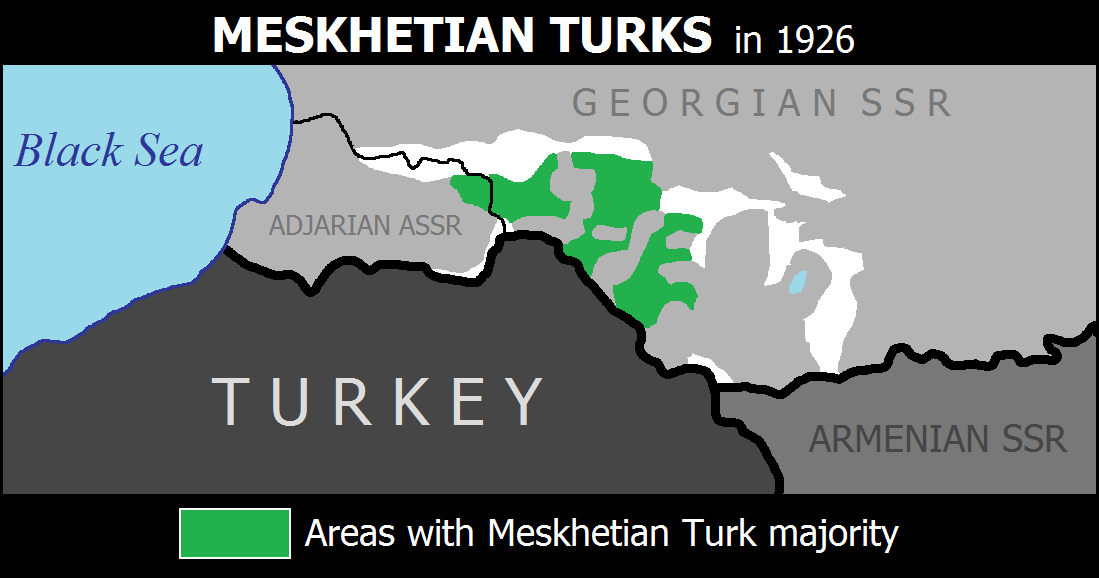
Distribution of Meskhetian Turks within the Georgian SSR, 1926.

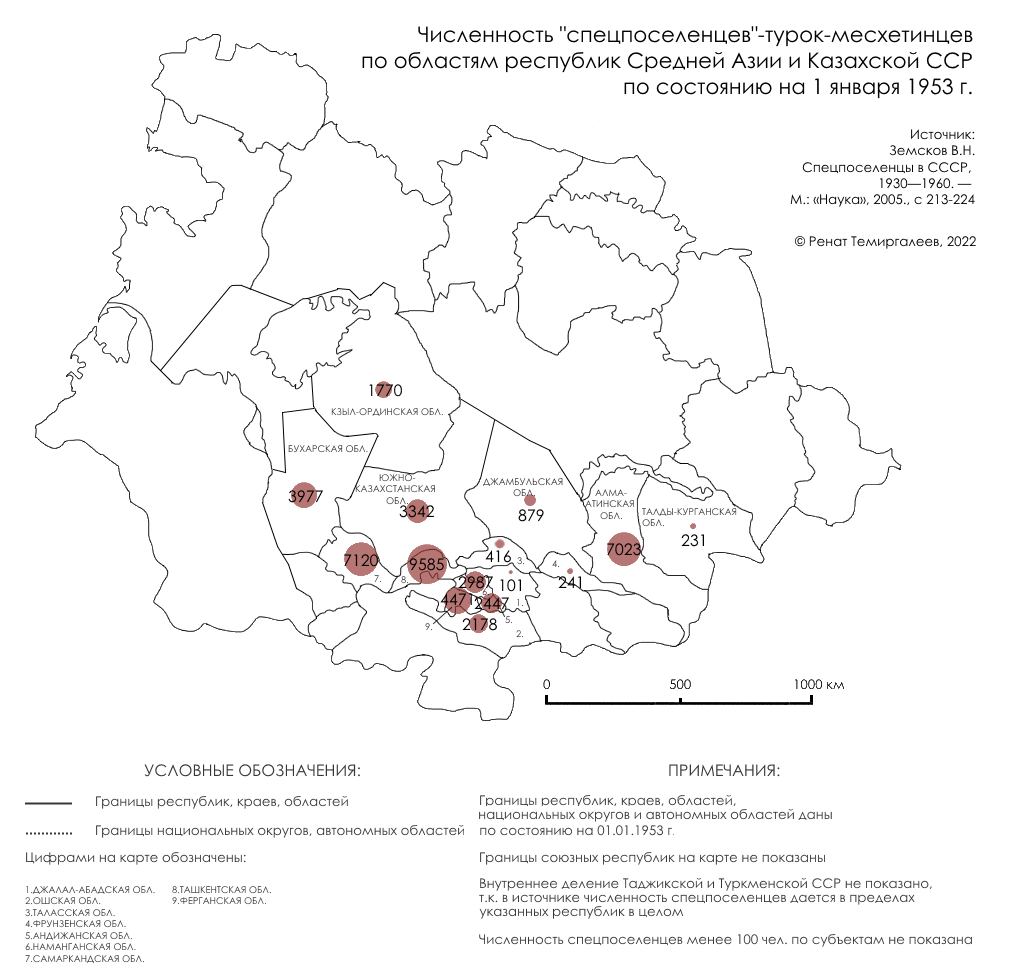
Distribution of resettled Meskhetian Turks within the Soviet Central Asia, 1 January 1953.

On 31 July 1944, the Soviet State Defense Committee decree N 6277ss stated: "... in order to defend Georgia's state border and the state border of the USSR we are preparing to relocate Turks, Kurds and Hemshils from the border strip". On 23 September 1944, the People's Commissar for Internal Affairs of the Kazakh SSR informed the NKVD that it was ready to accept new settlers: Turks, Kurds, Hemshils; 5,350 families to kolkhozes and 750 families to sovkhozes. The Uzbek SSR said that it was ready to accept 50,000 people (instead of the planned 30,000). 239 railcars were prepared to transport the deportees and people were mobilized.

The Meskhetian Turks were one of the six ethnic groups from the Caucasus who were deported in 1943 and 1944 in their entirety by the Soviet secret police—the other five were the Chechens, the Ingush, the Balkars, the Karachays and the Kalmyks. Their deportation was relatively poorly documented. Historians date the expulsion of the Meskhetian Turks to Soviet Central Asia either to 14 or 15 November 1944. The operation was completed by 26 November. At the start of the operation, the Soviet soldiers arrived as early as 4:00 a.m. at the homes of the Meskhetian Turks and did not tell them where they were being taken to. The population was not given advance notice; the NKVD notification stated: "You are to be deported. Get ready. Take foodstuffs for three days. Two hours for preparation." Studebaker trucks were used to drive the Meskhetian Turks to the nearby railway stations. In the deportation, between 92,307 and 94,955 Meskhetian Turks, distributed in 16,700 families, were forcibly resettled from 212 villages. They were packed into cattle wagons and deported eastwards to Central Asia. By 4:00 p.m. on 17 November, 81,234 people had been dispatched.

The journey was really horrible. I was only four or five years old and I don’t remember much but it was cold, and there were bodies being thrown from the train all the time... We weren’t allowed a full education in Uzbekistan. We were segregated, oppressed.

— Efratun Tifur, 2016

Official Soviet records indicate that 92,307 persons were deported, of whom 18,923 were men, 27,309 were women and 45,989 were children under the age of 16. 52,163 were resettled in the Uzbek SSR, 25,598 in the Kazakh SSR and 10,546 in the Kyrgiz SSR. 84,556 people were employed in kolkhozes, 6,316 in sovkhozes and 1,395 in industrial enterprises. The last of the deported people arrived at Tashkent by 31 January 1945.

Deported Meskhetian Turks were allowed to carry up to 1,000 kilograms (2,200 lb) of personal belongings with them per family, twice the amount as Crimean Tatars during their previous deportation. Members of other minority ethnic groups were also deported with the Meskhetian Turks, including Kurds and Hemshils (Armenian Muslims), giving a total of approximately 115,000 evicted persons. One source indicates that 8,694 Kurds and 1,385 Hemshils were deported as part of the operation. Only women married to men of other, non-deported ethnic groups were spared. Each family was given two hours to collect their belongings for the trip. Seven families were loaded into each boxcar, 20-25 families into each carriage. Like the other groups from the Caucasus, they were transported several thousand miles, to Central Asia. They were sealed off in these cattle wagons for a month.

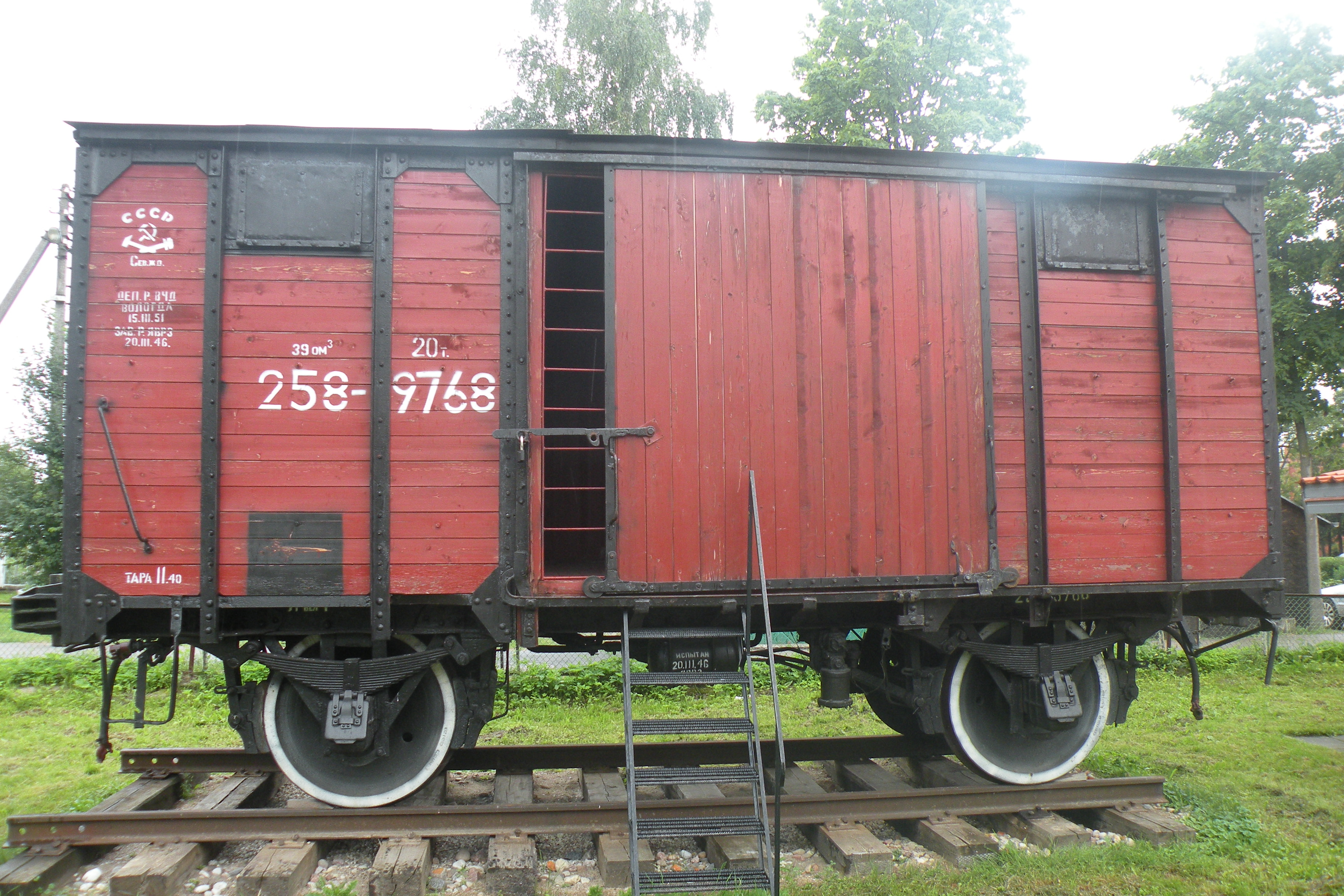
Cattle wagons used for the Soviet deportations

4,000 NKVD agents were appointed to carry out the operation. Like the previous deportations, this one was also supervised by the NKVD chief Lavrentiy Beria. It was ordered by the Premier of the Soviet Union Joseph Stalin. Stalin allocated 34 million roubles to the NKVD in order to carry it out. It was part of the Soviet forced settlement program and population transfer that affected several million members of non-Russian Soviet ethnic minorities between the 1930s and the 1950s. During World War II alone, 3,332,589 persons were deported in the Soviet Union. Throughout the Caucasus, about 650,000 people were deported in 1943 and 1944.

This was the last Soviet deportation during World War II. Until 1956, the Soviet authorities denied the Meskhetian Turks any civic or political rights. Around 32,000 people, mostly Armenians, were settled by the Soviet authorities in the cleared areas.

== Possible reasons ==
Unlike the other five ethnic groups of the Caucasus who were accused of Axis collaboration during World War II, the Meskhetian Turks were never officially charged by the Soviet government with any crime; they were not close to any combat. In spite of this, they were deported as well. The German army never came within a range of 100 miles of the Meskheti region. Professor Brian Glyn Williams concluded that the deportations of Meskhetian Turks, which coincided with the deportation of other ethnic groups from Caucasus and Crimea, lends the strongest evidence that all the deportations were a part of a larger concealed Soviet foreign policy rather than a response to any "universal mass treason" of these people. Svante Cornell pointed out that the eviction was a part of a larger Russian policy that had been in effect since 1864: to remove as many Muslim minorities from the Caucasus as possible.

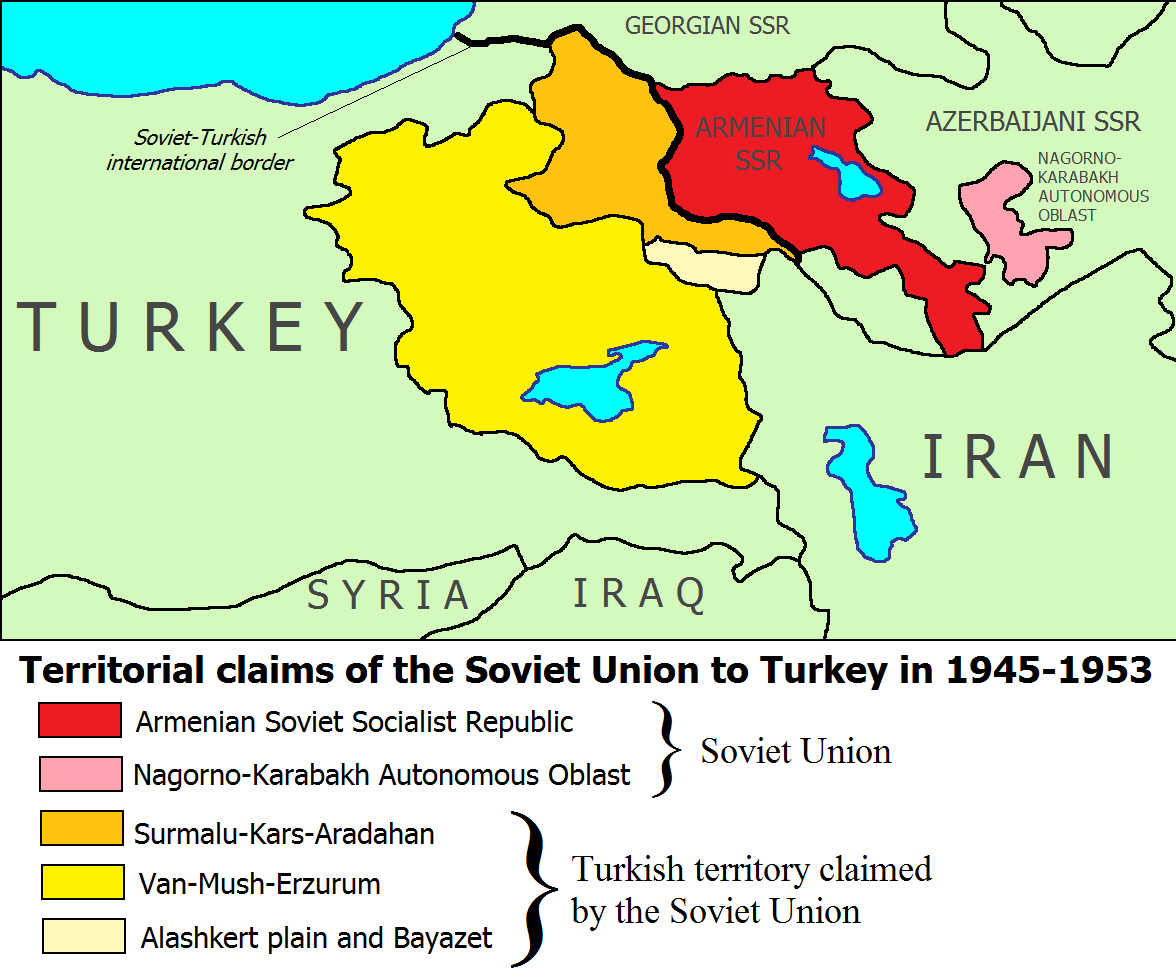
Map showing the territorial claims of the Soviet Union towards Turkey in 1945

Beria sent a memorandum to Stalin on 28 November 1944, in which he accused the Meskhetian Turks of "smuggling" and of being "used by Turkish intelligence for espionage". Beria's secret decree painted the Meskhetian Turks, the Kurds and the Hemshils as "untrustworthy population" that must be removed from the border region. Some historians interpret this eviction by Stalin's plan to remove the pro-Turkish group from the border area in order to obtain parts of northeastern Turkey. In June 1945, Vyacheslav Molotov, the Soviet Minister of Foreign Affairs, demanded of Turkey that it cedes three Anatolian provinces to the Soviet Union: Kars, Ardahan and Artvin. Scholars Alexandre Bennigsen and Marie Broxup concluded that the deportation of the Meskhetian Turks was thus undertaken as a precaution in case of a Soviet–Turkish war for eastern parts of Turkey. These claims, and the Turkish Straits crisis, escalated, until the plans failed when Turkey joined NATO in 1951.

The Soviet authorities tried to forge a state out of 108 different nationalities. Initially they tried to use this multiethnic state to exploit cross-border ethnic groups to project influence into the countries neighboring the Soviet Union. Terry Martin, a professor of Russian studies, assessed that this had the opposite effect; the Soviet fear of "capitalist influence" eventually led to ethnic cleansing of its borderlands, which encompassed the Meskhetian Turks.

== Death toll ==
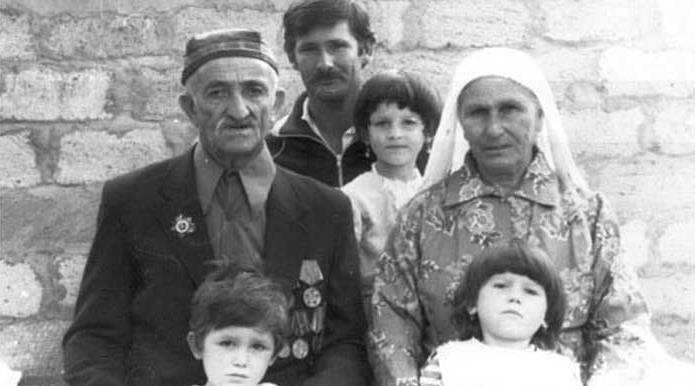
A surviving Meskhetian Turk family in Uzbekistan

The Meskhetian Turks were placed under the administration of the special settlements. The purpose of these settlements was to be a system of cheap labor for the economic progress of faraway parts of the Soviet Union. Many of those deported performed forced labor. Special settlers routinely worked eleven to twelve hours a day, seven days a week. They suffered from exhaustion and frostbite, and were denied their food rations if they did not meet their work quota. The lack of food was apparently so severe that the Soviet Council of People's Commissars adopted the decree N 942 rs which provided 857,000 kilograms (1,889,000 lb) of flour and 213,000 kilograms (470,000 lb) of cereals to the settlers from the Georgian SSR. The exiled peoples had to report to their surveillance organs on a weekly basis and were not allowed to travel anywhere outside their settlements. However, Meskhetian Turks were treated somewhat better than other ethnic groups in the special settlements because they had not been accused of a specific crime.

During their first 12 years in the special settlements, the exiled Meskhetian Turks coped with extreme deprivation and isolation from the outside world. They suffered a considerable hardship during the first years in exile. These included poor quality of food and medicine; the process of adaptation to the new climate, epidemics, which included spotted fever, and forced labor.

Estimates of the mortality rate of the Meskhetian Turks differ. The Karachay demographer D. M. Ediev estimated that 12,589 Meskhetian Turks died due to the deportation, amounting to a 13 percent mortality rate of their entire ethnic group. Professor Michael Rywkin gave a higher figure of 15,000 fatalities among this ethnic group. Official, but incomplete, Soviet archives recorded 14,895 deaths or a 14 percent to 15.7 percent mortality rate among the people deported from the Georgian Soviet Socialist Republic. This list included all the groups from the region, but the Meskhetian Turks formed a large majority of them. Soviet archives also record that an additional 457 people died during the transit to Central Asia. High assessments give a figure of 30,000 and up to 50,000 dead. By 1948, the mortality rate had fallen to 2.8%.

On 26 November 1948 the Presidium of the USSR Supreme Soviet issued a decree which sentenced the deported groups to permanent exile in those distant regions. This decree applied to Chechens and Ingush, Crimean Tatars, Volga Germans, Balkars, Kalmyks and the Meskhetian Turks.

== Aftermath ==
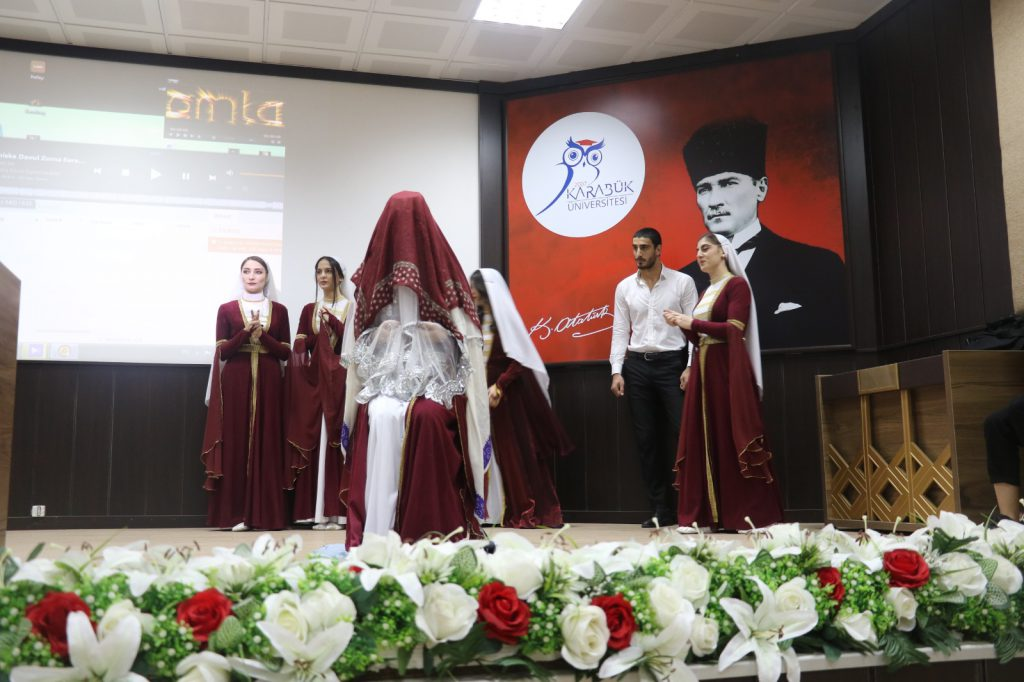
Meskhetian Turks' presentation about the deportation in Karabük, Turkey

Stalin's successor, the new Soviet leader Nikita Khrushchev, delivered a secret speech at the Communist Party Congress on 24 February 1956 condemning the Stalinist deportations, but did not mention the Meskhetian Turks among the deported peoples. The Decree of the Presidium of the Supreme Soviet of the USSR, dated 28 April 1956 and titled "On the removal of special deportation restrictions from the Crimean Tatars, Balkars, Soviet Turks, Kurds, Hemshils and members of their families deported during the Great Patriotic War" ordered the release of these ethnic groups from the administrative control of the MVD bodies, but did not envisage their return to their native lands. Unlike other deported peoples, the Meskhetian Turks were not rehabilitated. They were one of three ethnic groups who were not allowed to return to their native lands, the other two being the Volga Germans and the Crimean Tatars.

Official Soviet publications made no mention of either the Meskhetian Turks nor their region of origin between 1945 and 1968. On 30 May 1968 a decree of Presidium of the Supreme Soviet acknowledged their deportation, but its text claimed that the Meskhetian Turks "had taken roots" in their new homes of Kazakhstan and Uzbekistan, and called upon them to stay there. The Meskhetian Turks signed 144 petitions in 45 years, demanding a right to return. In 1964 they formed the Turkish Association for the National Rights of the Turkish People in Exile and tried to contact the U.N. and Amnesty International to help them return. Between 1961 and 1969, there were six attempts to return to Georgia, but these groups were all deported once again. In the 1960s, the Soviet government resorted to repression in order to suppress the Meskhetian Turk movement that demanded a right to return to the Meshekti region. The methods included arrests, intimidation and imprisonment of Meskhetian Turk activists. Moreover, on 26 July 1968, Vasil Mzhavanadze, the First Secretary of the Communist Party of the Georgian SSR, announced that there was no room for the return of that ethnic group in the area and that only 100 families might return per year. 1,211 Meskhetian Turks returned to Georgia, but were dispersed away from the Meskheti region, to the western part of the country. In June 1988, some 200 representatives of the ethnic group protested in the Borjomi District, demanding a right to return. By 1989, only 35 families remained in Georgia, while the only Meskhetian Turks who returned to the Meskheti region were eventually forced to leave it.

They tell us we're unwanted: in Uzbekistan the Uzbeks tell us, in Kazakhstan the Kazakhs tell us, and now there are whisperings in other republics... Where can we live, if they won't even let us onto the land of our ancestors?

— Anonymous Meskhetian Turk surgeon in Kazakhstan, 1991

The situation changed, at least on paper, in the late 1980s when the new Soviet leader, Mikhail Gorbachev, decided to break all ties with the Stalinist past. On 14 November 1989, the Supreme Soviet declared that the forced displacement of ethnic groups during Stalin's era, including the Meskhetian Turks, was "illegal and criminal". On 26 April 1991 the Supreme Soviet of the Russian Socialist Federal Soviet Republic, under its chairman Boris Yeltsin, passed the law On the Rehabilitation of Repressed Peoples with Article 2 denouncing all mass deportations as "Stalin's policy of defamation and genocide". Even after the dissolution of the Soviet Union in 1991, the newly independent Georgia refused to give Meskhetian Turks the right to return to the Meskheti region. One of the rare exceptions in Georgia was Guram Mamulia, a politician, historian and human rights activist who advocated for the Meskhetian Turk right to move back to Meskheti. Unlike the other ethnic groups resettled during Soviet deportations, the Meskhetian Turks were sparsely mentioned in the books covering the subject by historians Alexander Nekrich and Robert Conquest. Russian historian Pavel Polian considered all of the deportations of entire ethnic groups during Stalin's era, including those from the Caucasus, as a crime against humanity. He also noted that the charges of treason were "both unfair and hypocritical" considering that almost 40,000 Meskhetian Turks fought on the Soviet side during World War II.

In June 1989, the Meskhetian Turks were victims of Uzbek nationalist violence in the Fergana valley. Until these events, only few people were aware of the existence of the Meskhetian Turks and very little scholarly research had been conducted about them. After the ethnic clashes in the Fergana valley, 70,000 Meskhetian Turks fled and were scattered across seven countries of the former Soviet Union. The Meskhetian Turks numbered between 260,000 and 335,000 people in 2006. Since Russian officials refused to grant the Meskhetian Turks the status of Russian citizens, the Council of Europe has described their position in Krasnodar as one of a "legal limbo". A majority of them remain de facto stateless people.

== See also ==
- Deportation of the Chechens and Ingush
- Deportation of the Crimean Tatars
- Deportation of the Karachays
- Deportation of the Kalmyks
- Deportation of Koreans in the Soviet Union
- Human rights in the Soviet Union
- Political repression in the Soviet Union
- Population transfer in the Soviet Union

== Bibliography ==
- Council of Europe (2006). Documents: working papers, 2005 ordinary session (second part), 25-29 April 2005, Vol. 3: Documents 10407, 10449-10533. Strasbourg: Council of Europe Publishing. ISBN 9789287157546.
- Human Rights Watch (1991). "Punished Peoples" of the Soviet Union: The Continuing Legacy of Stalin's Deportations" (PDF). New York City. OCLC 25705762.
- UNHCR (1999), Background Paper on Refugees and Asylum Seekers from Georgia, United Nations High Commissioner for Refugees
- Akiner, Shirin (2013). Islamic Peoples Of The Soviet Union. London: Routledge. ISBN 9781136142666. LCCN 82000140.
- Aydingün, Ayşegül (2002). "Creating, recreating and redefining ethnic identity: Ah Lska/Meskhetian Turks in Soviet and post-Soviet contexts". Central Asian Survey. 21 (2): 185–197. doi:10.1080/0263493022000010071. hdl:11511/39335. S2CID 143727214.
- Aydıngün, Ayşegül; Harding, Çiğdem Balım; Hoover, Matthew; Kuznetsov, Igor; Swerdlow, Steve (2006), Meskhetian Turks: An Introduction to their History, Culture, and Resettelment Experiences (PDF), Cultural Orientation Resource (COR) Center, archived from the original (PDF) on 2016-04-11
- Bennigsen, Alexandre; Broxup, Marie (1983). The Islamic threat to the Soviet State. New York: Taylor & Francis. ISBN 9781317831716. LCCN 82016826.
- Bhat, Bilal (2015). Cotton Cultivation and Child Labor in Post-Soviet Uzbekistan. Lanham, Maryland: Lexington Books. ISBN 9780739194799. OCLC 919317268.
- Buckley, Cynthia J.; Ruble, Blair A.; Hofmann, Erin Trouth (2008). Migration, Homeland, and Belonging in Eurasia. Washington, D.C.: Woodrow Wilson Center Press. ISBN 978-0801890758. LCCN 2008-015571.
- Bugay, Nikolay (1996). The Deportation of Peoples in the Soviet Union. New York City: Nova Publishers. ISBN 9781560723714. OCLC 1074118940.
- Bukharbayeva, Bagila (2019). The Vanishing Generation: Faith and Uprising in Modern Uzbekistan. Bloomington: Indiana University Press. doi:10.2307/j.ctvfc55jx. ISBN 9780253040848. OCLC 1099473617. S2CID 159411598.
- Cohen, Saul Bernard (2014). Geopolitics: The Geography of International Relations. Lanham, Maryland: Rowman & Littlefield. ISBN 9781442223516. LCCN 2014029230.
- Cornell, Svante (2005). Small Nations and Great Powers: A Study of Ethnopolitical Conflict in the Caucasus. Richmond, Surrey: Routledge. ISBN 9781135796686. LCCN 2001347121.
- Hasanli, Jamil (2011). Stalin and the Turkish Crisis of the Cold War, 1945-1953. Lanham, Maryland: Lexington Books. ISBN 9780739168073. LCCN 2011017370.
- Hasanli, Jamil (2014). Khrushchev's Thaw and National Identity in Soviet Azerbaijan, 1954–1959 (revised ed.). Lanham, Maryland: Lexington Books. ISBN 9781498508148. LCCN 2014036925.
- Jägerskiöld, Stig (1986). Mannerheim. Minneapolis: University of Minnesota Press. ISBN 9781850650096. LCCN 86016011.
- Jones, Stephen F. (1993). "Meskhetians: Muslim Georgians or Meskhetian Turks? A Community without a Homeland". Refuge. 13 (2): 14–16. doi:10.25071/1920-7336.21718.
- Kaiser, Robert J. (2017). The Geography of Nationalism in Russia and the USSR. Princeton, New Jersey: Princeton University Press. ISBN 9781400887293. LCCN 93034899.
- Kiernan, Ben (2007). Blood and Soil: A World History of Genocide and Extermination from Sparta to Darfur. New Haven: Yale University Press. p. 511. ISBN 9780300100983. LCCN 2007001525.
- Khazanov, Anatoly (1992). "Meskhetian Turks in search of self-identity". Central Asian Survey. 11 (4): 1–16. doi:10.1080/02634939208400787.
- Khazanov, Anatoly (1995). After the USSR: Ethnicity, Nationalism and Politics in the Commonwealth of Independent States. Madison: University of Wisconsin Press. ISBN 9780299148942. LCCN 95005696.
- Marie, Jean-Jacques (1995). Les peuples déportés d'Union soviétique; Volume 81 of Questions au XXe siècle. Bruxelles: Editions Complexe. ISBN 9782870275986. LCCN 96183004.
- Markusen, Eric; Kopf, David (1995). The Holocaust and strategic bombing: genocide and total war in the twentieth century. Boulder: Westview Press. ISBN 978-0813375328. LCCN 94032807.
- Martin, Terry Dean (2001). The Affirmative Action Empire: Nations and Nationalism in the Soviet Union, 1923-1939. Ithaca: Cornell University Press. ISBN 9780801486777. LCCN 2001003232.
- Mawdsley, Evan (1998). The Stalin Years: The Soviet Union, 1929-1953. Manchester: Manchester University Press. ISBN 9780719046001. LCCN 2003046365.
- Mikaberidze, Alexander (2015). Historical Dictionary of Georgia (2 ed.). Lanham, Maryland: Rowman & Littlefield. ISBN 9781442241466. LCCN 2014024518.
- Mirkhanova, Malika (2006). "People in exile: The oral history of Meskhetian Turks (Akhyskha Turkleri)". Journal of Muslim Minority Affairs. 26 (1): 33–44. doi:10.1080/13602000600738640. S2CID 145694240.
- Parrish, Michael (1996). The Lesser Terror: Soviet State Security, 1939-1953. Westport, Connecticut: Greenwood Publishing Group. ISBN 9780275951139. OCLC 630860745.
- Perovic, Jeronim (2018). From Conquest to Deportation: The North Caucasus under Russian Rule. New York: Oxford University. ISBN 9780190934675. OCLC 1083957407.
- Pohl, J. Otto (1999). Ethnic Cleansing in the Ussr, 1937-1949. Westport, Connecticut: Greenwood Publishing Group. ISBN 9780313309212. LCCN 98046822.
- Pohl, J. Otto (2000). "Stalin's genocide against the "Repressed Peoples"". Journal of Genocide Research. 2 (2): 267–293. doi:10.1080/713677598. S2CID 59194258.
- Pokalova, Elena (2015). Chechnya's Terrorist Network: The Evolution of Terrorism in Russia's North Caucasus. Santa Barbara: ABC-CLIO. ISBN 9781440831553. LCCN 2014038634.
- Polian, Pavel (2003). "Soviet Repression of Foreigners: The Great Terror, the Gulag, Deportations". In Dundovich, Elena; Gori, Francesca; Guercetti, Emanuela (eds.). Reflections on the Gulag: With a Documentary Index on the Italian Victims of Repression in the USSR. Milano: Feltrinelli Editore. ISBN 9788807990588. OCLC 803610496.
- Polian, Pavel (2004). Against Their Will: The History and Geography of Forced Migrations in the USSR. Budapest: Central European University Press. ISBN 9789639241688. LCCN 2003019544.
- Rywkin, Michael (1994). Moscow's Lost Empire. Armonk, New York: Routledge. ISBN 9781315287713. LCCN 93029308.
- Sakwa, Richard (2005). The Rise and Fall of the Soviet Union. London, New York: Routledge. p. 292. ISBN 9781134806027. LCCN 98051322.
- Swerdlow, Steve (2006). "Understanding Post-Soviet Ethnic Discrimination and the Effective Use of U.S. Refugee Resettlement: The Case of the Meskhetian Turks of Krasnodar Krai". California Law Review. 94 (6): 1827–1878. doi:10.2307/20439082. JSTOR 20439082. OCLC 774693343. Archived from the original on 2019-04-26.
- Travis, Hannibal (2013). Genocide, Ethnonationalism, and the United Nations: Exploring the Causes of Mass Killing Since 1945. New York City: Routledge. ISBN 9780415531252. LCCN 2012025946.
- Viola, Lynne (2007). The Unknown Gulag: The Lost World of Stalin's Special Settlements. Oxford: Oxford University Press. ISBN 9780195187694. OCLC 456302666.
- Warikoo, Kulbhushan; Norbu, Dawa (1992). Ethnicity and politics in Central Asia. New Delhi: South Asian Publishers. ISBN 9788170031567. LCCN 00063158.
- Williams, Brian Glyn (2001). The Crimean Tatars: The Diaspora Experience and the Forging of a Nation. Leiden: BRILL. ISBN 9789004121225. LCCN 2001035369.
- Wimbush, S. Enders; Wixman, Ronald (1975). "The Meskhetian Turks: A New Voice in Soviet Central Asia". Canadian Slavonic Papers. 17 (2): 320–340. doi:10.1080/00085006.1975.11091412. JSTOR 40866873.
