= Khuashak Tsokali =

Georgian politician

Khuashak Tsokali (Georgian: ხუაშაქ ცოქალი; also Khvashag Tsokali, Huashak Tsokali, Hwashak Tsokali) was a Georgian politician. She was the wife of an aristocrat of the blood and high official, Bega Surameli, and was also the mother of Rati I Surameli, the Eristavt-Eristavi (Grand-duke) of Kartli. Khuashak Tsokali was one of two female dignitaries (the other being Karvai Jaqeli) who negotiated on behalf of George III's successor, Tamar, to secure a peace deal with the rebellious political faction led by Qutlu Arslan c. 1184. The negotiators managed to bring an end to the conflict, with mutual concessions on both sides.
