= Zeda Vardzia =

Church in Aspindza, Georgia

- ზედა ვარძია
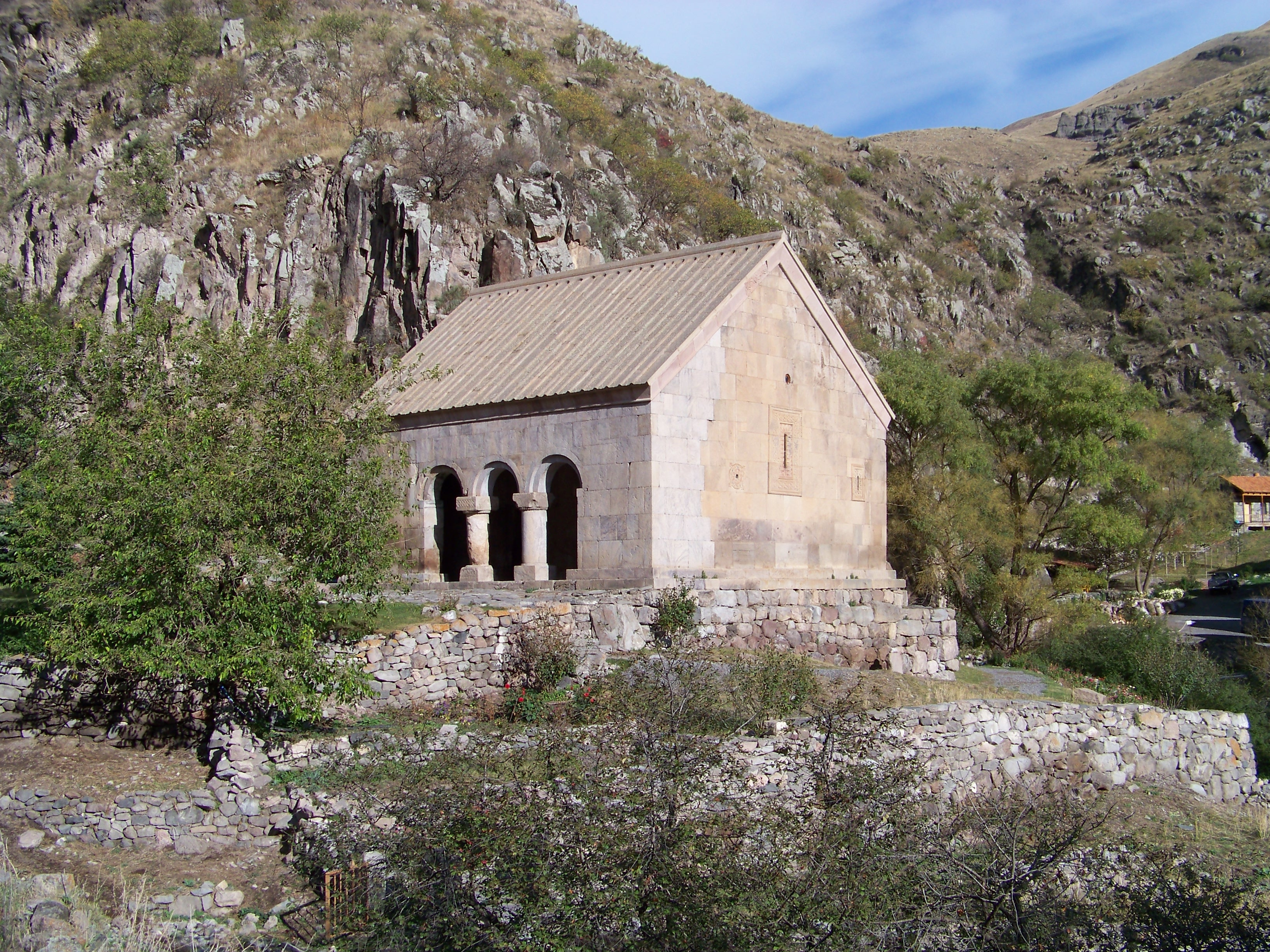
- Zeda Vardzia church
- Interactive map of Zeda Vardzia
- Location: Aspindza Municipality, Samtskhe-Javakheti, Georgia
- Coordinates: 41.383986°N 43.257528°E
- Type: Church

Zeda Vardzia (Georgian: ზედა ვარძია, literally, "upper Vardzia") is an 11th-century Georgian Orthodox church, of the Theotokos, located in the Aspindza Municipality in Georgia's southern region of Samtskhe-Javakheti. The church is situated 3 km northwest of Vardzia, the medieval rock-hewn complex. The church is inscribed on the list of the Immovable Cultural Monuments of National Significance of Georgia.

== History ==
The Zeda Vardzia church was constructed in the 11th century. An inscription on a basement wall stone mentions "Liparit, eristavt-eristavi", probably Liparit IV, Duke of Kldekari (died c. 1060). It was home to a monastic community which was moved to a new and much larger complex of rock-cut monasteries of Vardzia in the reign of George III of Georgia (r. 1156–1184).

After the Ottoman conquest of Samtskhe—the province where Zeda Vardzia was located—in the 16th century, the monastery was deserted and the church building fell in decay. The church was brought to scholarly attention by the French student of the Caucasian antiquities, Marie-Félicité Brosset, who visited the area from 1847 to 1848. In 1875, the Georgian scholar Dimitri Bakradze reported that Zeda Vardzia was used by the locally settled Kurds as an animal stall. Later, under the Soviet rule, the building was restored, from 1975 to 1978, by the architects R. Gverdtsiteli and T. Nemsadze. In 1997, the church was returned to a Christian use and settled by a community of nuns.

== Architecture ==
The Zeda Vardzia church is constructed on an artificially flattened rocky surface in the upper Zeda Vardzia ravine. It is a two-nave design, with an open three-arch stoa attached to the south. The western extension is a later addition. The edifice is built of evenly hewn rectangular andesite tuff blocks. The main nave is taller and larger than its northern counterpart and terminates in a deep apse. The two naves are connected through arches rested on two pillars. The interior was once frescoed, but they have mostly faded or been obliterated.

Both naves, covered with a pitched roof, are richly ornate on the exterior. Above the entrance there is a stylized Georgian inscription, in the medieval asomtavruli script, making mention of the ktitor Apridon, an important 12th-century dignitary. In a nearby rock there are a series of cave-dwellings for monks.
