= Rati I Surameli =

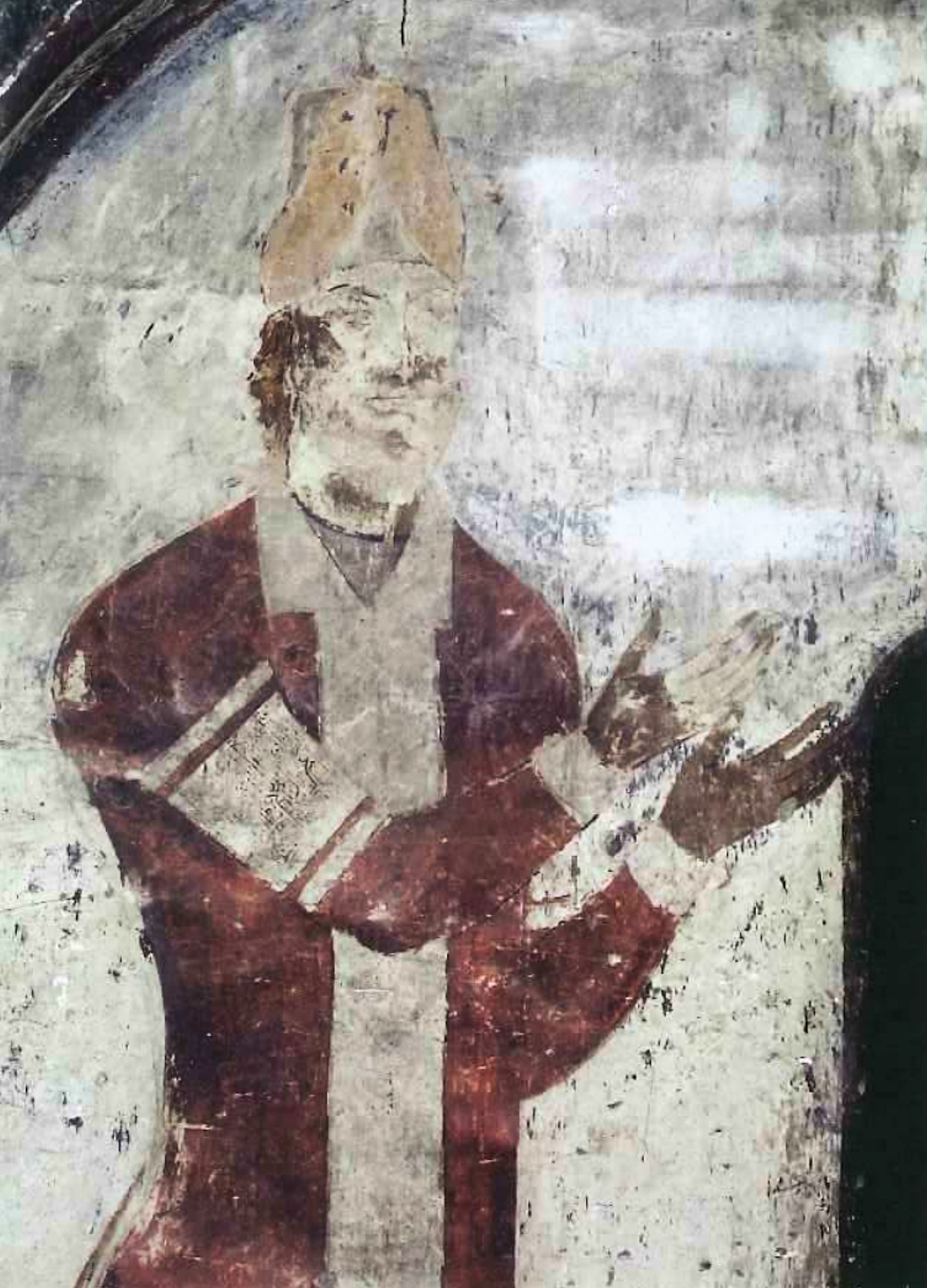
Rati I Surameli, fresco from Vardzia Monastery.

Rati I Surameli (Georgian: რატი I სურამელი) was a late-12th to early-13th-century Georgian nobleman who served as the Eristavi (duke) of Kartli.

He was the son of Bega I Surameli and Khuashak Tsokali. Following the rebellion of Prince Demna in 1177, King George III confiscated the title of Eristavi (Duke) of Kartli from Liparit Orbeli, a participant in the rebellion, and granted it to Rati I. Subsequently, the Surameli family became the hereditary Eristavis of Kartli. According to a royal charter issued by George III in 1170, Rati I donated the village of Kobali to the Mghvime Monastery. He was succeeded as the Eristavi of Kartli by his son, Sula.
