= Zeda Bakhvi =

Zeda Bakhvi ზედა ბახვი
- Village
- Location within Georgia Location within Guria
- Coordinates: 41°56′44″N 42°06′31″E
- Country: Georgia
- Mkhare: Guria
- Municipality: Ozurgeti
- Elevation: 150 m (490 ft)

Population (2014)
  - Total: 839
- Time zone: UTC+4 (Georgian Time)

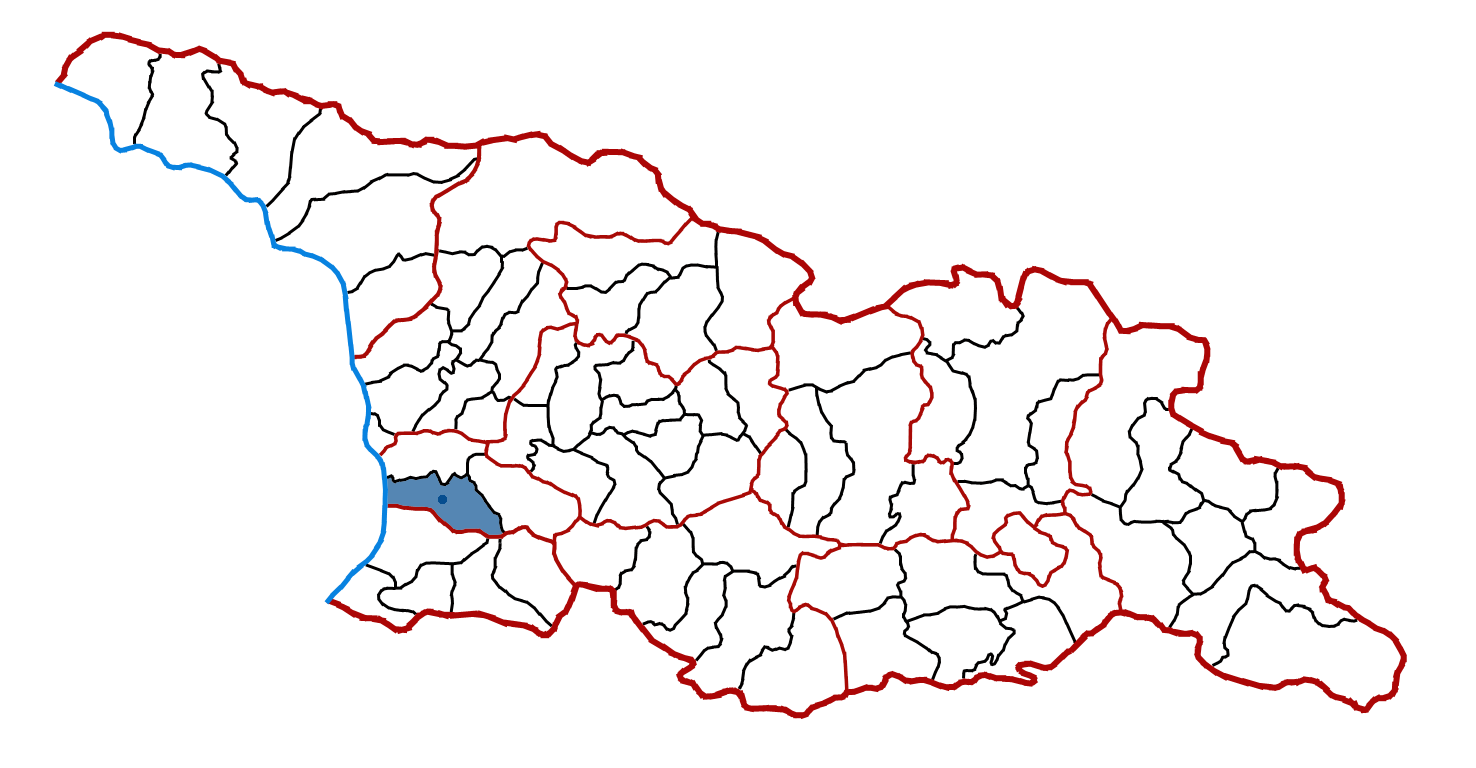
Location of Ozurgeti district in georgia

Zeda Bakhvi (Georgian: ზედა ბახვი) is a village in the Ozurgeti Municipality of Guria in western Georgia.
