= Zeda Uchkhubi =

Zeda Uchkhubi ზედა უჩხუბი
- Village
- Location within Georgia Location within Guria
- Coordinates: 41°55′25″N 42°05′50″E
- Country: Georgia
- Mkhare: Guria
- Municipality: Ozurgeti
- Elevation: 220 m (720 ft)

Population (2014)
  - Total: 335
- Time zone: UTC+4 (Georgian Time)

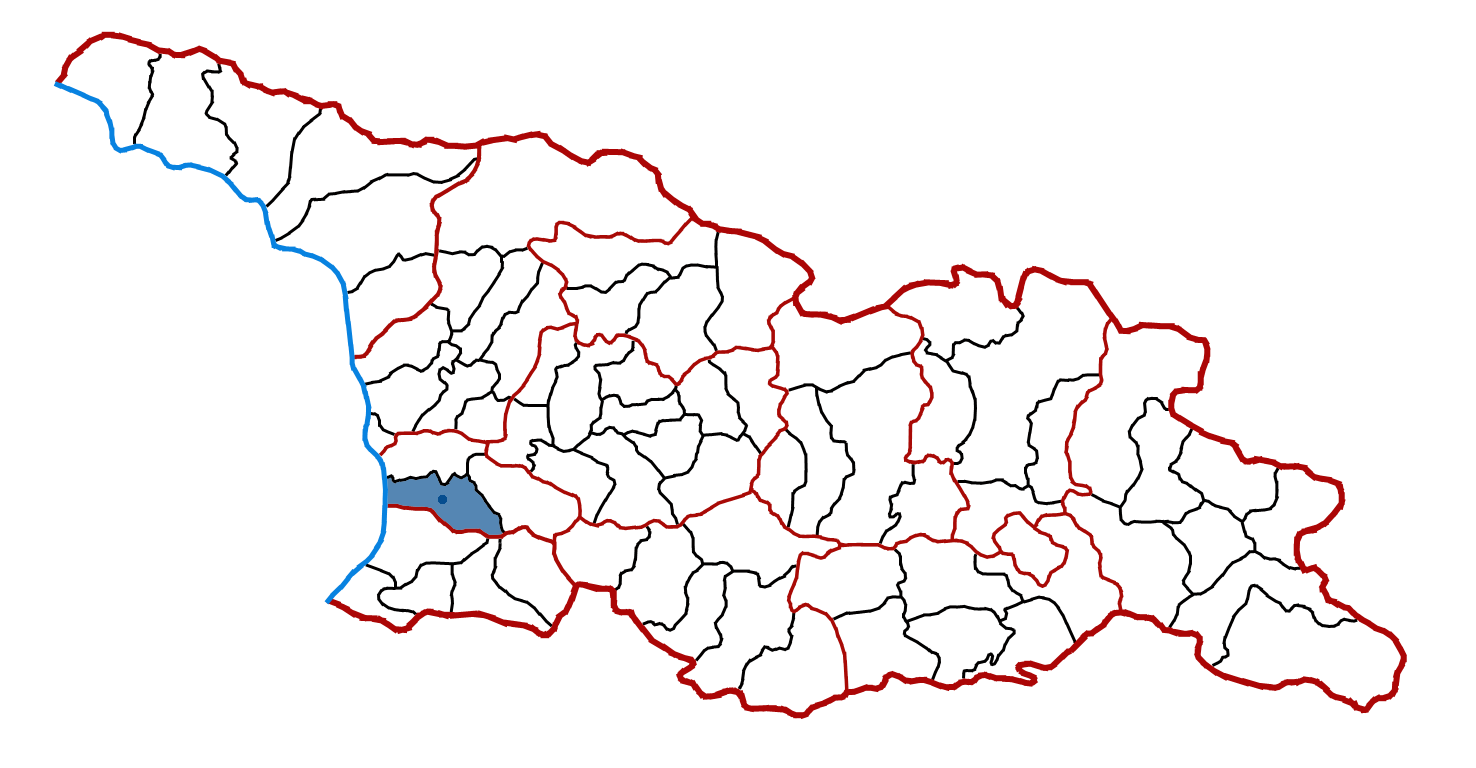
Location of Ozurgeti district in Georgia

Zeda Uchkhubi (Georgian: ზედა უჩხუბი) is a village in the Ozurgeti Municipality of Guria in western Georgia.
