= Aspindza Municipality =

Coordinates: 41°34′26″N 43°15′22″E

Aspindza Municipality ასპინძის მუნიციპალიტეტი
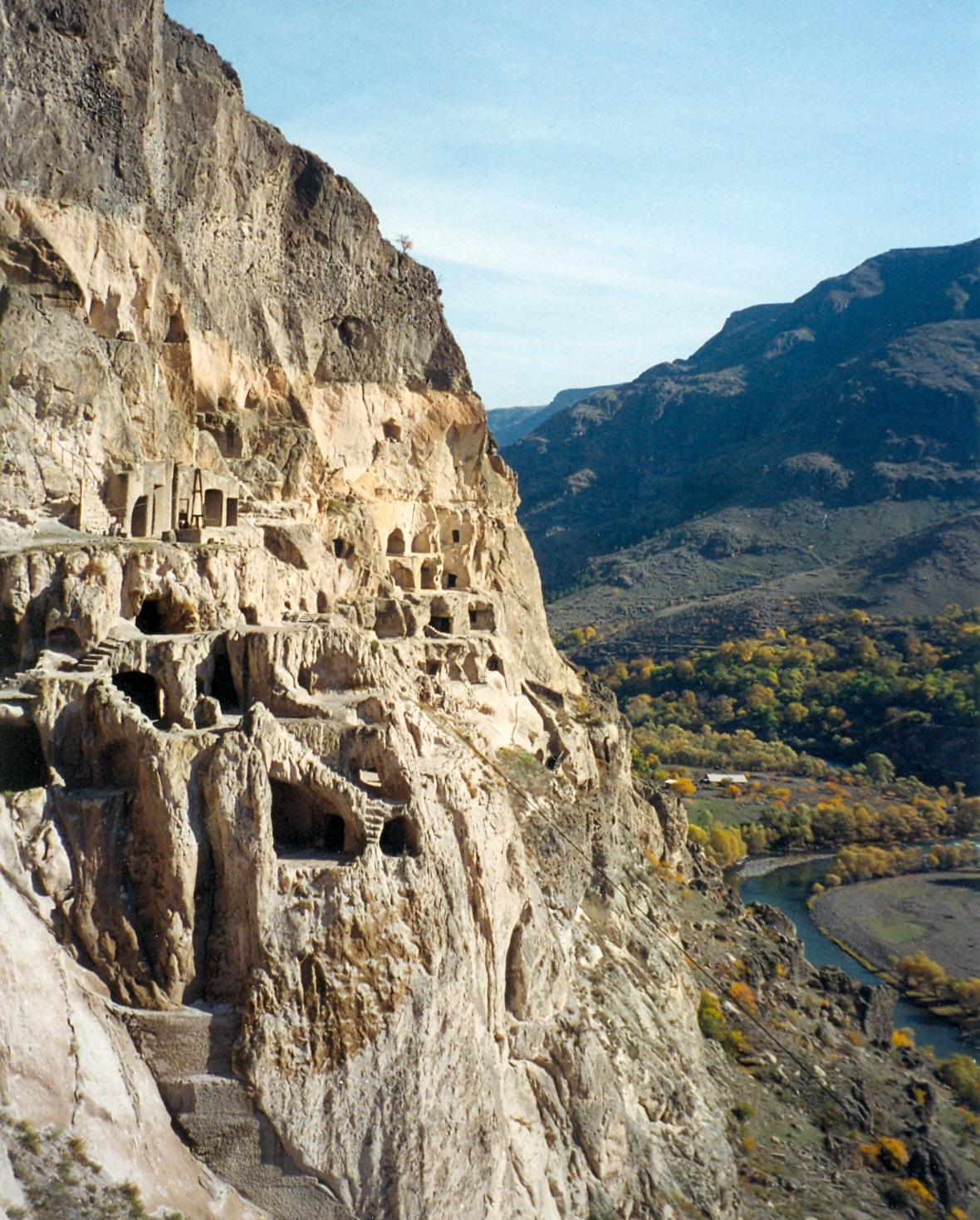
- Vardzia monastery

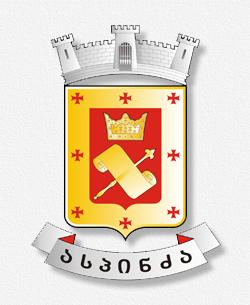
- Flag Seal

- Location of the municipality within Georgia
- Country: Georgia
- Mkhare: Samtskhe-Javakheti
- Capital: Aspindza

Government
  - Type: Mayor–Council
  - Mayor: Rostom Magraqvelidze (GD)

Area
  - Total: 825 km^{2} (319 sq mi)

Population (2021)
  - Total: 10,587
  - Density: 12.8/km^{2} (33.2/sq mi)
- Time zone: UTC+4 (Georgian Time)

Aspindza (Georgian: ასპინძის მუნიციპალიტეტი, Aspindzis munitsipalit'et'i) is a municipality in southern Georgia, in the region of Samtskhe-Javakheti with a population of 10,372 (2021). Its main town and administrative center is Aspindza and it has an area of 825 km^{2} (319 sq mi).

== Administrative divisions ==
Aspindza municipality is administratively divided into one borough (დაბა, daba), the municipal centre Aspindza and 18 communities (თემი, temi) with 55 villages (სოფელი, sopeli):

== Politics ==
Aspindza Municipal Assembly (Georgian: ასპინძის საკრებულო, Aspindzis Sakrebulo) is a representative body in Aspindza Municipality, consisting of 30 members which are elected every four years. The last election was held in October 2021. Rostom Magraqvelidze of Georgian Dream was elected mayor.

Party	2017	2021	Current Municipal Assembly
Georgian Dream	22	19	
United National Movement	1	6	
People's Power		3 (Note: Split from Georgian Dream.)	
European Georgia	2	1	
Lelo		1	
Alliance of Patriots	2		
Total	27	30	

== Population ==
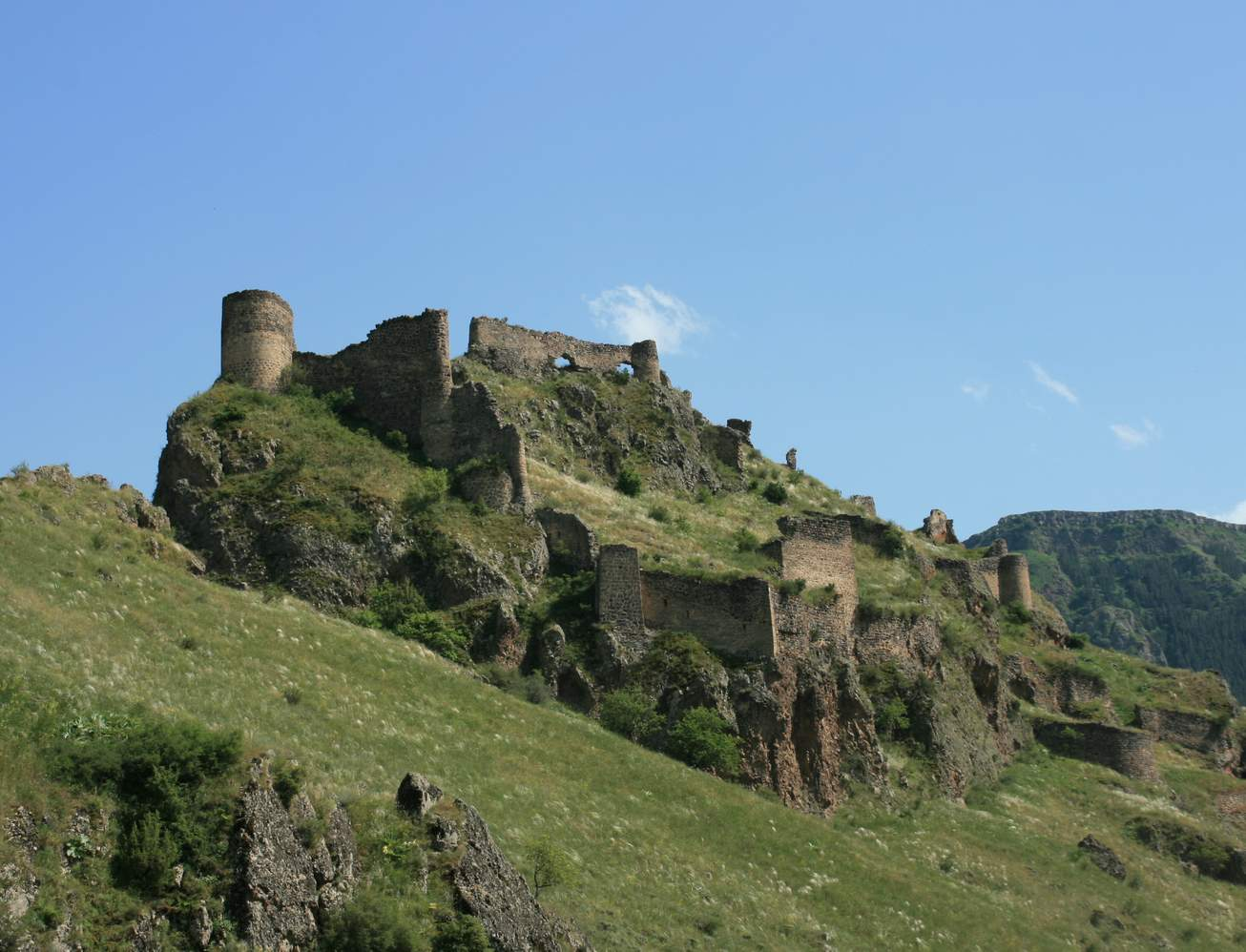
Tmogvi fortress

By the start of 2021 the population was determined at 10,587 people, a slight increase compared to the 2014 census. The population of Aspindza town decreased slightly during the same period. The population density of the municipality is 13.2 inhabitants per square kilometre (34/sq mi).

The population consists for 86% of Georgians. By far the largest ethnic minority are the Armenians, who make up more than 13% of the population. Almost all of them live in the village of Damala, just outside the main town of Aspindza. Furthermore, some Russians, Ossetes, Ukrainians and Greeks live in the municipality. The population consists for 74.8% of followers of the Georgian Orthodox Church and 11.6% is Muslim followed by followers of the Armenian Apostolic Church (almost 10%), Catholics (2.3%) and a small community of several dozen Jehovah's Witnesses.

Population Aspindza Municipality
	1886	1917	1923	1939	1959	1970	1979	1989	2002	2014	2021
Aspinda Municipality	-	-	-	32,644	▼11,265	▲12,494	▼12,264	▲13,262	▼13,010	▼10,372	▲10,587
Aspindza	-	553	▲679	▲1,461	▲1,609	▲2,550	▲2,877	▲3,711	▼3,243	▼2,793	▼2,648
Data: Population statistics Georgia 1897 to present. Note: (Note: The 2014 census found an inexplicable gap with the data from the national statistical office Geostat. UN-assisted research has found the 2002 census was inflated by about 8-9 percent. See, "1. Introduction", Page 1.)

In November 1944, the Meskhetian Turks, a Turkic-speaking ethnic group of predominantly Muslim faith living in this area, were deported to Soviet Central Asian republics as part of a Stalinist resettlement operation. At that time, the Meskhetians constituted two-thirds of the population of the rajon Aspindza (1939: 21,612 of the 32,644 inhabitants). Attempts to return them to independent Georgia have failed, with local resistance.

== See also ==
- List of municipalities in Georgia (country)
