= Stig Jägerskiöld =

Swedish professor, historian, and diplomat

Stig Axel Fridolf Jägerskiöld (20 April 1911 – 14 September 1997) was a Swedish professor in public law, international law and constitutional law. He was also a historian and a diplomat.
