= Vardzia =

Cave monastery in southern Georgia

Coordinates: 41°22′51.3″N 43°17′1.54″E

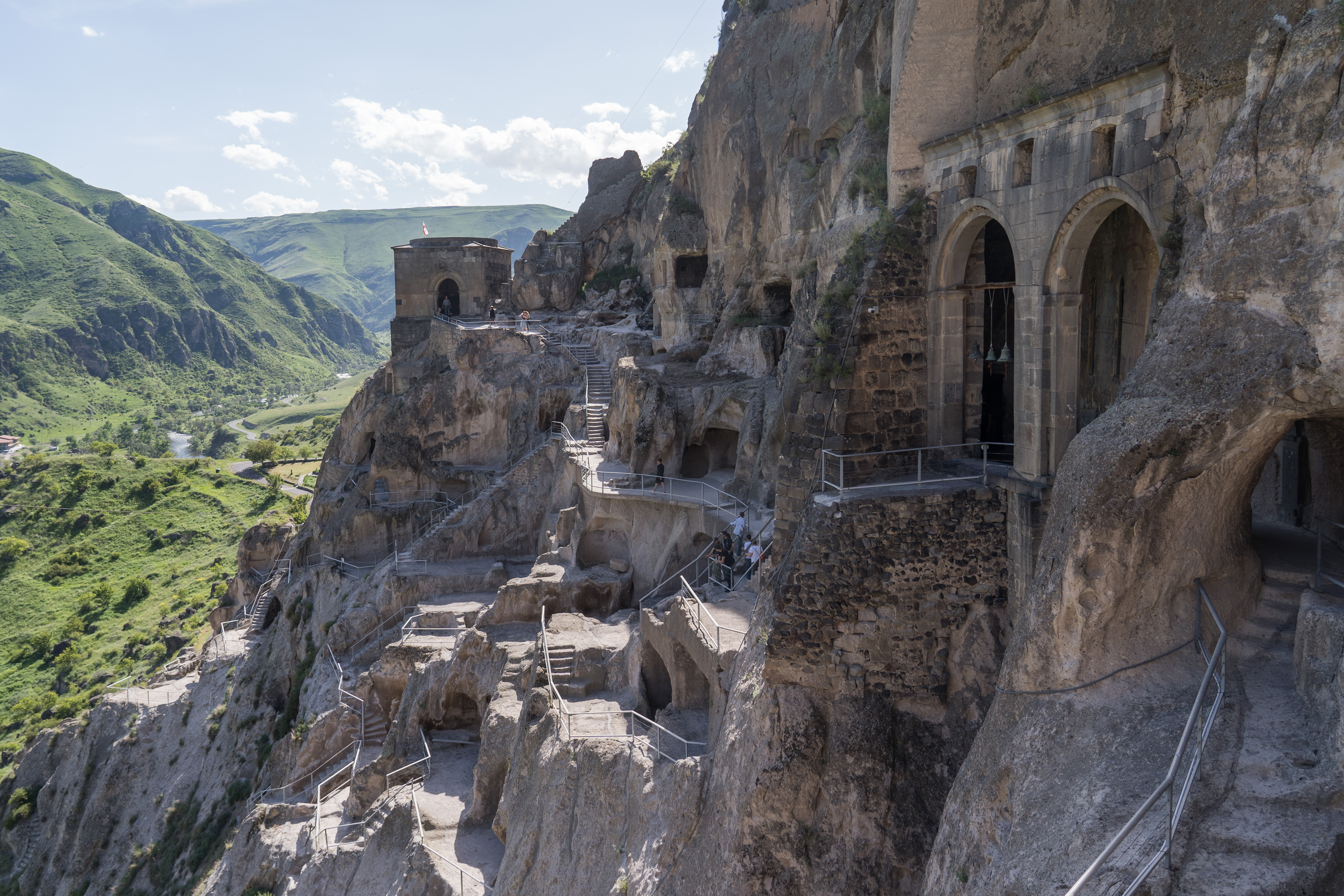
A view of Vardzia and the river Kura flowing in the valley below. Several monks still live onsite

Vardzia (Georgian: ვარძია [vaɾdzia]) is a cave monastery site in southern Georgia, excavated from the slopes of the Erusheti Mountain on the left bank of the Kura River, thirty kilometres from Aspindza. The main period of construction was the second half of the twelfth century. The caves stretch along the cliff for some five hundred meters and in up to nineteen tiers. The monastery was an important cultural center, a place of significant literary and artistic work.

The Church of the Dormition, dating to the 1180s during the golden age of Tamar and Rustaveli, has an important series of wall paintings. The site was largely abandoned after the Ottoman takeover in the sixteenth century. Now part of a state heritage reserve, the extended area of Vardzia-Khertvisi has been submitted for future inscription on the UNESCO World Heritage List.

== History ==
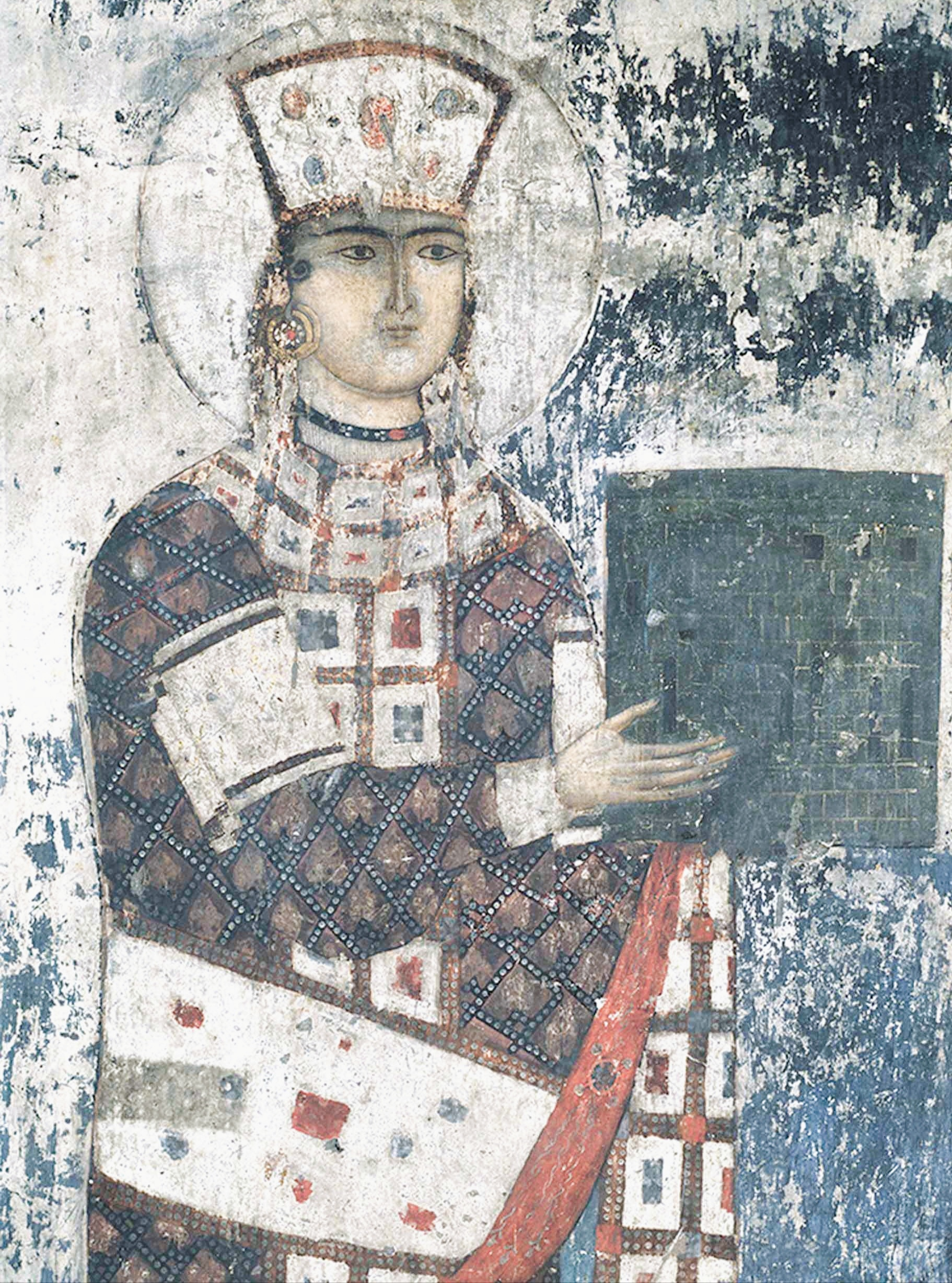
Tamar in the Church of the Dormition, with a model of the church; an aetiological myth has the young Tamar, when out hunting with Giorgi, lost in the caves; when called for, she replied "I am here, uncle" (Georgian: აქ ვარ ძია) "ak var dzia", giving the site its name

Soviet-era excavations have shown that the area of Vardzia was inhabited during the Bronze Age and indicated the reach of Trialeti culture. Cave settlements such as Uplistsikhe are known along the Kura River from at least the fifth century BC, while rock cut architecture in the context of Georgian Christianity is known from Zedazeni and Garedzhi from the sixth century AD, and more locally from Vanis Kvabebi, Cholta and Margastani from the eighth century. Four distinct building phases have been identified at Vardzia: the first during the reign of Giorgi III (1156–1184), when the site was laid out and the first cave dwellings excavated; the second between his death and the marriage of his successor Tamar in 1186, when the Church of the Dormition was carved out and decorated; the third from that date until the Battle of Basian c.1203, during which time many more dwellings as well as the defences, water supply, and irrigation network were constructed; while the fourth was a period of partial rebuilding after heavy damage in the earthquake of 1283.

A number of documentary sources supplement the knowledge derived from the site's physical fabric. The collection of chronicles known as the History of Georgia refers to Tamar erecting a church to house the icon of the Virgin of Vardzia after receiving divine help in her campaigns, before transferring the monastery from Upper or Zeda Vardzia. Tamar is said to have departed from Vardzia during her campaign against the Muslims, and her ensuing victory at Basian is celebrated in the Hymns in Honour of the Virgin of Vardzia by Ioane Shavteli. The History of Georgia also relates how Vardzia escaped the Mongol invaders in the 1290s. The monastery, according to chronicles, contained large amount of valuables from silver, gold and precious stones, indicating its economic prosperity. Construction on the site continued also after Tamar's death. The belltower and the southern church portal were built in the late 13th and early 14th centuries.

According to the inscription above the portal, the dining hall was constructed during the rule of atabeg Ivane, in the first half of the 15th century. Certain caves of the Ananauri complex were also built in the 15th and 16th centuries. The Persian Safavid chronicler Hasan Beg Rumlu describes Vardzia as a "wonder", "impregnable as the wall of Alexander the Great", before recounting its sack by the Persians under Shah Tahmasp I in 1551; a near-contemporary note in the Vardzia Gospel tells of its repatriation from a Persian bazaar. After the arrival of the Ottomans in 1578, the monks departed and the site was abandoned. Part of the valuables were moved to the Imeretian village of Vardzia, where they were presumably used for construction of the church and the belltower.

== Site ==
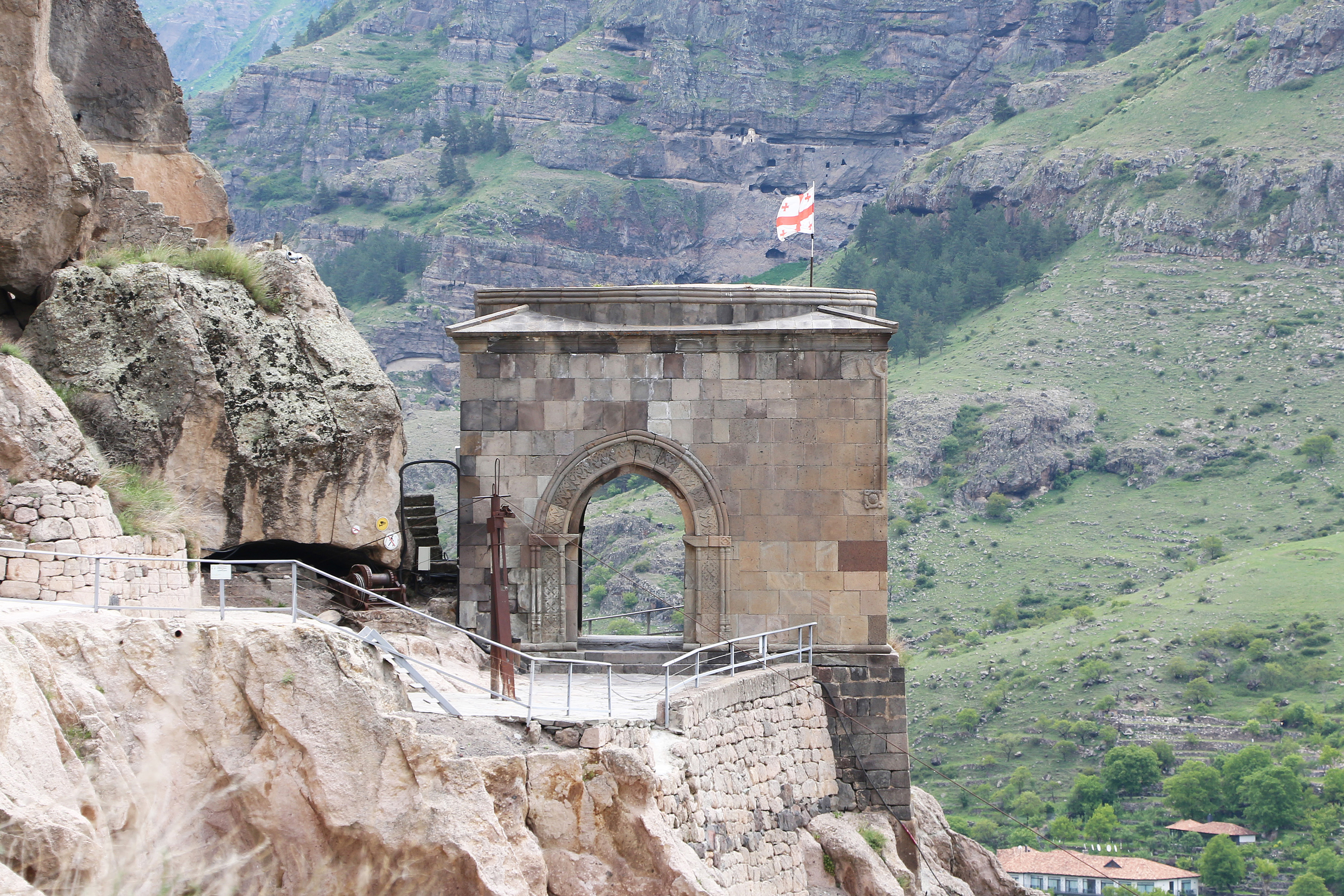
Gate on the site

The greater Vardzia area includes fifteen churches. The most significant, apart from the Church of Dormition, are also the early eleventh-century church at Zeda Vardzia and the tenth- to twelfth-century rock village and cave churches of Ananauri. The latter contains original frescos. The main lower site was carved from the cliff's central stratum of tufaceous breccia at an elevation of thirteen hundred metres above sea level. In total it contains about 500 caves. It is divided into an eastern and a western part by the Church of the Dormition. In the eastern part of the complex are seventy-nine separate cave dwellings, in eight tiers and with a total of 242 rooms, including six chapels, "Tamar's Room", a meeting room, reception chamber, pharmacy, and twenty-five wine cellars; 185 wine jars sunk into the floor document the importance of viticulture to the monastic economy. In the western part, between the bell tower and the main church, are a further forty houses, in thirteen tiers and with a total of 165 rooms, including six chapels, a refectory with a bakery, other ovens for baking bread, and a forge. Beyond the bell tower the complex rises to nineteen tiers, with steps leading to a cemetery. Infrastructure includes access tunnels, water facilities, and provision for defence. Water was supplied via 3.5 km long aqueduct from Zeda Vardzia village.

Ananauri complex is situated in the western part of Vardzia. It contains a number of caves, the church and the tunnel. The small church belongs to the hall type. It has the western portal and supplementary room from the north. The portal is decorated by frescoes. The hall decorations contain a wide variety of themes.

== Church of the Dormition ==
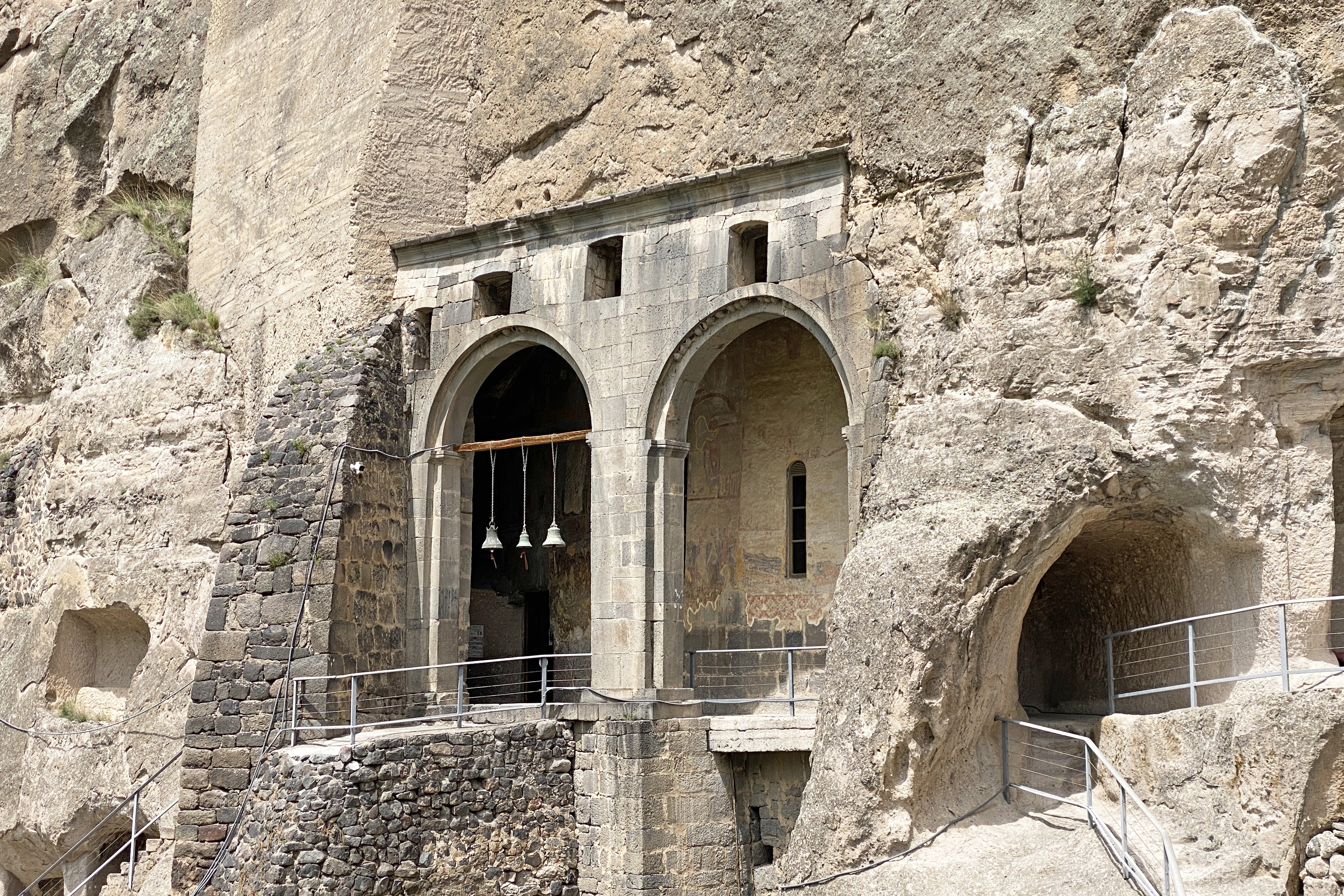
Church of the Dormition

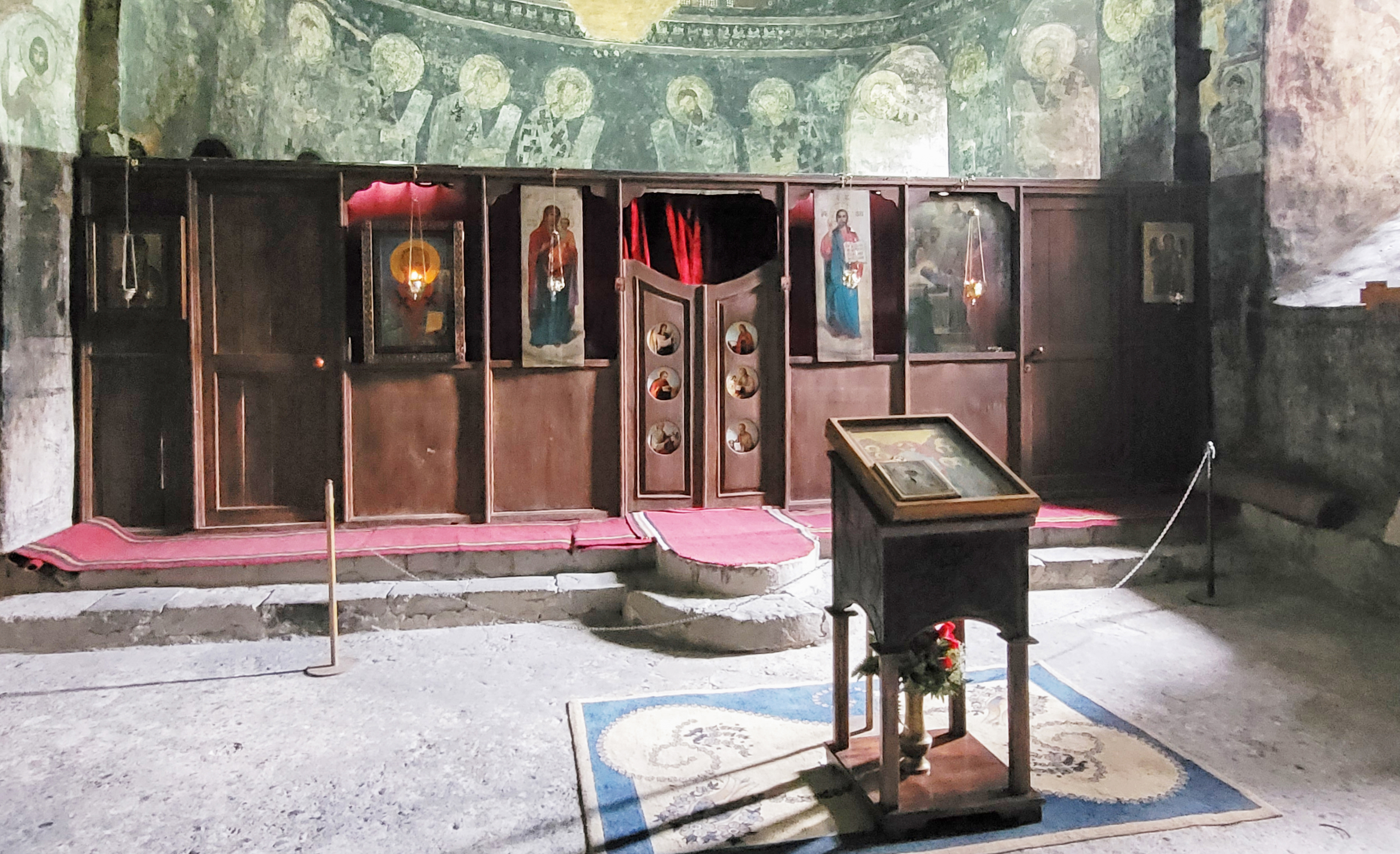
Nave from the sanctuary

The Church of the Dormition was the central spiritual and monumental focus of the site. Carved similarly from the rock, its walls reinforced in stone, it measures 8.2 metres (27 ft) by 14.5 metres (48 ft), rising to a height of 9.2 metres (30 ft). The spacious hall with broad apse and conch is covered by the barrel vault. Additional rooms are adjacent to the west and north. The narthex is in the southern part. The church is illuminated by three windows. The western adjacent room leads to another separate hall, which has a tunnel, ending with the cold water pool.

Both church and narthex are painted; these paintings are of "crucial significance in the development of the Medieval Georgian mural painting". Its patron, Rati I Surameli, is commemorated in a donor portrait on the north wall; the accompanying inscription reads "Mother of God, accept ... the offering of your servant Rati, eristavi of Kartli, who has zealously decorated this holy church to your glory". On the same north wall are portraits of the royal founders, Giorgi III and Tamar, holding the church model. Both are dressed in Byzantine ceremonial clothes, in crowns, with halos. Tamar lacks the ribbon that is the attribute of a married woman and her inscription includes the formula "God grant her a long life", while that of Giorgi does not; this helps date the paintings to between Giorgi's death in 1184 and Tamar's marriage in 1186. The depiction of Tamar is the earliest among the four known.

Episodes from the life of Christ occupy the vaults and upper walls in a sequence, starting with the Annunciation, followed by the Nativity, Presentation in the Temple, Baptism, Transfiguration, Raising of Lazarus, Triumphal Entry into Jerusalem, Last Supper, Washing of the Feet, Crucifixion, Harrowing of Hell, Ascension, Descent of the Holy Spirit, and Dormition (the church is sometimes known as the Church of the Assumption, which corresponds with the Orthodox Feast of the Dormition). At a lower level, more accessible as intercessors, are paintings of saints and stylites. On the rear wall of the sanctuary, behind the altar, are Twelve Church Fathers. In the narthex are scenes of the Last Judgment, Bosom of Abraham, Angels bearing a Medallion with the Cross, and three scenes from the life of Saint Stephen; other paintings were lost in the 1283 earthquake. The paintings are not frescoes, but executed in secco, and "testify to contacts with the Christian Orient and the Byzantine world, but applied using local artistic traditions". The walls were painted by an artist Georgi, whose name is written in the altar part.

== Management ==
Since 1985 the site has formed part of the Vardzia Historical–Architectural Museum-Reserve, which includes forty-six architectural sites, twelve archaeological sites, and twenty-one sites of monumental art. In 1999 Vardzia-Khertvisi was submitted for inscription on the UNESCO World Heritage List as a Cultural Site in accordance with criteria ii, iii, iv, v, and vi. In their evaluation, advisory body ICOMOS cited Göreme in Cappadocia as the closest comparandum amongst cave monastery sites of international significance. In 2007 Vardzia-Khertvisi was resubmitted as a mixed Cultural and Natural Site in accordance also with criterion vii. From 2012, conservation of the wall paintings in the Church of the Dormition is to be carried out by the Courtauld Institute of Art in conjunction with the National Agency for Cultural Heritage Preservation of Georgia and Tbilisi State Academy of Arts.

== Panorama ==
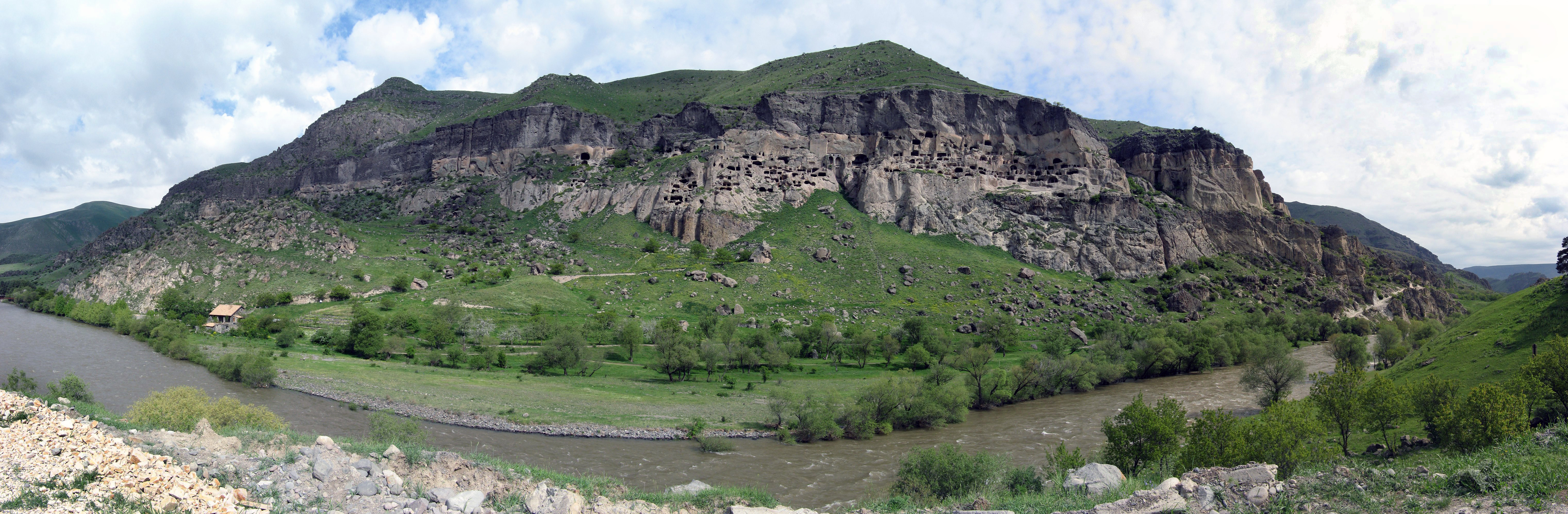
Vardzia cave monastery (panorama)

== See also ==
- Christianity in Georgia
- Culture of Georgia
- Georgian polyphony
- Byzantine art
- Uplistsikhe
