= Aspindza =

Aspindza ასპინძა
- Borough
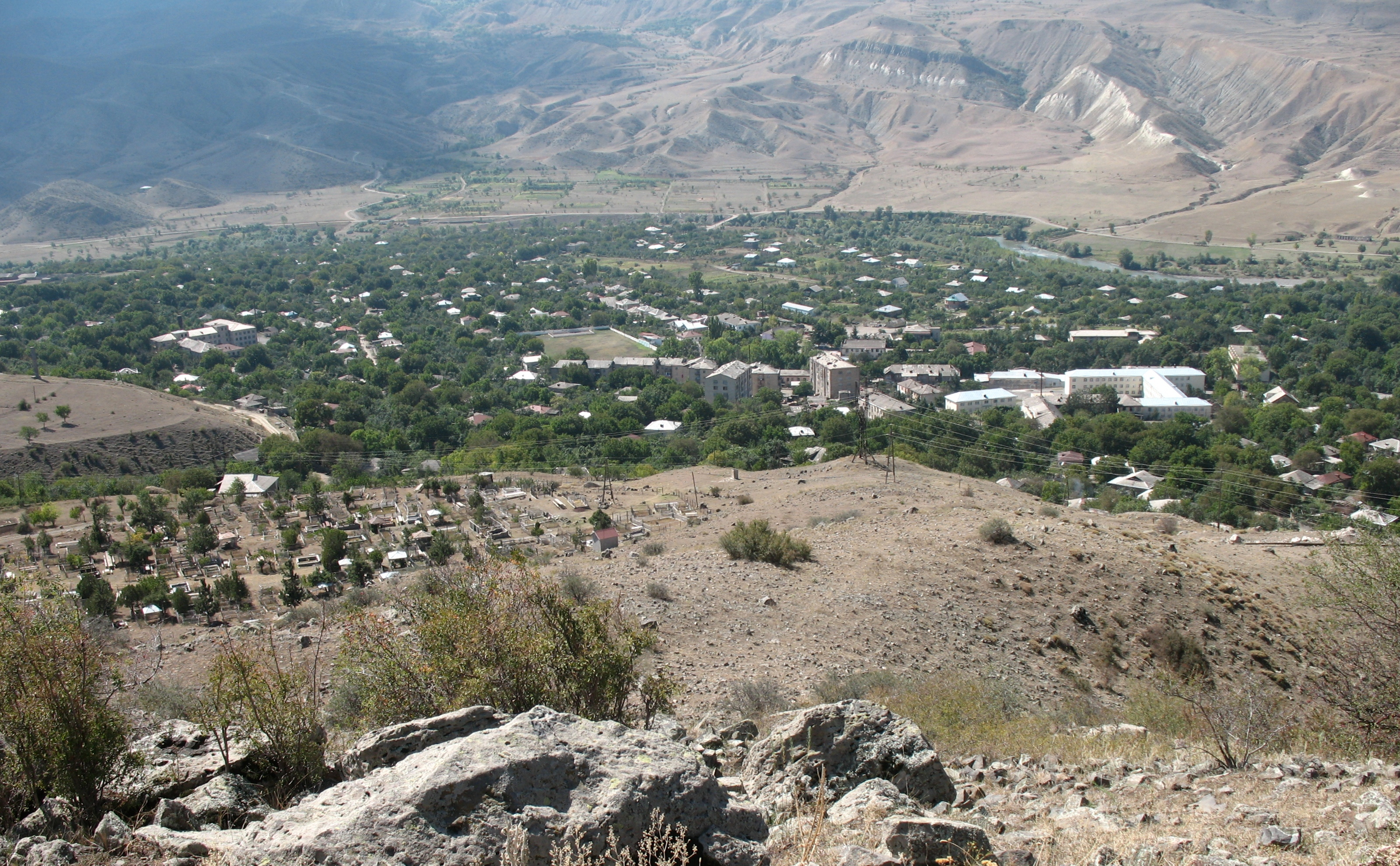

- Location in Georgia Aspindza (Samtskhe-Javakheti)
- Coordinates: 41°34′24″N 43°15′00″E
- Country: Georgia
- Region: Samtskhe-Javakheti
- District: Aspindza
- Borough from: 1961
- Elevation: 1,090 m (3,580 ft)

Population (2014)
  - Total: 2,793
- Time zone: GMT+4

Aspindza (Georgian: ასპინძა [äs̪pʼin̪d̪͡z̪ä]) is a daba ("small town") in southern Georgia's region of Samtskhe-Javakheti with a population of 2,793 (2014 census), mostly ethnic Georgians. It is located at around 41°34′26″N 43°15′22″E.

== History ==
The word "Aspindza" derives from a Persian word "اسب انداز", which means "a place to rest". The year of the foundation the town is considered to be 888, as Leonti Mroveli (Georgian: ლეონტი მროველი) tells -

The run away Nasra was caught near Samtskhe, and killed by Aspindza in the year 888

By the end of the 16th century Aspindza had been conquered by the Ottoman Turks. According to their census, "Aspindza was a big village, that consisted of 50 families with gardens and orchards". The village is mentioned in chronicle of Sumbat Davitisdze (Georgian: სუმბატ დავითის ძე) and Vakhushti (Georgian: ვახუშტი).

== Literature ==
- "ასპინძა" (PDF). Georgian Soviet Encyclopedia (in Georgian). Vol. 1. 1975. p. 640.

== See also ==
- Samtskhe-Javakheti
