= Armenians in Samtskhe–Javakheti =

Ethnic group in Georgia

Total population
- 80,000

Regions with significant populations
- Samtskhe–Javakheti

Languages
- Armenian

Religion
- 80% Armenian Apostolic Church 20% Armenian Catholic Church

Related ethnic groups
- Armenians in Georgia

Location of Samtskhe–Javakheti within Georgia

Armenians in Samtskhe–Javakheti (Georgian: ჯავახელი სომხები Javakheli Somkhebi, Armenian: Ջաւախահայեր Jawakhahayer) are ethnic Armenians of Georgian nationality living in the Samtskhe–Javakheti region of the Republic of Georgia. The southern part of the region (Javakheti) borders Armenia to the south. Here, ethnic Armenians form the great majority of the population with minorities of Georgians, Russians and Caucasus Greeks. Among Armenians of Samtskhe–Javakheti, Armenian is the common language spoken.

== History ==
The region known to Armenians as Javakhk has long been tied to the Kingdom of Armenia with an Armenian presence there being recorded for millennia. Many of the Armenians in the region today immigrated from Erzurum Vilayet in the Ottoman Empire after the area became part of Russia in 1829 while most of the Muslims (Meskhetian Turks and Adjarians) in the region emigrated to the Ottoman Empire. More Armenians came to region later on as a result of Turkish massacres and the Armenian genocide. Russian Empire driven policy aimed to settle the Christian Armenians at the border of the Ottoman Empire, since they were enjoying the status of a reliable ally in contrast to the Muslim population.

Ethnic Armenians are chiefly concentrated in Akhalkalaki and Ninotsminda districts. At the beginning of 1918 in Akhalkalaki region had 120,000 population, from which Armenians were 89,000 (74%), Meskhetian Turks were 8,000 (7%), representatives of other nationalities 23,000 (19%) During this period in Ahalkalak district there were 111 villages from which 66 were Armenian, 24 Turkish, 9 Russian, 10 Georgian (including former Armenian villages Vargav and Hzabavra, the population of which had assimilated with Georgians), and one village with the Armenian-Georgian mixed population.

In 1944 the government of the Soviet Union exiled the Meskhetian Turkish population of Meskheti (approximately 100,000 person) to Central Asia (Kazakhstan and Uzbekistan). The five villages of Sagamo, Khavet, Erindja, Davnia, and Karsep in the Akhalkalaki district and the Bogdanovka areas were settled by Armenians.

During Zviad Gamsakhurdia's presidency (1991), Javakheti remained de facto semi-independent and only in November 1991 the Tbilisi-appointed governor was able to take power. The issue of Javakheti was in the 1990s "clearly been perceived as the most dangerous potential ethnic conflict in Georgia", however, no actual armed conflict ever occurred.

An incident took place in Akhalkalaki district on 14 August 1998. The Georgian military units were to hold exercises with the Russians in Akhalkalaki, and the local Armenian population was not told about it. The Georgians units entered the Armenian-populated areas and met some 25 Armenians, who "believed that the Georgian army was coming to deport Armenians from their homes". The group of Armenians were armed and allegedly had mortars and other artillery. The Georgian units eventually left, avoiding a possible clash with the armed men. According to the Georgian national security ministry was the incident was a provocation organized by the Javakhk organization.

Vahagn Chakhalyan, the leader of United Javakhk, was arrested in 2008. Chakhalyan was found guilty and sentenced to 10 years in 2009 for "acquisition and possession of firearms and ammunition, organizing a group action which grossly disrupted public order, hooliganism committed against a government representative." Chakhalyan was released from prison in January 2013 under amnesty law after Bidzina Ivanishvili and his Georgia Dream coalition came to power in Georgia.

== Demographics ==
This table is a comparing table of Armenian population of Samtskhe–Javakheti in 1939, 1989, 2002, 2014.

District	1939			1989			2002			2014		
District	Total	Armenians	Armenian %	Total	Armenians	Armenian %	Total	Armenians	Armenian %	Total	Armenians	Armenian %
Akhalkalaki	64,655	54,081	83.6	62,977	57,209	90.8	60,975	57,516	94.3	45,070	41,870	92.9
Akhaltsikhe	55,490	16,454	29.7	50,430	25,753	51	46,134	16,879	36.6	42,394	12,028	28.4
Ninotsminda	34,575	27,376	79.2	32,064	27,090	84.5	34,305	32,857	95.8	24,491	23,262	95
Adigeni	41,314	942	2.3	19,598	1,627	8.3	20,753	698	3.4	16,462	372	2.3
Borjomi	37,437	3,946	10.5				32,422	3,124	9.6	25,214	2,176	8.6
Aspindza	32,644	1,741	5.3	11,265	2,068	18.4	13,010	2,273	17.5	10,372	1,381	13.3
TOTAL	306,401	116,266	37.9	220,772	126,418	57.3	228,487	124,831	54.6	160,504	81,089	50.5

== Politics ==
Tensions in Samtskhe–Javakheti have run high at times. One reason is based in the official Georgian language policy that does, officially, not allow the Armenian language to be used in public or administrative offices, even if citizen and officer speak better Armenian than Georgian. International monitoring missions on the situation of national minorities in Georgia have critically commented in this aspect as recently as 2009.

The ethnic Armenian United Javakhk Democratic Alliance calls on a local autonomy for Javakheti within Georgia.

Some Armenian political groupings of Armenia and the Armenian diaspora, among them most notably the Armenian Revolutionary Federation (ARF) claim that Javakhk (Armenian name for Javakheti) should belong to Armenia, United Armenia shall include all territories designated as Armenia by the Treaty of Sèvres as well as the regions of Artsakh (Nagorno-Karabakh), Javakhk (Armenian name for Javakheti), and Nakhchivan. However, Javakhk (Javakheti) is not officially claimed by the government of Armenia.

A small number of Turkish Meskhetians returned to Georgia in recent years. With little employment opportunities in the region, the re-migration caused tensions with the local Armenian population. In consequence, the Georgian authorities preferred to settle returning Turkish Meskhetians in other areas in the country.

The Baku–Tbilisi–Ceyhan oil pipeline and South Caucasus gas pipeline which passed through the region, has met opposition from local Armenians, as well as the planned Kars-Akhalkalaki-Baku railway.

== Notable people ==
- Jivani (1846–1909), gusan (bard) and poet, born in Kartsakh village
- Stepan Malkhasyants (1857–1947), academician, philologist, linguist, and lexicographer, born in Akhaltsikhe
- Hovhannes Katchaznouni (1868–1938), the first Prime Minister of Armenia from 1918 to 1919, born in Akhaltsikhe
- Derenik Demirchian (1877–1956), writer, born in Akhalkalaki
- Ruben Ter-Minasian (1882–1951), Defense Minister of Armenia in 1920, born in Akhalkalaki
- Hakob Kojoyan (1883–1959), prominent painter born in Akhaltsikhe
- Vahan Terian (1885–1920), prominent poet, born in Gandza village
- Gregorio Pietro Agagianian (1895–1971), Armenian Catholic Patriarch, Cardinal, papal candidate
- Gurgen Dalibaltayan (b. 1926), military commander, Colonel-General, born in Ninotsminda
- Karapet Chobanyan (1927–1978), scientist born in Karzakh village
- Lusine Zakaryan (1937–1991), soprano, born in Akhaltsikhe
- Harutyun Khachatryan (b. 1955), film director, founder of the Yerevan International Film Festival born in Akhalkalaki
- Levon Khechoyan (1955–2014), writer, born in Baraleti village
- Vagharshak Harutiunyan (b. 1956), Armenian Defence Minister from 1999 to 2000 born in Akhalkalaki

== See also ==
- Armenians in Georgia
  - Armenians in Tbilisi
  - Armenians in Abkhazia
