= United Javakhk Democratic Alliance =

- Leader: Vahagn Chakhalyan
- Founded: November 1991
- Headquarters: Akhalkalaki, Georgia
- Ideology: Autonomism; Separatism; Regionalism; Armenian nationalism

Party flag

Location of Samtskhe–Javakheti within Georgia

The United Javakhk Democratic Alliance (Armenian: Միացյալ Ջավախք ժողովրդավարական դաշինք, romanized: Miats’yal Javakhk’ Zhoghovrdavarakan dashink’) is a non-government organization composed of ethnic Armenians living in the Samtskhe-Javakheti region of Georgia. It has, at various times, called for local autonomy of the predominantly ethnic Armenian area of Javakheti known in Armenian as Javakhk, whence the organization's name. Its current leader is Vahagn Chakhalyan.

== History ==
After Russians withdrew from the military base at Akhalkalaki (the Russian presence was considered by the local Armenians as their protection against the abuses by the Georgian authorities), some political parties in Armenia and the Armenian diaspora advocated for an outright annexation of Javakhk by Armenia. Some Armenian political groupings of Armenia and the diaspora, among them most notably the Armenian Revolutionary Federation (ARF) claim that Javakhk, as well as the regions of Artsakh (Nagorno-Karabakh) and Nakhchivan belong to Armenia. However, Javakhk (Javakheti) is not officially claimed by the government of Armenia.

The movement has often pursued contradictory policy, alternating between a confrontational stance with the central Georgian government with more conciliatory rhetoric. It has its origin in the Javakhk movement which emerged in 1988 and was instrumental in organizing the deployment of a small unit of Javakheti Armenians to the conflict with Azerbaijan over Nagorno-Karabakh. Javakhk has lobbied for the creation of an Armenian autonomous region within Georgia, and organized protests against the centrally proposed local administrators and Georgian military exercises early in the 1990s. During the civil strife in Tbilisi early in 1991, the Javakhk exploited the constitutional vacuum and organized the Provisional Council of Representatives which self-dissolved after the local officials proposed by Tbilisi were finally accepted in November 1991.

The organization proposed to hold a referendum on autonomy or secession of Javakheti, but the Armenian government, mindful of the importance of its relations with Georgia, has been careful to defuse potential problems in the region, intervening once to talk Javakhk out of plans to hold a referendum on autonomy or secession. Both the Georgian and Armenian governments have pursued a careful and calming policy in regard with local nationalist movements that helped ease tensions in the region.

== See also ==
- Armenians in Samtskhe-Javakheti
- Armenians in Georgia
- List of active separatist movements in Europe
- List of Armenian ethnic enclaves
