= Armenia–Georgia relations =

- Georgia: Armenia

Diplomatic mission
- Embassy of Georgia, Yerevan: Embassy of Armenia, Tbilisi

Foreign relations exist between Armenia and Georgia. Both countries were former Soviet republics of the Soviet Union. Relations between the two were originally tense for a while after their independence, which included multiple occurrences of voting against each other at the United Nations. However in recent years, relations between the two have vastly improved and modern relations are now seen as friendly. Both countries are members of the Council of Europe, the European Political Community, and the EU's Eastern Partnership and Euronest Parliamentary Assembly.

Relations with Georgia are of particular importance for Armenia because under the border blockades imposed against Armenia by Turkey and Azerbaijan due to the Nagorno-Karabakh conflict, Georgia offers Armenia its only land connection with Europe, with access to its Black Sea ports. However, because of Armenia's reliance on Russia and Georgia, both of which fought in the 2008 South Ossetia War and thus severed diplomatic and economic relations, 70% of Armenia's imports entered via Georgia, especially from Russia, which has imposed an economic blockade on Georgia.

The Javakheti region in southern Georgia contains a large Armenian population and although there have been local civic organizations pushing for autonomy, such as United Javakhk, there has been no violence between Armenians and Georgians in the area since the Georgian–Armenian War ended in 1919. Since independence, Georgian clergy have occupied the Armenian churches, and Armenians in Georgia and Armenia have demonstrated against their destruction. On November 28, 2008, Armenian demonstrators in front of the Georgian embassy in Armenia demanded that the Georgian government immediately cease encroachments on the Armenian churches and punish those guilty, calling the Georgian party's actions White genocide. Some Armenians believe they are victims of a policy to shift the Samtskhe–Javakheti region's demographic balance since a number of Georgian families were settled there. Armenians are also underrepresented in the government, which leads to the perception of discrimination and mutual distrust. There were several protests, some of them turning violent after clashes with law enforcement agents.

Georgia supported Azerbaijan against Armenia in United Nations General Assembly Resolution 62/243, and Armenia has voted against several United Nations resolutions on Abkhazia that reiterate the right of return of all displaced persons and refugees to Georgia's breakaway regions. Despite the stated differences and conflicting interests, bilateral relations between both countries are stable and developing. In 2019, Armenia broke with Russia on a vote about the right of Georgians to return to their homes in Abkhazia and South Ossetia. During a UN resolution held on 4 June, Armenia did not vote against Georgia in regards to the return of displaced people. The move was hailed as a sign of Armenia's attempt to strengthen relations with Georgia. In June 2024, Armenia again supported Georgia by voting in favour of a UN resolution calling for the right to return of Georgians to Abkhazia and South Ossetia. The Armenian vote was heralded a "historic moment" by Georgian media.

== Minorities ==
There are nearly 168,102 Armenians in Georgia, among them 81,089 living in Samtskhe–Javakheti region and 53,409 in Tbilisi. The Georgian minority in Armenia stands at 974 according to the 2011 census in Armenia.

== Country comparison ==
	Armenia	Georgia
Coat of arms		
Population	3,018,854	3,713,804
Area	29,743 km^{2} (11,484sq mi)	69,700 km^{2} (26,900sq mi)
Population Density	108.4/km^{2} (280.7/sq mi)	53.5/km^{2} (138.6/sq mi)
Capital	Yerevan	Tbilisi
Largest City	Yerevan – 1,121,900 (1,230,000 Metro)	Tbilisi – 1,171,100 (1,485,293 Metro)
Government	Unitary parliamentary republic	Unitary parliamentary constitutional republic
Official languages	Armenian	Georgian Abkhazian
Current Leader	President Vahagn Khachaturyan; Prime Minister Nikol Pashinyan	President Mikheil Kavelashvili; Prime Minister Irakli Kobakhidze
Main religions	92.5% Armenian Apostolic Church, 2.3% other Christian, 0.8% Yazidism, 4.4% None/Other	83.4% Eastern Orthodoxy, Georgian Orthodox Church, 10.7% Islam, 3.9% Armenian Apostolic Church, 0.8% Roman Catholic Church, 1.2% None/Other
Ethnic groups	98.1% Armenians, 1.2% Yazidis, 0.4% Russians, 0.3% other	86.8% Georgians, 6.2% Azerbaijanis, 4.5% Armenians, 0.7% Russians, 2.1% other
GDP (nominal)	US$25.4 billion ($8,575 per capita)	US$33 billion ($8,825 per capita)
GDP (PPP)	$64.4 billion ($21,746 per capita)	$94 billion ($24,348 per capita)

== History ==
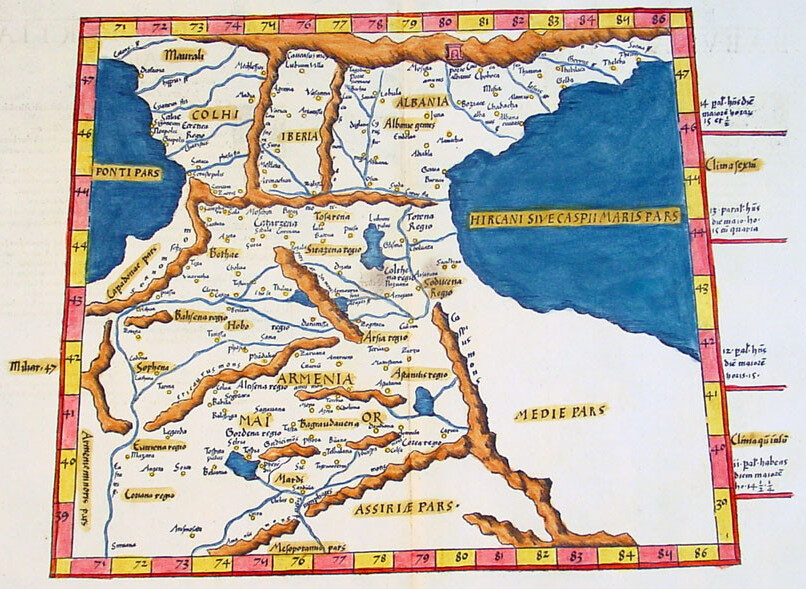
Armenia, Colchis, Iberia, Albania

Armenia and Georgia have a long history of cultural and political relations. The interaction peaked in the Middle Ages when both nations engaged in prolific cultural dialogue and allied themselves against the neighboring Muslim empires. There were frequent intermarriages between Armenian and Georgian royal and noble families, and both ethnicities intermingled in several border areas.

=== The Roman conquest ===
The Caucasus region in the 1st century BC

This close association with Armenia brought upon the country an invasion (65 BC ) by the Roman general Pompey, who was then at war with Mithradates VI of Pontus, and Armenia; but Rome did not establish her power permanently over Iberia. Nineteen years later, the Romans again marched (36 BC) on Iberia forcing King Pharnavaz II to join their campaign against Albania. During this time Armenia and Pontus were actively expanding at the expense of Rome, taking over its Eastern Mediterranean possessions. However, the success of the anti-Roman alliance did not last long. As a result of the brilliant Roman campaigns of Pompey and Lucullus from the west, and the Parthian invasion from the south, Armenia lost a significant part of its conquests by 65 BC, devolving into a Roman-Parthian dependency. At the same time, the Kingdom of Pontus was completely destroyed by the Romans and all its territory including Colchis were incorporated into the Roman Empire as her provinces.

The former Kingdom of Colchis became the Roman province of Lazicum ruled by Roman legati. The following 600 years of Georgian history were marked by the struggle between Rome and Persia (Iran) including Parthians and Sassanids who were fighting long wars against each other for the domination in the Middle East including Syria, Mesopotamia, Armenia, Albania, and Iberia.

In the late 4th century, Rome had to give up Albania and most of Armenia to Sassanid Persia. The province of Lazicum was given a degree of autonomy that by the end of the century developed into full independence with the formation of a new Kingdom of Lazica-Egrisi on the territories of smaller principalities of the Zans, Svans, Apsyls, and Sanyghs. This new Western Georgian state survived more than 250 years until 562 when it was absorbed by the Byzantine Empire.

While the Georgian kingdom of Colchis was administered as a Roman province, Caucasian Iberia freely accepted the Roman Imperial protection. A stone inscription discovered at Mtskheta speaks of the 1st-century ruler Mihdrat I (AD 58–106) as "the friend of the Caesars" and the king "of the Roman-loving Iberians." Emperor Vespasian fortified the ancient Mtskheta site of Arzami for the Iberian kings in 75 AD.

In the 2nd century AD, Iberia strengthened her position in the area, especially during the reign of King Pharsman II who achieved full independence from Rome and reconquered some of the previously lost territories from declining Armenia.

In the 3rd century AD, the Lazi tribe came to dominate most of Colchis, establishing the kingdom of Lazica, locally known as Egrisi. Colchis was a scene of the protracted rivalry between the Eastern Roman/Byzantine and Sassanid empires, culminating in the Lazic War from 542 to 562.

=== Early Middle Ages ===
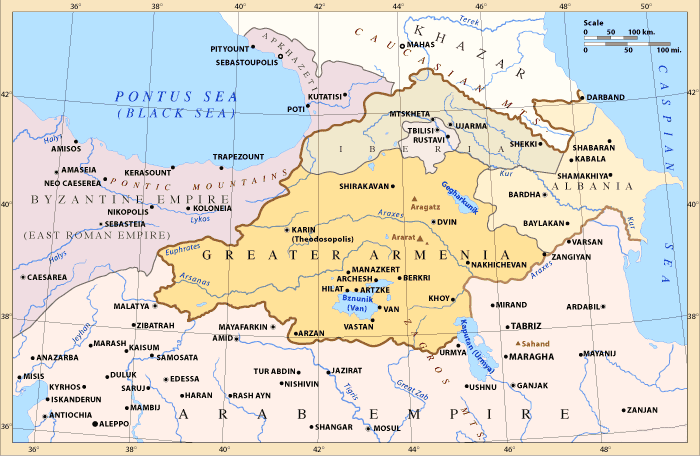
The Caucasus region in the 8th and 9th centuries

With their status of "King of Kings" (Shahanshah), Armenian kings authority also carried over to the neighboring states of Georgia, Caucasian Albania and several of the Arab emirates.

=== Middle Ages ===
The second half of the 11th century was marked by the strategically significant invasion of the Seljuq Turks, who by the end of the 1040s had succeeded in building a vast nomadic empire including most of Central Asia and Persia. In 1071, the Seljuq army destroyed the united Byzantine and Georgian forces in the Battle of Manzikert. By 1081, all of Armenia, Anatolia, Mesopotamia, Syria, and most of Georgia had been conquered and devastated by the Seljuqs. By the end of the 1080s, Georgians were outnumbered in the region by the invaders. The defeat of the Bagratuni dynasty ended Christian leadership of Armenia for the next millennium.

The Caucasus region in the 12th century

The struggle against the Seljuq invaders in Georgia was led by the young King David IV Bagrationi (reigning 1089–1125). Georgians freed Shirvan and a large portion of Armenia. Thus in 1124 David also became the King of Armenians, incorporating Northern Armenia into the lands of the Georgian Crown. In 1125 King David died, leaving Georgia with the status of strong regional power.

The temporary fall of the Byzantine Empire in 1204 to the Crusaders left Georgia as the strongest Christian state in the whole East Mediterranean area. Muslim power in Greater Armenia was seriously troubled by the resurgent Georgian monarchy. Many local nobles (nakharars) joined their efforts with the Georgians, leading to liberation of several areas in northern Armenia, which was ruled, under the authority of the Georgian crown, by the Mkhargrdzeli, a prominent Armeno-Georgian noble family.

==== Mongol invasions ====
The kingdom of Georgia flourished during the 10th to 12th centuries, and fell to the Mongol invasions of Georgia by 1243, and after a brief reunion under George V of Georgia to the Timurid Empire.

==== Ottoman and Persian domination ====
By 1490, Georgia was fragmented into a number of petty kingdoms and principalities, which throughout the Early Modern period struggled to maintain their autonomy against Iranian (successive Safavid, Afsharid and Qajar dynasties) and Ottoman domination until Georgia was finally annexed by the Russian Empire in 1801. Russian possession over Georgia got nominally finalised with Qajar Iran in 1813 in the Treaty of Gulistan following Russia's victory in the Russo-Persian War (1804-1813). Greater Armenia was from the early 16th century up to including the course of the 19th century was also, more dominantly even, divided between the rivalling neighboring Ottoman and successive Iranian dynasties. In the first half of the 19th century, after several centuries under its rule in the early modern era, Iran was forced to cede its last remaining territories in the Caucasus which included modern-day Armenia (also known as Eastern Armenia) to Imperial Russia following its loss in the Russo-Persian War (1826-1828), which got ratified in the 1828 Treaty of Turkmenchay. Greater Armenia was now divided between the Ottoman Empire and Russia.

=== Provinces of the Russian Empire ===
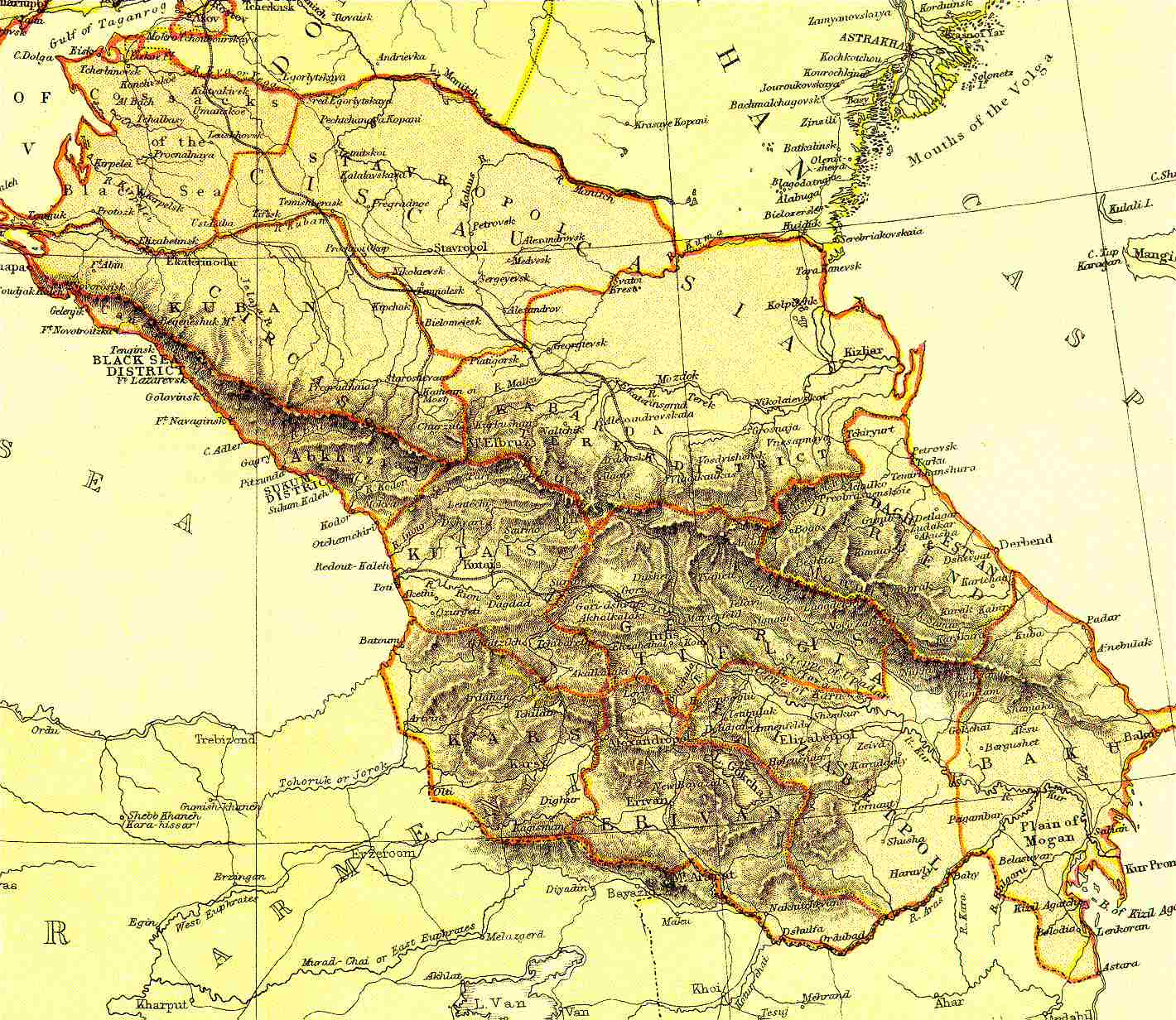
Russian Transcaucasia immediately prior to the formation of the Transcaucasian Federation (1917)

.

=== Transcaucasian Federation (1917–1918) ===
During the Russian Revolution, the provinces of the Caucasus seceded and formed their own federal state called the Transcaucasian Federation. Competing national interests and the war with the Ottoman Empire led to the dissolution of the republic half a year later, in April 1918.

=== Georgian–Armenian War (1918) ===
During the final stages of World War I, the Armenians and Georgians had been defending against the advance of the Ottoman Empire. In June 1918, in order to forestall an Ottoman advance on Tiflis, the Georgian troops had occupied former districts of Tiflis Governorate, the Lori Province which at the time had a 97% Armenian majority. After the Armistice of Mudros and the withdrawal of the Ottomans, the Georgian forces remained. Georgian Menshevik parliamentarian Irakli Tsereteli offered that the Armenians would be safer from the Turks as Georgian citizens. The Georgians offered a quadripartite conference including Georgia, Armenia, Azerbaijan, and the Mountainous Republic of the Northern Caucasus in order to resolve the issue which the Armenians rejected. In December 1918, the Georgians were confronting a rebellion chiefly in the village of Uzunlar in the Lori region. Within days, hostilities commenced between the two republics.

The Georgian–Armenian War was a border war fought in 1918 between the Democratic Republic of Georgia and the Democratic Republic of Armenia over the parts of then disputed province of Lori.

=== As Soviet republics ===
==== Transcaucasian SFSR (1922–1936) ====
From March 12, 1922, to December 5, 1936, Armenia and Georgia were a part of the Transcaucasian SFSR together with the Azerbaijan SSR. In 1936, the TSFSR was dissolved under Stalin's orders and the socialist republics of Armenia, Azerbaijan, and Georgia were established instead.

==== Armenian SSR and Georgian SSR (1936–1991) ====
In the Soviet Union, Armenians and Georgians, along with Russians, Ukrainians, Belarusians, Germans, and Jews were judged as "advanced" peoples, and were grouped together as Western nationalities.

Nevertheless, as with various other ethnic minorities who lived in the Soviet Union under Stalin, tens of thousands of Armenians were executed and deported. In 1936, Lavrenty Beria and Stalin worked to deport Armenians to Siberia in an attempt to bring Armenia's population under 700,000 in order to justify an annexation into Georgia. Thousands of Armenians were forcibly exiled to Altai Krai in 1949.

Flag of Transcaucasian SFSR

Flag of Georgian SSR

Flag of Armenian SSR

=== As independent states ===
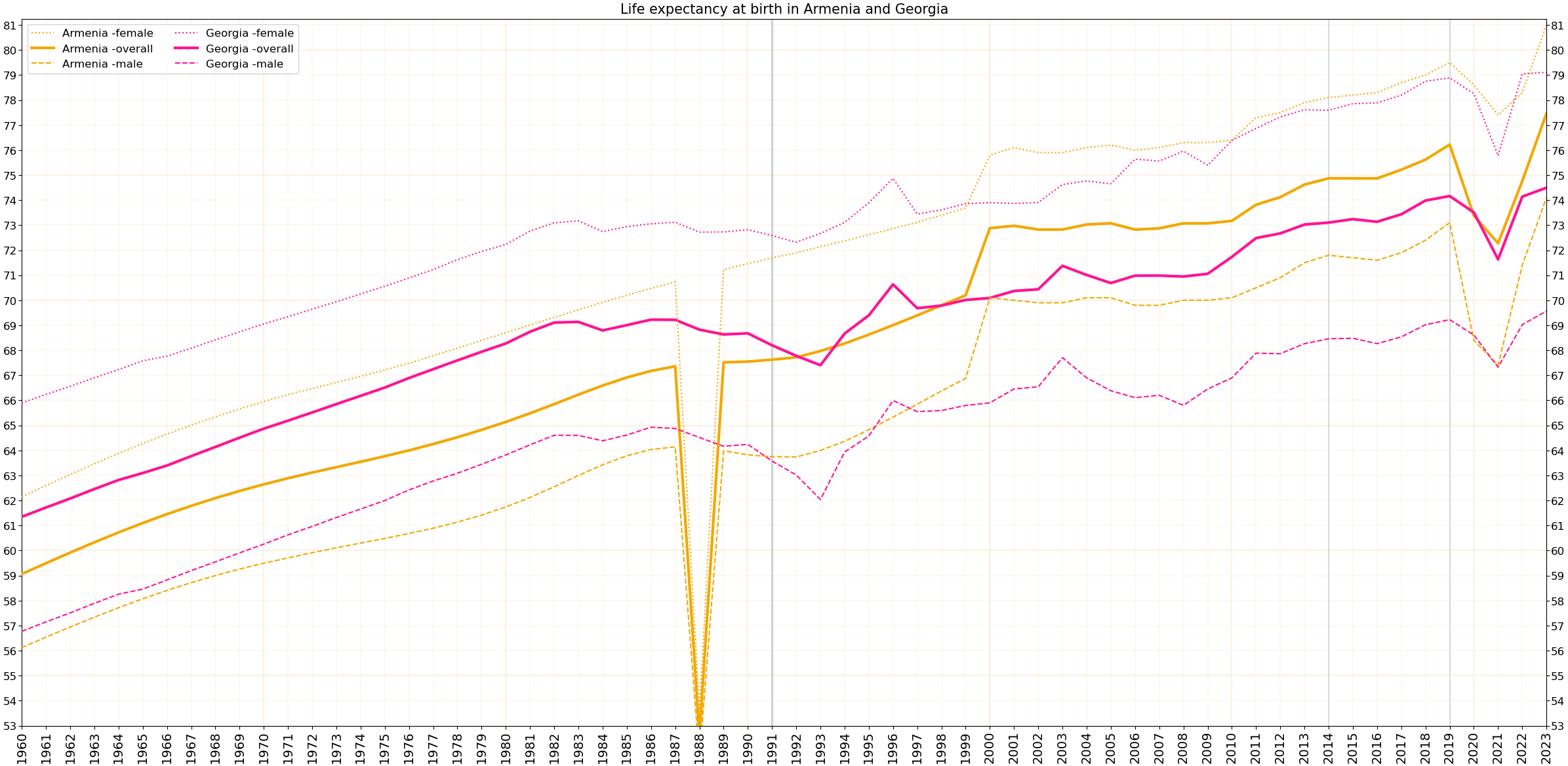
Comparison of life expectancy in Armenia and Georgia

On March 17, 1991, Armenia, along with the Baltics, Georgia and Moldova, boycotted a union-wide referendum in which 78% of all voters voted for the retention of the Soviet Union in a reformed form.

Georgia declared independence on 9 April 1991 and Armenia did the same on 21 September 1991 following the failed Soviet coup attempt in August. The United States recognized the independence of both nations on December 25, 1991.

Armenian-Georgian relations in the post-independence period have been mixed but cooperative. The two states are both allied with the other one's adversaries (Armenia with Russia, Georgia with Azerbaijan and Turkey), but they are nevertheless obliged to maintain cooperative ties: the border blockades imposed by Turkey and Azerbaijan on Armenia makes Georgia (and, via a single route, Iran) the only possible exit and entry point for Armenian imports and exports.

Recent revelations indicate that Yerevan had taken steps to assure Tbilisi that it had Armenia's all-but-official support in the outbreak of the 2008 South Ossetian and Abkhazian conflict. Armenia offered itself as a safe haven for Georgians escaping the conflict, and at one point, temporarily housed at least 500 Georgian families escaping the war. To this day, Armenia has not recognized South Ossetia and Abkhazia as independent states. However, the establishment of diplomatic relations between Abkhazia, South Ossetia, and the separatist Republic of Artsakh has drawn criticism from the Georgian government, notably during President Salome Zourabichvili's visit to Armenia in March 2019. Moreover, the Armenian Apostolic Church's decision to place Armenian churches in Abkhazia under the jurisdiction of its South Russian Eparchy instead of the Church's Eparchy of Georgia was rescinded after a meeting between President Zourabichvili and Catholicos Karekin II.

According to Wikileaks, however, Armenia's foreign diplomats grew increasingly frustrated with Tbilisi's inability to respond to calls or diplomatic cables from Yerevan. Despite their reluctance to warmly embrace each other diplomatically, the differences between the two nations are more often highlighted by political rather than social or historical differences.

Positive steps have been taken to strengthen ties between the two nations. In January 2011, Georgian President Mikhail Saakashvilli paid an official visit to Armenia immediately after his initial visit to Washington. Both the Georgian and Armenian presidents seem to hold each other in high esteem, and Georgia's push to remove itself from the Russian sphere of influence in the Caucasus Region has translated to an increase of cooperation, positivity and productivity in relations with its immediate neighbors. Tbilisi recently made an effort to address the socioeconomic plight of the Georgian-Armenians living in Javakheti, a source of tension between the two nations, by building a main road that connects the region with Tbilisi as well as proposing new projects in the region, one of which involves the creation of a national park.

On 26 January 2024, Armenian prime minister Nikol Pashinyan congratulated Georgia for obtaining EU candidate status. "This is a historic event for Georgia and the entire region", Pashinyan said at a joint press conference held with his counterpart in Tbilisi.

== Diplomacy ==
Armenia

- Tbilisi (Embassy)
- Batumi (Consulate-General)

Georgia

- Yerevan (Embassy)

== See also ==
- Armenia–Georgia border
- Anti-Armenian sentiment in Georgia
- Armenians in Georgia
- Georgians in Armenia
- Eastern Partnership
- Euronest Parliamentary Assembly
- EU Strategy for the South Caucasus
- Armenia–European Union relations
  - Accession of Armenia to the European Union
- Georgia–European Union relations
  - Accession of Georgia to the European Union
- Armenia–NATO relations
- Georgia–NATO relations
