= Ashough Jivani's House-Museum =

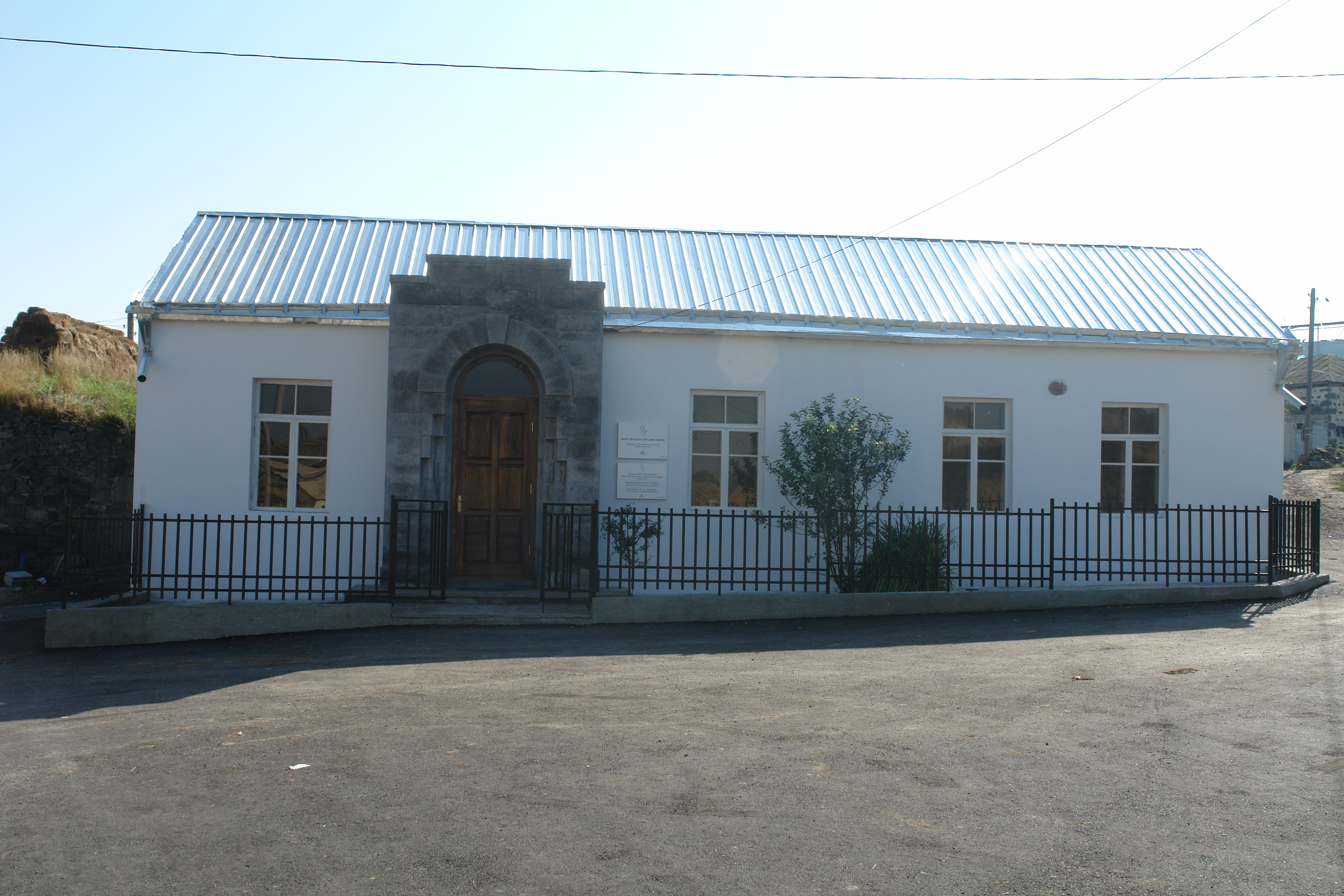
- Exterior view
- Established: 2016
- Location: Kartsakhi, Akhalkalaki Municipality, Samtskhe–Javakheti, Georgia
- Coordinates: 41°14′45″N 43°16′44″E
- Type: Biographical museum

Ashough Jivani's House-Museum (Armenian: Աշուղ Ջիվանու տուն-թանգարան), Ashough Jivani's House-Museum in his native Kartsakhi village in Georgia. It was founded with the support of Javakheti Foundation in 2016. The opening ceremony took place in the framework of Jivani Day celebrations.

== History ==
A committee was formed in 2014 to oversee the establishment of the house museum. The architectural and construction projects of the house-museum were designed by a group of relevant specialists led by RA honorable architect Hovhaness Mutafyan, who also implemented measurement and interior designs, exhibit placement, and other works. The museum's opening ceremony took place in July 2015 as part of the Jivani Day celebrations. The museum opened on August 27, 2016, as part of the Jivani Day celebrations.

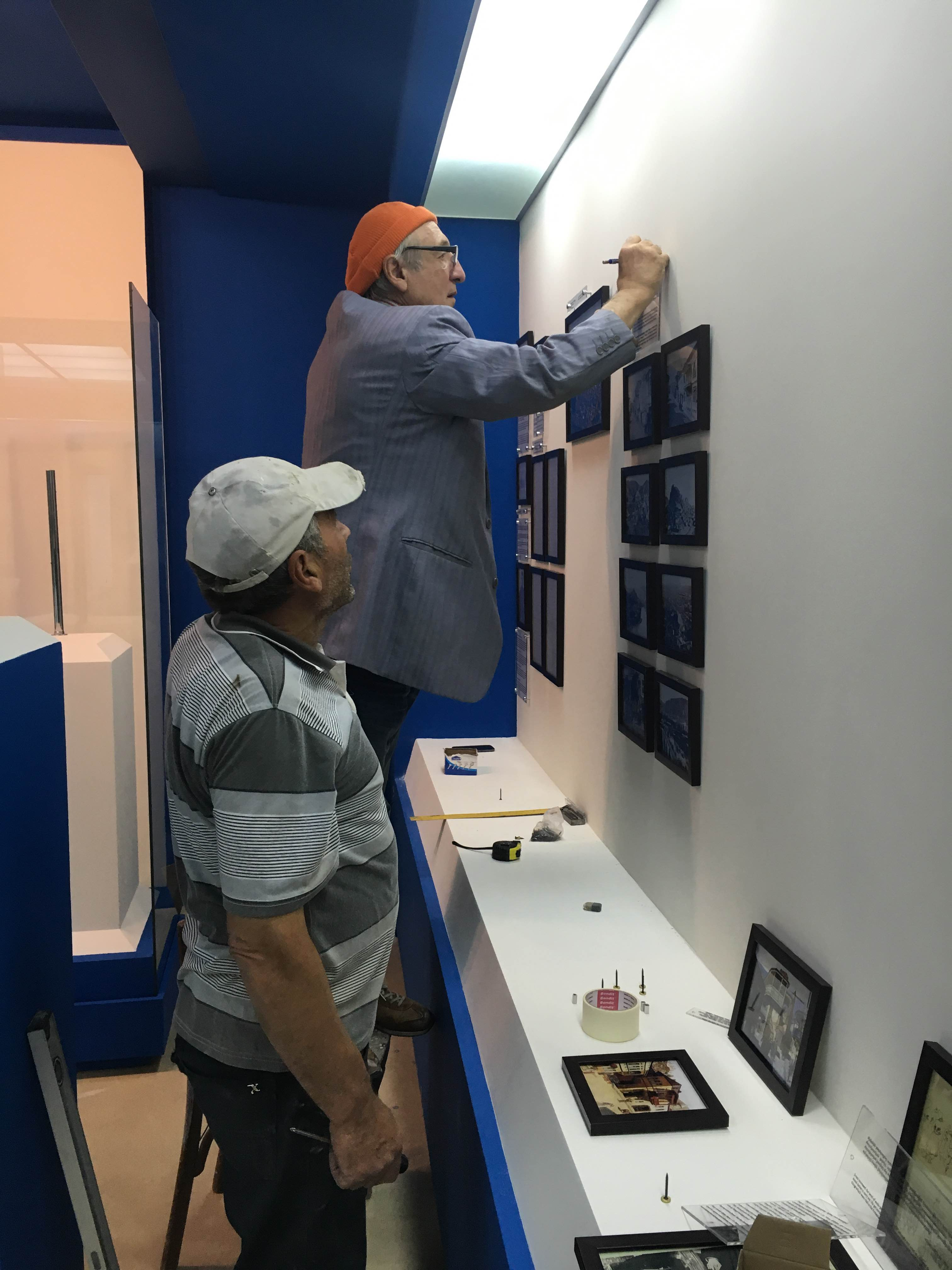

During the construction work the yard, fences and roads of the house-museum were improved. Jivani House-Museum has enlivened the village life in Kartsakhi. It promoted the flow of tourists to Kartsakhi and due to its cultural events, has changed the overall atmosphere and mood of the village.

== Collection ==
The members of the working group formed in Gyumri include music expert Hasmik Harutyunyan, museum experts Paruyr Zakaryan, Stepan Ter-Margaryan, Susanna Mnatsakanyan, and many others who assisted in the collection, processing and classification of the museum materials. To replenish the house-museum fund, the materials of the Jivani fund, from which separate manuscripts are displayed in the exhibition hall of the Literature and Art Museum named after Yeghishe Charents, have been digitized. Apart from the manuscripts, Jivani's and many other books about him, articles, and nearly all publications of Jivani's songs and fairy tales from 1882 (date of the first book's publication) to the present day have been collected.

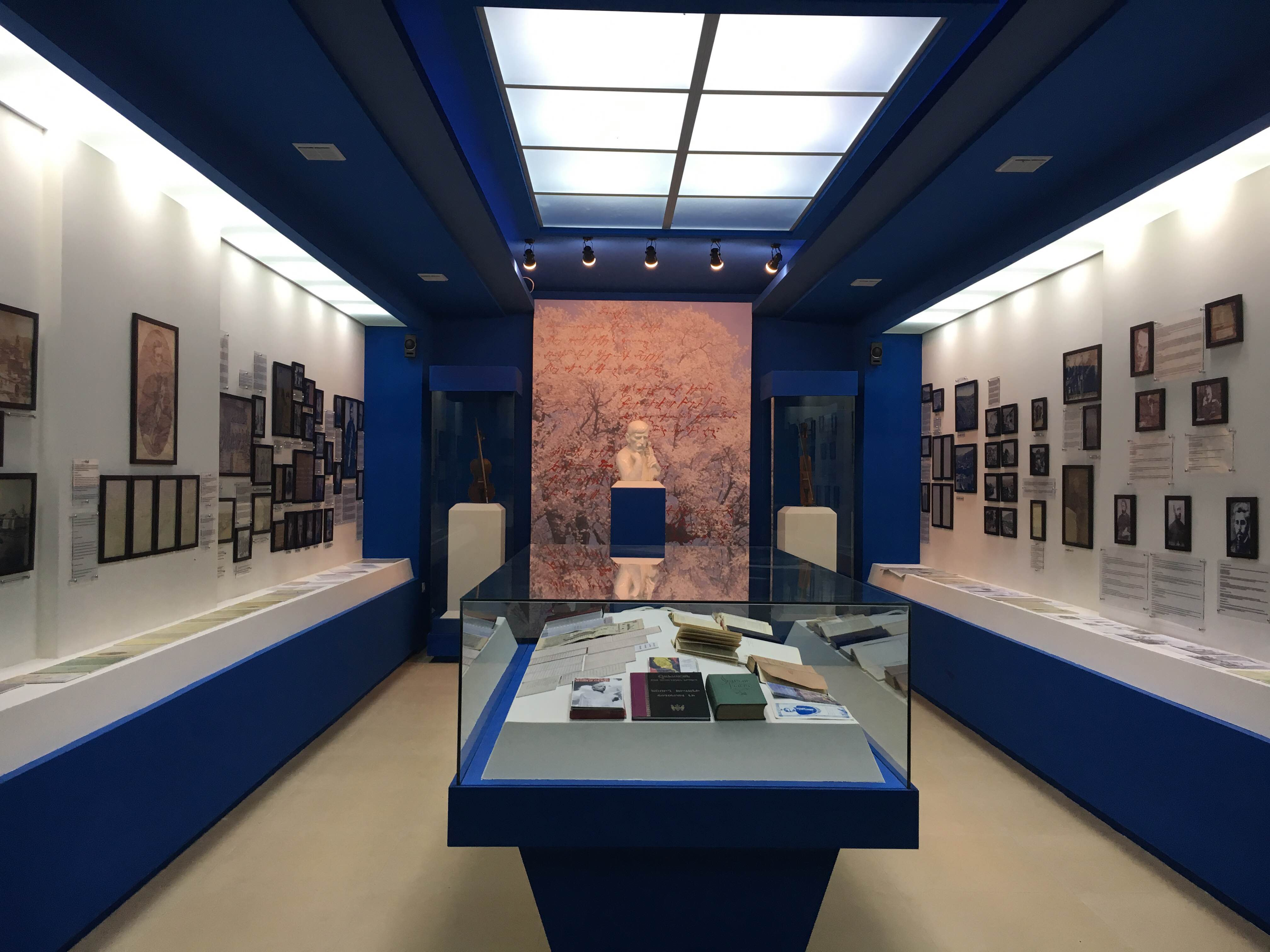

Materials dedicated to Jivani song national celebrations taking place since 1984 in Javakheti (officially since 1985) are exhibited in a separate section, as well as copies of various newspapers dedicated to Jivani. The walls of the house-museum exhibition hall are decorated with photographs depicting Jivani's childhood and his children, as well as various objects related to his life in the Alexandrapol (Gyumri) and Tbilisi regions. Also shown are photos, posters, thoughts, Talyan’s and Jivani’s dynasty tree. Jivani's daughter, Hripsime's grandson, Jivan Hakobyan, Gagik Varderesyan and others have contributed to the development of the collection.

In the central part of the exhibition hall is Jivani's bust. Displayed on the right side of the bust is his violin and on the left side his kamani. As a symbol of Jivani’s immortal song ("I am a tree of apricot") and the Armenian nation's eternity the wall behind the bust is covered with images of apricots, over which Jivani's "Hovik" song quartet is written in his handwriting.

There are photographs of Armenian and foreign celebrities, who valued Jivani or are closely connected with the ashough in their life and work. The performers who sung or played Ashough’s music are also included in the exhibition. The exhibition ends with photographs of Jivani’s tombstone and the pictures of ashough school (founded in Yerevan, 1997), streets and monuments.

== Memorial section ==
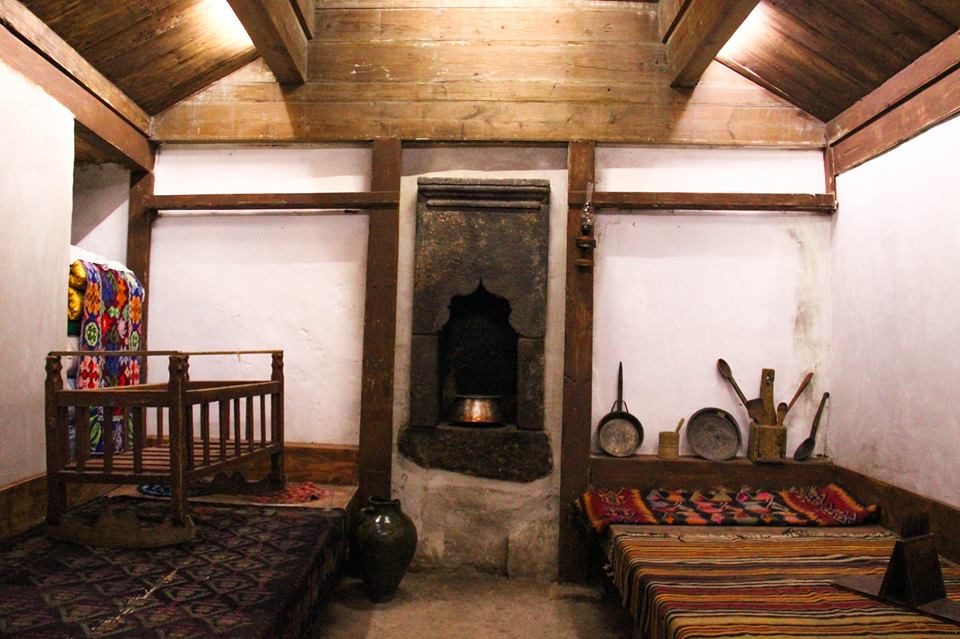

Support to Javakheti Foundation opened the memorial section of the house-museum on August 27, 2017. Jivani spent his early years in this section of the house-museum. The memorial section was restored while preserving the characteristics of the region's traditional houses from the nineteenth and twentieth centuries. It was restocked with period household items collected from Kartsakhi and surrounding villages. A team has been involved in the reconstruction of the memorial section thanks to the efforts of the executive board of the "Support to Javakheti" Foundation. The members included: the author of the house-Museum's architectural-construction projects, RA Hovhannes Mutafyan, an ethnographic expert on ethnographic content and museum exhibition organization, Argam Yeranosyan, an ethnographer and museum expert, and culturologist Narine Yeghikyan, who worked on the development and restoration of the objects. Mitya Galoyan, a general construction engineer, oversaw the museum's construction with his team.
