= Tsunda Church =

Church in Georgia (country)

Tsunda Church წუნდის წმინდა იოანე ნათლისმცემლის ეკლესია (in Georgian)
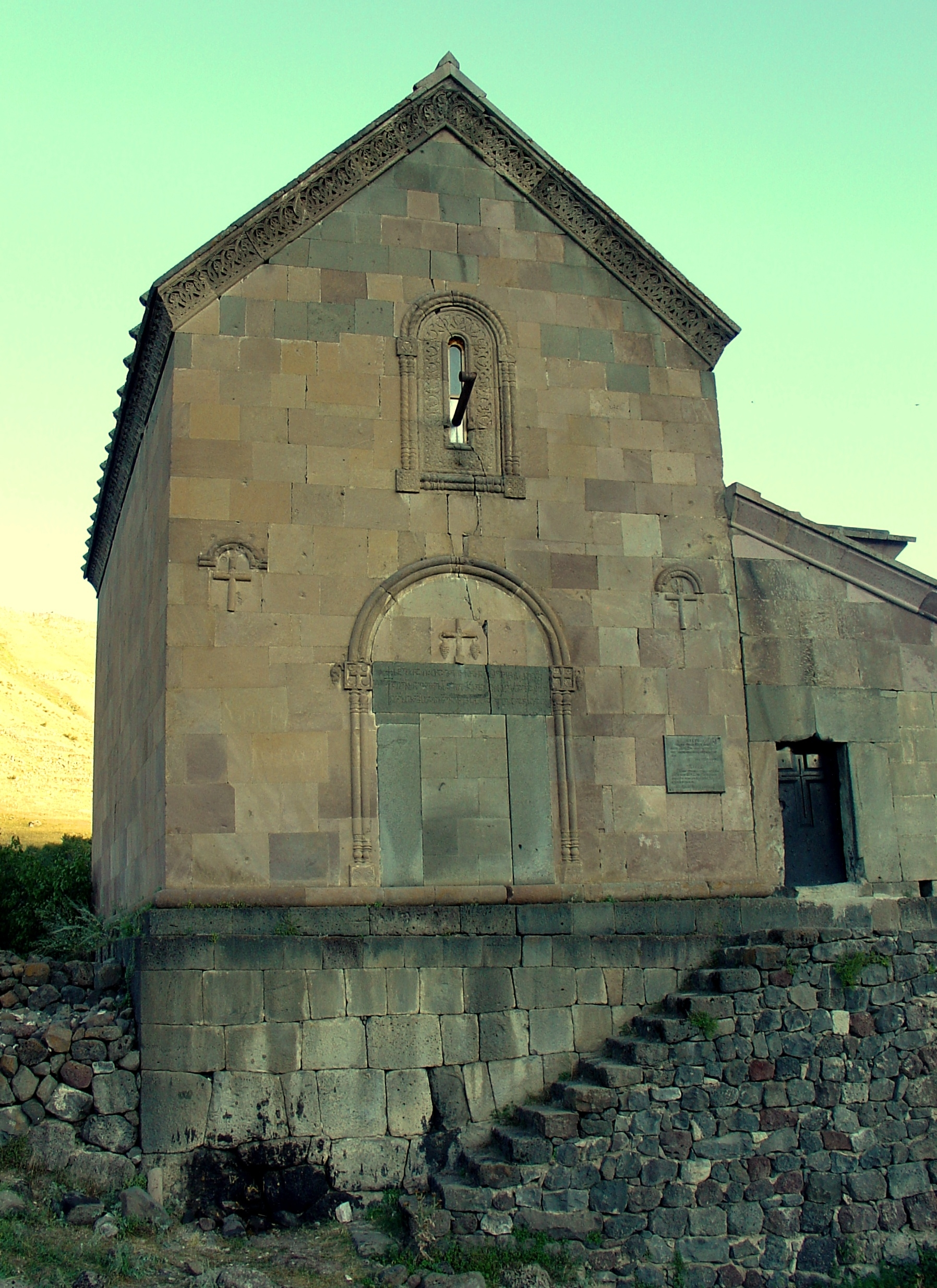
- Tsunda church

- Location within Samtskhe-Javakheti Location within Georgia

Religion
- Affiliation: Georgian Orthodox
- Province: Samtskhe–Javakheti

Location
- Location: (Georgia (country)) Aspindza Municipality, Samtskhe–Javakheti, Georgia
- Interactive map of Tsunda Church წუნდის წმინდა იოანე ნათლისმცემლის ეკლესია (in Georgian)
- Coordinates: 41°24′28″N 43°20′04″E

Architecture
- Type: Church
- Completed: 12th-13th century

Tsunda Church (Georgian: წუნდის ეკლესია, romanized: ts'undis ek'lesia) is a church in Tsunda, near Tmogvi fortress in the Samtskhe–Javakheti region of Georgia.

== History ==
Tsunda Church, dedicated to St John the Baptist, dates back to the 12th-13th centuries. In this vicinity, there are natural hot water springs and terraced gardens. The church stands on the site of the ancient city Tsunda.

The hall church was erected on the top of a high rock by Ichkit Gurgenisdze, as it is written above the western entrance. Its basement contains a crypta. The decorations are rather poor, except the door and window frames. The portal with reliefs was added some time after the church construction.

As common for such churches the vault is of barrel-chamber type, and the apse with conch is in the eastern part of the interior. Original frescoes are nearly destroyed.

== Gallery ==
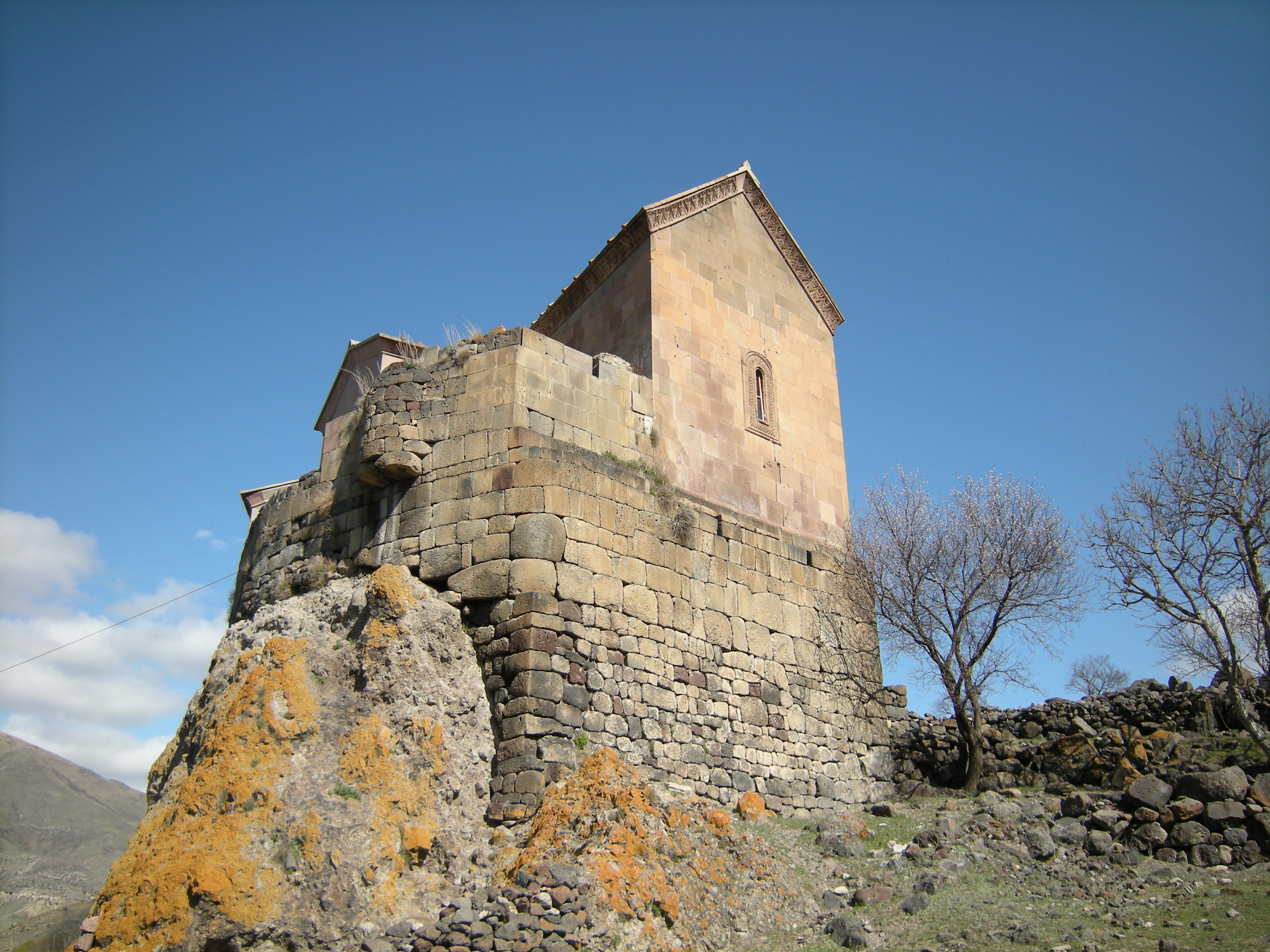

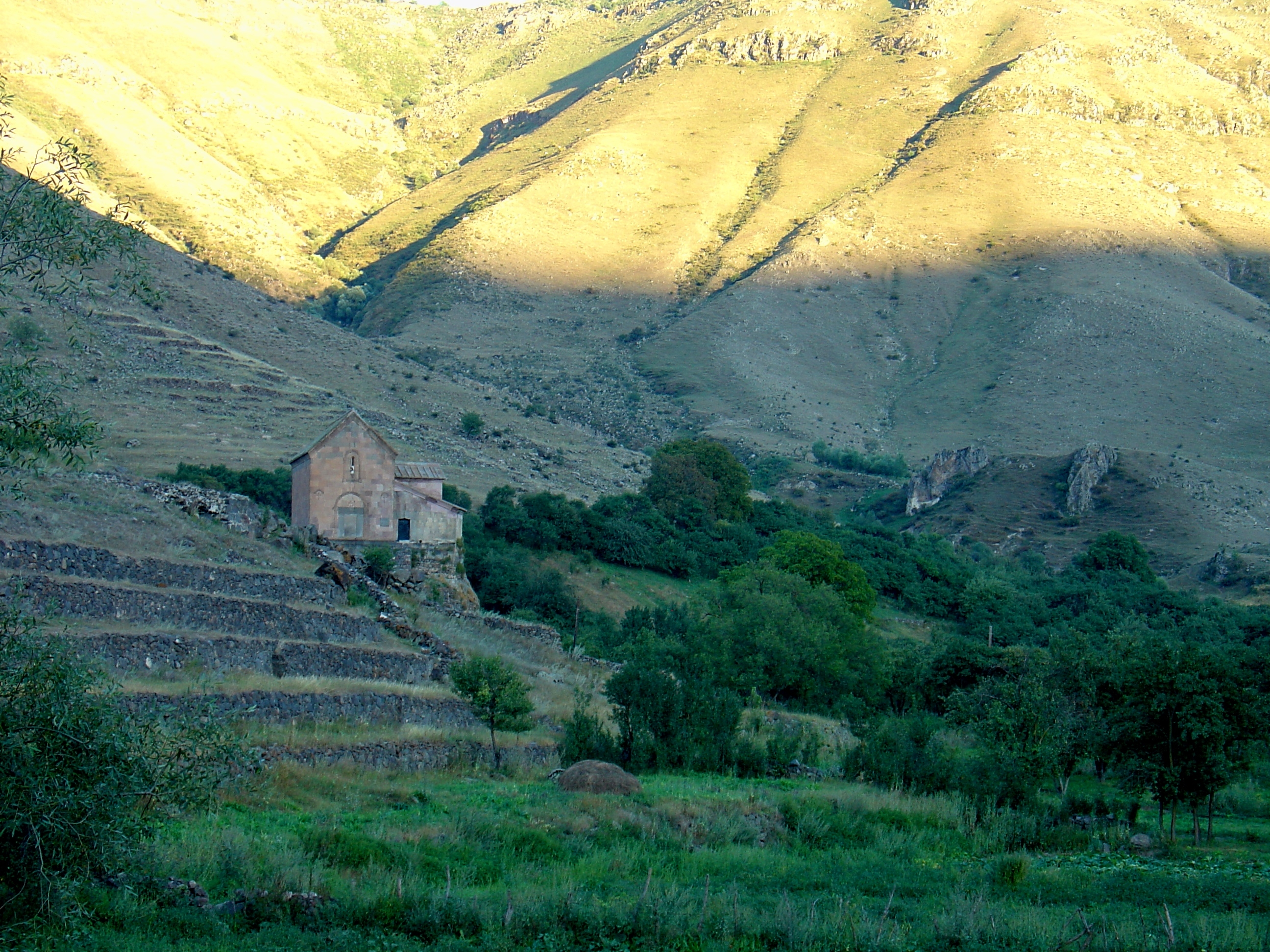

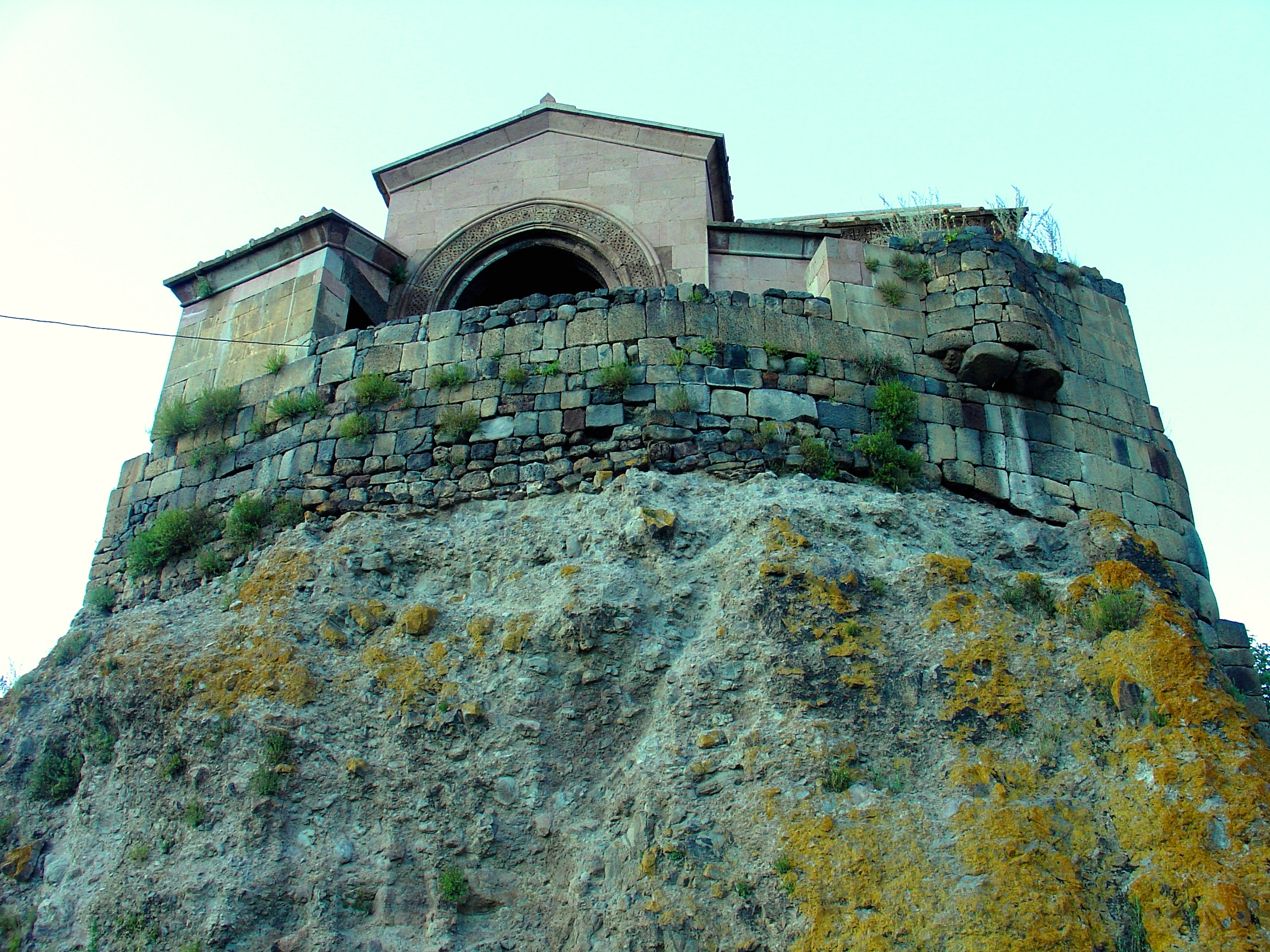
