= Khojaminasishvili =

Coat of arms of Princes Khojaminasishvili

The House of Khojaminasishvili (Georgian: ხოჯამინასიშვილი) was a Georgian family of Armenian ethnic background ennobled in the Kingdom of Kartli-Kakheti in 1775. Their status received confirmation in 1857 from the Russian Empire, where they were known as Khodzhaminasov (Russian: Ходжаминасов).

== History ==
The family, claiming descent from the medieval Armenian house of Shahapuni and known for their merchandise, were originally from Julfa and resettled, in the person of Tarkhan Khoja-Minasi, to Tbilisi in the reign of Heraclius II of Kartli-Kakheti and received from that monarch the title of prince (tavadi) in 1775. After the annexation of Georgia by the Russian Empire, the Khojaminasishvili (Khodzhaminasov) were confirmed in their princely rank (knyaz) in 1857.
