= Tsunda =

Historic city

- Georgian: წუნდა
- Aspindza Municipality, Samtskhe-Javakheti, Georgia

Site information
- Condition: Ruined

Location
- Coordinates: 41°24′19″N 43°19′46″E

Site history
- Built: 5th century

Tsunda (Georgian: წუნდა) is an ancient city, administrative and religious center of the historical province Javakheti in Georgia. The city is mentioned in the chronicles. Tsunda served as the summer residence of kings and was the seat of the bishop in the end of the 5th century. No ancient remnant present. The only buildings include the Tsunda Church of the 12-13th century and the 19th century caravanserai. After the decline of Tsunda, new feudal city-fortress Tmogvi grew on the opposite, left bank of Mtkvari River.

== See also ==
- Tmogvi
- Tsunda Church
