= Javakhians =

Javakhians Georgian: ჯავახი Javakhi
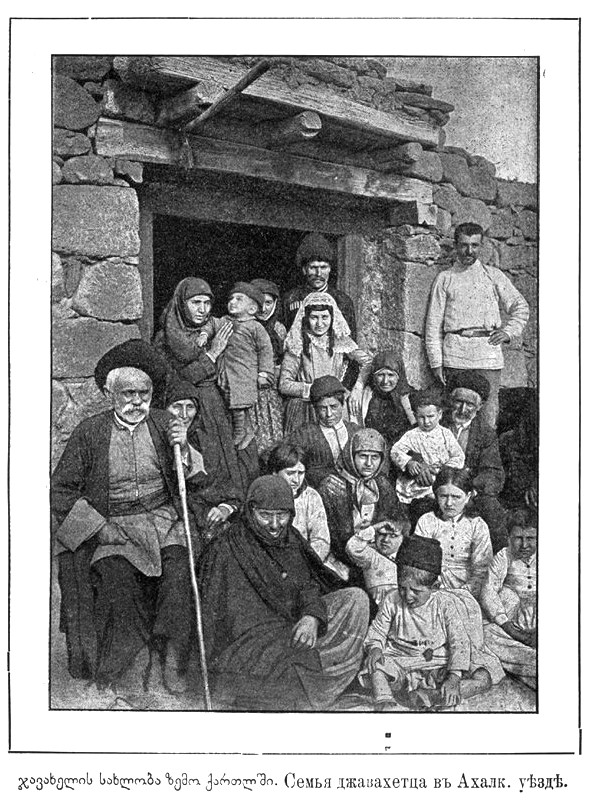
- Javakhian Family from Akhalkalaki, 1896

Regions with significant populations
- Georgia: Samtskhe-Javakheti

Languages
- Javakhian dialect of Georgian language

Religion
- † Georgian Orthodox Church

Javakhians (Georgian: ჯავახები, romanized: javakhebi) are an ethnic subgroup of Georgians, mainly living in Samtskhe-Javakheti region of Georgia. Javakhians are the indigenous population of Javakheti. In terminology, the name Javakheti is taken from "javakh" core with traditional Georgian –eti suffix; commonly, Javakheti means the home of Javakhs. Javakhians speak the Georgian language in Javakhian dialect. The self-designation of Javakhians is Javakhi.

== History ==
Javakhians are one of the earliest Kartvelian tribes that inhabited Iberia. The earliest mention of Javakhians was found in Urartu sources, in the notes of King Argishti I of Urartu, 785 BC, as “Zabakha” or “Zabakhian”. According to Cyril Toumanoff, the province of Javakheti was part of the Iberian duchy of Tsunda from the 4th or 3rd century BC. Saint Nino entered broader Iberia from Javakheti, and, following the course of the Kura river, she arrived in Mtskheta, the capital of the kingdom, where she eventually began to preach Christianity, which eventually culminated in the Christianization of Iberia.
