= Armenians in Georgia =

Ethnic group in Georgia

Total population
- 168,191–220,000 including Abkhazian estimates (2014)

Regions with significant populations
- Abkhazia, Samtskhe-Javakheti, Tbilisi,

Languages
- Armenian (Eastern), Georgian, Russian

Religion
- Armenian Apostolic Church

Related ethnic groups
- Armenians in Samtskhe-Javakheti, Armenians in Tbilisi, Armenians in Abkhazia, Armenians in Azerbaijan, Armenians in Russia

Armenians in Georgia or Georgian Armenians (Georgian: ქართველი სომხები, romanized: kartveli somkhebi; Armenian: Վիրահայեր, romanized: Virahayer) are Armenian people living within the country of Georgia. The Armenian community is mostly concentrated in the capital Tbilisi, Autonomous Republic of Abkhazia and Samtskhe-Javakheti region. 2014 Census of Georgia puts the Armenians in Samtskhe-Javakheti at 50.5% of the population. In Abkhazia, Armenians are the third largest ethnic group in the region after the Georgians and the Abkhazian majority.

== History ==
Medieval Armenian historians and chroniclers, such as Movses Khorenatsi, Ghazar Parpetsi, Pavstos Buzand, and others described Armenians in Georgia in large cities and historical provinces of this country. A large wave of Armenian settlers in the country's capital city of Tbilisi took place in the 12th–13th centuries, especially after 1122, in the aftermath of liberation of the Caucasus from Seljuk Turks by Georgian and Armenian forces under the leadership of King David IV and Tamar of Georgia.

In the 18th and 19th centuries, Armenian merchants, including famous jewelers and oil industrialists invested heavily in business in Georgia and helped build trading houses, cultural centers, schools and churches. Tbilisi became a veritable cultural center for Eastern Armenians ("arevelahayer", commonly called Russian-Armenians "rusahayer") just like Istanbul in Turkey became cultural center for the Western Armenians ("arevmedahayer", commonly called Turkish-Armenians "turkahayer" at the time).

As a result of the struggles of the Russian Empire with the Ottomans and its conquest of the Caucasus over the Qajar Iran, the Russian authorities found themselves able to settle Christian Armenian and Greek refugees in the area after 1828, following the ratified Treaty of Turkmenchay with Qajar Iran of 1828, and the Treaty of Adrianople with Ottoman Turkey of 1829.

=== Architecture ===
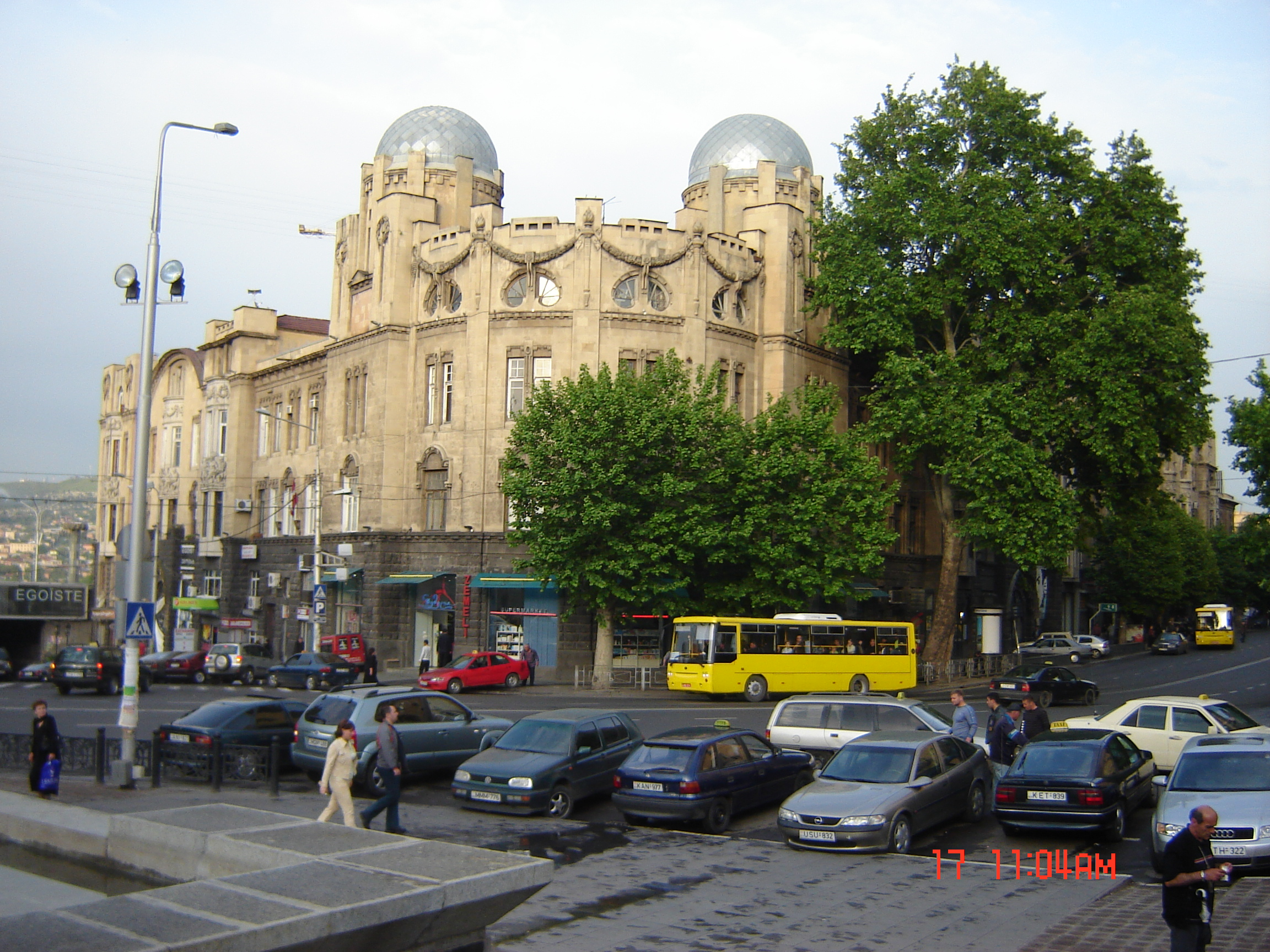
House of Armenian merchant Melik-Azaryants family in Tbilisi

Armenians left rich architectural imprint in Georgia, and Tbilisi has many architectural buildings constructed by Armenian architects of the last centuries. There are many mansions that were built by influential Armenians and comprise some of the most attractive historical buildings in Tbilisi. As an example of the Armenian presence is the house of Melik-Azaryants in Tbilisi on a principal avenue in Tbilisi called Rustaveli Avenue.

Domes of Armenian churches are seen in all parts of the city center. In the beginning of the 20th century there were as many as 30 Armenian churches in Tbilisi. Armenian Norashen Church, an architectural monument from 1701 is in ruins. The walls of Norashen, which means "new construction", had been decorated by the frescoes of Hovnatan Hovnatanian, the court painter of Georgian King Heraclius II.

=== Georgian–Armenian War 1918 ===
The Georgian–Armenian War was a border war fought in December 1918 between the Democratic Republic of Georgia and the First Republic of Armenia over parts of then disputed provinces of Lori and Javakheti, largely populated by Armenians (and Azerbaijanis in the north of Lori) in the 19th century. By the end of World War I, some of these territories were occupied by the Ottoman Empire, but when they abandoned the areas both Armenians and Georgians claimed control. The hostilities continued until the United Kingdom-brokered ceasefire was signed, leaving the disputed part of Lori under the joint Armenian-Georgian administration, which lasted until the establishment of Soviet rule in Armenia in 1920.

== Armenians in Soviet Georgia ==
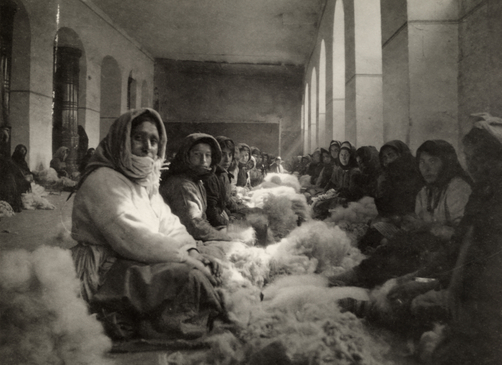
Armenian refugees from Turkey carding wool in Tiflis. Photograph by Melville Chater from National Geographic, 1920.

After the establishment of the Georgian Soviet Socialist Republic, and despite the establishment of the Armenian Soviet Socialist Republic, most Armenians decided to stay and enjoyed reasonably prosperous life, except for their religious freedoms, as the Communist government had nationalized most of the Armenian churches and cultural monuments and suppressed the religious freedoms of the general population including the Armenians. This resulted in dozens of churches closing. By the end of the Soviet era, only two Armenian churches had remained operational.

== Armenians in the Republic of Georgia ==
Armenians welcomed the establishment of the Republic of Georgia hoping for better living conditions after the collapse of the Soviet rule. However economic as well as social conditions have not been favorable for the community.

One of the biggest problems is the inability of the Armenians in Georgia to use Armenian language in public life. The government's new language policies are a source of strong resentment and it is accused of abolishing minorities' former rights to use Armenian or Russian and thus limiting access to jobs and education. President of Armenia, Robert Kocharyan has urged ethnic Armenians to learn the Georgian language, which he said is essential for their integration into the Georgian society.

Armenians in this region of Georgia should think about learning Georgian instead of how they could replace it with Armenian. Without the knowledge of Georgian Armenians in Georgia will not be able to seek senior and high government position and can not run successful businesses.

Tbilisi has only three strictly-Armenian schools and two operating churches.

Some Armenians believe they are victims of a policy to shift Samtskhe-Javakheti region's demographic balance as a number of Georgian families were settled there. Armenians are also underrepresented in the government (holding 5 seats in the 235-member Parliament, for example), leading to the perception of discrimination and mutual distrust. There were several protests, some of which turned violent after clashes with law enforcement agents.

=== Armenians in Tbilisi ===
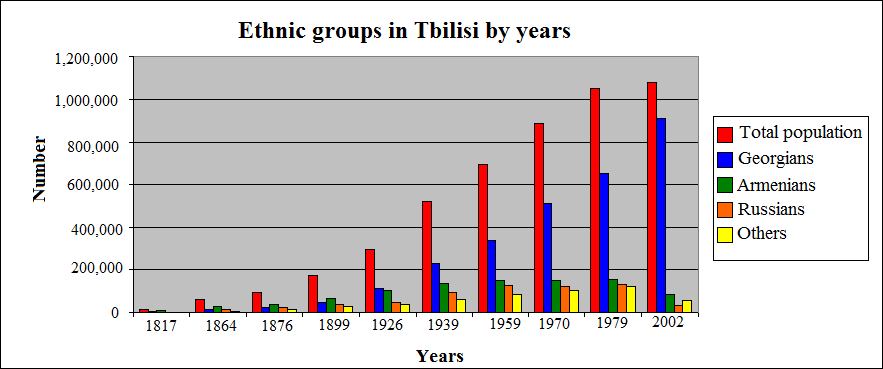
Ethnic groups in Tbilisi by years.

The Armenian history and contribution to the city of Tbilisi is very significant. After the Russian conquest of the area, Armenians fleeing persecution in the Ottoman Empire and Qajar Iran caused a jump in the Armenian population until it reached about 40% of the city total. Many of the mayors and business class were Armenian, and much of the old city was built by Armenians. Until recently the neighborhoods of Avlabari and the area across the river were very heavily Armenian, but that has changed a great deal in the last two decades.

==== Controversy over destruction and appropriation of Armenian churches ====
Out of the 29 Armenian churches in Tbilisi at the beginning of the 20th century, only two function today – Cathedral of Saint George in the Old Armenian Quarter and Ejmiatsin Church in the Avlabari District; the rest of them have been destroyed or turned into Georgian ones. As recently as 16 November 2008, a controversial Georgian priest organized excavations around Norashen Church, during which the tombstones of Armenian patrons of art of Tbilisi buried in the churchyard were removed.

=== Armenians in Samtskhe-Javakheti ===
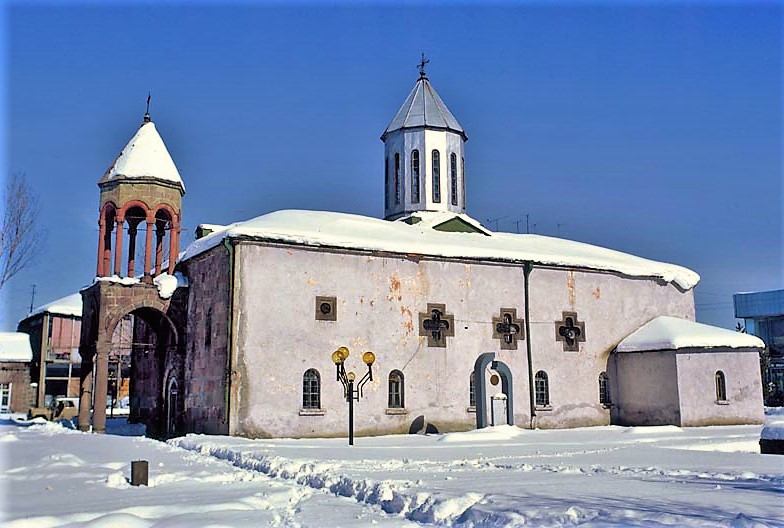
The Armenian church in Akhalkalaki

In 2014, the ethnic Armenians formed half of the population in the region of Samtskhe-Javakheti.

There were tensions in the region in the late 1980s and early 1990s with the local Armenian United Javakhk Democratic Alliance proposing a local autonomy for Javakheti within Georgia. Both Georgian and Armenian governments have pursued a careful and calming policy in regard with local nationalist movements that helped ease tensions in the region. The Baku–Tbilisi–Ceyhan pipeline and South Caucasus Pipelines, which pass through the region, have met opposition from local Armenians, as well as the Kars–Tbilisi–Baku railway, as it isolates Armenia.

=== Armenians in Abkhazia ===
The Autonomous Republic of Abkhazia also has a significant population of Armenians. They are the second largest ethnic group in the region after the Abkhazians. Armenians settled in Abkhazia in late 19th and the early 20th centuries and are now the largest ethnic group in Gagra, Sukhumi, and Gulripshi Districts, forming 20% of the Abkhazian population with 45,000 out of a total of 215,000.

During the war in Abkhazia in early 90s, most local Armenians supported Abkhazian secessionists, which resulted in increase of anti-Armenian sentiments within the Georgian society. However, the de facto Abkhaz authorities have been accused by local Armenian NGOs of intentionally decreasing the number of Abkhazian-Armenians.

=== Armenians in Adjara ===
Adjara is one of two autonomous republics of Georgia (the other being Abkhazia). Ethnic Georgians make up the majority while Armenians comprise 1.6% of the region's population. After Georgians (93.4%), Armenians (3%) comprise the second-largest ethnic group in the regional center of Batumi.

== Religion ==
=== Early history ===
The Armenian church in Georgia has 15 centuries of ecclesiastical presence as it had existed as early as the 5th century AD. Medieval Armenian historian Oukhtannes reported that in the Georgian town of Tsurtavi, there was an Armenian prelacy under the jurisdiction of the Armenian Patriarch, led by a bishop called Movses.

Another historian, Matheos of Urkha, reports that during the reign of Georgia's king David IV the Armenian church was granted status of a recognized diocese. Surb Gevork Armenian Cathedral of Tbilisi was then its administrative centre. Over 600 religious and cultural sites, like churches, seminaries, monasteries are documented, although a large portion of these sites is extinct due to natural disasters, vandalism, and other factors.

=== Present situation ===
The Armenians in Georgia belong mainly to the Armenian Apostolic faith, with important numbers of Armenian Catholics as well concentrated in Samtskhe-Javakheti.

=== Armenian Apostolic Church in Georgia ===
A majority of the Armenians living in Georgia belong to the Armenian Apostolic Church and are under the jurisdiction of the Mother See of Holy Etchmiadzin.

Local matters of the Armenian Georgians are run by the Diocese of the Armenian Apostolic Holy Church in Georgia. It is also known as Armenian: Վիրահայոց Թեմ (Virahayots' T'em). The head of the diocese is Bishop Vazgen Mirzakhanyan.

Today, only two Armenian churches are operational in Tbilisi. Several Armenian churches have already been destroyed, converted into Georgian ones, are in disputed about or are in the wake of being "Georgianized". The Armenian Church in Georgia has requested the repossession and the ownership rights over six Armenian churches. Five of them are in Tbilisi: Norashen Church, Church of the Holy Seal, Shamkhoretsots Surb Asdvadzatsin, Saint Gevork of Mughni Church, Surb Minas, another one – church of the Holy Seal—is in the town of Akhaltsikhe in Samtskhe-Javakheti. All these churches, today are closed and made no use of whatsoever by any denomination. During the Soviet era, the Communist government nationalized most Christian temples, but after restoration of Georgian sovereignty, these Armenian temples were not returned to the Armenian Church.

The reconstruction of churches requires huge investments and so far neither the Armenian Government, nor the Holy See Etchmiadzin or the Armenian Community of Tbilisi can afford it. Several Armenian churches in Georgia were redecorated to remove any characteristically Armenian architectural features and belong now to Georgian Orthodox or other faiths.

=== Catholic Armenians in Georgia ===
In Georgia, there are also an important segment of Armenian Catholics belonging to the Armenian Catholic Church notably in Samtskhe-Javakheti with fewer Armenian Catholics in the rest of the country including Tbilisi.

The Armenian Catholics are ruled by the "Catholic Diocese of Armenia, Georgia and Eastern Europe" that was reopened in 1991 after a long break during the Soviet era. Archbishop Nerses Ter-Nersesian, member of Mechitarists Congregation of Venice ran the diocese for many years and was later on replaced, because of age, by Archbishop Nshan Garakeheyan. The faithful of the Armenian Catholic Church use the Armenian Rite of liturgy; however, there also are Armenian Catholics who practice the Latin Rite of the Divine Liturgy (Holy Mass). Such Armenian Catholics, nevertheless, are regarded by Vatican as belonging to the Armenian Catholic Church.

=== Georgian Byzantine-Rite Catholics and the Armenian Rite ===
Towards the end of the nineteenth century, when almost all Georgian Catholics were of the Latin rite, some wished to use the Byzantine rite used by the Georgian Orthodox Church. The Russian Empire, which had controlled Georgia since the beginning of that century, made use of that rite exclusive to the Eastern Orthodox Church.

Accordingly, some of these Catholic Georgians, clergy as well as laity, adopted the Armenian Rite and joined the Armenian Catholic diocese of Artvin, which had been set up in Russian Transcaucasia in 1850. Only after the granting of religious freedom in Russia in 1905 did some Catholics in Georgia eventually adopt the Byzantine rite.

== Education ==
Capital Tbilisi has three strictly Armenian schools. There are also five Armenian-Russian and Armenian-Georgian schools. All of them teach Armenian language and literature in addition to the official curriculum. But a common complaint is that Armenian History hours are not included. The Armenian Government sends thousands of textbooks in Armenian to the schools. But still, the schools have a deficit of books, furniture, and all need urgent renovation. Annually around 50 Armenian students of Georgian nationality enter Armenian universities.

== Media ==
Tbilisi was an important center for Armenian language publications, including the publishing of Haratch by the Armenian Revolutionary Federation for the period 1906 to 1909. It included as editors and writers renowned political and literary names.

After restrictions by the Russian authorities, the newspaper was replaced by "Horizon" that was not affiliated with any specific political party and went on publishing until 1918.

Presently, an Armenian newspaper Vrastan is published in Tbilisi in Armenian. In 2014, a new newspaper Ardzagank started publishing in Tbilisi.

== Organizations ==
There are a number of Armenian organizations and associations in Georgia. Amongst them:

- United Javakhk Democratic Alliance
- Armenian Community of Tbilisi
- Armenian Center of Cooperation of Georgia (ACCG)

== List of notable Armenians in Georgia ==
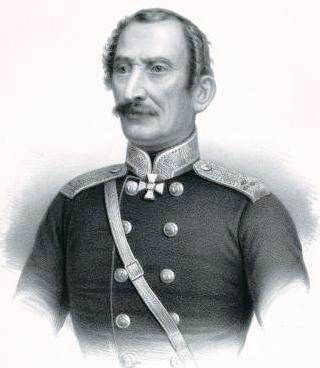
Vasilii Osipovich Bebutov

=== Political and social personalities ===
Khojaminasishvili (Georgian: ხოჯამინასიშვილი) was a wealthy Armenian mercantile family in Georgia which was ennobled, with the dignity of Prince (tavadi), by the Georgian king Heraclius II of Georgia in 1775, and confirmed in their title by the Russian Empire in 1857.

Bebutov (Georgian: ბებუთოვი, Russian: Бебутовы), also known as Bebutashvili (Georgian: ბებუთაშვილი), was a Georgian noble family of Armenian ethnicity which played an important role in the economical and social life of the city of Tbilisi throughout the 17th and 18th century, and later served in the military of the Russian Empire in the 19th century.

Alexander Khatisian (Armenian: Ալեքսանդր Խատիսյան) was an Armenian politician and a journalist. He served as the mayor of Tbilisi from 1910 to 1917. During the establishment of the First Republic of Armenia, he served as a member from the Armenian National Council of Tiflis to the Armenian National Congress (1917) and later to the permanent executive committee selected by the Armenian National Congress. After declaration of the First Republic of Armenia, he served as Foreign Minister and signed the Treaty of Batum with the Ottoman Empire. He was elected as the prime minister from 1919 to 1920.

Hovhannes Kajaznuni (Armenian: Յովհաննէս Քաջազնունի (Yovhannēs Kajaznuni)) (Akhaltsikhe, Georgia 1868 – Yerevan, Armenia 1938) was the first Prime Minister of the First Republic of Armenia from 30 May 1918 to 28 May 1919. He was a member of the Armenian Revolutionary Federation.

=== Arts ===
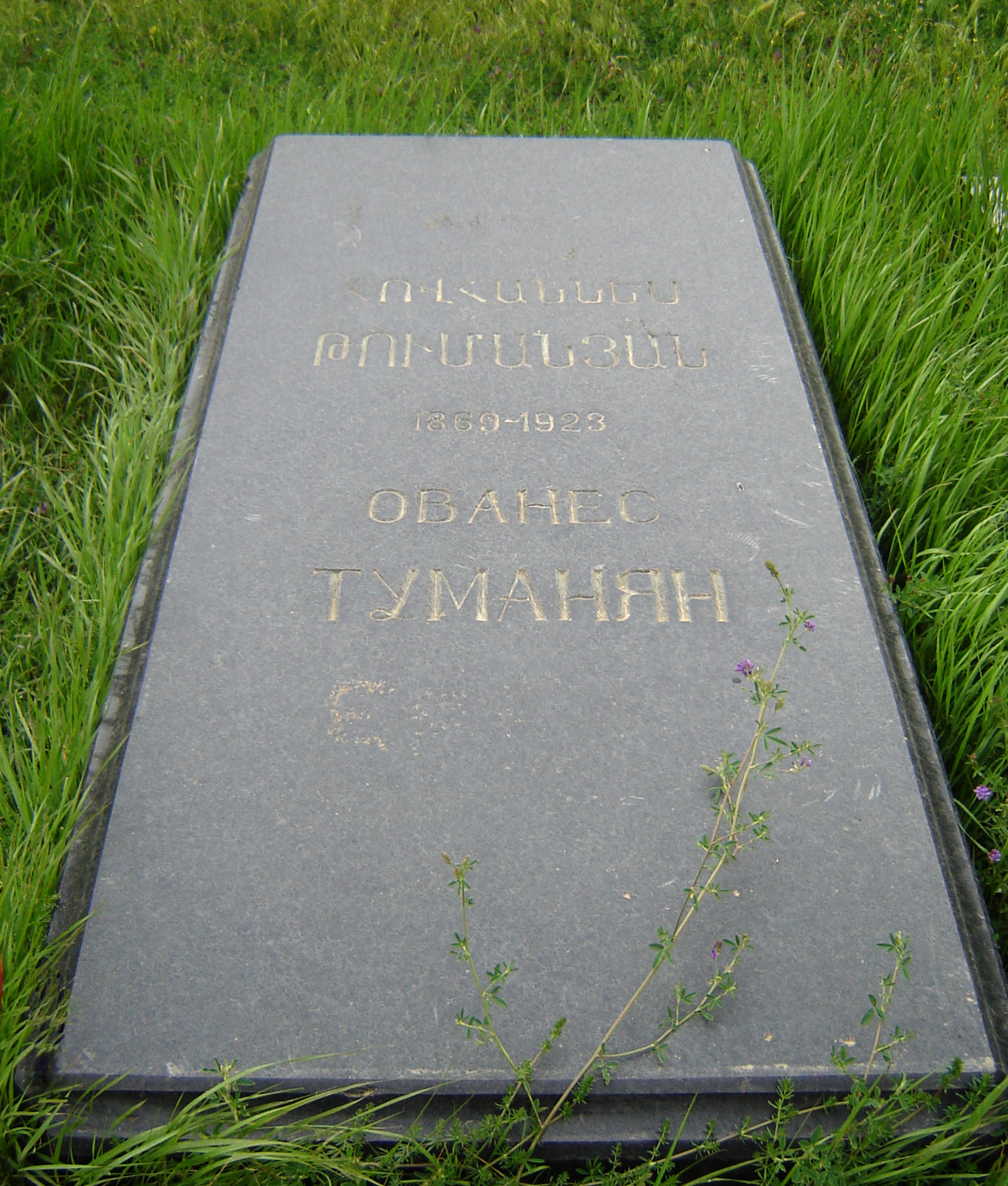
Tombstone of Hovhannes Tumanyan in Tbilisi, Georgia

Sayat-Nova (Armenian: Սայաթ-Նովա (Sayat'-Nova); Persian/Azeri: سایات‌نووا; Georgian: საიათ-ნოვა) was born in Tbilisi (Tiflis in Armenian) on 14 June 1712 and died in Haghpat on 22 September 1795 and is known as "King of Songs" for Armenians. Real name is Harutyun Sayatyan and his mother Sara was a Georgian Armenian although father was Karapet from Aleppo or Adana. Sayat-Nova was skilled in writing poetry, singing and playing the kamancheh. He performed in the court of Heraclius II of Georgia, where he also worked as a diplomat. He lost his political clout at the royal court when he fell in love with the Georgian king's daughter, and spent the rest of his life as an itinerant bard. In 1795 he was killed in Haghpat Monastery by the army of Agha Mohammed Khan. About 220 songs can be attributed to Sayat-Nova, although he may have written thousands altogether. Most of his songs are in Armenian, Georgian, Azeri and Persian. A number of them are sung to this day. He was also fluent in Arabic. Sayat-Nova is considered by many the greatest ashough (folk singer-songwriter) that ever lived in the Caucasus (the area between the Black and the Caspian sea). In Armenia Sayat Nova is also considered a poet with a considerable contribution to the Armenian poetry of his century. His tomb is found on the main Armenian cathedral Surb Gevork premises in Tbilisi.

Raffi (Armenian: Րաֆֆի) the pen name of Hakob Melik Hakobian (Armenian: Յակոբ Մելիք-Յակոբեան) is a renowned Armenian author born in 1835 in Payajouk, an Armenian village situated in north of Iran, but led all his productive literary life in Tbilisi (Tiflis in Armenian) where he died in 1888. Raffi is a prominent figure of Armenian literature.

Gabriel Sundukian (Armenian: Գաբրիել Սունդուկյան (Gabriel Sundukyan) was born in Tbilisi in 1825 and died there in 1912. He was an outstanding Armenian writer and playwright, the founder of modern Armenian drama. Coming from a wealthy Armenian family, Sundukian learned both classical and modern Armenian, French, Italian and Russian, studied at the University of Saint Petersburg, where he wrote a dissertation on the principles of Persian versification. Then he returned to Tiflis and entered the civil service. In 1863, the Armenian theatre company of Tiflis staged his first play, Sneezing at Night's Good Luck. His well-known play "Pepo" (1871) was made into the first Armenian talkie in 1935. Another famous film based on his work is "Khatabala" (1971). The Armenian State Theatre in Yerevan is named in his honor.

Hovhannes Tumanyan (Armenian: Հովհաննես Թումանյան (Hovhannes T'umanyan)) (1869–1923) is considered one of the greatest Armenian poets and writers. He was born in village of Dsegh in the province of Lori, Armenia, but lived and wrote in Tbilisi. He is usually regarded in Armenian circles as "All-Armenian poet". He created lyrics, fables, epic poems and translations into Armenian of Byron, Goethe and Pushkin.

Aram Khachaturian (Armenian: Արամ Խաչատրյան (Aram Khachatryan)); Russian: Аpaм Ильич Xaчaтypян) (1903–1978) was a Soviet-Armenian composer whose works were often influenced by Armenian folk music. He was born in Tbilisi, Georgia, to a poor Armenian family and immigrated to Moscow.

Gayane Khachaturian (Armenian: Գայանե Խաչատուրյան (Gayane Khachaturyan)) (9 May 1942 – 1 May 2009), prolific Georgian-Armenian painter and graphic artist associated with Magical Realism and Surrealism, was born into an Armenian family in Tbilisi.

Sergei Parajanov (Armenian: Սարգիս Հովսեփի Փարաջանյան, (Sargis Hovsep'i P'arajanyan); Georgian: სერგეი (სერგო) ფარაჯანოვი; Russian: Серге́й Иосифович Параджанов), was born in Tbilisi in 1924 and was a Soviet Armenian film director and artist, widely regarded as one of the 20th century's greatest masters of cinema. He was arrested several times because of his work. It was not until mid-80s, when political climate started to change, that he could resume directing. Still, it required help of influential Georgian actor David (Dodo) Abashidze and other friends to have his last feature films green-lighted. His health seriously weakened by 4 years in labor camps and 9 months in Tbilisi prison, Parajanov died of lung cancer in 1990, at the time when, after almost 20 years of suppression, his films were finally again allowed to be featured in foreign film festivals.

Mikael Tariverdiev (Russian: Микаэл Таривердиев (1931–1996, was born in Tbilisi and was a prominent Soviet composer of Armenian descent. He headed the Composers' Guild of Soviet Cinematographers' Union from its inception.

=== Sciences ===
Sebastian Shaumyan (1916–2007) was a Soviet and American theoretician of linguistics and a passionate partisan of a structuralist analysis. Having learnt German and English in addition to his Armenian, Georgian and Russian, Shaumyan took his degree in philology at Tbilisi State University. Shaumyan published Structural Linguistics in 1965 and founded the Section of Structural Linguistics at the Institute of Russian Language in Moscow. He co-wrote Fundamentals of the Generative Grammar of Russian (1958), and Applicational Generative Model and Transformational Calculus of Russian (1963), both with Soboleva.

=== Sports ===
Tigran Petrosian (Armenian: Տիգրան Պետրոսյան (Tigran Petrosyan)) was born in Tbilisi in 1929 and died in 1984). He spent most of his childhood in Georgia. He learned the game of chess at the age of eight, after entering a local chess school at the Tbilisi Pioneer's Palace (currently known as Tbilisi Children's Palace). Petrosian's first coach was Archil Ebralidze. He became World Chess Champion from 1963 to 1969. He was nicknamed "Iron Tigran" due to his playing style because of his almost impenetrable defence, which emphasised safety above all else. He was a Candidate for the World Championship on eight occasions (1953, 1956, 1959, 1962, 1971, 1974, 1977 and 1980), won the world championship in 1963 (against Botvinnik) and 1966 (against Spassky), thus he was the defending World Champion or a World Champion candidate in ten consecutive three-year cycles. He won the Soviet Championship four times (1959, 1961, 1969, and 1975). He was arguably the hardest player to beat in the history of chess.

== Armenian-Georgian relations ==
Armenia and Georgia have a long history of cultural and political relations. The interaction peaked in the Middle Ages when both nations engaged in prolific cultural dialogue and allied themselves against the neighboring Muslim empires. There were frequent intermarriages between Armenian and Georgian royal and noble families and both ethnicities intermingled in several border areas.

Armenian-Georgian relations have always been substantive, but they have become even more pronounced in the post-Soviet independence years. Armenia and Georgia governments have had generally positive relations, but there have also been some problems in the past. There are many Armenians living in Georgia in great numbers though no substantive number of Georgians live in Armenia.

Despite the great number of Armenians in Georgia, and having 5 Armenian members, the Georgian Parliament has not passed a law for Recognition of the Armenian Genocide as yet. Some say that at least one of the reasons for non-recognition is the large number of Azeri population in Georgia (a large minority in the Republic of Georgia).

== See also ==
- Armenia–Georgia relations
- Armenians in Abkhazia
- Armenians in Samtskhe-Javakheti
- Armenians in Tbilisi
- Georgians in Armenia
- Samtskhe-Javakheti
- Tsalka
- Armenian National Council of Tiflis
- St. George's Armenian Apostolic Church, Tbilisi

== Bibliography ==
- Aris Ghazinyan (1 November 2008). "THE 'ARMENIAN PROBLEM': HAYASTANSIS IN GEORGIA FACE CHALLENGES OVER ETHNICITY". AGBU. Archived from the original on 22 September 2010.
