= Karapet Chobanyan =

- Born: 25 February 1927; Karzakh, Georgian SSR, Soviet Union
- Died: 15 October 1978 (aged 51); Yerevan, Armenian SSR, Soviet Union
- Education: Armenian National Academy
- Scientific career
- Fields: theoretical physics

Karapet Chobanyan (Armenian: Կարապետ Չոբանյան; born 25 February 1927 in Karzakh, Akhalkalaki, Georgia and died on 15 October 1978) was an Armenian scientist and engineer who discovered the phenomenon of Low-Stress in mechanics and developed a new method of welding.

== Biography ==
Karapet Chobanyan was born in February 1927, as the first child of Armenuhi and Sirakan Chobanyan.

=== Education ===
Karapet Chobanyan graduated from Yerevan State University in 1948 and completed his PhD in physics in 1951.

== Scientific activity ==
In 1954 Karapet Chobanyan joined as a scientist to Armenian National Academy's Institute of Mechanics and Institute of Mathematics. He became the head of the Department of Durability of Compounds of Armenian National Academy's Institute of Mechanics in 1972.

== Discovery of phenomenon of low-stress ==
In 1966, while studying the effect of material inhomogeneity on stress distribution, he discovered a previously unknown phenomenon in the theory of elasticity, which he later called the phenomenon of Low-Stress. This discovery became an important progress in the science which allowed to significantly increase the strength of welded structures and to change the perceptions of limited abilities of welding.

Karapet Chobanyan made the first discovery in Armenia and Transcaucasus which was registered in the Soviet Union's discovery registry under number 102 after 7 years of applying for registration in 1978.

== Impact of discovery ==
The discovery of Chobanyan and the further studies made on its basis have opened wide prospects for the calculation of new constructive schemes for gluing, and welding of metals and plastics, for making more durable and precise devices, constructions, etc.
