= Jivani =

Armenian poet and musician (1846–1909)

Jivani Ջիվանի
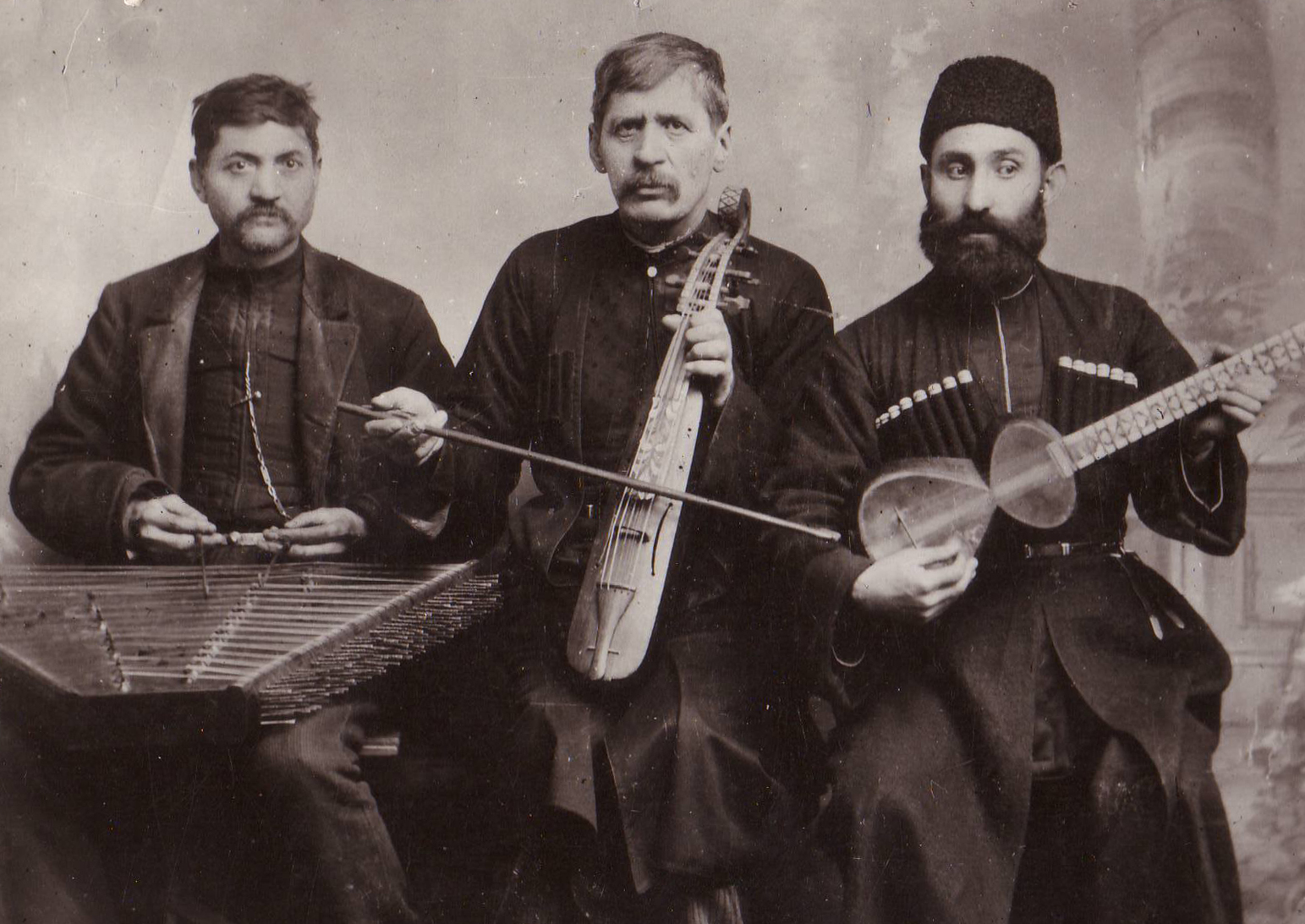
- Ashugh Jivani (center) with instrumentalists
- Born: Serob Stepani Levonian; Սերոբ Ստեփանի Լևոնյան; 1846; Kartsakhi, Tiflis Governorate, Russian Empire (present-day Georgia)
- Died: 5 March 1909 (aged 62–63); Tiflis, Russian Empire (present-day Georgia)
- Occupations: Poet, ashugh
- Spouse: Ashkhen

Jivani (Armenian: Ջիվանի; 1846–1909), born Serob Stepani Levonian (Armenian: Սերոբ Ստեփանի Լևոնյան; also known as Serovbe Stepani Benkoyan, Armenian: Սերովբե Ստեփանի Բենկոյան), was an Armenian ashugh (bard) and poet.

== History ==
Jivani was born in Kartsakhi, near Akhalkalaki, Georgia. He became an orphan when he was 8, his uncle looked after him. He learned music composition and performance on kemanche and violin with the support of master Ghara-Ghazar (Armenian: Ղարա-Ղազար, Սիայի). In 1866 along with gusan Sazain (Aghajan) Jivani moved to Tbilisi, where he continued his musical activities. The further development of Jivani's art is connected to Alexandropol (Gyumri) and its musical culture. He lived and worked there in 1868–1895. In Alexandropol he headed a circle of fellow gusan-singers, and was awarded by the honorary title of ustabashi (leading master). Jivani had concerts all over Transcaucasia, including Batumi, Baku, Kars and Tbilisi. In 1895, he returned to Tbilisi.

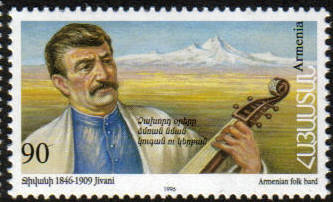
An Armenian postal stamp featuring Jivani playing a kamani

Jivani was an author of more than 800 songs, written in romantic, ironical or realistic styles. He had the good knowledge of 19th century Armenian literature, and was influenced by it. He used clear forms of Armenian language, avoided of foreign transliterations. His songs were mainly devoted to the problems of social protest, poverty and lawlessness ("The Life in the Village", "Worker", etc.). In his songs Jivani condemned oppressors, represented the struggle of Armenian people against foreign rule, sang about the brotherhood of people. Many of Jivani's songs ("The Unhappy Days", "Mother", "At this night", "A good comrade", "I am an apricot tree", "Look at them") became popular.

The first compilation of Jivani's poems was published in 1885. His music was performed or used by Kristapor Kara-Murza, Komitas Vardapet, Aram Khachaturian, and many others, Maxim Gorky and Valery Bryusov were interested in his poetry. He is recognized as the "greatest Armenian ashugh of the 19th century".

== Memorials ==
Ashough Jivani's House-Museum opened in 2016 in Kartsakhi.
