= Kartsakhi =

Kartsakhi Georgian: კარწახი Armenian: Կարծախ
- Village
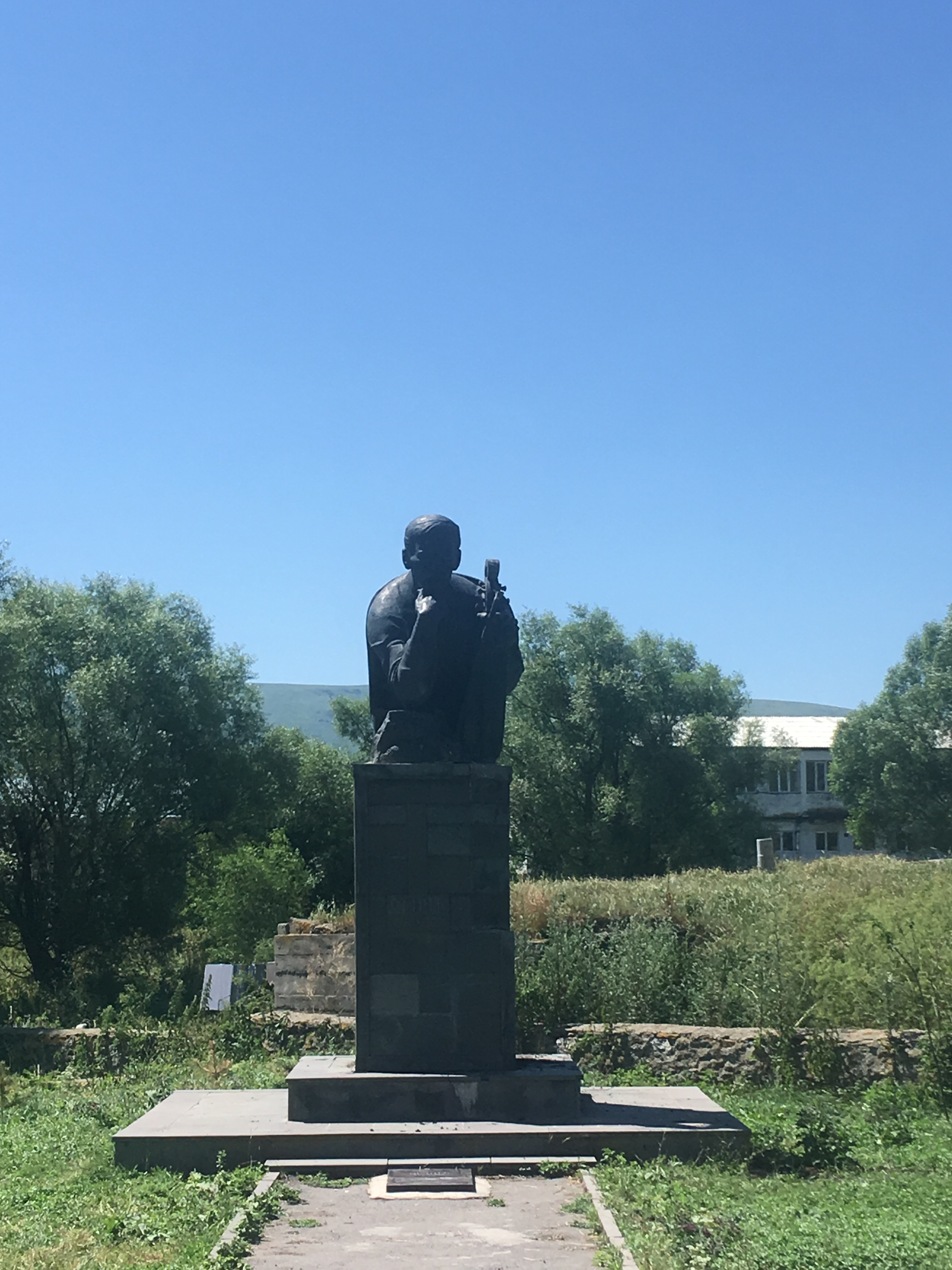
- Monument to Jivani in Kartsakhi

- Location within Georgia Location within Samtskhe-Javakheti
- Coordinates: 41°14′45″N 43°16′44″E
- Country: Georgia
- Mkhare: Samtskhe–Javakheti
- district: Akhalkalaki Municipality

Population (2014)
  - Total: 776
- Time zone: UTC+4 (Georgian Time)

Kartsakhi (Georgian: კარწახი, Armenian: Կարծախ) also spelled Kartsakh and Karzakh is a village in Akhalkalaki Municipality, Samtskhe–Javakheti, Georgia. It is located on the bank of Kartsakhi Lake, the second largest lake in the country.

== History ==
The village is located on the road connecting Akhalkalaki to the border with Turkey. The Karcachi railway station is the last stop on the Georgian side of the Baku–Tbilisi–Kars railway.

== Attractions ==
- Ashough Jivani's House-Museum
- The Kartsakhi nature reserve

== Notable people ==
- Jivani (1846–1909)
- Karapet Chobanyan (1927–1978)
