= Javakheti =

Historical region

Coordinates: 41.4000°N 43.5000°E

- Historical region
- Map highlighting the historical region of Javakheti in Georgia
- Largest city: Akhalkalaki

Area
  - Total: 2,588 km^{2} (999 sq mi)
- Elevation (highest point: Didi Abuli): 3,300 m (10,800 ft)

Population (2014)
  - Total: 69,561
  - Density: 26.88/km^{2} (69.61/sq mi)
- Javakheti is not an official subdivision of the Georgia; it constitutes a historical region only.

Javakheti (Georgian: ჯავახეთი [d͡ʒäväχe̞t̪ʰi]) or Javakhk (Armenian: Ջավախք, Javakhk) (Note: Classical spelling: Ջաւախք) is a historical province in southern Georgia, corresponding to the modern municipalities of Akhalkalaki, Aspindza (partly), Ninotsminda, and partly to what is now Turkey's Ardahan Province. Historically, Javakheti's borders were defined by the Kura River (Mtkvari) to the west, and the Shavsheti, Samsari and Nialiskuri mountains to the north, south and east, respectively. The principal economic activities in this region are subsistence agriculture, particularly potatoes and raising livestock.

In 1995, the Akhalkalaki and Ninotsminda districts, comprising the historical territory of Javakheti, were merged with the neighboring land of Samtskhe to form a new administrative region, Samtskhe–Javakheti. As of January 2020, the total population of Samtskhe–Javakheti is 152,100 individuals. Armenians comprise the majority of Javakheti's population. According to the 2014 Georgian census, 93% (41,870) of the inhabitants in Akhalkalaki Municipality and 95% (23,262) in Ninotsminda Municipality were Armenians, with only tiny numbers of ethnic Georgians and Caucasus Greeks remaining.

== Etymology ==
The name Javakheti consists of the root javakh with the Georgian suffix -eti, commonly found in the names of countries and regions. Javakheti means the land of the Javakhs (an ethnic subgroup of Georgians). The earliest mention of the name is believed to be from 785 BC, in the inscriptions of the Urartian king Argishti I, as Zabakha.

== History ==
=== Antiquity ===
The ancient tribe of Meskhetians is the first known inhabitants of the area.

In the sources, the region was recorded as Zabakha in 785 BC, by King Argishti I of Urartu and, probably, meaning one of the ethnic groups of Urartu. According to Cyril Toumanoff, Javakheti, together with Erusheti, was part of the Iberian duchy of Tsunda from the 4th or 3rd century BC. Since 2nd century BC to 5th century AD this region was a part of an Armenian province - Gugark, in Greater Armenia.

Saint Nino entered Iberia from Javakheti, one of the southern provinces of Iberia, and, following the course of the River Kura, she arrived in Mtskheta, the capital of the kingdom, once there, she eventually began to preach Christianity, which culminated by Christianization of Iberia.

One of the earliest Armenian sources, Faustus of Byzantium (the 5th century) writes: “Maskut King Sanesan, extremely angry, was filled with hate for his tribesman, Armenian King Khosrow, and gathered all of his troops—Huns, Pokhs, Tavaspars, Khechmataks, Izhmakhs, Gats, Gluars, Gugars, Shichbs, Chilbs, Balasich, and Egersvans, as well as an uncountable number of other diverse nomadic tribes, all the numerous troops he commanded. He crossed his border, the great River Kura, and invaded the Armenian country.”

In the 5th century during the rule of Vakhtang I of Iberia Javakheti was a province of Iberia and after his death his second wife the Byzantine princess settled in Tsunda (part of Javakheti).

=== Middle Ages ===
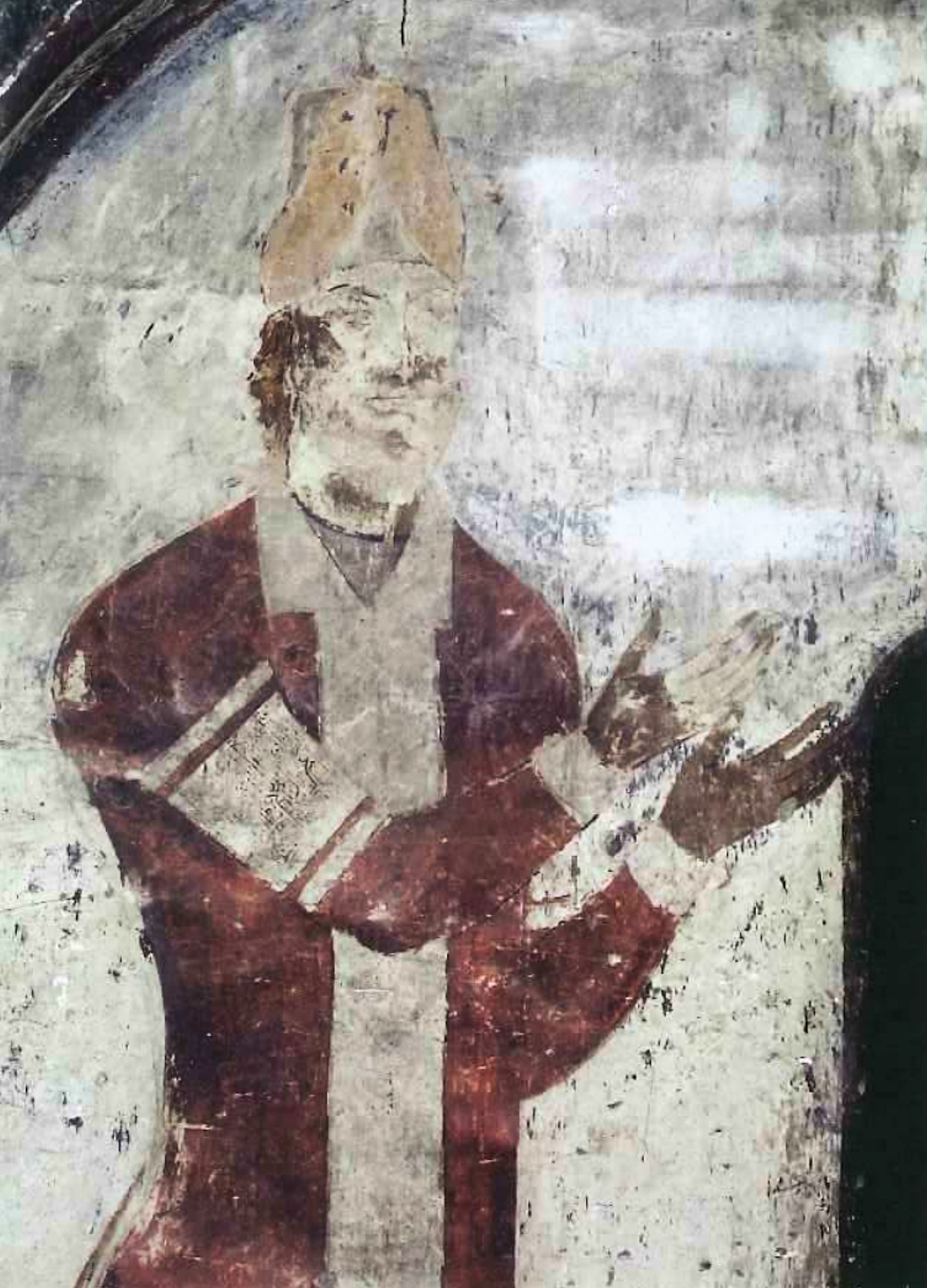
Rati I Surameli, Duke of Javakheti and Kartli.

In the struggle against the Arab occupation, Bagrationi dynasty came to rule over Tao-Klarjeti and established the Kingdom of the Iberians. Rulers of Tao-Klarjeti fought the Arabs from this region, and gradually incorporated surrounding lands of Samtskhe and Javakheti, along with a few other lands, into its territory.

10th century Armenian historian, Ukhtanes, wrote about the family tree of Kyrion, the Catholicos of Iberia. The literal translation of this text is as follows: Kyrion “came from the Iberians in terms of country and lineage, from the region of the Javakhs.” There can be no doubt that Ukhtanes believed Javakheti to be part of Iberia, and the Javakhs to be Iberians. Z. Aleksidze examines the viewpoint of this historian and the enlightened Armenian society of the 10th century on the problem that interests us in depth.

In the mid-10th century, part of Javakheti was incorporated into Kingdom of Abkhazia. In 964 Leon III of Abkhazia extended his influence to Javakheti, and during his reign the Kumurdo Cathedral was built. In subsequent centuries, Javakheti remained in the hands of the unified Georgian monarchy and had a period of significant development, during which numerous bridges, churches, monasteries, and royal residences (Lgivi, Ghrtila, Bozhano, Vardzia, etc.) were built. This territory suffered greatly from the invasions of Alp Arslan in 1064. In 1118, the Seljuks again invaded Javakheti and killed its ruling Georgian feudal lord, Beshken II Jaqeli. However, King David the Builder managed to take revenge on them and defeat them.

In 1245, Javakheti came under the control of the Toreli feudal family. In 1268, Javakheti was annexed by the principality of Samtskhe-Saatabago, ruled by the House of Jaqeli. In 1587, the region, along with the entirety of the Principality, was occupied by the Ottoman Empire becoming the Childir Eyalet. The area's population was devastated by the Turco-Mongol incursions. In 1484, Yaqub bin Uzun Hasan of the Aq Qoyunlu devastated the principality. Islam began to spread in the area among both Georgians and Armenians.

In the XVI century, as mentioned, the Ottoman Empire conquered the region of Javakheti. Toward the end of the same century, in an effort to maximize tax collection, the Ottoman authorities conducted a comprehensive population survey of the area. According to the data obtained from this survey, it is evident that Georgians made up approximately 90 – 95% of Javakheti’s population during the 16th century.

As the Georgian Church began to lose influence in the area, many Georgians became Muslim, the process is also known as Turkification of Meskhetians (then Meskhetian Turks).

=== Russian Empire ===
In the first third of the 19th century, following the Russo-Persian War (1804-1813) and the Russo-Persian War of 1826-1828, Russia conquered the Southern Caucasus, and most of Georgia, along with the rest of the Caucasus, was incorporated within the Russian Empire. When the Russians conquered Javakheti it was home to 1,716 Armenians (67.7%), 639 Muslim (25.2%), and 179 Georgian families (7.1%). Many of the Muslim families chose to resettle in the Ottoman Empire following the Russian annexation of the region. The Tsarist government initiated a plan to resettle its new frontier with Iran and Turkey with Armenians who they deemed to be loyal. In total some 90,000 Armenians from the Ottoman Empire and 40,000 Armenians from Qajar Iran resettled in the Russian Caucasus, primarily the Armenian Oblast. In 1829 some 7,300 Armenian families (58,000 people) resettled in Meskheti, Javakheti, and Trialeti. Armenians moving to Trialeti were joined by Turkish-speaking Caucasus Greeks known as Urums. Armenians moving to Javakheti were joined by a number of Doukhobors, a spiritual Christian sect from Russia. In the early 20th century, a large number of Armenian refugees from the Armenian genocide in the Ottoman Empire, and Doukhobor sect members of Russian Empire, settled the region.

An 1886 report found 63,799 people living in Javakheti, of which 46,384 were Armenians (72.7%), 6,674 Russians (10.5%), 6,091 Turks (9.5%), and 3,741 Georgians (5.9%). The Russian Empire Census of 1897 found 72,709 people in Javakheti, of which 52,539 were Armenians (72.3%), 6,868 were Turks (9.4%), 6,448 were Georgians, and 5,155 were Russians (7.1%).

By 1916, the ethno-religious composition of the Javakheti region (Akhalkalaki Uyezd) was the following:

Nationality	Urban	Rural	TOTAL	
Armenians	6,151	76,624	82,775	77.2%
Georgians	265	10,039	10,304	9.6%
Russians	429	7,113	7,542	7.0%
Shia Muslims	0	5,431	5,431	5.1%
Kurds	0	904	904	0.8%
Jews	204	0	204	0.2%
TOTAL	7,055	100,118	107,173	100.0%

=== Brief independence ===
Following the Russian Revolution, Javakheti was incorporated into the short-lived Democratic Republic of Georgia, however, it was strongly disputed by the Democratic Republic of Armenia which claimed the region on grounds of history and ethnography. Hovannisian, a notable historian on the topic of the interwar republic of Armenia, describes the fate of the more than eighty-thousand Armenians of Javakheti after the region's occupation by the Ottoman army:

Thirty thousand had perished as the result of the Turkish occupation, and those who survived were starving. Some mothers attempted to save their daughters by offering them as wives to Georgian militiamen and soldiers ... hundreds of women and children were pressed into servitude in the adjacent Muslim districts. All roads leading away from Akhalkalak were strewn with the bodies of fleeing Armenians. In September ... of the more than 80,000 Armenians in the county at the beginning of 1918, only 40,000 were left and that these were rapidly succumbing to famine, foreign marriages, concubinage, or to even worse fates. Although the Tiflis government regarded Akhalkalak as an integral part of the Republic of Georgia ... it did nothing to relieve the agony.

Lord Curzon during the Paris Peace Conference discussions on the fate of the independent Transcaucasian republics assessed the ethnographic situation in the southwestern uezds of the Tiflis Governorate:

Along the line marking the proposed northeastern boundary of Armenia, the counties of Akhalkalaki and Akhaltsikhe fell on the Georgian side, even though, it was stated, they were populated primarily by the Armenian descendants of refugees from Turkey: “On the grounds of nationality, therefore, these districts ought to belong to Armenia, but they command the heart of Georgia strategically, and on the whole it would seem equitable to assign them to Georgia, and give their Armenian inhabitants the option of emigration into the wide territories assigned to the Armenians towards the south-west.”

=== Soviet era ===
Georgia came fully under Soviet control in 1921, and Javakheti, along with other former Georgian territories, became part of the Georgian SSR. The remaining Muslim minority in Javakheti, also known as "Meskhetian Turks", were deported to Uzbekistan in 1944 during the regime of Stalin.

=== Modern Georgia ===
Currently Armenians form the ethnic majority in the region. Since post-Soviet independence, many members of the Doukhobor community have left for Russia. Ecological migrants from Adjara are also present.

== Current situation ==
Between 2006 and 2011, 220 km of the highway from Kvemo Kartli to Samtskhe-Javakheti was improved as part of a program of the US Millennium Challenge Account to more effectively link the region with the rest of Georgia. In more recent years, a railway line has been constructed to run between Kars, Turkey to Baku, Azerbaijan via the area (see: Baku–Tbilisi–Kars railway), which opened in 2017. The Armenian population of Javakheti was opposed to this rail link because it excludes and isolates Armenia. There is already another railroad linking Georgia, Armenia and Turkey, which is the Kars–Gyumri–Tbilisi railway line. The existing line is in working condition and could be operational within weeks, but due to the Turkish blockade of Armenia since 1993, the railroad is not operational.

== See also ==
- Armenians in Georgia
  - Armenians in Samtskhe-Javakheti
- List of Armenian ethnic enclaves

== Bibliography ==
- Lalayan, Yervand (1895). Ջաւախք [Javakhk'] (in Armenian). Azgagrakan Handes [Ethnographic Review].
- Abuladze, Tsisana (1983). Turkish Sources for the History of Samtskhe-Saatabago in the First Quarter of the 16th Century (in Georgian). Tbilisi: Mecniereba.
- Lortkipanidze, Mariam; Japaridze, Otar; Muskhelishvili, David; Metreveli, Roin (2012). History of Georgia in four volumes, vol. II - History of Georgia from the 4th century to the 13th century. Tbilisi: National Academy of Sciences of Georgia. ISBN 978-9941-19-585-3.
- K. Kekelidze Institute of Manuscripts (2005). Mravaltavi: Philological and Historical Researches, Vol. XXI. Tbilisi: National Centre of Manuscripts; K. Kekelidze Institute of Manuscripts. ISSN 1512-0619.
