= Bath salts =

Bath water additives

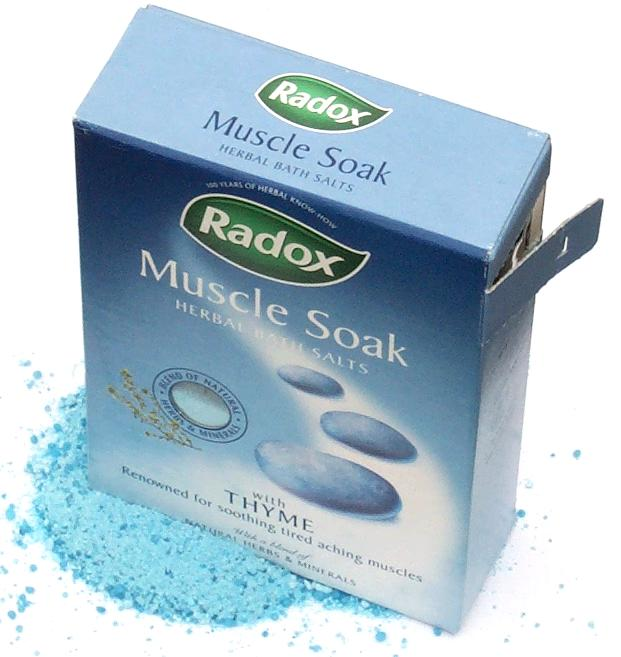
Bath salts from Radox

Bath salts are water-soluble, pulverized minerals that are added to water to be used for bathing. It is said that these salts improve cleaning, enhance the enjoyment of bathing, and serve as a vehicle for cosmetic agents. Bath salts have been developed that mimic the properties of natural mineral baths or hot springs. Some bath salts contain glycerine so the product will act as an emollient, humectant, or lubricant. Fragrances and colors are often added to bath salts; the fragrances are used to increase the users' enjoyment of the bathing experience.

== Description ==
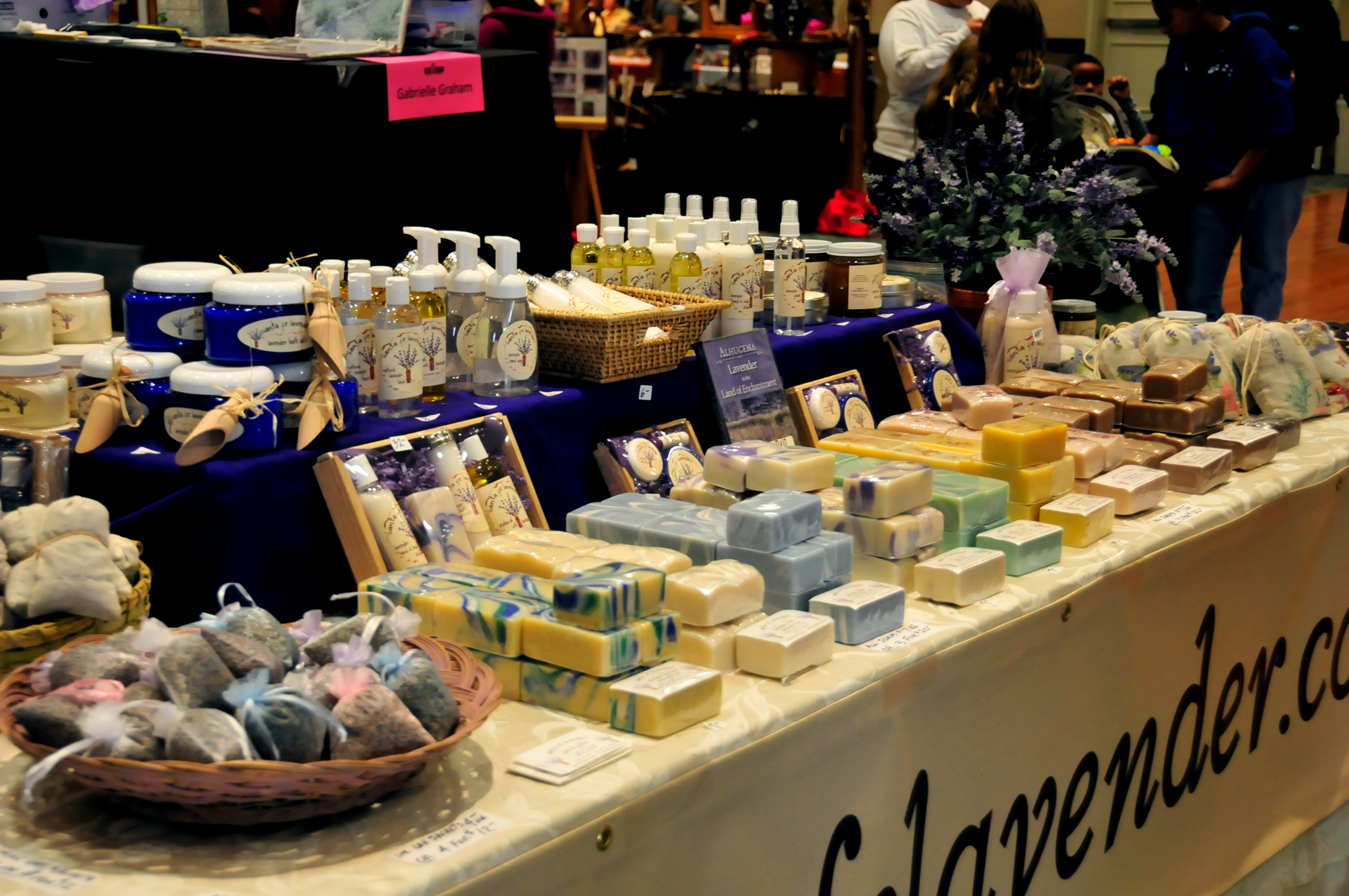
A selection of bathing products, including bath salts.

Substances often labeled as bath salts include magnesium sulfate (Epsom salts), sodium chloride (table salt), sodium bicarbonate (baking soda), sodium hexametaphosphate (Calgon, amorphous/glassy sodium metaphosphate), sodium sesquicarbonate, sodium citrate and formerly borax. Glycerin, or liquid glycerin, is another common ingredient in bath salts.

Fragrances and colors are often added to bath salts; in fact, one purpose of salts is as a vehicle or diluent to extend fragrances which are otherwise too potent for convenient use. Other common additives to bath salts are oils (agglomerating the salts to form amorphous granules, the product being called "bath beads" or "bath oil beads"), foaming agents, and effervescent agents. Bath salts may be packaged for sale in boxes or bags. Their appearance is often considered attractive or appealing, and they may be sold in transparent containers, showing off, for example, the needlelike appearance of sodium sesquicarbonate crystals.

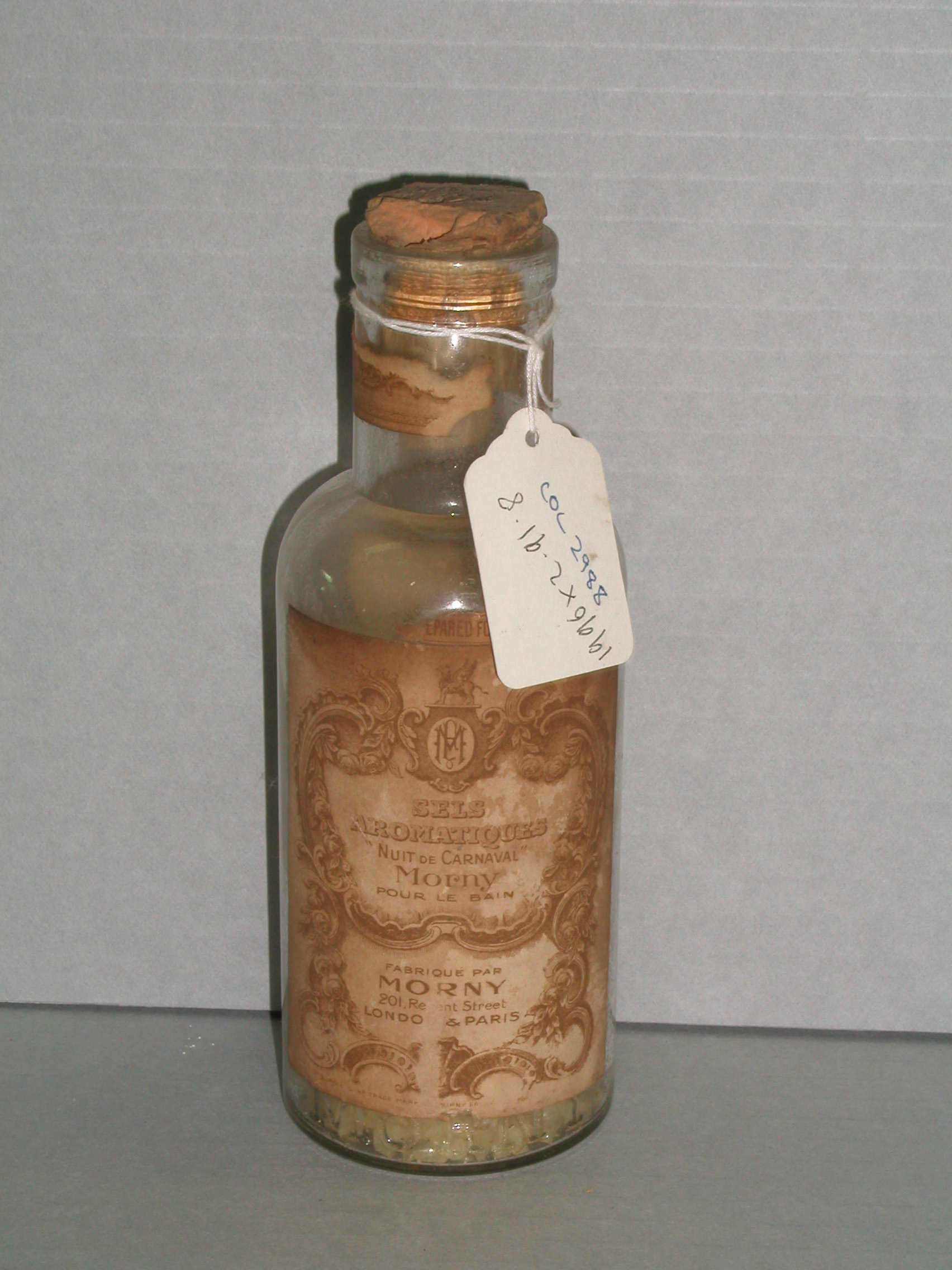
Bottle of bath salts by Morny, England

== Effects ==
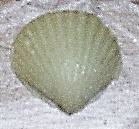
A bath salt tablet shaped like a seashell.

Some bath salts act as water softeners and change the way soap rinses.

High concentrations of salts increase the density of the water and increase buoyancy, which makes the body feel lighter in the bath. Very high concentrations of salts in water are used in many isolation tank therapies. Isolation tanks are special baths with enclosures which block out all light. Researchers have also studied their use in treating arthritis.

=== Bath fizzies ===
Bath fizzies are material products designed to effervesce in bathwater. They come in the form of amorphous grains of homogeneous mixture, packaged in a box, jar, or envelope; single-use envelopes of mixed powders; and solid boluses of homogeneous or inhomogeneous mixture called bath bombs. Bath fizzies are a form of bath salts in that the products of their use include a salt solution in addition to the carbon dioxide bubbles which are their definitive feature. Their ingredients must include one or more acid(s) and one or more water-soluble bicarbonate, sesquicarbonate, and/or carbonate. In addition they commonly include coloring, fragrance, and/or other water-soluble, water-dispersible, and/or volatile ingredients for esthetic, cosmetic, or skin soothing purposes. This principle of effervescing while releasing other ingredients is the same that has been used by tableted products for children to produce their own carbonated beverages.

=== As treatment ===
Even though bath additives containing emollient are sometimes suggested for the treatment atopic dermatitis, their use does not provide any benefits for the symptoms.

== Recreational drugs labeled 'bath salts' ==
A number of powdered recreational designer drugs are now named "bath salts", referring to an incident where illegal drugs were distributed in packages disguised as bath salts, often in shops selling drug paraphernalia such as head shops. The white powder, granules, or crystals often resemble true bath salts such as Epsom salts. The drugs' packaging often states "not for human consumption" in an effort to evade drug prohibition laws.

== See also ==
- Balneotherapy
- Bubble bath
- Heubad
- Mud bath
- Sea bathing
- 2-Aminoindane
