= Akhtala (disambiguation) =

Akhtala is a town in the Lori Province of Armenia.

Akhtala may also refer to:

- Akhtala (Gurjaani), a spa in Georgia
- Akhtala Monastery, in Akhtala, Armenia

== See also ==
- Verin Akhtala, a village in the Lori Province of Armenia
