= Gurjaani Municipality =

Coordinates: 41°45′N 45°48′E

- Municipality
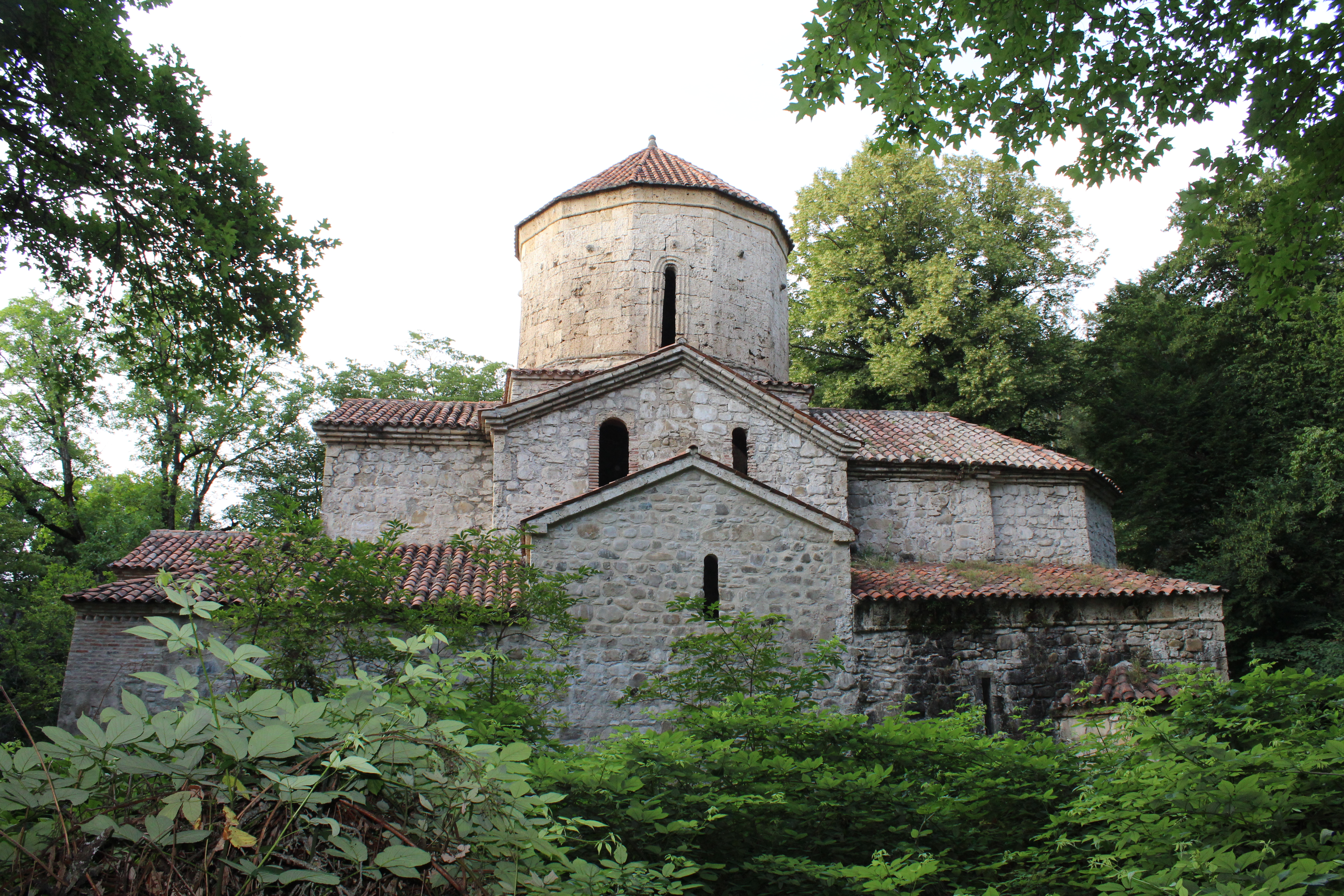
- Vachnadziani monastery

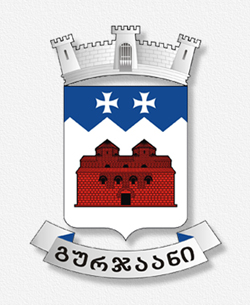
- Flag Seal

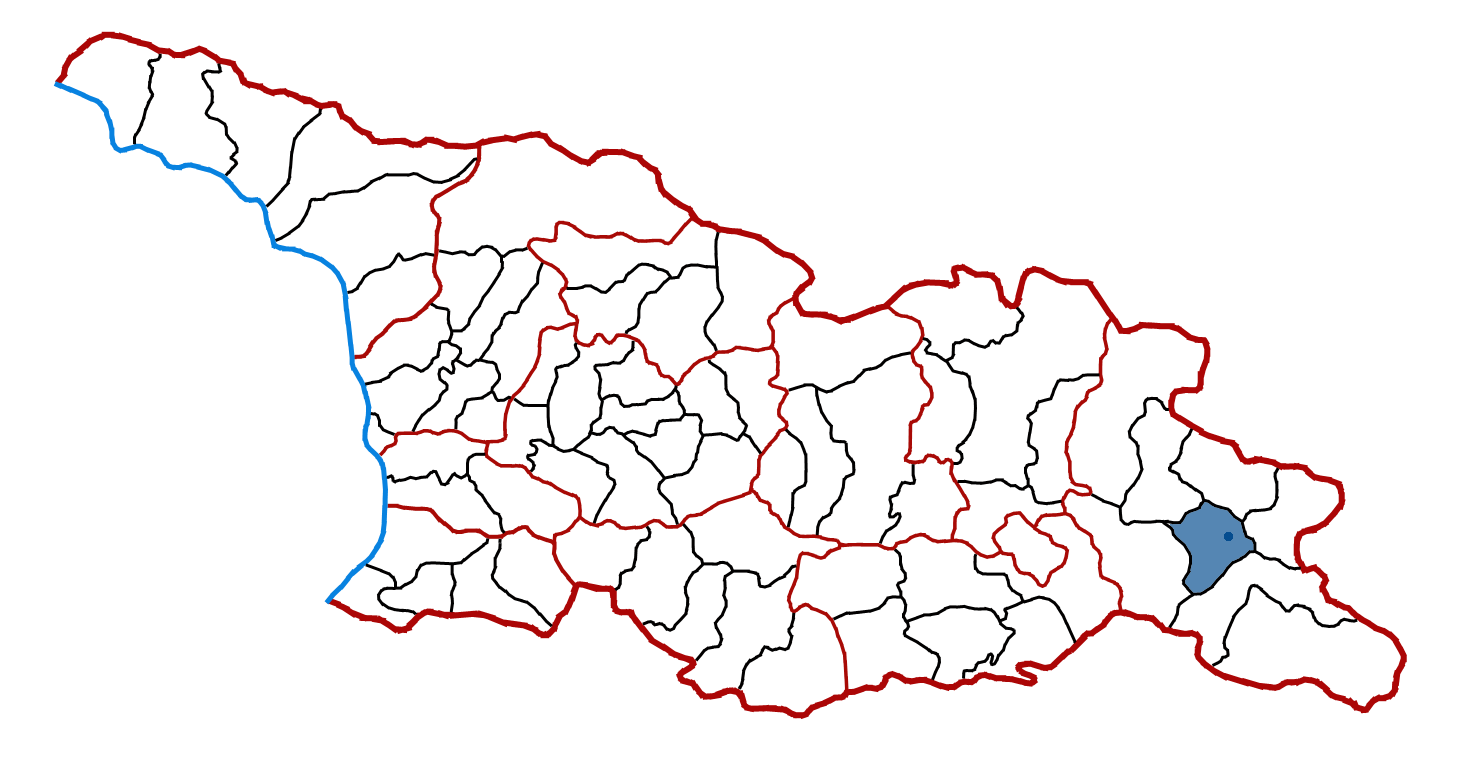
- Location of the municipality within Georgia
- Interactive map of Gurjaani Municipality
- Country: Georgia
- Region: Kakheti
- Capital: Gurjaani

Government
  - mayor: Zurab Utiashvili

Area
  - Land: 846 km^{2} (327 sq mi)

Population (2014)
  - Total: 54,337
- Time zone: UTC+4 (Georgian Standard Time)
- Website: www.gurjaani.gov.ge

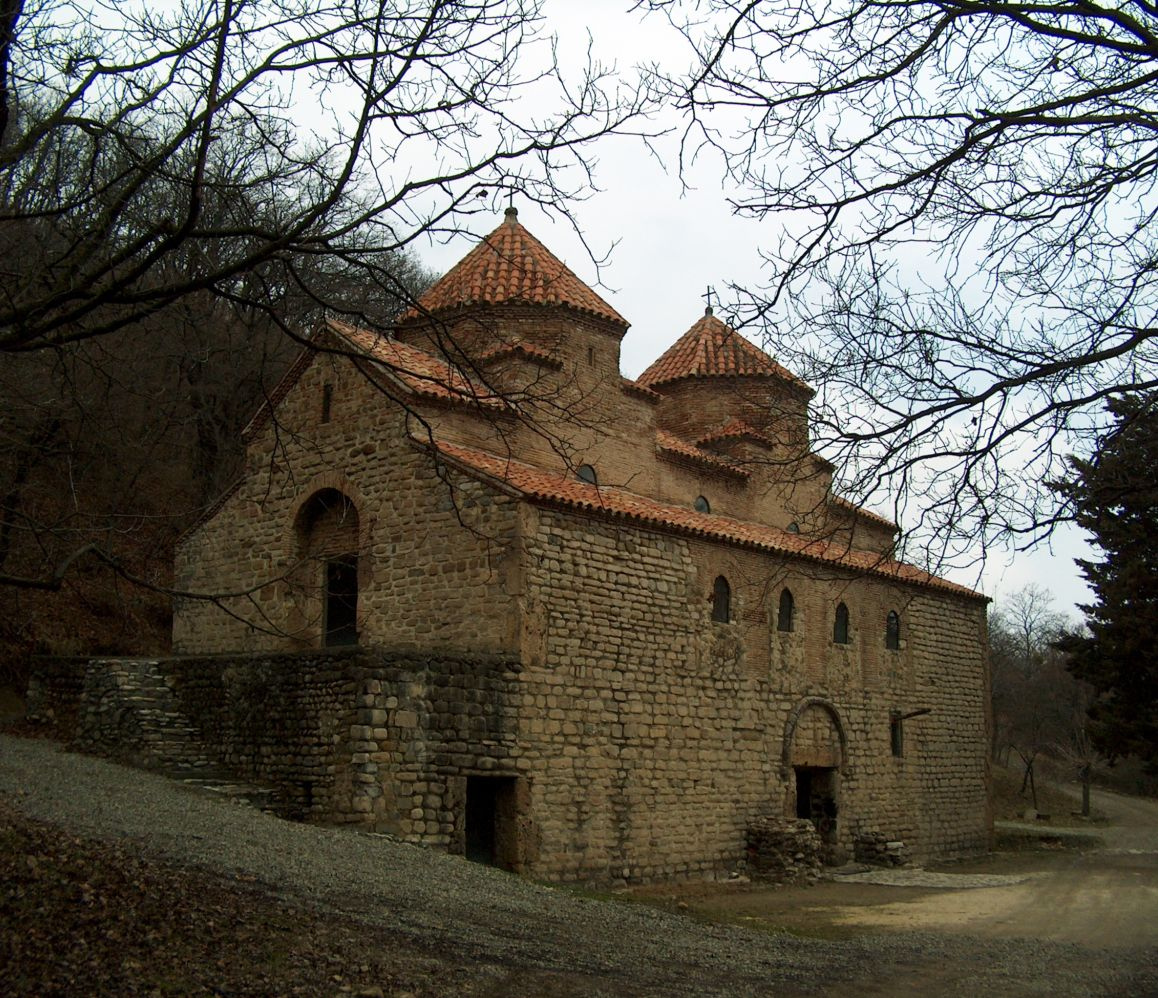
Gurjaani Kvelatsminda Church

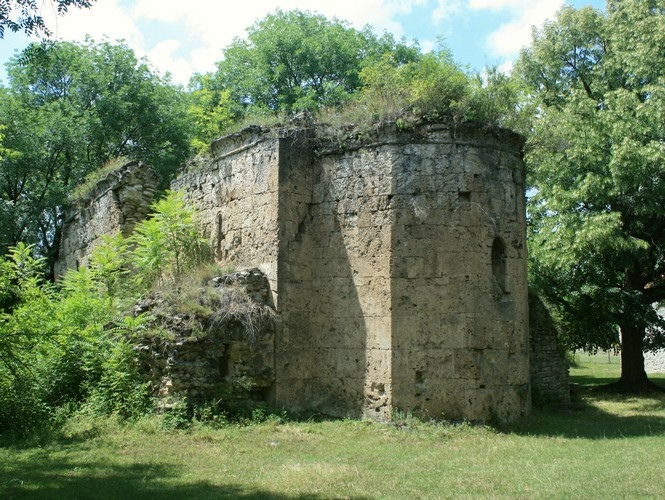
Cheremi historic site

Gurjaani (Georgian: გურჯაანის მუნიციპალიტეტი, Gurjaanis municiṗaliṫeṫi) is an administrative-territorial unit in eastern Georgia, Kakheti region. Until 1917, the territory of Gurjaani municipality was part of Telavi Mazra of Tbilisi Governorate; since 1921 it has been included in Telavi Mazra; Since 1930, it has been an independent district in Kakheti region, then it became a separate district. It has been a municipality since 2006.

The population was 54,337 as of the 2014 census, and it has an area of 846 km^{2} (327 sq mi).

== History ==
Gurjaani is a municipality located in the Kakheti region. It has been inhabited since ancient times; a stone age human settlement has been discovered. The municipality's territory was densely populated both in the Bronze Age and the Ancient and Feudal Ages. The name Gurjaani has a Turkish origin: the word "Gurj" is Turkish and means Georgian, and "Gurjaani" means a settlement of Georgians.

A large part of the territory of Gurjaani municipality was within Hereti under Saeristavo (principality) of Vejini. From the 70s of the 15th centuries, after the abolition of the principalities in Kakheti, there were several shrines (of Vejini, Veliszikhe, Kalauri, Shashiani, Akhasheni, Jimiti, Chumlaki and others).

== Administrative divisions and population ==
Gurjaani municipality is a set of settlements with administrative boundaries and an administrative centre - the city of Gurjaani. Gurjaani municipality has an elected representative (council) and an executive body (town hall), a registered population, property, budget, and income. The municipality is a legal entity under public law. The City Council and Mayor of Gurjaani Municipality are elected for a term of 4 years. The last elections were held in 2021.

Twenty-four administrative units are united in the municipality and is divided into one city (ქალაქი, kalaki), and 29 villages (სოფელი, sopeli):

=== Cities ===
- Gurjaani

=== Villages ===
- Akhasheni
- Velistsikhe
- Kardenakhi
- Bakurtsikhe
- Gurjaani
- Vazisubani
- Ziari
- Cheremi
- Qitaani
- Pkhoveli
- Naniani
- Jimiti
- Kachreti
- Makharadze
- Darcheti
- Kodalo
- Arashenda
- Melaani
- Chalaubani
- Kolagi
- Vejini
- Dzirkoki
- Chandari
- Chumlaqi
- Zegaani
- Mukuzani
- Shashiani
- Kalauri
- Vachnadzeani

== Geography and climate ==
Five other municipalities border Gurjaani Municipality. It borders Sagarejo Municipality to the west, Signagi Municipality to the southeast, Telavi Municipality to the northwest, Qvareli Municipality to the north, and Lagodekhi Municipality to the east. Gurjaani municipality is the smallest administrative-territorial unit within the Kakheti region. Its area is 846.0 km^{2}. Agricultural fields occupy 39,430 ha, and the total area covered by forest is 27,730 ha. The administrative centre is the city of Gurjaani.

The territory of Gurjaani municipality belongs to the region of moderate humid subtropical climate. The plain has a moderately humid climate with mild winters and hot summers in the east. Gombori ridge has a moderately humid climate characterized by a long summer. The Iori plateau has a dry subtropical steppe climate with moderately cold winters and hot summers.

The average annual temperature is 12.4 °C, the average temperature of the coldest month of the year, January, is 0.9 °C, and the average temperature of the hottest month, August, is 23.6 °C. The average annual volume of precipitation is up to 800 mm in most parts of the territory, and it decreases to 500-600 mm in the plateau part of the territory. The main river of the municipality is Alazani, with short tributaries of small water (Chermishkhevi, Shromiskhevi, Chalaubniskhevi, Tsiliana and others).

== Politics ==
Gurjaani Municipal Assembly (Georgian: გურჯაანის საკრებულო) is a representative body in Gurjaani Municipality. currently consisting of 39 members. The council is assembled into session regularly, to consider subject matters such as code changes, utilities, taxes, Municipal budget, oversight of Municipal government and more. Municipal Assembly and Mayor are elected every four year. The last election was held in October 2021.

| Party | 2017 | 2021 | Current Municipal Assembly |
|---|---|---|---|
| Georgian Dream | 31 | 28 | |
| United National Movement | 2 | 9 | |
| For Georgia | | 1 | |
| European Georgia | 5 | 1 | |
| Alliance of Patriots | 1 | | |
| Total | 39 | 39 | |

== Education ==
There are 25 public schools and 37 kindergartens in Gurjaani municipality. There are 13 libraries in Gurjaani municipality, and the library named after Shota Rustaveli, located in Gurjaani. A wine library functions based on this library.

== Culture ==
The house museum of the famous Georgian poet Ioseb Noneshvili operates in the village of Kardenakhi. The museum was opened in 1986.

The house museum of the famous Georgian film actor Nato Vachnadze has been open in the village of Gurjaani since 1981. Since 2008, the building has had the status of an immovable monument of cultural heritage.

The Village History Museum, named after Giorgi Maisuradze, is located in the village of Vachnadzian. The museum was opened in 1966 and is located in the residence of nobleman Levan Jandieri, which was built in 1889.

The Memorial Museum of Fame is located in the city of Gurjaan. The museum is a memorial complex and is dedicated to the memory of those who died in the Second World War. There is an amphitheatre on the territory of the museum, and there is a copper monument of "Father of a Soldier" weighing 80 tons and it is 20 meters high. A wall of lost in the war was built, where the names of fallen warriors are engraved.

The museum of Ivane Beritashvili, the famous Georgian academician, and the founder of the Physiological School in Georgia, has been opened in the village of Vejini.

A puppet theatre has been operating in the city of Gurjaan since 1987. Initially, the theatre functioned as a public puppet theatre on the basis of the House of Culture; now, it has the status of a state theatre.

The People's Theater has been operating in Velistsikhe village since 1885. The theatre is named after Vaso Godziashvili.

=== Festivals and public holidays ===
| Event | Date | Description |
|---|---|---|
| Gurjaani Wine Festival | - | The wine festival has been held in the city of Gurjaan since 2017. Festival guests can get to know, taste and buy wines of different types, colours and ageing produced by farmers, large and small wineries, together with chacha and other drinks. Various culinary products and handicrafts created by local entrepreneurs are exhibited at the festival. Fairs are organized. There are pavilions where visitors can learn about the process of pressing grapes and making Tatara. Local folklore and choreographic ensembles participate in the festival. |
| Gurjaani Fruit Festival | - | The annual festival aims to popularize the field of fruit growing in the Kakheti region and to support farmers and entrepreneurs working in this direction. Festival guests can taste and buy local seasonal fruits and natural juices, jams, dried fruits, alcoholic beverages and other products made from them. |
| Gurjaani Georgian Cheese and Culinary Festival | - | The festival aims to promote culinary as a field in the region. Within the festival's framework, Georgian and foreign chefs prepare dishes using modern technology and hold cooking master classes. At the same time, tasting and fair of Georgian cheese and cheese products are held. |

== Economy ==
The leading industry is agriculture, mainly viticulture and animal husbandry. Vine culture occupies 20% of agricultural land. The main branch of industry is winemaking; there are several wine and spirits factories in the municipality, as well as small enterprises of other profiles. Railways and highways pass through the territory of the municipality.

== Historical landmarks and sightseeing ==
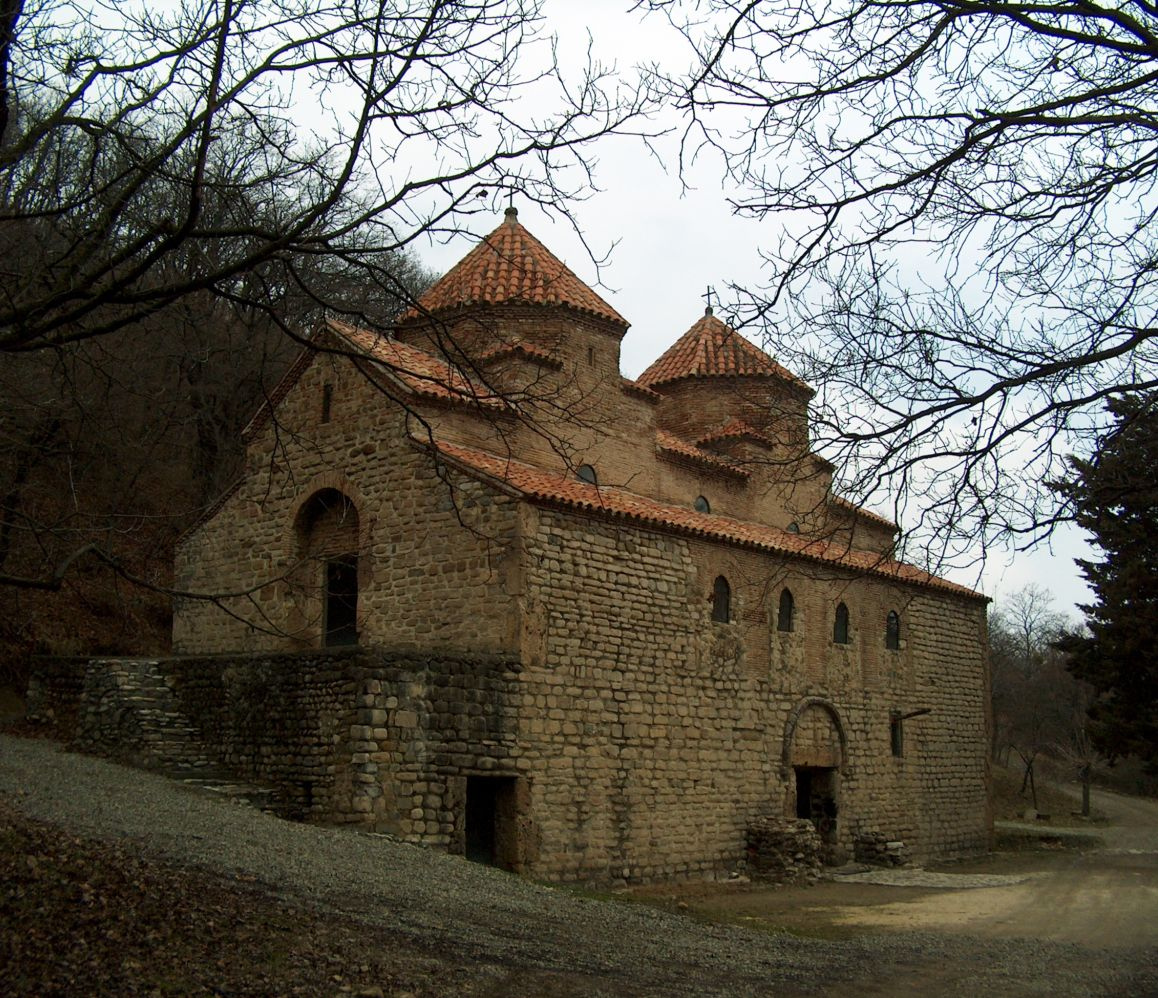
Gurjaani Kvelatsminda Church

A lot of historical architectural monuments have been preserved in the territory of Gurjaani municipality. One of their most important is the 8th-9th century Georgian monument, All Saints of Gurjaani, built with cobblestone. An important Georgian architectural monument is the Gurjaani Kvelatsminda Church, located a few kilometres from the village of Vachnadziani.

There is a fortress built of cobblestone near the village of Vejini. There are several churches inside the castle, among which the churches of Ascension of the Resurrection and St. Mary are worth mentioning.

The church of Sabatsminda from the 13th century is preserved near the village of Kardenakhi. The church is quite badly damaged. The Georgian architectural monument "Tsverdabali" stands near Cheremi; there is also Nakalakari.

Other historical monuments include the three-nave basilica of Vazisubani, the "Sanagire" monastery, etc.

== Notable people ==
Notable people of Gurjaani municipality
| Photo | name and surname | years | Description |
|---|---|---|---|
| | Kote Abkhazi | 1867-1923 | Georgian public, political and military figure |
| | Levan Mughalashvili | 1875-1955 | Georgian singer, Lotbar |
| | Ivane Beritashvili | 1885-1974 | Georgian academician, physiologist, founder of physiological school in Georgia |
| | Grigol Peradze | 1899-1942 | Georgian theologian, historian, archimandrite, professor. In 1995, he was canonized by the Georgian Orthodox Church |
| | Nato Vachnadze | 1904-1953 | Georgian film actor |
| | Ioseb Noneshvili | 1918-1980 | Georgian poet |
| | Karlo Koberidze | 1931-2017 | Georgian writer, poet |
| | Givi Berikashvili | 1933-2017 | Georgian theater and cinema actor |
| | John Malkhaz Shalikashvili | 1936-2011 | US Army General |
| | Rostom Saginashvili | 1940-2022 | Georgian singer (tenor) |
| | Mzia Davitashvili | 1949 | Vocalist, singer, teacher |
| | Revaz Mindorashvili | 1976 | Georgian athlete, Olympic, world and European champion in freestyle wrestling |
| | Maka Purtseladze | 1988 | Georgian chess player |

== Twin towns – sister Municipalities ==
- Piaseczno Municipality (Poland)
- Považská Bystrica District (Slovakia)
- Municipality of Laguardia (Spain)
- Pakruojis District Municipality (Lithuania)
- Kuusalu Parish (Estonia)
- Gorodok District of Vitebsk District (Belarus)
- Vinnytsia Oblast (Ukraine)

== See also ==
- List of municipalities in Georgia (country)
