= Radox =

Brand of personal care products

- Product type: Personal care
- Current owner: Unilever
- Country: United Kingdom
- Introduced: 1908; 118 years ago
- Markets: United Kingdom, Ireland, Czech Republic, Australia, Malaysia and South Africa
- Previous owners: Sara Lee Corporation
- Website: radox.co.uk

Radox is a brand of personal care products, best known for their range of bubble bath and shower gels. The brand was founded in the United Kingdom in 1908, and is now also available in Ireland, Czech Republic, Australia, Malaysia and South Africa. In September 2009 it was bought by Anglo-Dutch multinational Unilever from the Sara Lee Corporation.

== Products ==
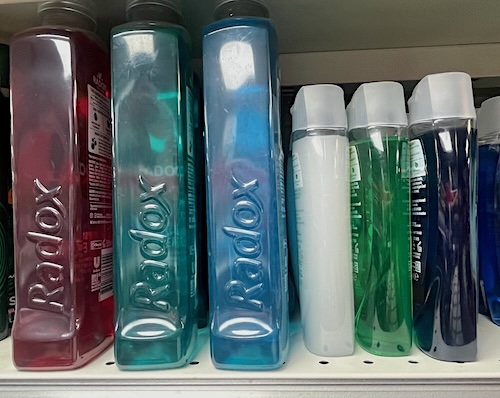
Bottles of bath cleanser and shower gel by Radox

The first product produced by Radox was a salts foot bath in 1908, which used the tagline that it "radiates oxygen". Nowadays, it produces many different products such as liquid soap, deodorant, shower gels, and a wide range of bubble baths, bath salts and muscle soaks.
