= Ziari =

Ziari ზიარი
- Location within Georgia
- Coordinates: 41°43′01″N 45°44′48″E
- Country: Georgia
- Region: Kakheti
- Municipality: Gurjaani
- Elevation: 820 m (2,690 ft)

Population (2014)
  - Total: 44
- Time zone: UTC+4 (Georgian Time)

Ziari (Georgian: ზიარი) is a village in Gurjaani Municipality, Kakheti region, Georgia. It is located 5 km south-west of Gurjaani, at an altitude of about 820 m. The population was 44 inhabitants in 2014.

Ziari has been the site of archaeological research since the 1960s. The numerous stone artifacts unearthed there testify to the presence of Paleolithic workshops.

== See also ==
- Kakheti
