= Mudbaden Sulphur Springs Company =

Former spa resort in Minnesota, United States

- U.S. National Register of Historic Places
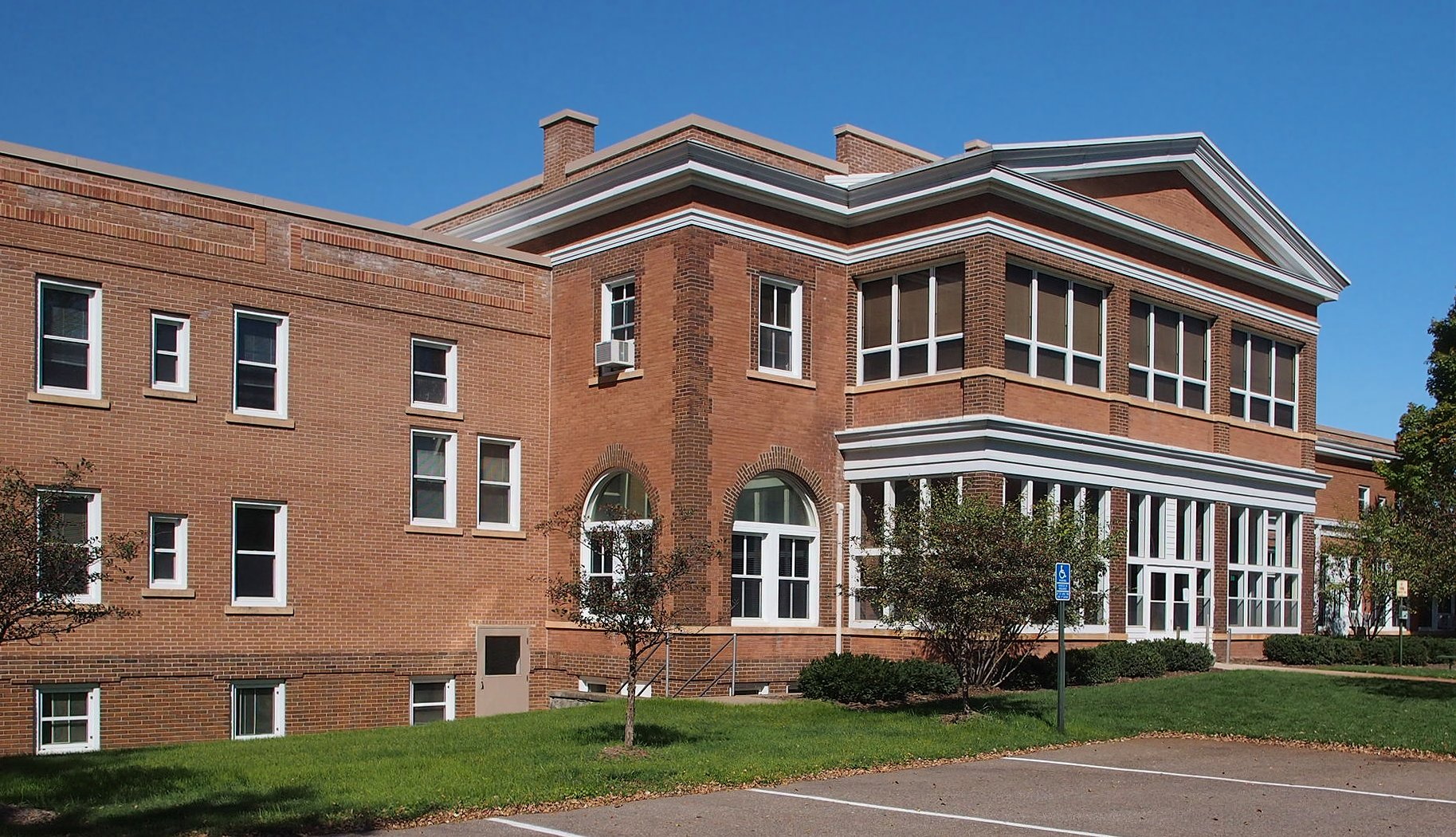
- The Mudbaden Sulphur Springs Company building from the south

- Location within Minnesota Location within the United States
- Location: 17706 Valley View Drive, Mudbaden, Minnesota
- Nearest city: Jordan, Minnesota
- Coordinates: 44°41′35″N 93°37′1″W
- Area: 10 acres (4.0 ha)
- Built: 1915
- Architectural style: Neoclassical
- MPS: Scott County MRA
- NRHP reference No.: 80002165
- Added to NRHP: April 17, 1980

The Mudbaden Sulphur Springs Company is a former destination spa in Mudbaden, Minnesota, United States. It operated from the 1890s to 1952, and its 1915 building is the best preserved of three spa resorts that operated in the area. The property was listed on the National Register of Historic Places in 1980 for its significance in the themes of entertainment/recreation and health/medicine. It was nominated for being a well-preserved example of an early-20th-century health resort.

== Description ==
The Mudbaden Sulphur Springs Company building is located in a rural part of the Minnesota River valley two miles (3 km) northeast of Jordan, Minnesota. Railroad tracks run directly in front of the building and the river is a mile to the northwest. The facility is a large, two-story building of brick with a central section flanked by long, narrow wings. The layout is a common one for early-20th-century institutional buildings. The main façade is 425 feet (130 m) long. Outside it displays Neoclassical features such as a pediment, wide arches, white wood trim along the cornice, and decorative quoining in polychrome brickwork. Inside it contained a massive lobby with two fireplaces and oak woodwork, a large dining room, a state-of-the-art kitchen, a 70-by-40-foot (21 by 12 m) recreation hall, four steam-heated sun porches, and two open verandas.

== History ==
Ole Rosendahl claimed an 80-acre (32 ha) homestead here in the 1890s despite it being swampy, marginal farmland filled with smelly mud from sulfur-rich springs along the Minnesota River. According to Rosendahl, a peddler crossing the land got stuck in the mud one day. Familiar with the successful commercialization of sulfur springs in his native Germany, the peddler congratulated the struggling farmer on his good fortune. Rosendahl began offering mud baths in his home. Sulfur was then believed to treat arthritis, skin conditions, allergies, infections, and other ailments. Scientific advancements were making anything seem possible, and patent medicines were big business. Rosendahl Sulphur Springs thrived despite competition from Jordan Sulphur Springs a mile away and Mudcura across the Minnesota River in Carver County. Rosendahl moved his spa operations into a large, two-story house he had transported onto the property. In 1908 Ole Rosendahl turned the burgeoning spa over to his more business-minded son O.J., who in turn brought on board Dr. T.M. Larsen, a charismatic Danish chiropractor with a talent for promotion.

In 1910 O.J. Rosendahl and Dr. Larsen initiated construction of what is now the oldest surviving section of the building. The 124-by-24-foot (37.8 by 7.3 m) facility had space for up to 70 patients at a time, with hot and cold running water and steam heat in each room. To advertise it they mailed a promotional pamphlet to every practicing doctor in Minnesota and many in neighboring states. The following year they officially bought the land and facilities from O.J.'s father for $30,000 (equivalent to $1,036,607 in 2025), changing the name to Mudbaden Sulphur Springs. They marketed Mudbaden as a luxury resort as much as a medical facility, with banquets and dances in addition to mud baths. In 1912 the rail line running past the property added a train station with daily service for spa visitors. Larsen bought out O.J. Rosendahl in 1913, then sold most of his interest to a new ownership group the next year. Mudbaden continued to prosper, adding electric lighting and summer cottages. In 1915 the main building was expanded by 242 feet (74 m)—increasing capacity to 200 patients—and daily bus service running from Minneapolis to Jordan began.

Throughout the years, the mud was harvested in the same way—dug up with a hand-operated crane and transported into the spa building in a rail cart. There a gas-powered mixer helped remove vegetation and rocks. The mud was then heated and poured three to six inches (8 to 20 cm) deep onto steel tables in the sex-segregated mud rooms. Patients lay on these and attendants covered everything but their faces with additional mud. Afterwards patients cleaned off in a tub, drank sulfur-infused water, and moved to a cooling room for a massage. Mud baths were only given in the morning. The afternoons and evenings were for relaxation and entertainment.

The Mudbaden Sulfur Springs Company continued to grow through the 1920s. In 1924 it boasted four doctors, four nurses, three masseurs, a lab technician, and 42 hospitality workers and mud harvesters. The spa also had facilities for x-rays and surgeries.

Patronage declined during the Great Depression and World War II. A new owner acquired the business in 1948, but mud treatments had fallen out of fashion and Mudbaden Sulphur Springs closed on July 1, 1952. The facility became a Roman Catholic seminary affiliated the University of Notre Dame. In 1969 it became Lynnhurst, a residential treatment center for alcohol and drug use disorders. Scott County purchased the building in 1985, initially as a minimum-security jail, but soon converted it to a regional training facility for law enforcement, firefighting, and other public services.

== See also ==
- National Register of Historic Places listings in Scott County, Minnesota
