= Bela Chekurishvili =

Poet from Georgia

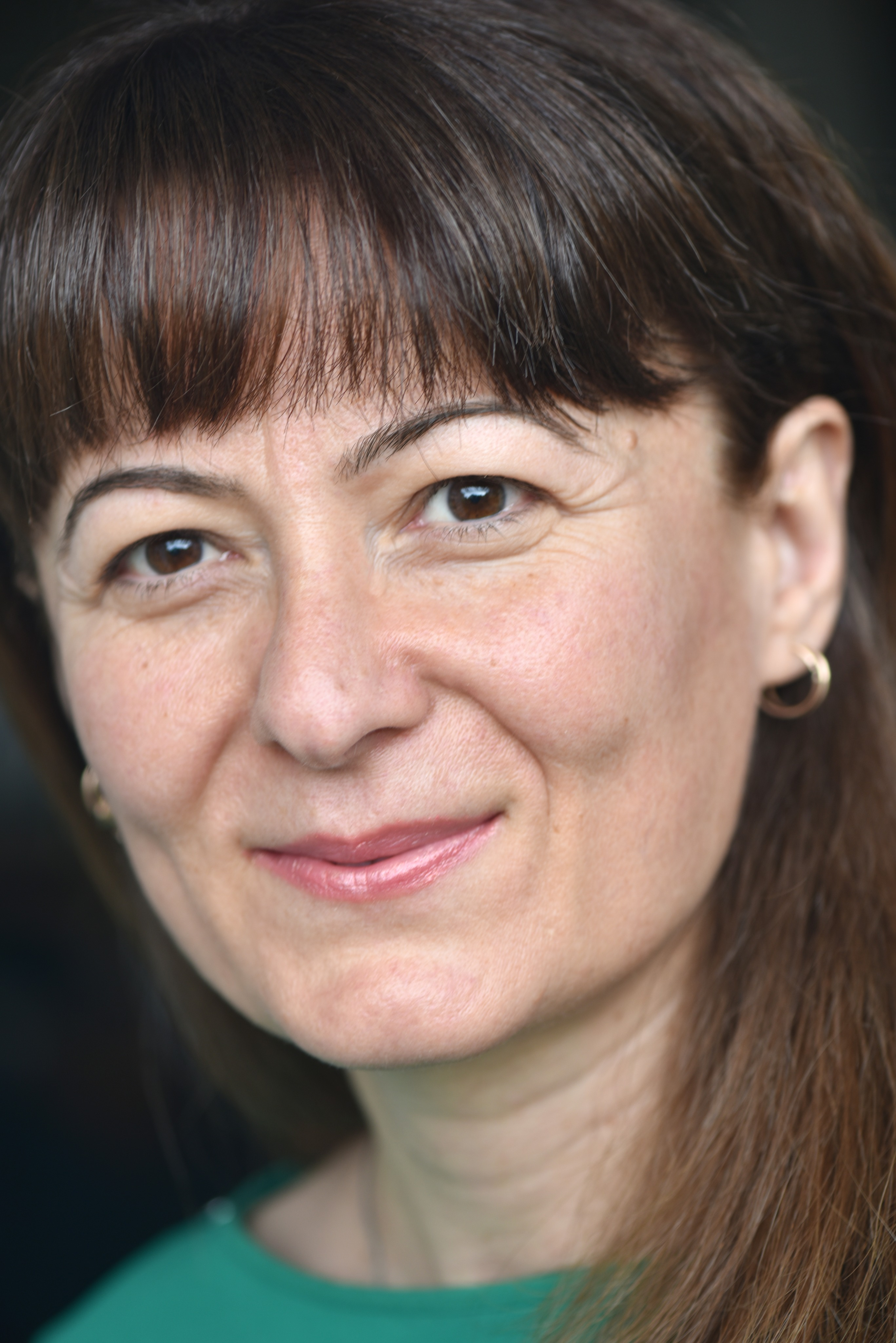
- Chekurishvili in 2018
- Born: Bela Chekurishvili; 25 December 1974 (age 51); Vachnadziani, Georgian SSR, USSR
- Occupations: poet, short story writer, journalist
- Writing career
- Genre: poetry
- Notable works: We, the Apple trees, (2016)
- Literary movement: Postmodernism, Metamodernism
- Website: book.gov.ge/en/author/chekurishvili-bela/147

Bela Chekurishvili (Georgian: ბელა ჩეკურიშვილი; born 25 December 1974) is a poet and journalist from Georgia.

== Biography ==
Chekurishvili was born on 25 December 1974 in Vachnadziani, Gurjaani. After finishing school she studied Georgian language and literature at Tbilisi State University. From 1998 to 2013, Chekurishvili worked as a journalist, for various magazines and newspapers in Georgia. She then began further PhD study on comparative literature, hosted by Tbilisi State University and the University of Bonn. In her spare time she is a mountaineer.

Chekurishvili's poetry was first published in 1989. She writes in Georgian and German and her work has been translated into Russian, Italian, French and English. In her poetry she depicts everyday life: from lumberjacks to prostitutes, housewives to refugees. Her poetry is published in several volumes and she has also published a volume of short stories.

== Books ==
- Mein kleines Insektarium, Distillery Verlag, Berlin, 2022
- Nana's horse, Intelekti Publishing, 2020
- Barefoot, Wunderhorn Publishing, Heidelberg, 2018
- Picnic on the mountain (with linocuts by Zoppe Voskuhl), Corvinus Presse Berlin, 2018
- Detector of nudity, Intelekti Publishing, 2016
- We, the Apple trees, Wunderhorn Publishing, Heidelberg, 2016
- Tales from the banks of the Rhine, Intelekti Publishing, 2016
- Sisyphus' Question, Diogene Publishing, 2012
- Postcards, Meridiani Publishing, 2009
- Either – Or, Leta Publishing, 1998
- Gastspiel für Mickey Mouse (ed.), Dağyeli Verlag Berlin, 2025, ISBN 978-3-910948-08-2
