= Velistsikhe =

Velistsikhe ველისციხე (Georgian)
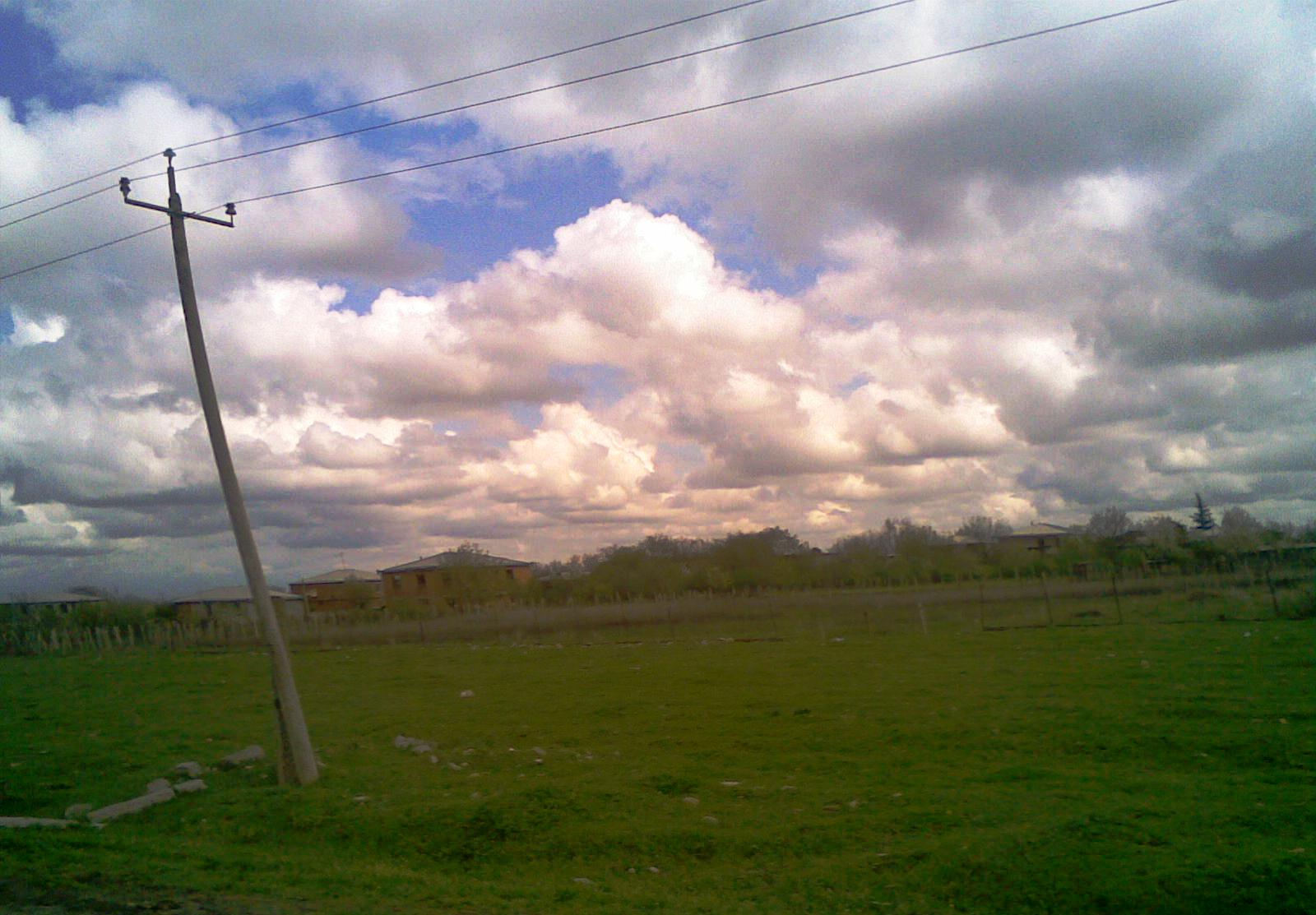

- Location within Georgia
- Coordinates: 41°48′33″N 45°45′15″E
- Country: Georgia
- Region: Kakheti
- Municipality: Gurjaani
- Elevation: 380 m (1,250 ft)

Population (2014)
  - Total: 4,508
- Time zone: UTC+4 (Georgian Time)

Velistsikhe (Georgian: ველისციხე) is a village in Georgia. It is located in the Gurjaani Municipality of Kakheti. In 2014, its population was 4,508. It is located 380 metres (1,250 ft) above sea level.

== See also ==
- Kakheti

== See also ==
- Census of village population of Georgia (PDF) (in Georgian)
