= Mud wrap =

Type of spa treatment

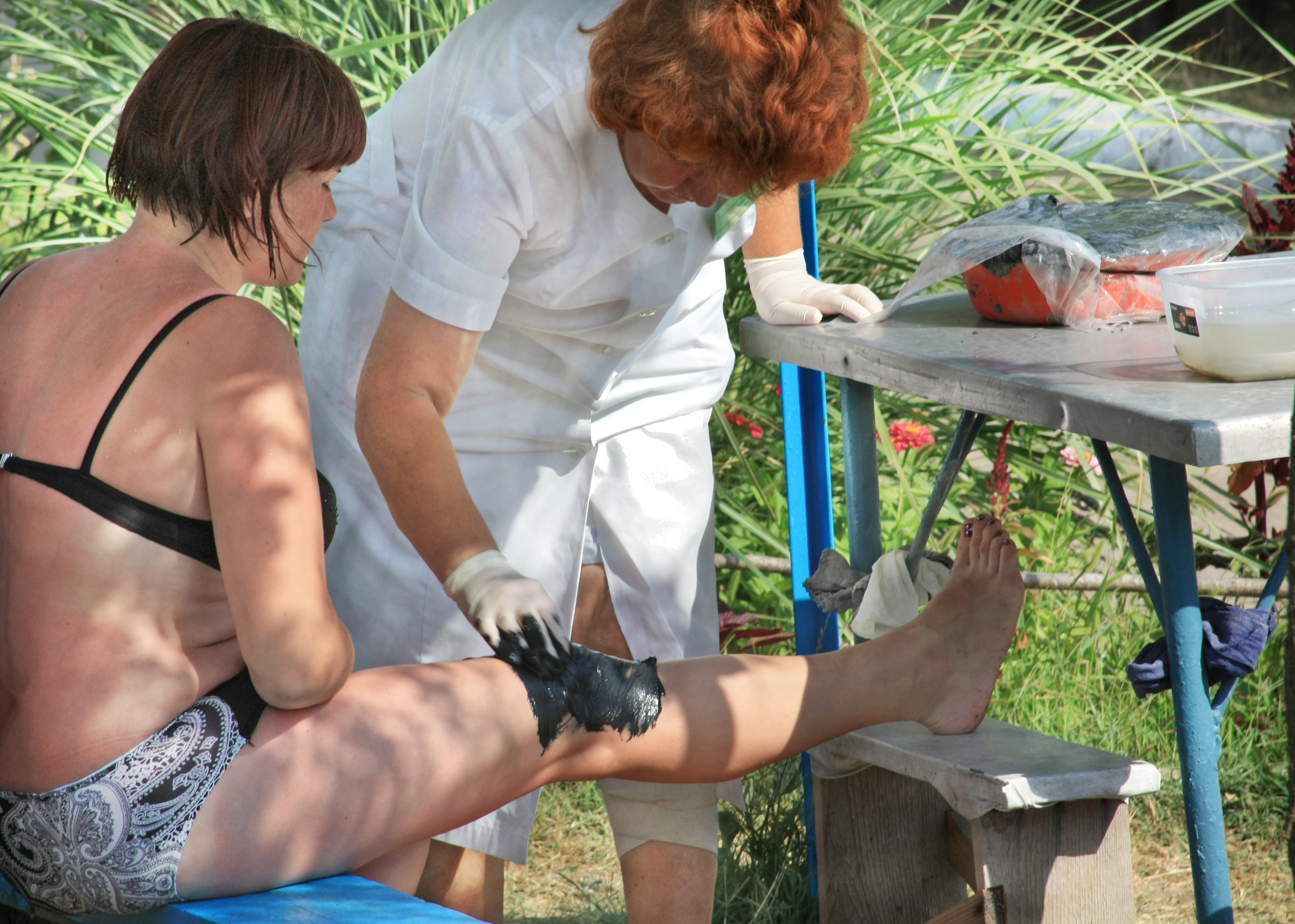
Applying therapeutic mud on a woman's leg

Mud wraps are spa treatments where the skin is covered in mud for a shorter or longer period. The mud causes sweating, and proponents claim that mud baths can slim and tone the body, hydrate or firm the skin, or relax and soothe the muscles. It is alleged that some mud baths are able to relieve tired and aching joints, ease inflammation, or help to "flush out toxins" through sweating.

== Process ==
A layer of mud is applied to the skin, and bandages are wrapped over the mud that has been applied. Sometimes a pvc sauna suit is additionally used to contain the mud.

The U.S. Food and Drug Administration has warned against body wraps as a method of weight reduction, noting that "such treatment will cause a loss of inches and perhaps pounds due to profuse perspiration. But the reductions are temporary. The fluid is soon replaced by drinking or eating. But rapid and excessive fluid loss is potentially dangerous because it can bring on severe dehydration and can upset the balance of important electrolytes in the body. ... Wraps have no effect on fat deposits and will not dissolve fat, even temporarily. Fat is not broken down by perspiration, only when fewer calories are consumed than are needed to meet the body's energy requirements."

== See also ==
- Body treatment
- Mud bath
