= Mudbaden, Minnesota =

Mudbaden
- Unincorporated community
- The Mudbaden Sulphur Springs Company building in Mudbaden

- Location within Minnesota Location within the United States
- Coordinates: 44°41′30″N 93°37′04″W
- Country: United States
- State: Minnesota
- County: Scott
- Township: Sand Creek Township
- Elevation: 735 ft (224 m)
- Time zone: UTC-6 (Central (CST))
  - Summer (DST): UTC-5 (CDT)
- ZIP code: 55352
- Area code: 952
- GNIS feature ID: 654838

Mudbaden is an unincorporated community in Sand Creek Township, Scott County, Minnesota, United States.

The community is located north-northeast of Jordan along Valley View Drive.

Nearby is the junction of U.S. Highway 169 and 173rd Street West.

Nearby places include Jordan and Shakopee. The community was noted for its sulfur springs and former spas at the Mudbaden Sulphur Springs Company from the 1890s to 1947.
