= Cheremi historic site =

- ჭერემის ნაქალაქარი (Georgian)
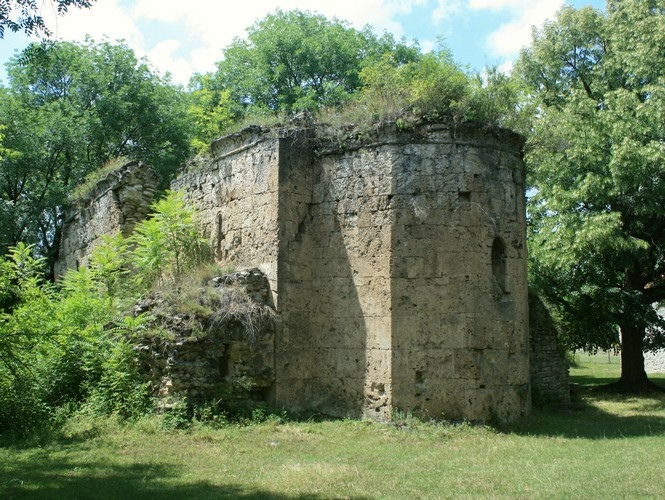
- A church at Cheremi.

- Location within Georgia
- 41.767333°N 45.559762°E
- Location: Cheremi, Gurjaani Municipality; Kakheti, Georgia

Immovable Cultural Monument of National Significance of Georgia
- Type: Archaeological, historic
- Designated: 2007

The Cheremi historic site (Georgian: ჭერემის ნაქალაქარი, romanized: ch'eremis nakalakari, literally, "the ruined/former city of Cheremi") is a historic and archaeological site in eastern Georgia, situated in and around the modern village of Cheremi, Gurjaani Municipality, in the region of Kakheti. The site encompasses the ruins of churches, a castle with a circuit wall, and burials. Parts of these ruins correspond to the extinct town of Cheremi known from the early medieval Georgian chronicles and are inscribed on the list of the Immovable Cultural Monuments of National Significance.

== History ==
Cheremi is located on the Chermistsqali, a right-bank tributary of the Alazani River, on the northeastern slopes of the Gombori Range. In Late Antiquity, this area was a strategical borderland between Kartli—Iberia of the Classical sources—and Albania. The first recorded mention of Cheremi occurs in the chronicle of Juansher, composed c. 800, which credits Vakhtang Gorgasali, the late 5th-century king of Kartli, with building two churches at Cheremi and a citadel between them. Vakhtang is also reported to have bestowed "the city of Cheremi" upon his elder son, Dachi. Later in Vakhtang's reign, the fortress of Cheremi was destroyed in a Persian attack. Cheremi never fully recovered but retained its function as the seat of a bishop into the 18th century. Troubled by lekianoba, a series of marauding inroads from Dagestan, the Cheremi area had virtually been depopulated by 1757, when its episcopal sea was dissolved and the territory assigned to the neighboring Georgian eparchies of Alaverdi, Bodbe, and Ninotsminda.

== Archaeology and layout ==
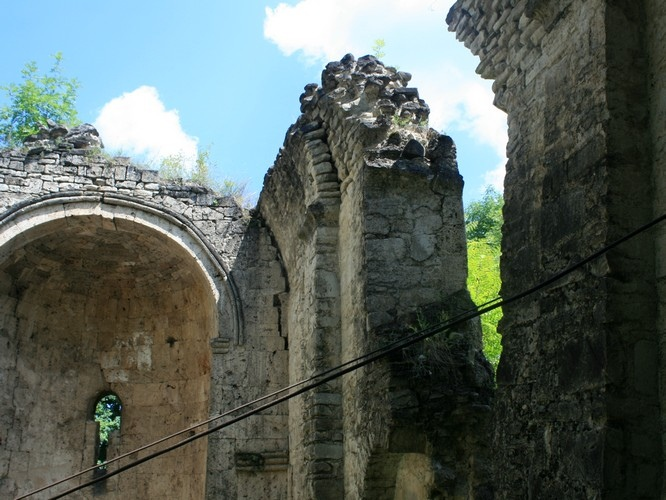
Ruins of Cheremi.

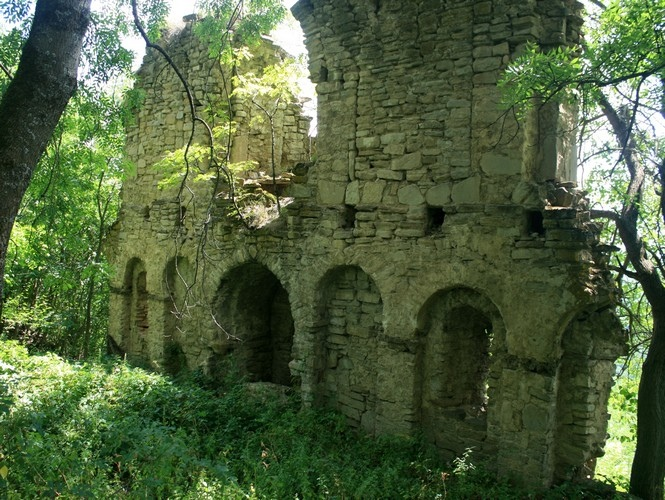
Ruins of Cheremi.

A quest for the ancient city of Vakhtang Gorgasali's times led to an archaeological expedition in the newly revived village of Cheremi in 1979. It unearthed layers from the Late Bronze to the High Middle Ages, among them several stone cist burials, mostly collective, dated to the period between the 3rd and 7th century AD, some of them containing pottery, jewelry, and Roman coins. A 4th–5th century hall church, that of Saint Marina, was also revealed in this territory.

The ruins of the town of Late Antiquity, associated by the medieval chronicles with Vakhtang Gorgasali, was found on a hill some 5 km west of the modern village. The remains of old Cheremi include a citadel, occupying the area of 10 ha, with the ruins of a castle, palace, churches, a circuit wall, and other structures.

The Cheremi castle was located on a rocky promontory at the western edge of the hill. Occupying the area of 300 sq. m, it consisted of six chambers, 2 corridors, and a tower. East of this building, there was a palace, with the dimensions of 30.50 × 15.70 m. It had three halls, each with a doorway opening to the south. Both these buildings were built of large stone blocks and roofed with red tiles. Further east, a wall led down to the riverbed; the southern segment was a double wall, containing a city gate, with a cobblestone road running through it.

Two churches stand on the territory of the ruined Cheremi fortress. One, that of Saint Barbara, is a now-restored hall church, stylistically dated to the late 5th century. It was part of the palace complex. The other is named after Saint George and is also known as Tsverodabali after a small hill it is perched on. This early medieval church, measuring 10.27 × 3.74 m and built of dressed sandstone blocks, is also a hall church, with a semicircular apse, horseshoe conch arch, and a heavily damaged ambulatory.

The cathedral of Saint Nicholas, in the centre of the modern village, is a three-aisle basilica, with a pentagonal projecting apse in the middle aisle and semicircular apses in the north and south aisles. It was probably built in the 10th or 11th century, on the site of an older church. The south facade of the north aisle bear a stone inscription in the medieval Georgian asomtavruli script, mentioning "the catholicos Melchizedek". Adjacent of the church are the ruins of a square domed building—demolished by the Communist anti-religion activists in 1924—an oldest Christian shrine or a former Zoroastrian altar. East of the village, at a cemetery, there is a 5th–6th-century church of Saint David—a three-aisle basilica of which survives only the middle nave with a horseshoe apse.
