= Akhtala (Gurjaani) =

Akhtala ახტალა
- Spa
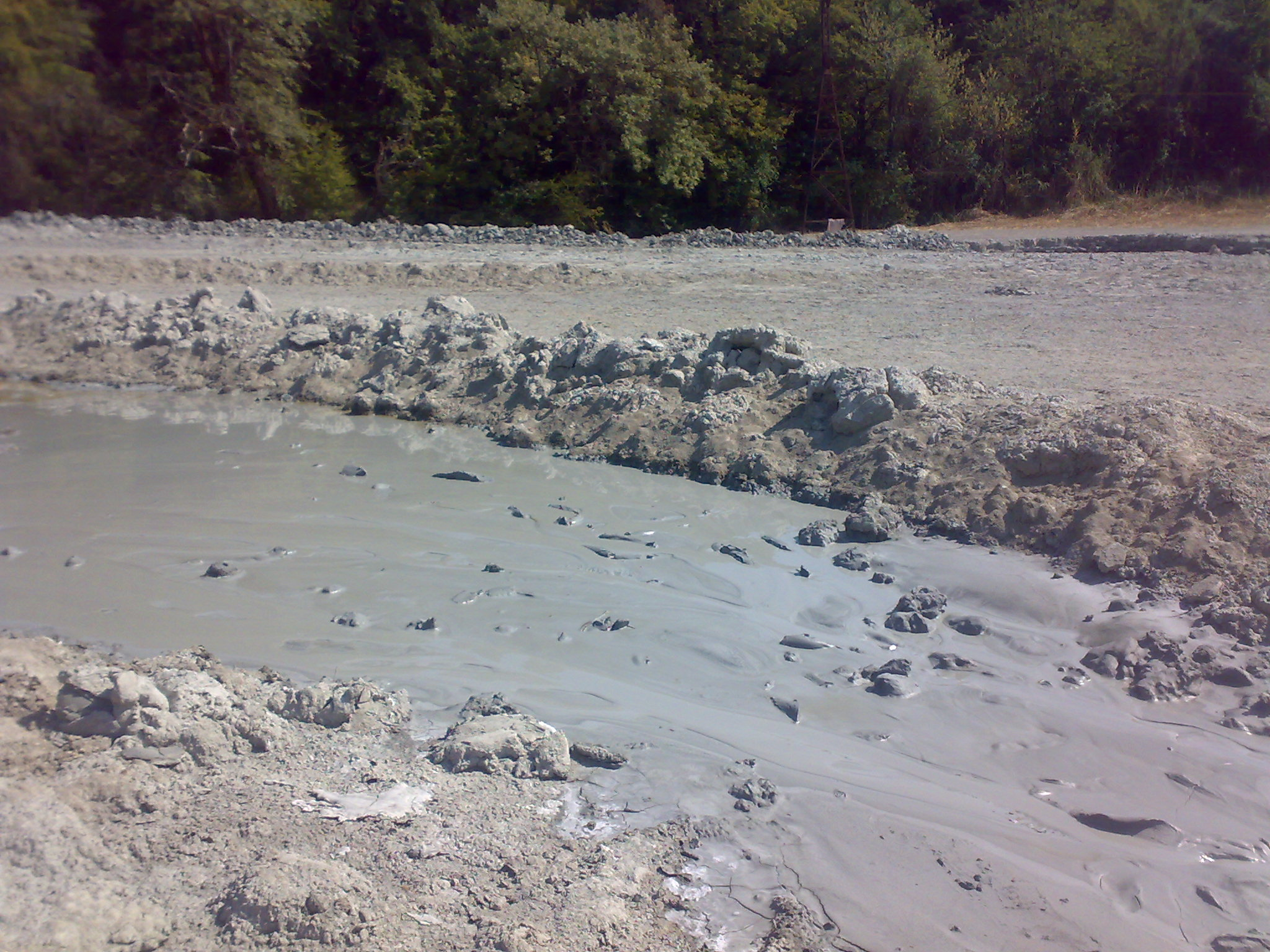
- Akhtala mud bathes

- Location of Akhtala
- Coordinates: 41°44′44″N 45°47′40″E
- Country: Georgia
- Region: Kakheti
- Municipality: Gurjaani
- Elevation: 412 m (1,352 ft)
- Website: akhtala.ge

Akhtala (Georgian: ახტალა) is a spa in the town of Gurjaani, in Georgia's easternmost region of Kakheti, known for its mud bathes of volcanic origin.

== History ==
According to the Georgian scholar Prince Vakhushti of Kartli's geography of Georgia, finalized in 1745, Akhtala "is said to be a former village and buried by wrath; tar is discharged, steaming, and brings on the surface spoons, jars, and peasants' commodities". By the time the British diplomat Oliver Wardrop visited Georgia in 1887, Akhtala had already been used as a spa, "a muddy hollow in which are slime baths, resorted to by persons suffering from rheumatism, scrofula, and many other diseases; the baths are simply round holes full of mud, in the middle of which an evil-smelling gas slowly bubbles up; the largest bath of all is reserved for cattle".

Beginning in the 1920s, Akhtala's potential for balneotherapy was studied and exploited by the Georgian Institute of Resorts and Physiotherapy. In the 1990s, the Akhtala spa became a joint stock company. In 2006, descendants of the noble family of Andronikashvili attempted to claim the resort, fruitlessly, as their patrimonial estate lost to the Soviet state in 1924.
