= Bubble bath =

Filled bathtub with a layer of foam

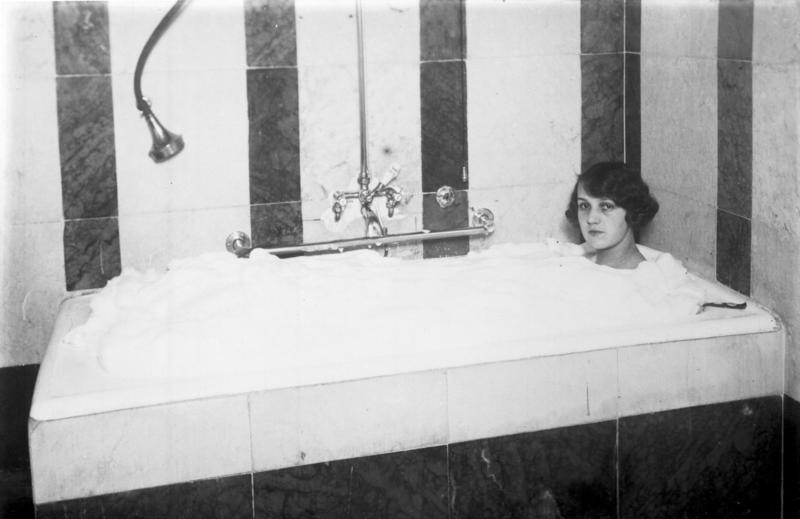
A woman in a bubble bath (Berlin, February 1930)

A bubble bath is a filled bathtub with a layer of soap bubbles on the surface of the water. Less commonly, aerated or carbonated baths are called bubble baths.

Bubbles on top of the water, less ambiguously known as a foam bath (see photo), can be obtained by adding a product containing foaming surfactants to water and temporarily aerating it by agitation (often merely by the fall of water filling the tub). The practice is popular for personal bathing because of the belief that it cleanses the skin, that the foam insulates the bath water, keeping it warm for longer, and (as a lime soap dispersant) prevents or reduces deposits on the bath tub at and below the water level (called "bathtub ring" and soap scum, respectively) produced by soap and hard water. It can hide the body of the bather, preserving modesty or, in theatre and film, giving the appearance that a performer who is actually clothed is bathing normally. Children often find bubble baths enjoyable, so they are an enticement to get them into the bathtub.

Surfactant preparations for this purpose are themselves called "bath foam", "foaming bath", or "bubble bath", and frequently contain ingredients for additional purposes common to bath enhancers. Used at much higher concentration (for instance on a washcloth), such preparations (especially in liquid format) may also be used to wash skin or hair, so they are sometimes marketed for combined purposes; in a few cases, mild household detergents for hand washing of articles have also been labeled for such purposes, or for preventing soap scum on the bathtub (with or without foaming).

== History ==
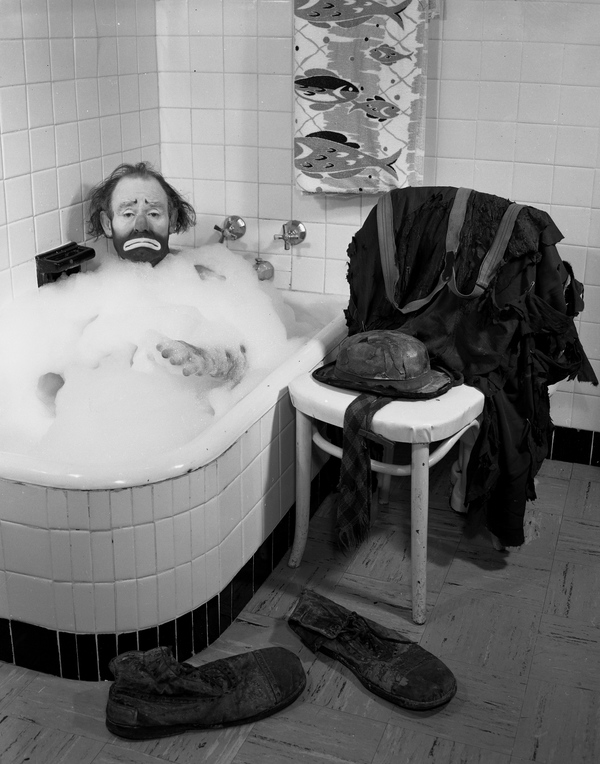
Circus clown Emmett Kelly in a bubble bath, photographed by Joseph Janney Steinmetz (c. 1955)

The earliest foam baths were foamed with soap, a practice which came about shortly after soap flakes were marketed. Saponins were also used to foam machine-aerated baths. Foam baths became more popular with later surfactants; an early publicized use of an alkyl sulfate surfactant as bath foam was in the original 1936 production of the play The Women, but it is possible that a similar composition was used to produce foams seen in bath photos since the marketing of Dreft in 1933. Foam baths became standard practice for bathing children after the mass marketing of products so positioned in supermarkets during the 1960s and thereabouts, Bub and Matey in the United States having been marketed shortly before 1960. The dubious claim had been made that their normal use (diluted in a tubful of water) would substitute for soap and/or rubbing to clean skin.

=== Compositions ===
Preparations to produce a foam bath must be able at high dilution in water of common "hardness" to produce a foam and hold it for a useful duration. This is practically always done primarily by the action of an anionic, nonionic, or zwitterionic surfactant. Among cation surfactants betaines can be used in foam baths, but at their isoelectric point they are incompatible with anionic surfactants. In general cationic surfactants are not used as most of them are not compatible with anionic surfactants and are not good foaming agents. Main function of cationic surfactants is conditioning and are hence used more in personal care products such as shampoos and conditioners. Amphoteric surfactants or zwitterionic surfactants like alkyl amido alkyl amine (CAPB) are used. Typically a mixture of different surfactants is used. Of the anionics, soap is not a common deliberate constituent of bath foam preparations because they react rapidly with "hardness" cations in water to produce lime soaps, which are anti-foams. Usually one or more ingredients is primarily a foam stabilizer—a substance which retards the breakage of foams; these may themselves be surfactants or film-stabilizing polymers. Some surfactants used in foaming preparations may have a combination of foam-producing and foam-stabilizing properties. Surfactants used in bath foam preparations may also be included for primarily non-foaming purposes: solubilization of other components in the manufacturing of a liquid product, or lime soap dispersion to prevent bathtub ring when used with soap.

Bath foam preparations may be in the form of liquid (or gel) with water, or as solids in the form of powders, grains, or tablets. Liquids must be formulated to retain uniformity as solution or otherwise on storage at expected temperatures, and preserved against microbial growth and oxidative breakdown. Powders may contain various solid diluent ingredients which in some cases will have liquid components adsorbed to them, and have their own challenges in terms of retaining uniformity against sifting of different densities of components. For various reasons, although powdered products were more common at first, liquids have come to dominate the market.

Liquid and solid bath foam preparations may also include ingredients for purposes other than foaming, similarly to bath salts and oils. Formulation is also directed at minimizing adverse effects on the skin and exposed mucous membranes of bathers. Sometimes foaming ability is compromised to achieve mildness or non-foaming effects such as emolliency.

== Aerated and carbonated baths – bubbles in water ==
Bubbles in the water can be produced either by aerating it mechanically (in some cases using jets that also move the water) using equipment installed permanently or temporarily in a bathtub, hot tub, or pool, or by producing gas in the water in a bathtub through the use of effervescent solids. The latter can come as small pellets known as bath fizzies or as a bolus known as a bath bomb, and they produce carbon dioxide by reaction of a bicarbonate or carbonate with an organic acid. Fizzing bath products came into use as effervescent bath salts early in the 20th century; the bath bomb became a popular form late in that century.

Bath fizzies are infeasible as liquids because of the inability to keep the mixture from reacting prematurely. This is a distinction from foam bath (see above) preparations, which may be supplied as liquids or solids.

Machine-aerated baths originated in the early 20th century for therapeutic use, becoming more widely used with the introduction of the jacuzzi. Trends merged when the hot tub, which originally had still water, with its increasing popularity became more commonly a communal whirlpool bath. By the late 20th century jetted bathtubs had become popular for home installation.

It is possible to produce baths with bubbles simultaneously in and on top of the water (as in a poured beer), but the combination has not been popular. Mechanical aeration of a foam bath may produce much more foam than is sought—the Internet is replete with first hand accounts and sometimes photographs of such experiences—and many mechanically aerated baths are hot tubs which are shared and not drained between uses and so are desired to be kept free of non-maintenance materials. Mechanically aerated baths for tissue debridement of burn victims typically have added anti-foaming agents to counteract the film-forming properties that some medicinal additives have as a side effect, but the anti-foam is sometimes omitted or reduced for children to give them more of a pleasant distraction during debridement. Bath fizzies that also foam tend to produce disappointingly little foam when allowed to do so from their own fizz, and aeration of the water loses the gas from the fizz.

When the term "bubble bath" is encountered on the Internet referring to a gas-infused bath or pool, it is more often by a non-native user of English who may not be aware of its use to refer to foam baths (see above). In other languages the distinction is more likely to be kept by use of different words; for example in Dutch schuimbad refers to a bubble bath and bubbelbad refers to a jacuzzi which can produce bubbles on its own.

== See also ==
- Bathing
- Bath salts
