= Gurjaani =

Gurjaani გურჯაანი
- Town

- Location of Gurjaani Gurjaani (Kakheti)
- Coordinates: 41°44′40″N 45°48′00″E
- Country: Georgia
- Region: Kakheti
- Municipality: Gurjaani
- Town: 1934
- Elevation: 415 m (1,362 ft)

Population (January 1, 2024)
  - Total: 7,261
- Time zone: UTC+4 (Georgian Time)
- Website: gurjaani.ge

Gurjaani (Georgian: გურჯაანი) is a town in Kakheti, a region in eastern Georgia, and the seat of the Gurjaani Municipality. It is located in the Alazani River Plain, at an elevation of 415 m above sea level.

Gurjaani was first recorded as a village in a historical document of the early 16th century. It acquired the status of a town in Soviet Georgia in 1934. As of the 2014 census, Gurjaani had a population of 8,024. The town is the center of the largest wine-making region of Georgia.

== Background ==
Gurjaani is situated in the fertile Alazani Plain, at 415 m above sea level, and 110 km east of Georgia's capital of Tbilisi. It is the center of an important region of viticulture and wine-making. Important landmarks of the town are Akhtala, a historic spa, locally known for its mud bathes, and the early medieval Gurjaani Kvelatsminda Church, the only example of a two-domed design in Georgia. There are also several museums, the largest of which is the Gurjaani Museum of Local Lore and History.

== History ==
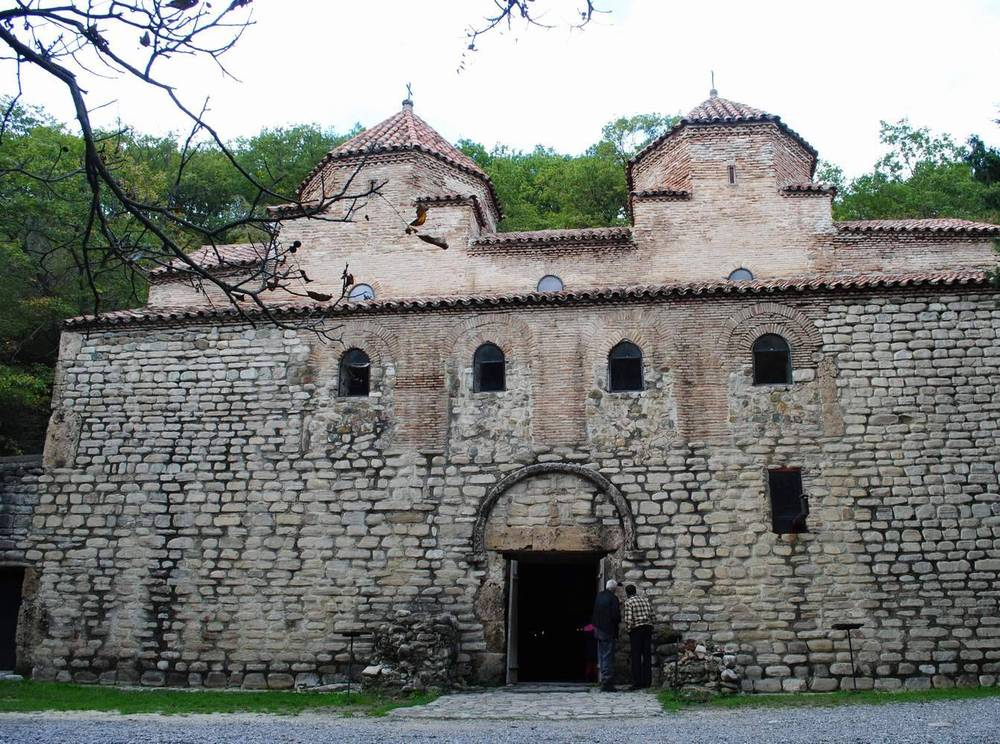
Kvelatsminda church of Gurjaani.

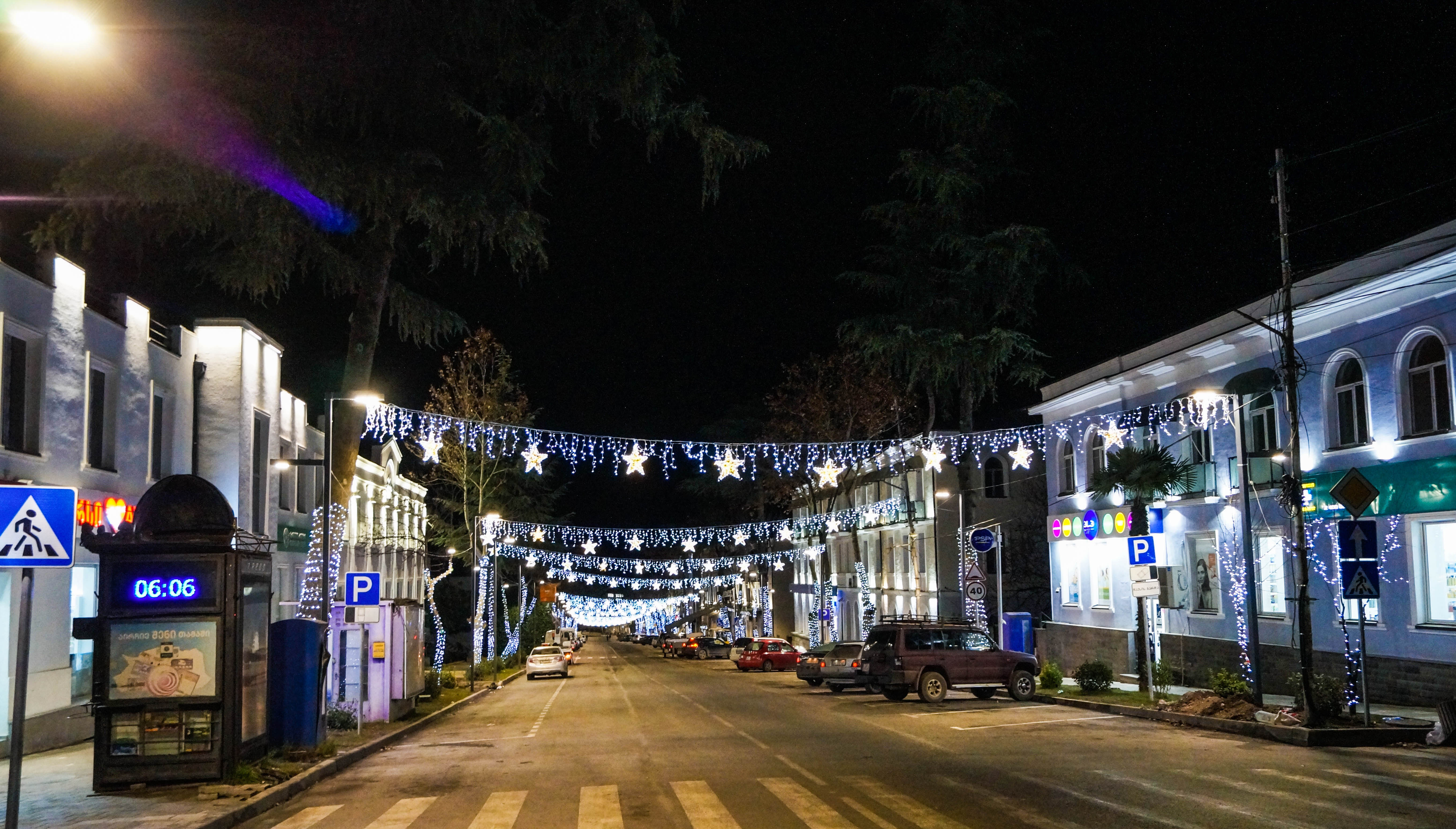
Central part of the town

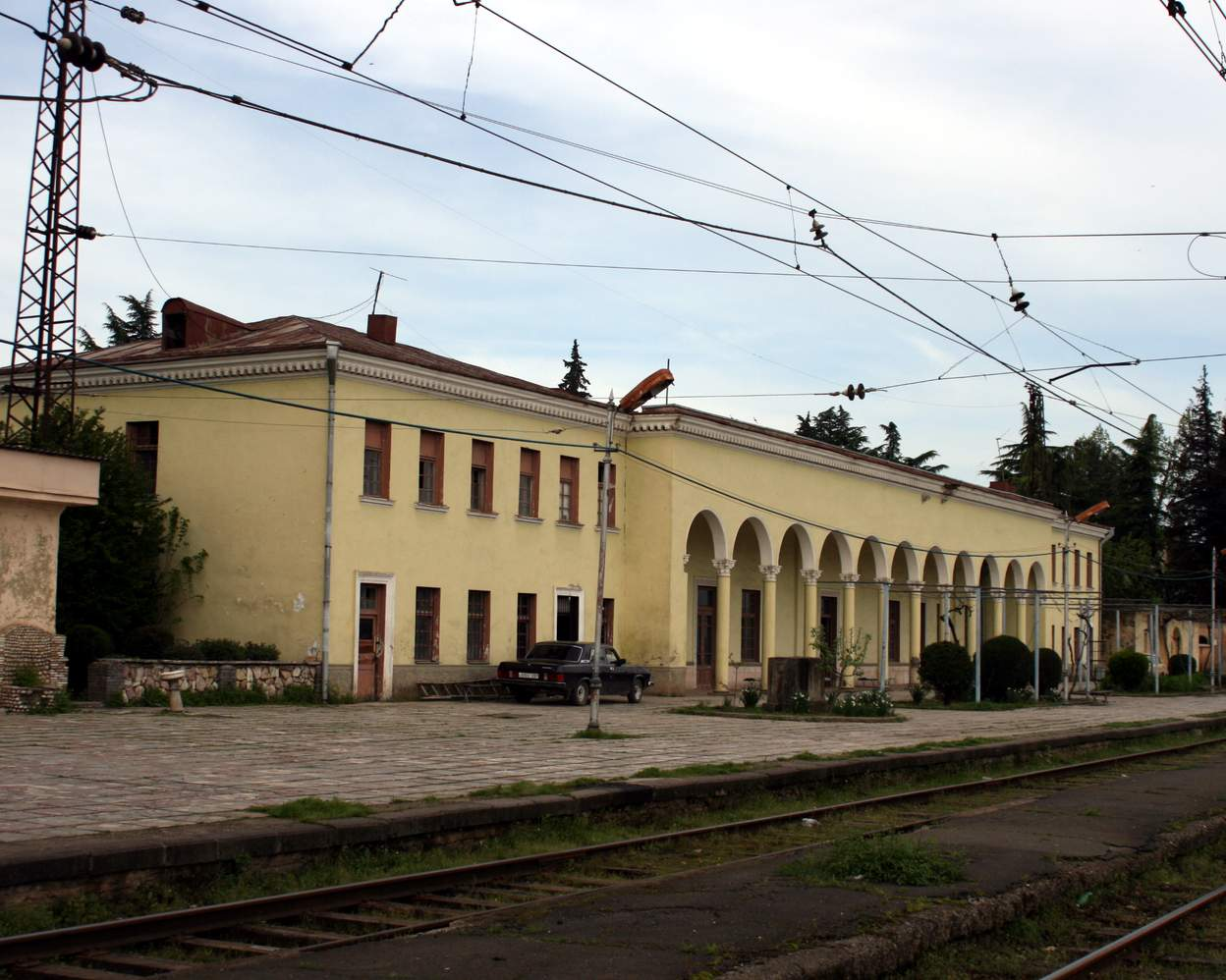
Gurjaani railway station

The territory of Gurjaani has not been systematically studied archaeologically. Occasional and incidental finds, such as burials, pottery, and Byzantine coins, suggest it was a home to an established settlement in the early Middle Ages. Gurjaani was first documented as a village in a charter issued in the name of King Alexander I of Kakheti (r. 1476–1511), granting the locale an exemption from taxation. In historical documents, Gurjaani is frequently mentioned together with the toponym of Kakhtubani, which is now one of the town's neighborhoods and home to the Kvelatsminda Church. Gurjaani was in possession of the Andronikashvili noble family. As a result of a series of marauding inroads from the mountains of neighboring Dagestan, Gurjaani had been virtually depopulated by the 1770s.

Gurjaani rose to a larger settlement when a railway line was constructed in Kakheti in 1915. It became a center of the newly created homonymous district—a predecessor of the present-day municipality—in 1930 and became a town in 1934. During Soviet-era industrialization, Gurjaani had wine-making, canning, distilling, brick-making, and mechanical repair plants.

The post-Soviet political and economic crisis took its toll on Gurjaani in the 1990s. The population dwindled, industry declined, and violent crime was on the rise. An armed group with ties to the Mkhedrioni paramilitary organization was implicated in several high-profile murders. The Mkhedrioni itself was in de facto control of the Gurjaani district from 1992 to 1995. Despite political and relative economic stability achieved in the 2000s, Gurjaani still lacks some elements of proper urban infrastructure and services.

== Sports ==
=== Football Clubs ===
The football club of the town is Alazani Gurjaani, that play in Regionuli Liga. The club's biggest achievement was made in the 1992–93 season, when it took the third place in the Umaglesi Liga. During that period the team was led by Otar Gabelia. In 2014–15, Alazani finished second in Group East of the third league, one point short of the group leader. In 2020, the club participated in Regionuli Liga tournament.

=== Stadium ===
David Kipiani Stadium, named in honour of David Kipiani, is the stadium of Alazani Gurjaani.

== Population ==
As of the 2014 national census, Gurjaani had a population of 8,024, with an ethnic Georgian majority.

Population	1989 census	2002 census	2014 census	2023 census
Total	12,594	10,029	8,024	7,426

=== People from Gurjaani ===
- Bela Chekurishvili - poet
- Maka Purtseladze - Woman Grandmaster

== Twin towns – sister cities ==
Gurjaani is twinned with:

- (Spain) Laguardia, Álava, Basque Autonomous Community
- Haradok, Belarus
- Pakruojis, Lithuania
- Piaseczno County, Poland
