= Mud bath =

Therapeutic treatment of soaking in warm mud

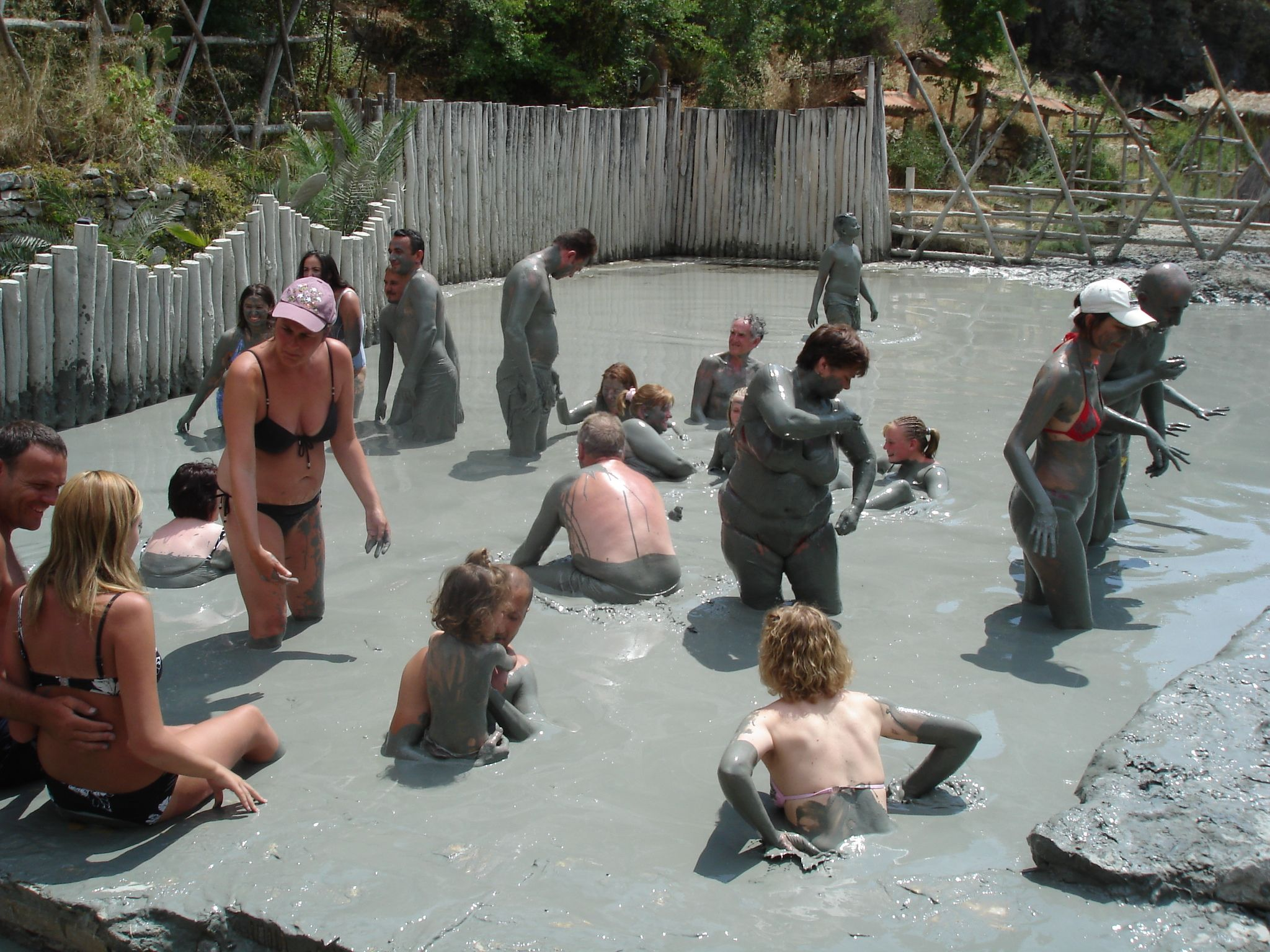
Mud bath in Turkey

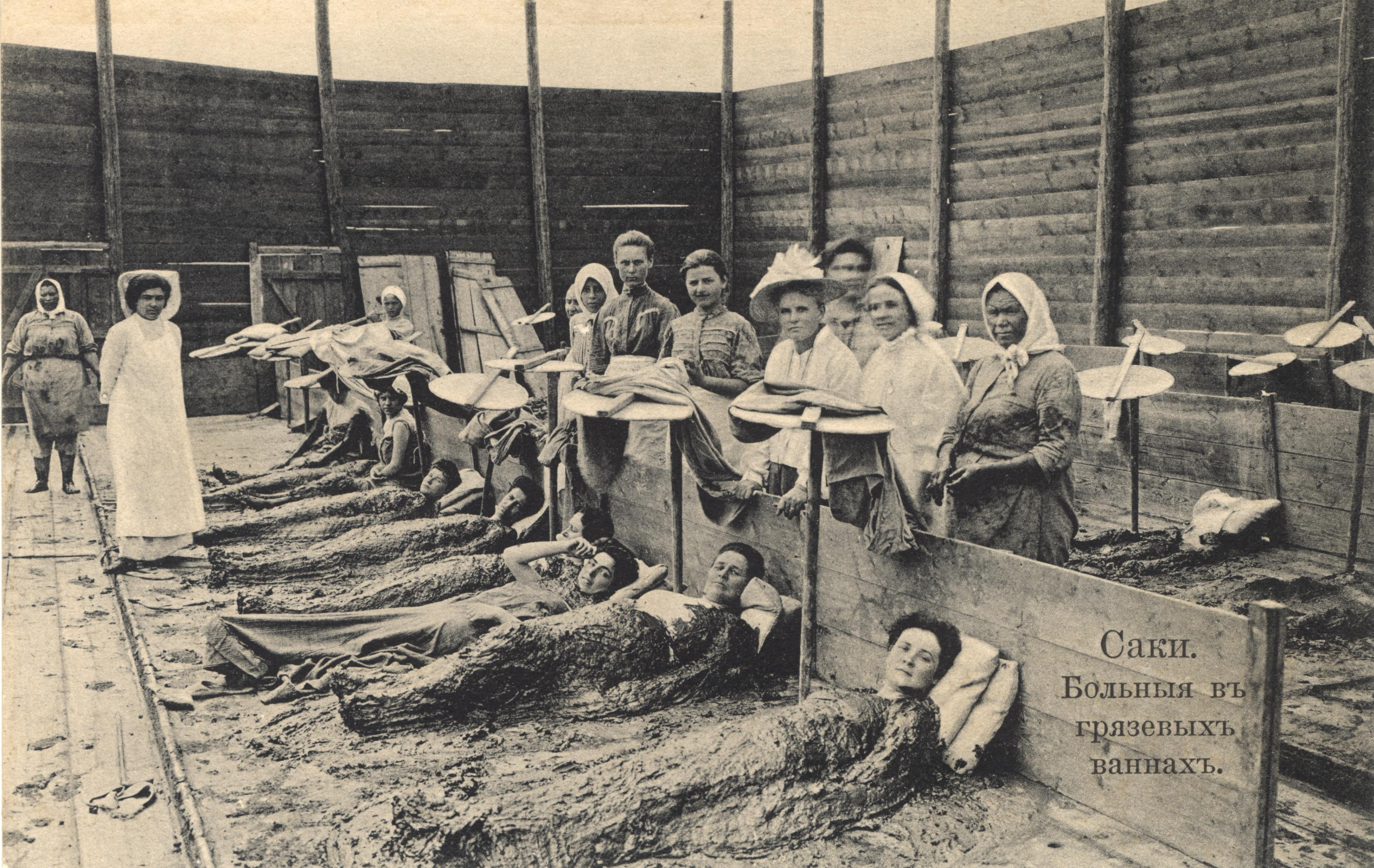
Mud baths at Yevpatoria circa 1920

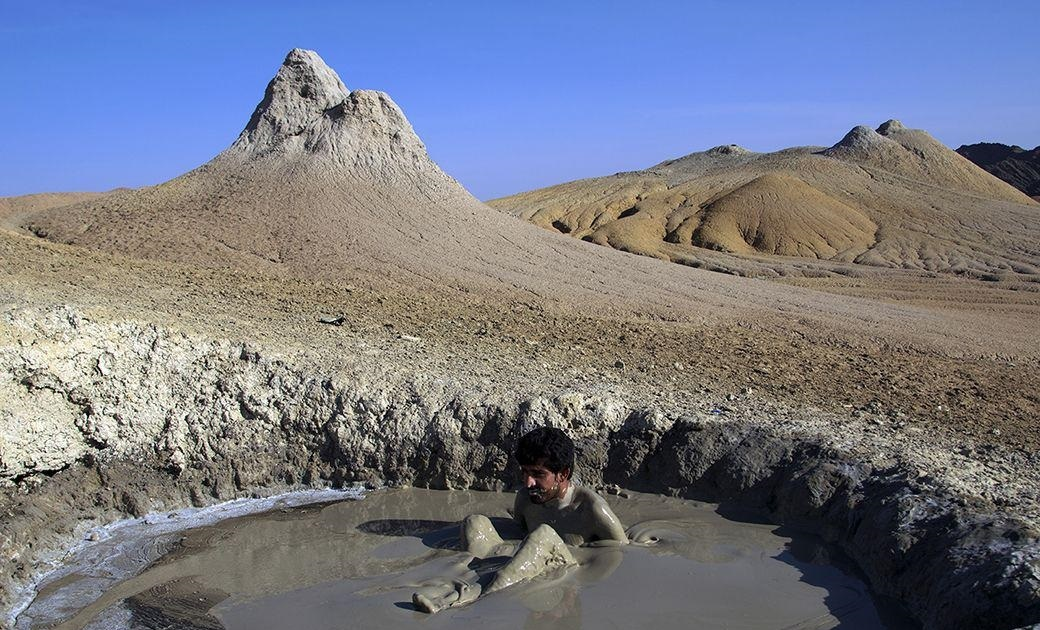
Person bathing in Pirgel Mud Volcano, Balochistan

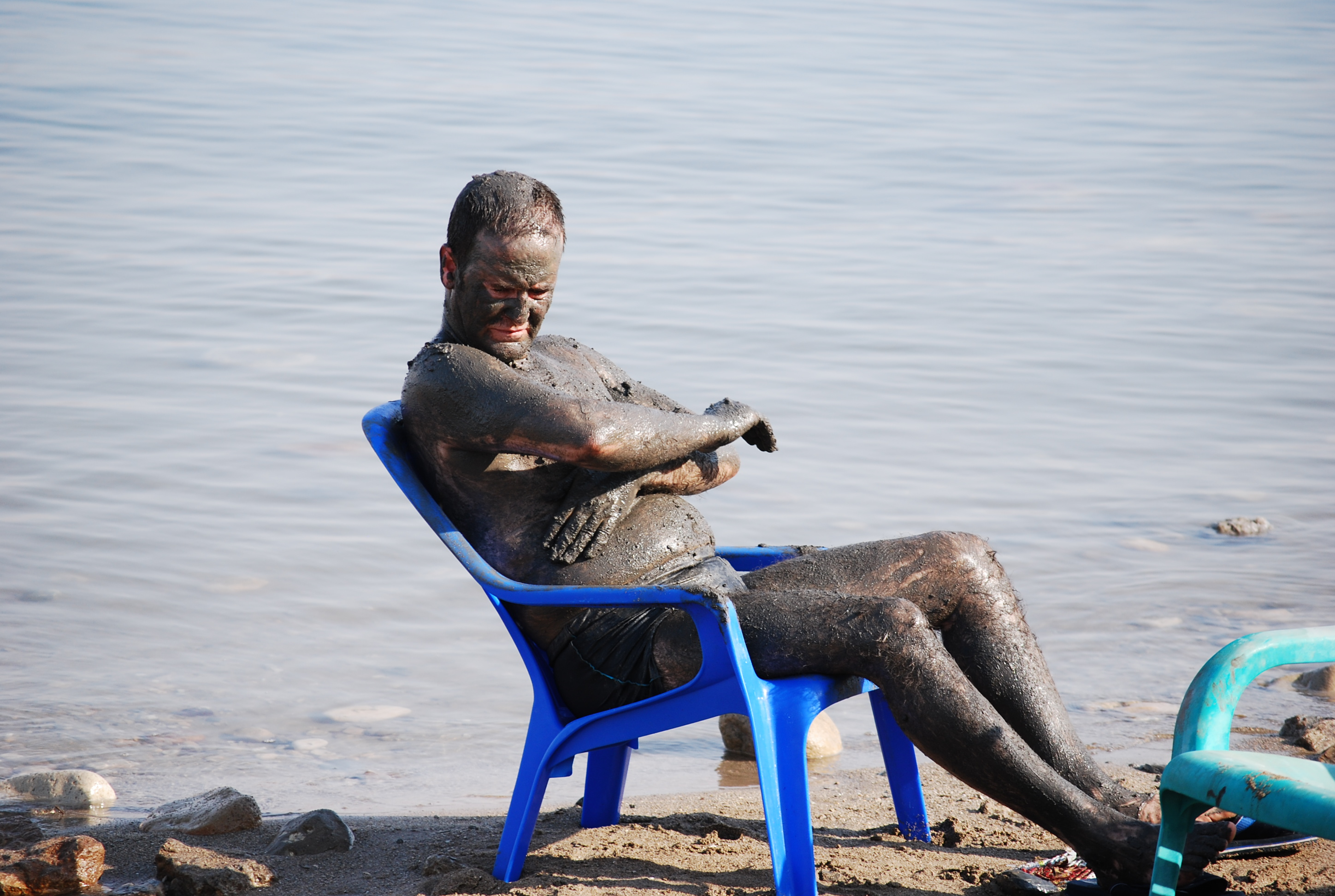
Man mud bathing at the Dead Sea

A mud bath is a therapeutic treatment that involves soaking in a bath of warm mud, often in a natural hot spring or geothermal pool, inland sea or at a spa. Mud baths have been used for centuries as a way to promote health and relaxation, and are still popular today in many parts of the world. Mud baths can be found at spa resorts and hot springs, both natural and developed, globally.

== Description ==
The mud used in mud baths is usually a combination of natural mineral-rich clay and water, which is heated to a comfortable temperature. The mud is then applied to the body, and the person is left to soak in the mud for a period of time, typically around 15-20 minutes.

The benefits of mud baths are allegedly numerous. The heat of the mud helps to increase blood flow and stimulate the immune system, while the minerals in the mud are believed to have a range of healing properties. Mud baths are also said to help detoxify the body, ease muscle pain and tension, and promote healthy skin.

A 2021 systematic review of studies which investigated the effect of mud baths on osteoarthritis concluded that mud bath therapy "cannot substitute for conventional therapy" but can be used in addition to it as "treatment with mud-bath therapy may relieve pain, stiffness and improve functional status in patients".

In addition to the physical benefits, mud baths are also believed to have a relaxing and rejuvenating effect on the mind. Many people find that the warm, soothing sensation of the mud helps to reduce stress and promote a sense of well-being.

Mud baths come from many sources:

- Lakes (e.g., Lake Techirghiol in Romania and Käina Bay in Estonia)
- Saltwater sea (e.g., Dead Sea in Jordan
- Hot springs (e.g., Calistoga, California; Ojo Caliente, New Mexico)
- Mud volcano (e.g., Tiga Island, Malaysia, El Totumo, Colombia, Gurjaani, Georgia

== See also ==
- Balneotherapy
- Bath salts
- Heubad
- Mud wrap
- Mud pot
- Peloid
- Wallowing
