= Giorgi Maisuradze (footballer, born 1991) =

Georgian footballer

Personal information
- Full name: Giorgi Romanovich Maisuradze
- Date of birth: 9 December 1991 (age 34)
- Height: 1.72 m (5 ft 7 1/2 in)
- Position: Midfielder

Senior career*
Years	Team	Apps	(Gls)
2009–2010	FC Sioni Bolnisi	13	(0)
2011–2012	FC Lokomotivi Tbilisi	9	(2)
2012	FC Norchi Dinamo Tbilisi	1	(0)
2014–2015	FC Sochi	14	(0)
- * Club domestic league appearances and goals as of 04:17, 27 June 2015 (UTC)

Giorgi Romanovich Maysuradze (Georgian: გიორგი მაისურაძე; born 9 December 1991) is a Georgian football player. He also holds Russian citizenship.

He made his professional debut in the Russian Professional Football League for FC Sochi on 26 August 2014 in a game against FC TSK Simferopol.
