= Vachnadziani Monastery =

Georgian Orthodox monastery in Gurjaani, Georgia

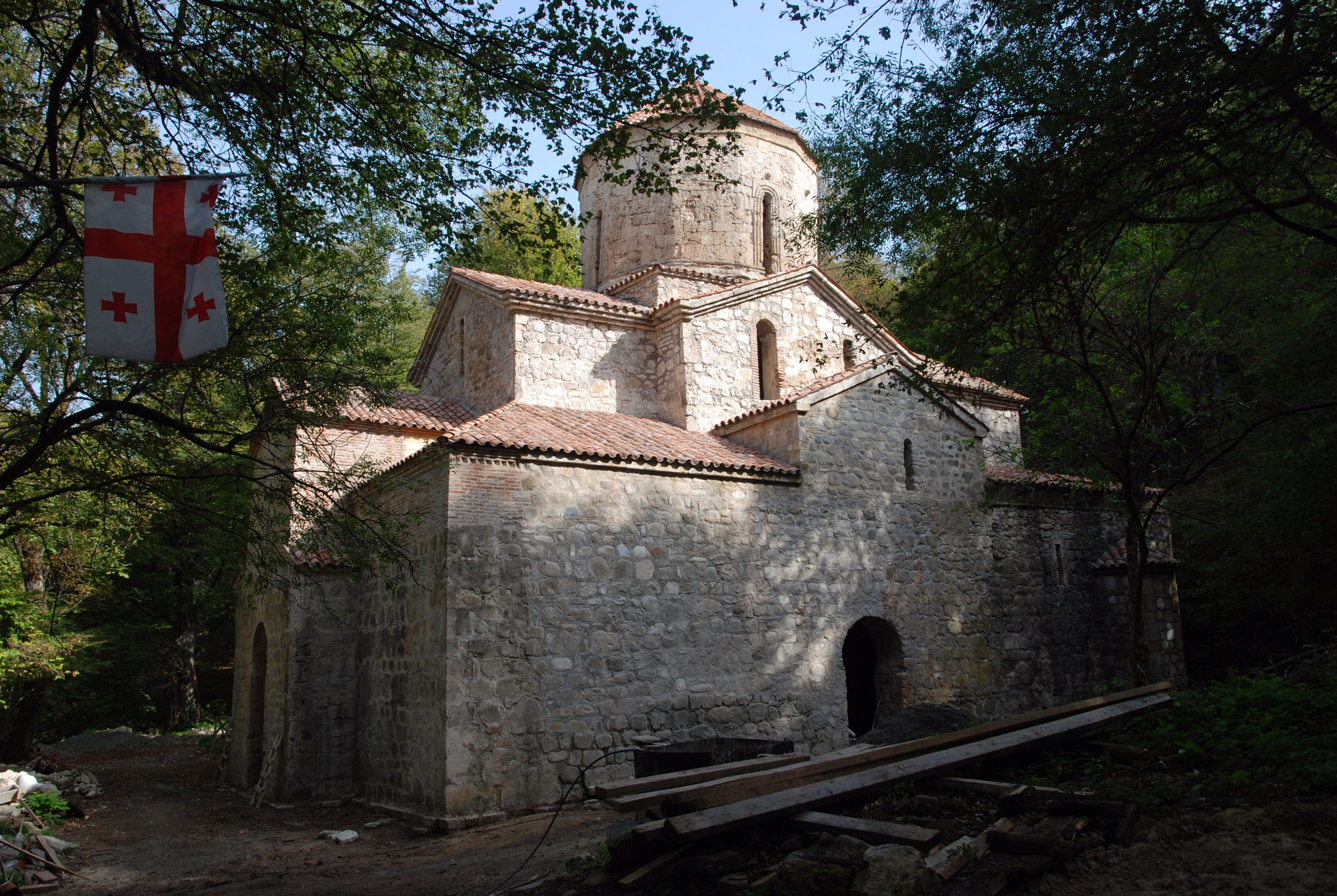
- Vachnadziani Monastery, SW

- Location within Kakheti Location within Georgia

Religion
- Affiliation: Georgian Orthodox Church

Location
- Location: (Georgia (country)) Gurjaani Municipality, Georgia
- Interactive map of Vachnadziani Monastery
- Coordinates: 41°48′37″N 45°36′32″E

Architecture
- Type: Monastery, church, castle
- Style: Georgian

The Vachnadziani All Holy (Georgian: ვაჩნაძიანის ყველაწმინდა, Watschnadsianis Qwelazminda), or Vachnadziani Monastery is an old monastery Georgian Orthodox near the Vachnadziani village (called in the Soviet era Schroma) in the Gurjaani Municipality, eastern of Georgia. The main church of the named after All Saints (Georgian Qwelazminda) monastery was the Mother Church of the 9th century.

== Design ==
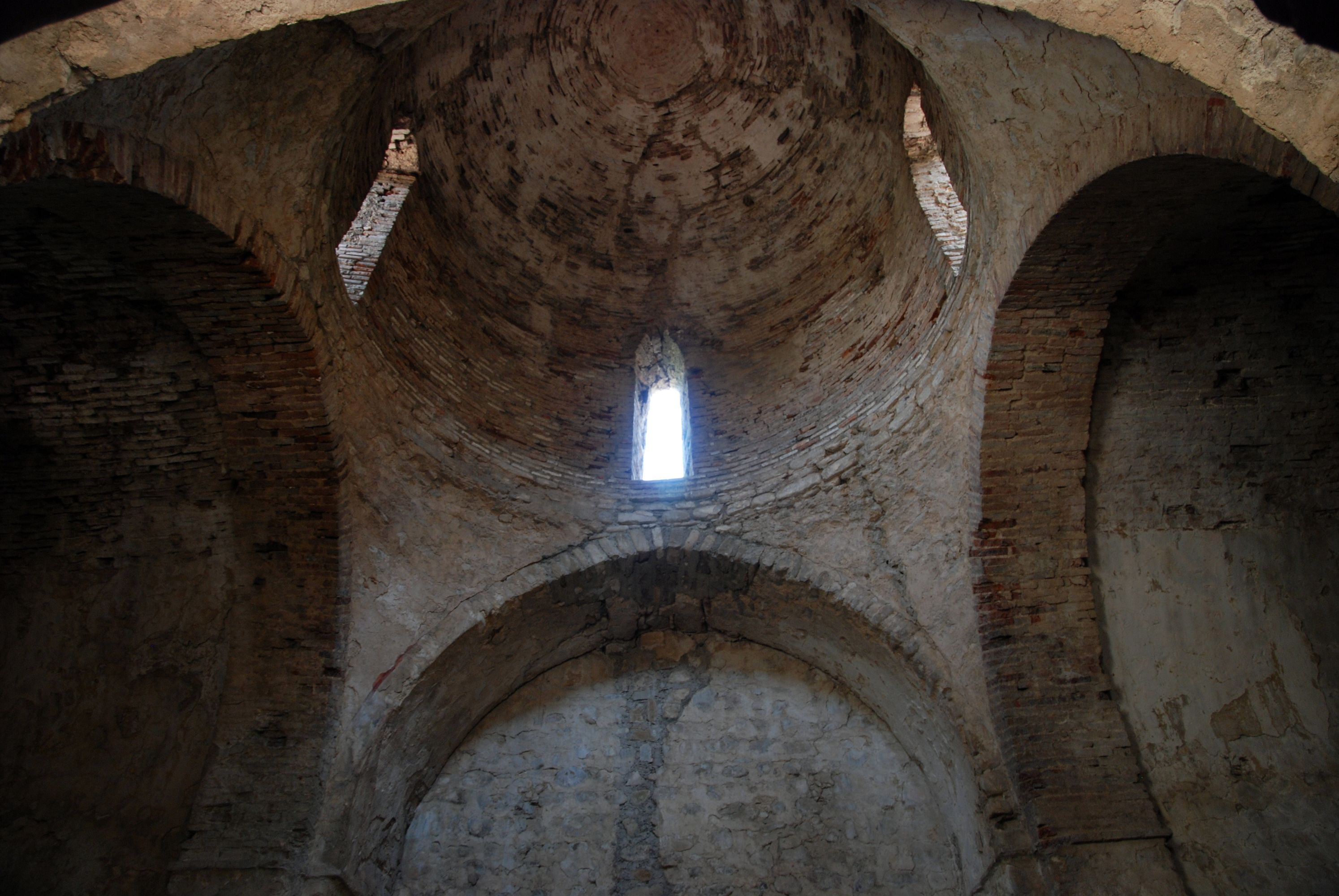

Its complex, "baroque" architecture unites a three-church basilica and a central building, which is surmounted by a high dome. The architecturally significant building introduced the pendentive dome in Georgia and is considered a major starting point for the emergence of classical Georgian church architecture from the 11th century.

== History ==
In the 6th to 7th centuries, the monastery had a basilica with three naves, whose western part was damaged by a landslide. Fragments of the building can be seen today. Later, at the end of the 8th century - the beginning of the 9th century, the dome of the church of Kvelazminda (All Saints) was built. The church is built of stone and brick. Kvelazminda refers to the transition period of Georgian architecture (VIII - X) and is one of the most significant and highly artistic monuments.

The monastery had a high fence with a door on the west side. The building of architectural importance introduced the pendentive dome in Georgia and is considered as an essential starting point for the emergence of the architecture of the classic Georgian church of the eleventh century.

== Other buildings ==
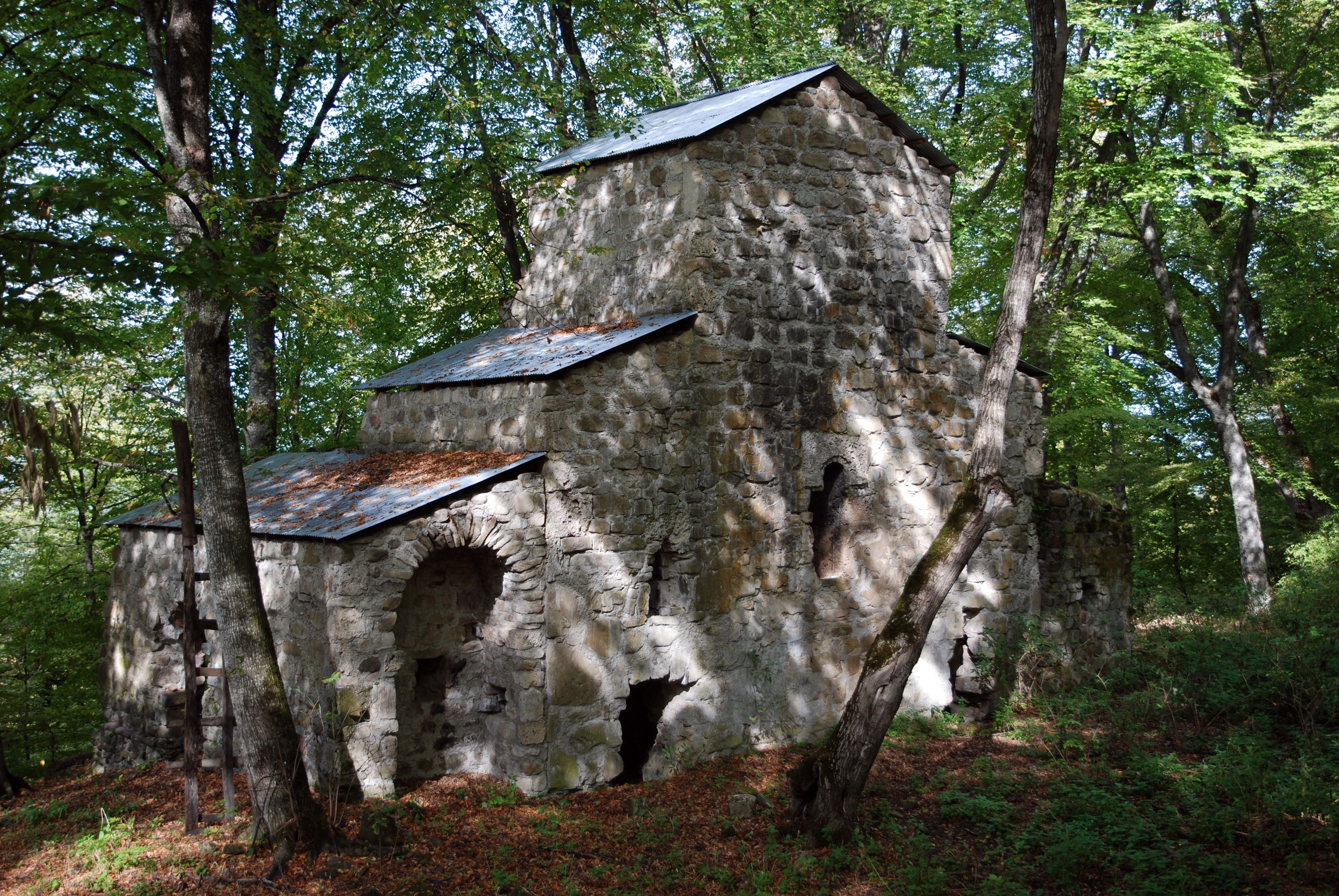

About 50 meters west are the ruins of a lower three-nave basilica, dated in the 6th-7th century. The east wall and a few meters of the restored flanks are preserved for stabilization. The central horseshoe-shaped apse had a large arched window; two narrow window openings barely allowed light to enter the side rooms, which were not connected to the apse through the doors.

Facing the southern facade of the Church of the Mother of God, there are some layers of carved bricks from a monks' unit and the monastery school. According to tradition, it is said that the poet Tschachruchadze (Chakhrukhadze) received training there in the 19th century. He is credited with Tamariani hagiography, a collection in honor of Queen Tamar.

Nearby, there were also the ruins of a large two-story palace from the 10th century. The original roof consisted of a flat wooden roof.

== Literature ==
- Chubinashvili, G. N., Arquitectura de Kakheti, TB., 1959
- Ernst Badstübner: Die Kirche Kwela Zminda in Gurdschani und die Muttergotteskirche des Klosters Kwela Zminda in Watschnadsiani. In: Derselbe: Baugestalt und Bildfunktion. Texte zur Architektur- und Kunstgeschichte. Lukas, Berlin 2006, S. 41–57
- Wachtang Beridse, Edith Neubauer: Die Baukunst des Mittelalters in Georgien von 4. bis zum 18. Jahrhundert. Anton Schroll, Wien/München 1981, S. 82f
- Russudan Mepisaschwili, Wachtang Zinzadse: Die Kunst des alten Georgien. Edition Leipzig, Leipzig 1977, S. 99–101
- Edith Neubauer: Altgeorgische Baukunst. Felsenstädte Kirchen Höhlenklöster. Anton Schroll, Wien/München 1976, S. 85–89
