= Gurjaani Kvelatsminda Church =

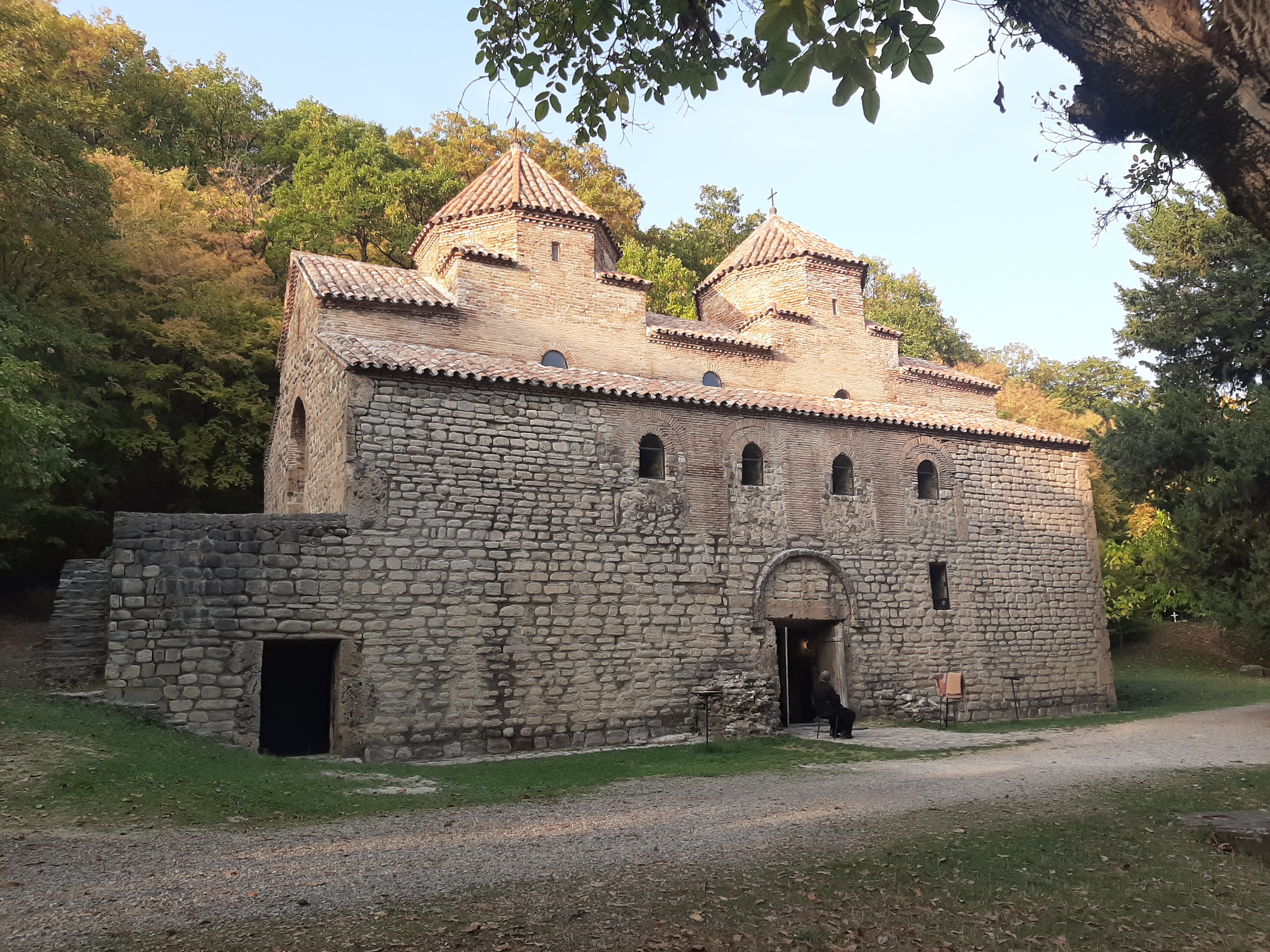
- Church seen in 2019

- Location within Georgia

Religion
- Affiliation: Georgian Orthodox Church
- Leadership: See also: Tsinandali

Location
- Location: Gurjaani, Kakheti, Georgia
- Coordinates: 41.720489°N 45.787799°E

Architecture
- Type: Church
- Completed: 8th/9th century
- Dome: 2
- Immovable Cultural Monument of National Significance of Georgia
- Official name: Gurjaani Kvelatsminda
- Designated: November 7, 2006; 19 years ago
- Reference no.: 1032
- Item Number in Cultural Heritage Portal: 7017
- Date of entry in the registry: October 3, 2007; 18 years ago

The Gurjaani Kvelatsminda Church of the Dormition of the Mother of God (Georgian: გურჯაანის ყველაწმინდა, literally, "Gurjaani's All Saints") is a Georgian Orthodox church constructed in the 8th or 9th century, during the "transitional period" in the medieval Georgian architecture. It is located in the town of Gurjaani in Georgia's easternmost region of Kakheti.

The Gurjaani church is the only extant example of a two-dome church design in the territory of Georgia. It is mostly built of straight courses of cobblestone; corners and decorations are made of squares of pumice stone and arches, vaults, and pillars consist of brick. The church is a complex design, some portions of it organized as two-storey structures. Naves are separated by two pairs of pillars. A high, span-roofed middle nave ends in a horseshoe apse and is divided into three square portions. Each of the outermost squares are topped by low octahedral domes, crowned with vaults. In the 17th century, Persian invasions and Dagestani inroads into the area resulted in abandonment of church services which would not resume until 1822. In 1845, however, the clergy of Gurjaani moved to the Khirsa monastery and the Kvelatsminda Church was once again abandoned. In 1938, the Georgian authorities cleaned the area of the church and restored it as a historical monument. Further conservation works were conducted in 2010.
