= Heubad =

Heubad (German pronunciation: [ˈhɔʏbat]) is an Austrian traditional hay bath with more than 200 years of history. Bathers immerse themselves in hay which is warm from fermentation.

== Information ==
Heubad was ostensibly discovered by a tired field worker who, after resting in the hay after several hours of manual labor, felt refreshed and rejuvenated. Heubad is commonly and most popularly done in the Hotel Heubad Spa in Völs am Schlern, Italy. There, people taking part in heubad burrow in the moist fermented hay for about twenty minutes, followed by lying down on a couch and relaxing for another thirty minutes. This process is considered to open up pores, detoxify the body, soothe aches and pains, and to stimulate the metabolism. The hay is heated to the temperature of 104 degrees Fahrenheit before the people lie in it. The hay used for the heubad treatment is cut during July and August in the Dolomite mountains, about 2,000 meters above sea level.

== See also ==
- Bathing
