= Bath bomb =

Effervescent bath enhancer

A bath bomb dissolves, revealing a rainbow

A bath bomb or bath fizzie is a toiletry item used in the bath. It was invented and patented in 1989 by Mo Constantine, co-founder of Lush Cosmetics. It is a compacted mixture of wet and dry ingredients molded into any of several shapes and then dried. Bath water effervesces at the surface of a bath bomb immersed within it, with attendant dispersion of such ingredients as essential oil, moisturizer, fragrance, or colorant.

== History ==
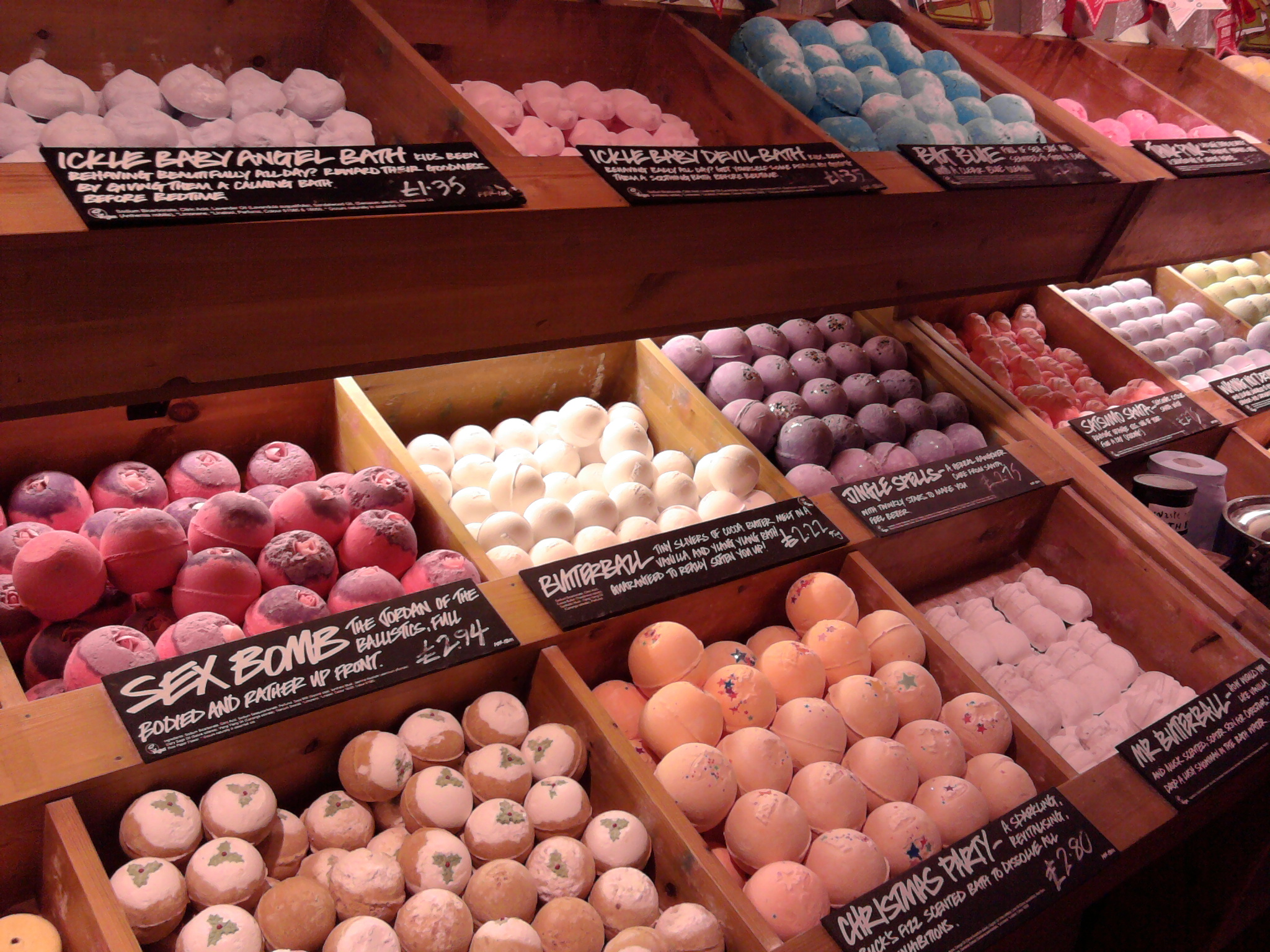
Bath bombs on display in a Lush Cosmetics shop

The bath bomb was invented in 1989 by Lush Cosmetics co-founder Mo Constantine. Working from her shed in Dorset, Constantine was inspired to create her 'Aqua Sizzlers' (which would later become 'Bath Bombs') after becoming intrigued by Alka-Seltzer tablets. While her first attempts looked much like Alka-Seltzer tablets, Mo and her husband Mark Constantine quickly began experimenting with a range of molds and ingredients.

“We were up and down the high street, buying different shaped jelly moulds, anything. In the garden centre, Mark was saying ‘What are you looking at, why have you got that pond mould upside down?’, and I’m just looking at its contours thinking I can probably press something in that!” – Mo Constantine

The original bath bomb was patented by the Constantines in 1989 under the brand name 'Cosmetics To Go'. However, when the company went into administration, the couple lost the patent. In 2014, a new patent was issued to Cosmetic Warriors LTD (the proprietor of the Lush Cosmetics trademark), protecting the process of creating a bath bomb with distinct layers.

Videos and pictures of multilayered bath bombs shared on social media are often referred to as bath art.

In recent years, the bath bomb has led to other trends. Bathscaping refers to the decoration of a bathtub, both before and during bathing.

== Composition ==
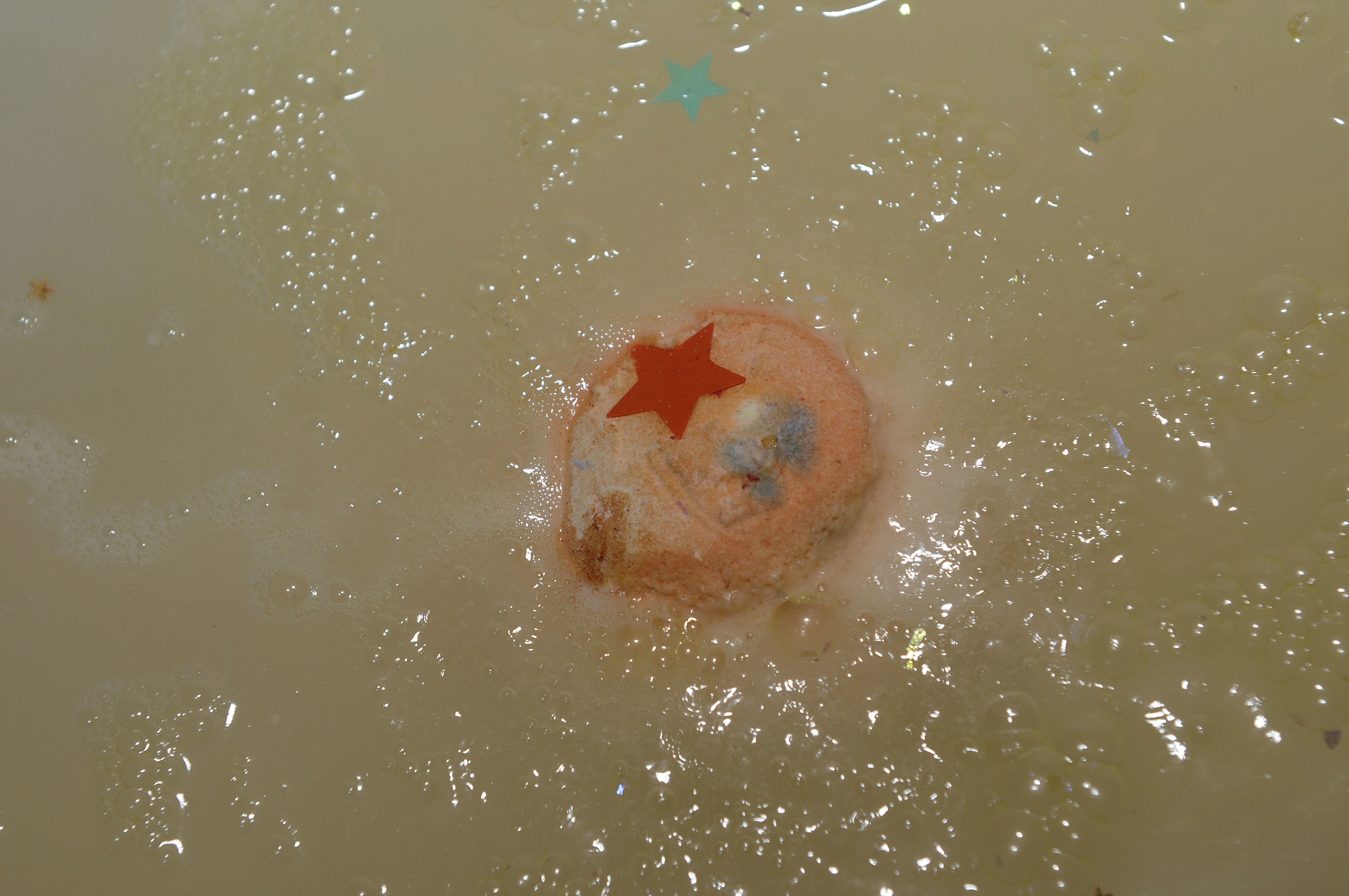
A bath bomb causing bathwater to fizzle

Bath bombs' primary ingredients are a weak acid and a bicarbonate base. These are unreactive when dry, but react vigorously when dissolved in water to produce their characteristic fizzing over a period of several minutes. This is an acid–base reaction that involves conversion of citric acid and sodium bicarbonate to monosodium citrate and carbon dioxide:

C_{5}H_{7}O_{5}CO_{2}H _{(aq.)} + NaHCO_{3 (aq.)} → C_{5}H_{7}O_{5}CO_{2}^{−}Na^{+}_{(aq.)} + H_{2}O_{(l)} + CO_{2 (g)}

The other ingredients in bath bombs can vary considerably. However, most have scented ingredients as well as dye to impart a pleasant fragrance and color to bathwater. Lathering agents, such as sodium lauryl sulfate, are also often added to create bubble foams.

== Production ==
Bath bombs are generally spherical but can be found in a variety of shapes, such as tablets or lumps. Shops offer a wide range of bombs, but they can also be made at home. Some companies use bath bomb machines to increase their bath bomb production rates. These machines can make up to hundreds of bath bombs per hour.

== Potential health concerns ==
Although bath bombs are well tolerated by many people, some additives such as fragrances and dyes can cause irritation. Common skin irritants and allergens found in bath bombs include limonene, linalool and sodium lauryl sulfate. The main ingredients—citric acid and sodium bicarbonate—are generally not considered as skin irritants when used as bath enhancers because of significant dilution in water.
