= Non-governmental organizations in Georgia (country) =

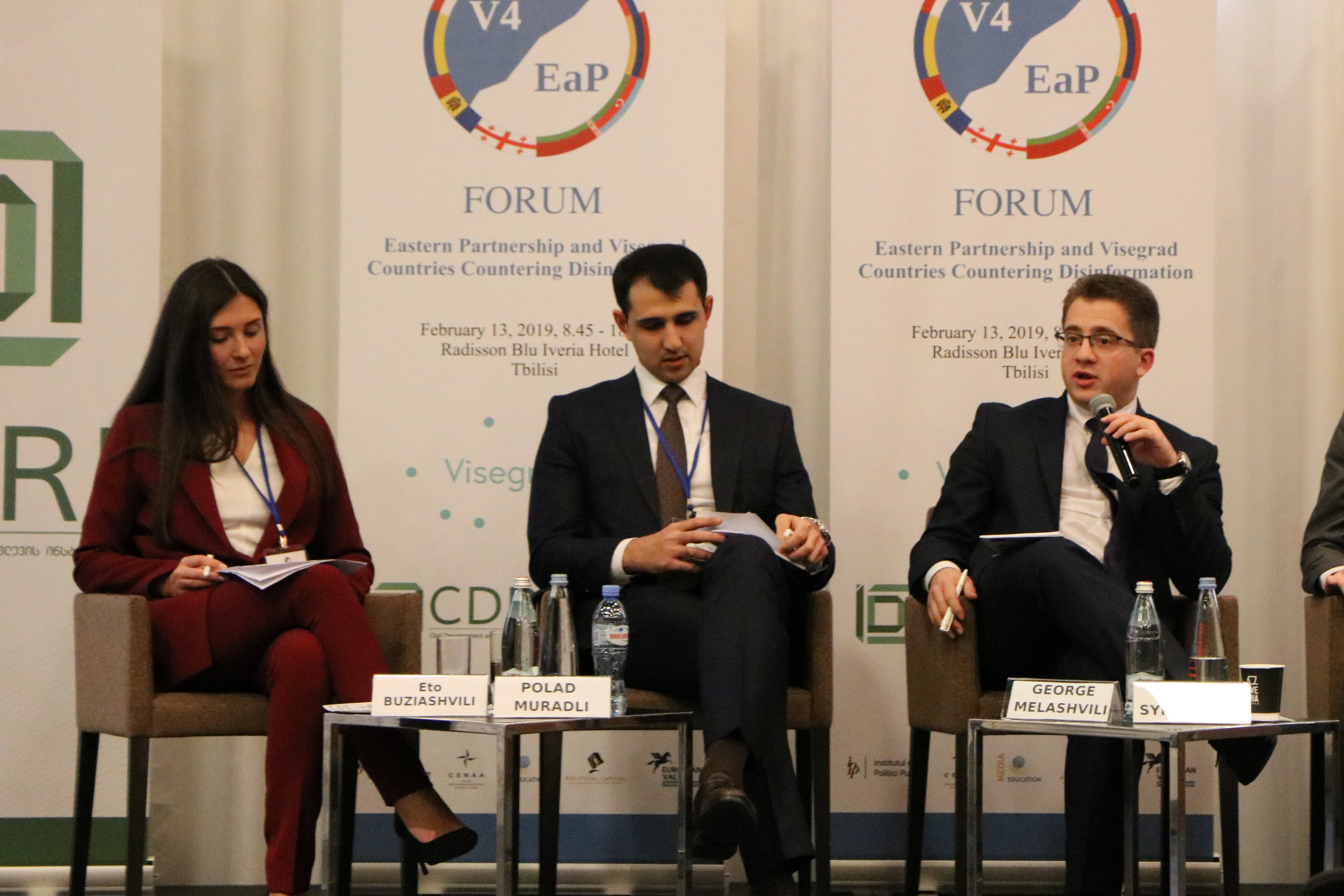
The last session of EaP&V4 Countries Countering Disinformation forum hosted by the Europe-Georgia Institute titled Disinformation and the Youth Resilience: Forging a New Generation of Leaders. from left to right: Eto Buziashvili, International Security Expert, (Georgia); Polad Muradli, Baku-based Independent Expert (Azerbaijan); George Melashvili, President of the Europe-Georgia Institute (Georgia).

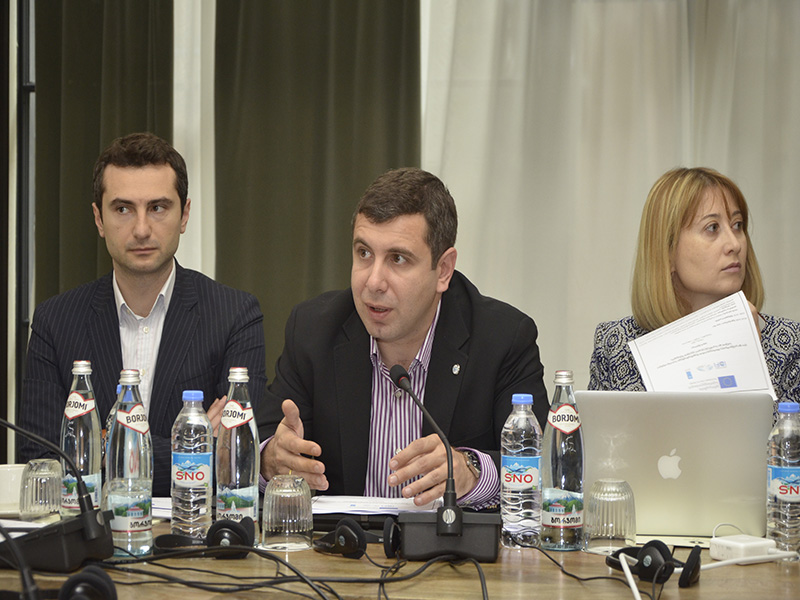
Georgia's 2017–2018 Parliamentary Openness Action Plan created by the Institute for Development of Freedom of Information.

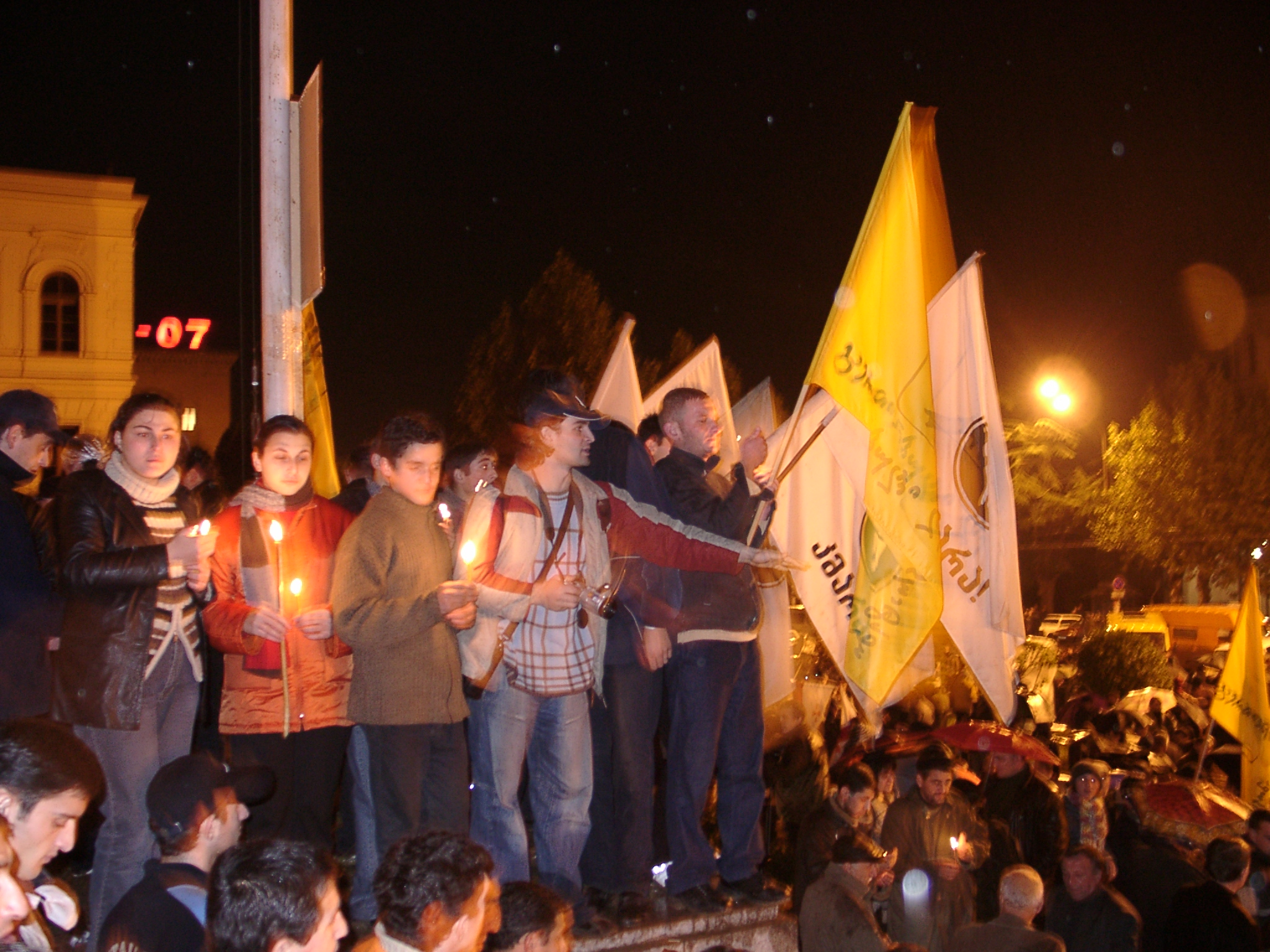
Young Georgians holding the Kmara flags during the Rose Revolution in November 2003

Non-governmental organizations in Georgia, nongovernmental organizations, or nongovernment organizations in Georgia, commonly referred to as NGOs in Georgia, are usually non-profit and sometimes international organizations independent of governments and international governmental organizations (though often funded by governments) that are active in humanitarian, educational, health care, public policy, social, human rights, environmental, and other areas to effect changes according to their objectives and operate in Georgia.

== List of NGOs in Georgia ==
Name	Formation	Description	Official Website
Society for the Spreading of Literacy among Georgians	1879	The Society for the Spreading of Literacy among Georgians was the first non-governmental organization in Georgia founded by Ilia Chavchavadze. The Society was a charity founded by a group of leading Georgian intellectuals in May 1879 in order to promote a cultural renaissance among the peasantry of Georgia, then part of the Russian Empire. It survived into the early Soviet period and operated until 1926/7.	
Liberty Institute	1996	Liberty Institute is a Georgian research and advocacy organization affiliated with Ilia Chavchavadze State University. Liberty Institute played an important role in the Rose Revolution. After the revolution, most of its founders were elected to the Parliament of Georgia.	
New Economic School – Georgia	2001	The New Economic School – Georgia (NESG) (in Georgian: ახალი ეკონომიკური სკოლა საქართველო) is a free market think-tank, non-profit organization, NGO based in Tbilisi, Georgia. Its main mission is education of young people in free market ideas. It organizes seminars, workshops and conferences for education and exchanges of ideas.	
Institute for Development of Freedom of Information	2009	Institute for Development of Freedom of Information (IDFI) – is a Georgian non-governmental organization which tends to support the development of an informed and empowered society for democratic governance. IDFI promotes human rights and good governance by raising civic awareness through sound informational reports, research and recommendations; Advocates for initiating & implementing reforms of policies, laws and practices to enhance democratic governance.	
Europe-Georgia Institute	June 1, 2015	Europe-Georgia Institute (EGI) – is a hybrid non-governmental organization in Georgia. The Europe-Georgia Institute was founded by George Melashvili, Shalva Chkheidze and Revaz Topuria in 2015. The EGI states its goal is to inspire, empower, and connect people to change their world. The EGI is an independent civil society organization and focuses its campaigning on issues such as human rights, peacebuilding, promotion of good governance and support the involvement of youth in democratic process. The EGI emphasizes "independence and impartiality", and explicitly precludes political, economic, or religious factors in its decision making. EGI's principles and operational guidelines are highlighted in its Charter.	
Caritas Georgia	November 4, 1994	Caritas Georgia – is a non-governmental organization in Georgia. Caritas Georgia states that it is actively working in the fields of emergency response, humanitarian, social, health, and development. Caritas Georgia has been serving the indigent population of Georgia since its establishment. It has been working on creating such a Georgian society that protects each individual's dignity and fundamental rights. Peace, justice, mercy, and solidarity are established, and public interests prevail over individual interests. Based on the preceding, Caritas Georgia aims to promote human development and social justice, bring relief to vulnerable and disadvantaged people, and encourage self-responsibility and dignity.	

== See also ==
- 2023–2024 Georgian protests
- Foreign funding of non-governmental organizations
