= Vaziani (Kvemo Kartli) =

Vaziani ვაზიანი
- Village
- Etymology: Georgian: vaziani ("place of vines")
- Location within Georgia Location within Kvemo Kartli
- Coordinates: 41°41′23″N 45°02′59″E
- Country: Georgia
- Mkhare: Kvemo Kartli
- Municipality: Gardabani
- Community: Martkopi
- Elevation: 583 m (1,913 ft)

Population (2014)
  - Total: 3,686
- Demonym: Vazianian
- Time zone: UTC+4 (Georgian Time)
- Postal code: 1310

Vaziani (Georgian: ვაზიანი) is a village in southeastern Georgia, located within the Gardabani Municipality of the Kvemo Kartli region. Nestled on the Samgori Plain immediately east of Tbilisi, the village has a complex spatial structure shaped by the presence of major military infrastructure, including the Vaziani Military Base, Vaziani Airfield, and an expansive military training ground that physically divides the settlement into two civilian sections. The larger northern area is informally known as Zemo Vaziani.

The name "Vaziani" derives from the Georgian word for grapevine (vazi) and conveys the meaning "a place with vineyards," though local folklore also links the name to King Heraclius II and the aftermath of an 18th-century battle. Vaziani has been inhabited since at least the Russian Imperial period and experienced notable demographic and structural shifts under Soviet rule, when the area became a key site for military housing and operations. Following Georgian independence, the village remained economically modest but strategically important due to its proximity to key roadways and defense infrastructure.

Today, Vaziani is part of the Community of Martkopi and is represented in the Gardabani Sakrebulo through the 10th Local District. It lies along the S5 Kakheti Highway and marks the starting point of the Sh38 road leading across the Gombori Mountains to Telavi. While it lacks a local church or municipal government, the village hosts two public schools and remains the subject of ongoing development efforts related to water access, infrastructure, and the possible expansion of the airfield into a commercial airport.

== Etymology ==
The name Vaziani (Georgian: ვაზიანი) is derived from the Georgian word vazi (ვაზი), meaning "grapevine," combined with the possessive suffix -iani (იანი), which is commonly used in Georgian toponyms to indicate association or abundance. Thus, Vaziani can be interpreted to mean "place of vines" or "area rich in vineyards," reflecting the region's historic association with viticulture and grape cultivation.

This etymology is consistent with the village's location on the fertile Samgori Plain, an area well-suited to agriculture and historically known for vine-growing. The structure of the name follows a common Georgian linguistic pattern and bears similarity to other place names such as Vazisubani ("vine-covered slope" or "vineyard settlement"), which refers to multiple villages across Georgia as well as a residential district in the capital, Tbilisi.

The name Vaziani itself is not unique to this village. At least two other settlements in Georgia bear the same name, located in different regions of the country, a reflection on the cultural and agricultural importance of grape cultivation throughout Georgia, one of the world's oldest wine-producing regions.

In popular folklore, however, alternative explanations have been proposed. One such folk etymology links the name to an episode involving King Heraclius II of Kartl-Kakheti (r. 1744–1798), who is said to have fought a bloody battle in the area. According to this version, the name arose from his lament: "Va, ziani momvida!" ("Alas, I have suffered great damage!"), a phrase blending the Georgian expressions for grief (va) and harm (ziani). Another version recounts that King Heraclius II, passing through the area, proudly declared to his retinue, "Me ak mteri vazianeo" ("Here, I overcame the enemy"), suggesting a more triumphant and militaristic origin. These folk interpretations, while colorful, are not supported by linguistic evidence.

== History ==
Timeline of Vaziani
Historical affiliations

Kingdom of Kartl-Kakheti, until 1801
Russian Empire, 1801–1918
Transcaucasian DFR, 1918
Democratic Republic of Georgia, 1918–1921
USSR (G.SSR) 1921–1991
Georgia, 1991–present

The area around Vaziani has been inhabited since prehistoric times. Archaeological excavations have uncovered Eneolithic-period remains at the site, identifying it as part of the Tsopi-Ginchi cultural group – one of the earliest sedentary farming cultures in eastern Georgia. These finds place human activity in the region as far back as the 5th–4th millennium BCE. The modern village of Vaziani, situated on the Samgori Plain just east of Tbilisi, developed primarily in the 20th century. A local folk tradition connects the area to King Heraclius II and references a possible military episode in the 18th century, though no contemporary historical sources confirm this claim.

Under the Russian Empire, the area fell within the Tiflis Uyezd of the Tiflis Governorate and was characterized by a diverse population of Georgians, Azerbaijanis, and Armenians. In 1915, the Kakheti section of the Transcaucasian railway network was inaugurated, including with a freight station in Vaziani. During the brief existence of the Democratic Republic of Georgia (1918–1921), Vaziani remained a rural locality within the Tiflis Mazra, although no specific events from this period are recorded in the village itself.

Following the Soviet annexation in 1921, Vaziani was incorporated into the Soviet system of centralized agriculture and regional planning. The fertile plain was reorganized into collective farms (kolkhozes) specializing in grains and livestock. In the mid-20th century, a major military base was constructed adjacent to the village, significantly shaping its development. Soviet-era apartment blocks were built to accommodate base personnel and their families, and the village grew in population and strategic relevance.

After Georgia's independence in 1991, the Vaziani military base was briefly used by Russian forces before being transferred to full Georgian control in 2001. Since then, it has served as a key operational hub for the Georgian Defence Forces and hosted regular joint training exercises with NATO and US troops until a dramatic halt in bilateral military ties in 2024. Its presence continues to influence the economic and logistical role of the village.

The Kakheti Highway (S5), which runs directly through Vaziani, has further reinforced its strategic position. Originally built in the Soviet period and significantly upgraded in the 2020s, the highway connects Tbilisi with the eastern region of Kakheti and passes through the heart of the village.

In the early 2020s, the Georgian government and the Asian Development Bank (ADB) announced plans to build a major international airport on the site of the existing Vaziani airfield. Intended as a long-term replacement for Tbilisi International Airport, the project could transform the area into a national transportation hub, though construction has not yet begun as of 2025.

Despite these developments, Vaziani continues to face serious infrastructure challenges. In 2013, a section of a Soviet-era apartment building collapsed, displacing several families. More recently, the village has been affected by a chronic lack of piped drinking water, with incomplete municipal projects leaving residents reliant on purchased or trucked-in water.

== Geography ==
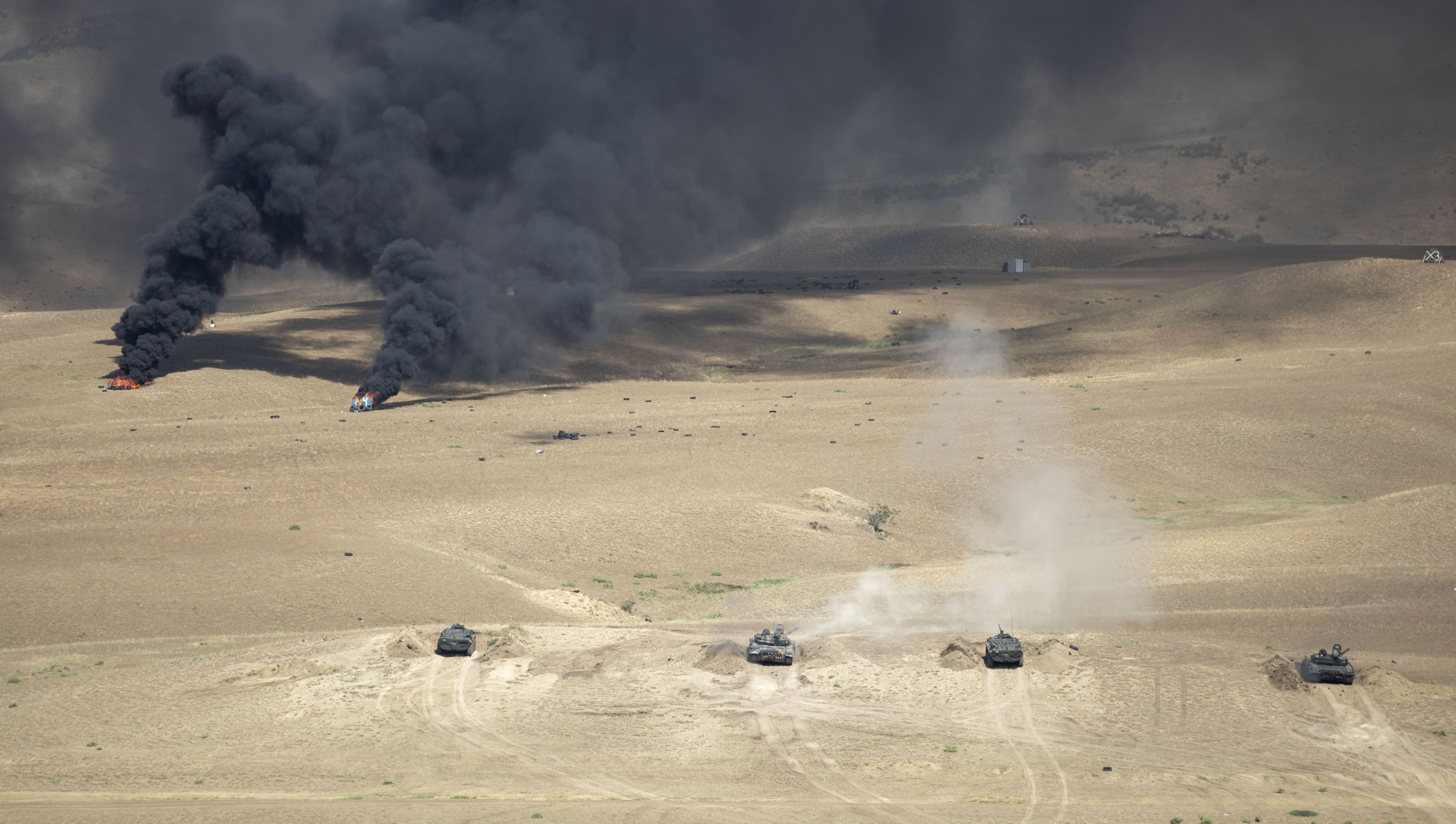
Vaziani military training ground, separating the northern and southern sections of the village

Vaziani is located in southeastern Georgia, within the Gardabani Municipality of the Kvemo Kartli region, approximately 25 kilometers east of Tbilisi. The village lies on the Samgori Plain, a broad, flat lowland area bordered by the Iori Plateau to the southeast and the Tbilisi basin to the northwest.

The elevation of the village is approximately 583 meters above sea level. The surrounding terrain is predominantly semi-arid steppe, with low vegetation, fertile agricultural soils, and limited forest cover. The plain is crisscrossed by seasonal streams and artificial irrigation channels, although natural water resources are scarce, contributing to ongoing water supply challenges in the village.

The Kakheti Highway (S5) passes directly through Vaziani, linking Tbilisi to the west with Sagarejo and the wider Kakheti region to the east. The village is situated between several distinct neighboring communities: Tbilisi borders it to the west, Mzianeti lies to the north, and Mukhrovani to the east. To the south, the landscape opens into rugged, sparsely inhabited terrain, characterized by broad plains and low hills.

The climate in Vaziani is continental semi-arid, characterized by hot, dry summers and cold winters. Annual precipitation is relatively low, averaging between 400 and 600 mm, with most rainfall occurring in spring and early summer. Due to its open topography and exposure, the area is also subject to occasional strong winds and dust storms.

The broader landscape is primarily agricultural, with nearby fields historically used for grain cultivation and livestock grazing, though much of this activity declined following the collapse of Soviet-era collective farms. In recent years, land use has been influenced by infrastructure development and military exercises, particularly in areas adjacent to the training zone.

== Demographics ==
As of the 2014 national census, Vaziani had a population of 3,686, reflecting a 37% increase from the 2,694 recorded in 2002. This growth stands out in contrast to broader rural depopulation trends observed across Georgia in the post-Soviet period.

The population of Vaziani is ethnically mixed, with the majority identifying as Georgians. There are also notable Azerbaijani and Armenian minorities, along with smaller numbers of other groups, including Russians and Assyrians, some of whom have historical ties to the former Soviet military presence in the area.

Religious affiliation generally follows ethnic lines, with most Georgians adhering to the Georgian Orthodox Church, while Azerbaijani residents are predominantly Shia Muslims. Armenian and other minority groups may follow their respective religious traditions, including Armenian Apostolic Christianity and Eastern Orthodoxy.

Vaziani's demographic growth over the past two decades is partly attributed to its proximity to Tbilisi, as well as to the presence of the military base, which has drawn both active personnel and support staff to the area. While much of rural Georgia has experienced emigration and population decline, Vaziani remains comparatively stable and demographically active.

Population of Vaziani
Year	Total population	Georgians	Azerbaijanis	Armenians	Others
2002	2,694	—	—	—	—
2014	3,686	89%	5%	2%	3%

== Description ==
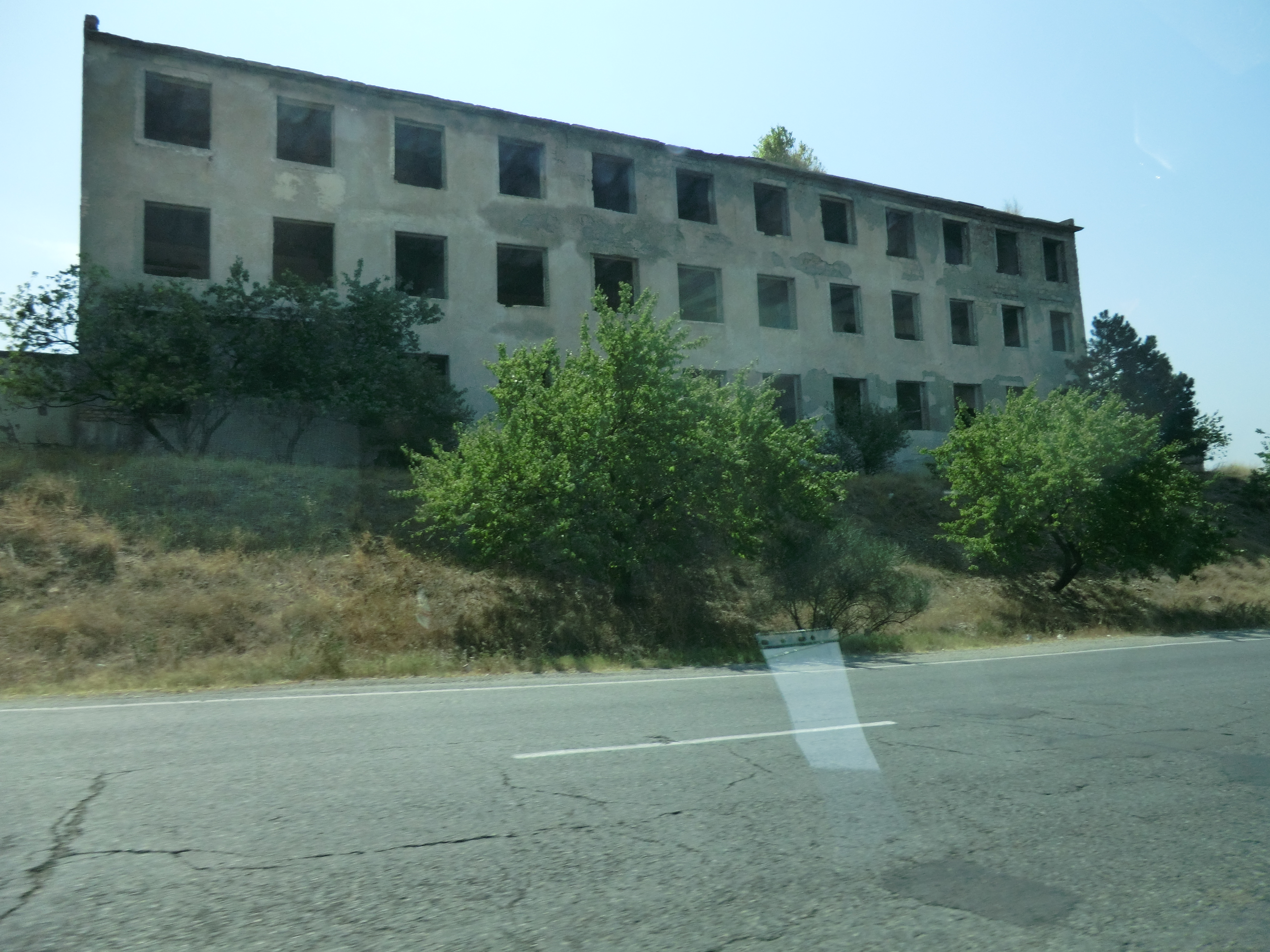
Abandoned housing complex in southern Vaziani

Vaziani is a village in southeastern Georgia, situated in the Gardabani Municipality of Kvemo Kartli, approximately 25 kilometers east of Tbilisi. Though officially designated as a rural settlement, the village holds strategic importance due to its close proximity to major transportation corridors and extensive military infrastructure.

The broader area known as Vaziani encompasses a variety of distinct zones that reflect its mixed civilian and military character. The northern section of the village, informally referred to as Zemo Vaziani ("Upper Vaziani"), is the largest and most densely inhabited area. It is bisected by the upgraded Kakheti Highway (S5), which provides a major transport link between Tbilisi and eastern Georgia. South of this highway, adjacent to the Vaziani military base, lies a more compact residential cluster locally known as the Adjarian Settlement—a name believed to originate from the resettlement of ecological refugees from Adjara in the late 20th century.

Further south, the Vaziani Military Base and its surrounding training ground dominate the landscape. This large restricted-access area not only serves military training purposes but also physically divides the two main civilian zones, resulting in limited local connectivity. Adjacent to the base is the Vaziani Airfield, a Soviet-era aviation facility currently under review for possible transformation into a future international airport.

The southernmost section of Vaziani, sometimes referred to as Lower Vaziani, is a densely built-up neighborhood in its own right. It features a concentration of mid-rise apartment blocks characteristic of the Soviet period, as well as public institutions such as Vaziani No.2 Public School, local businesses, and small-scale commerce. This area contributes significantly to the village's overall residential fabric and reinforces the fact that the settlement extends well beyond the traditionally emphasized zones near the highway and military installations.

The civilian built environment consists of Soviet-era apartment blocks—originally constructed for personnel stationed at the military base—and newer low-rise private homes. While essential civic infrastructure exists, local services remain underdeveloped, particularly in terms of water supply, road maintenance, and internal connectivity between settlement clusters.

== Public administration ==
=== Politics and governance ===
Vaziani is part of the Gardabani Municipality in the Kvemo Kartli region and is represented in the Gardabani Sakrebulo (Municipal Council) through the 10th Local District. Administratively, the village falls within the Community of Martkopi and is governed by the Gamgebeli of Martkopi, a local executive appointed by the Mayor of Gardabani Municipality. Vaziani does not have its own elected local leadership or distinct administrative unit.

Electorally, the village belongs to the 38th Precinct of Gardabani Municipality, which includes the civilian population of Vaziani. In recent years, residents have consistently supported the Georgian Dream party. However, opposition parties—most notably the United National Movement (UNM) and For Georgia—have maintained a significant presence.

Vaziani and its surrounding areas have been the subject of scrutiny in the past due to repeated allegations of electoral irregularities, particularly in military precincts. A notable example comes from the 2016 parliamentary elections, when the International Society for Fair Elections and Democracy (ISFED) reported procedural violations at Special Precinct No. 64, located on the Vaziani military base. Observers documented multiple cases in which voters were asked to sign beside the names of other individuals.

The following table presents recent election results from the civilian precinct in Vaziani:

Election results in Vaziani
Year	Election type	Party	Votes	Percentage
2024	Parliamentary	Georgian Dream	490	64.56%
2024	Parliamentary	For Georgia	53	6.98%
2021	Local (Municipal)	Georgian Dream	216	51.06%
2021	Local (Municipal)	United National Movement	164	38.77%
2020	Parliamentary	Georgian Dream	285	55.77%
2020	Parliamentary	United National Movement	121	23.67%

=== Public services and infrastructure ===
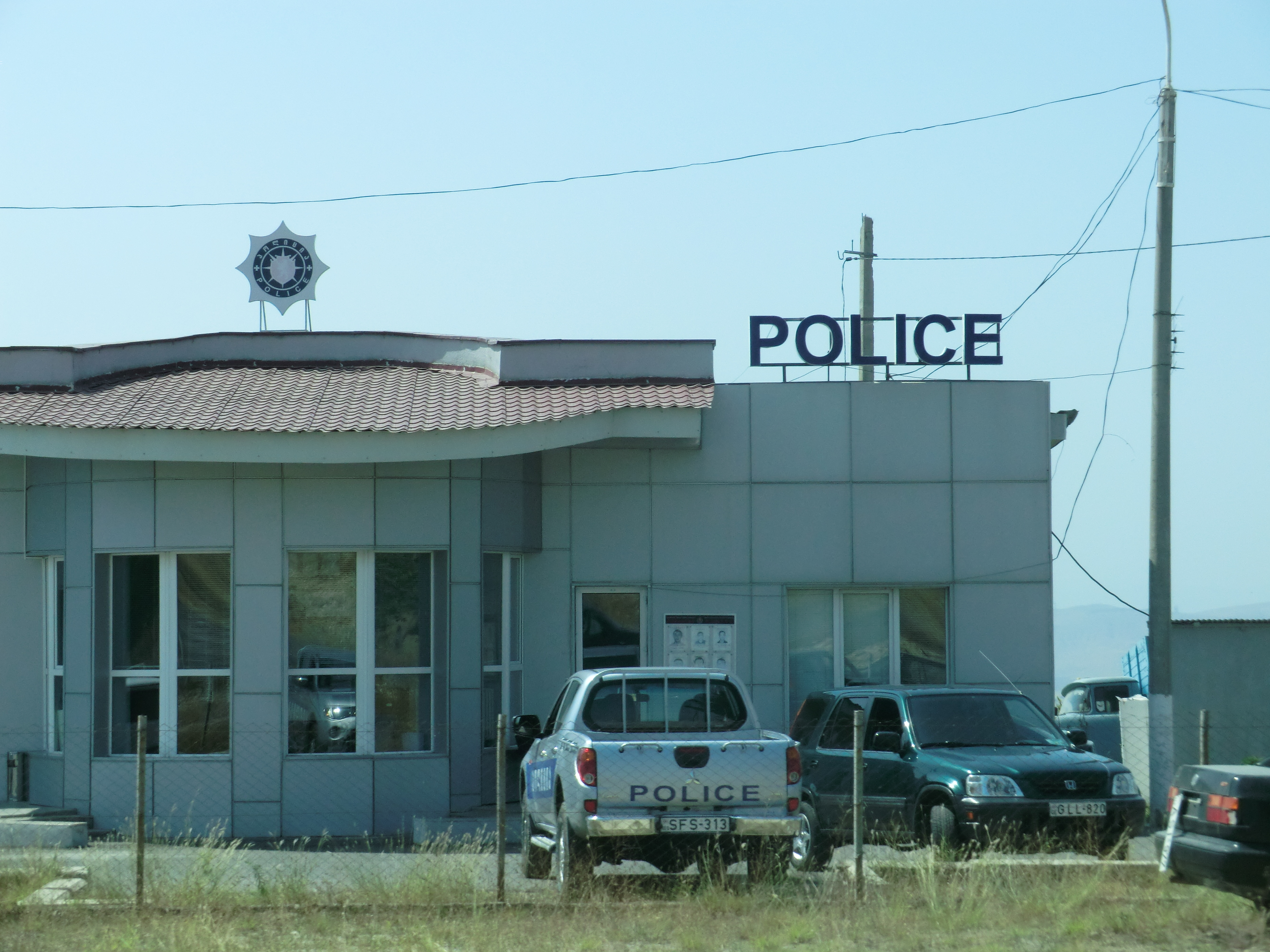
Police station in Vaziani

Vaziani faces persistent challenges in the provision of public services and basic infrastructure, despite its proximity to Tbilisi and its location on major transportation routes. One of the most acute issues is the lack of access to drinking water: most households in the village remain disconnected from a reliable piped supply. Residents frequently report receiving only non-potable water a few times per week, or none at all for extended periods, and many homes have never been connected to a functioning system. Although Vaziani was included in a World Bank–funded infrastructure initiative launched in 2019 to rehabilitate the water supply system across several Gardabani villages, progress has been uneven. While new meters and pipelines have been installed, residents have complained of incomplete work, damaged roads, and no real improvement in access.

The village lies along the S5 Kakheti Highway, a major east–west route connecting Tbilisi with eastern Georgia and Azerbaijan. A 4 km stretch of the highway through Vaziani was upgraded to a four-lane motorway and completed in 2022. Vaziani also marks the starting point of the Sh38 regional road, which crosses the Gombori Mountains and leads to the city of Telavi in Kakheti. In addition, the Sh160 road branches southward from Vaziani, providing a regional link to Sartichala and Gardabani. Despite these important national and regional connections, local internal roads within the village remain in poor condition. Many secondary streets are unpaved, riddled with potholes, or left unfinished due to repeated trenching for utility projects. Village residents frequently cite the deteriorated road network as a major obstacle in daily life.

Housing infrastructure in Vaziani, particularly in the section that formerly housed military personnel, also shows signs of severe degradation. In 2014, a partially collapsed residential building displaced approximately 20 families. Most households lack access to centralized gas or sewerage systems, relying instead on bottled gas, electric heating, and individual waste pits. Electricity and mobile services are generally stable, though occasional outages persist.

The village hosts two public schools—School No. 1 in the northern section and School No. 2 in the southern part—offering primary and secondary education under the state curriculum. The schools serve as focal points for local community life, with School No. 2 having been established in 2005. A small outpatient clinic provides limited healthcare services, while more specialized care typically requires travel to Gardabani or Tbilisi.

Although Vaziani has no formal train or city bus service, it is accessible by regional minibuses (marshrutkas) from Tbilisi, particularly from the Samgori and Ortachala terminals. These services connect the village to Tbilisi in under an hour. Intercity buses and Line 337 also operate in the area, and residents frequently use nearby towns like Gardabani or Rustavi as transport hubs.

== Economy ==
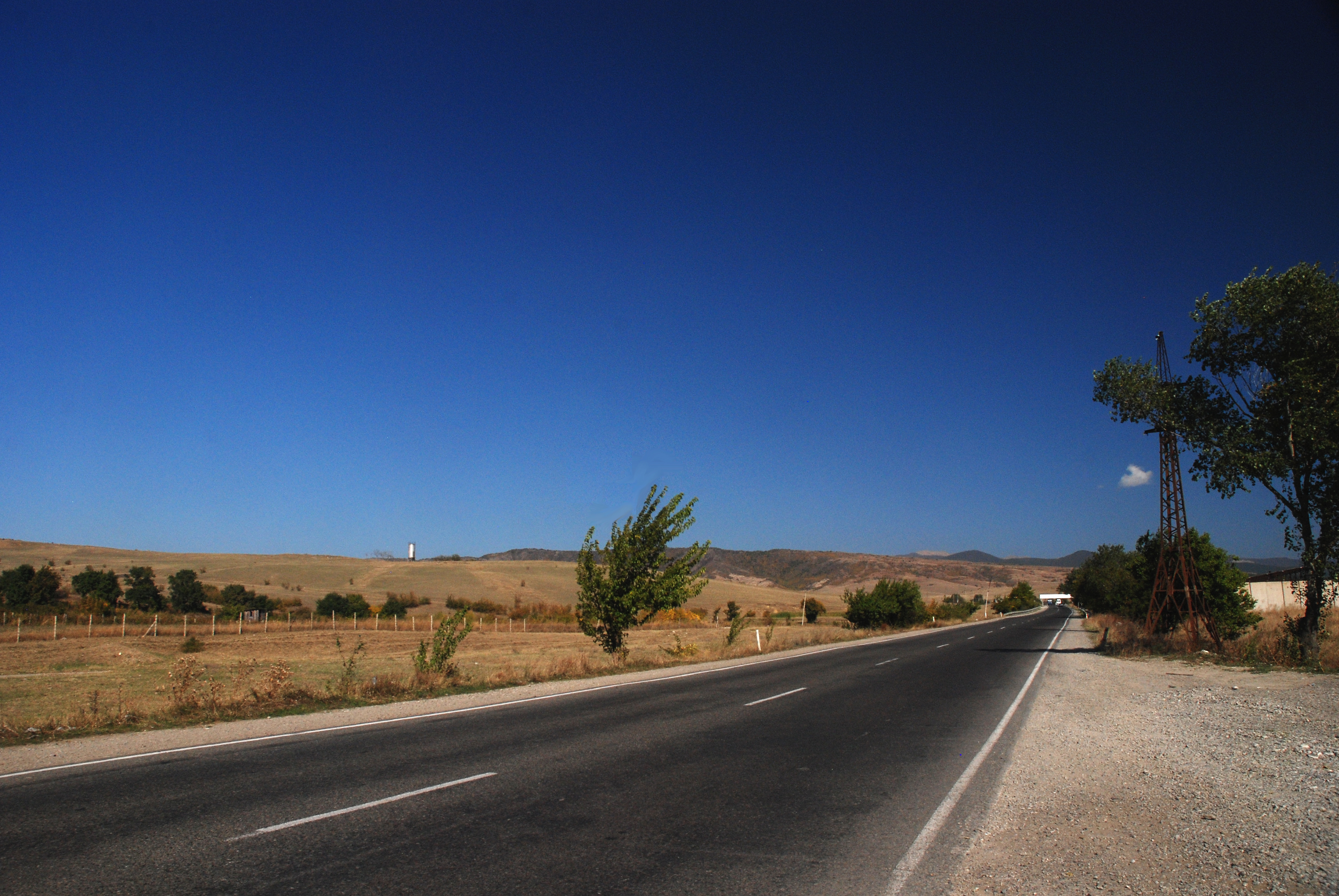
S5 Highway section near Vaziani

Vaziani's economy is modest and primarily driven by a combination of small-scale agriculture, military-related employment, and limited local services. While no large enterprises operate in the village, households rely on subsistence farming, cultivating vegetables, grains, and fruits for local consumption or sale in nearby markets. Residents typically manage small garden plots and raise livestock on a household scale. There are no formal agricultural cooperatives or processing facilities in the village.

A number of small businesses operate in Vaziani, including a grocery shop, a fuel station located on the main highway, and a few mechanical repair services for local vehicles. Retail activity remains limited, and most shopping is done in Gardabani or Tbilisi, to which the village is connected via frequent minibus (marshrutka) routes. Some residents are employed in transportation, including informal minibus driving between the village and the capital.

The nearby Vaziani Military Base represents the most significant institutional presence in the area. While military personnel stationed on base do not reside permanently in the village, the base contributes to the local economy by supporting infrastructure maintenance, logistical services, and occasional short-term demand for shops and transportation during military exercises. A small veterans’ center also serves retired servicemen residing in the village.

Though Vaziani lies adjacent to the Vaziani Airfield, plans to transform the site into a commercial airport have not yet materialized. If realized, the airport could significantly impact the local economy by generating employment and attracting private investment. However, as of 2025, there are no commercial aviation or airport-related businesses operating in the village.

In general, employment opportunities within Vaziani itself are limited. A significant portion of working-age residents commutes to Tbilisi, Rustavi, or Gardabani for work, while others rely on seasonal labor or state support. The village remains economically vulnerable, with development largely tied to the progress of broader infrastructure and investment projects.
