= Liberalism in Georgia (country) =

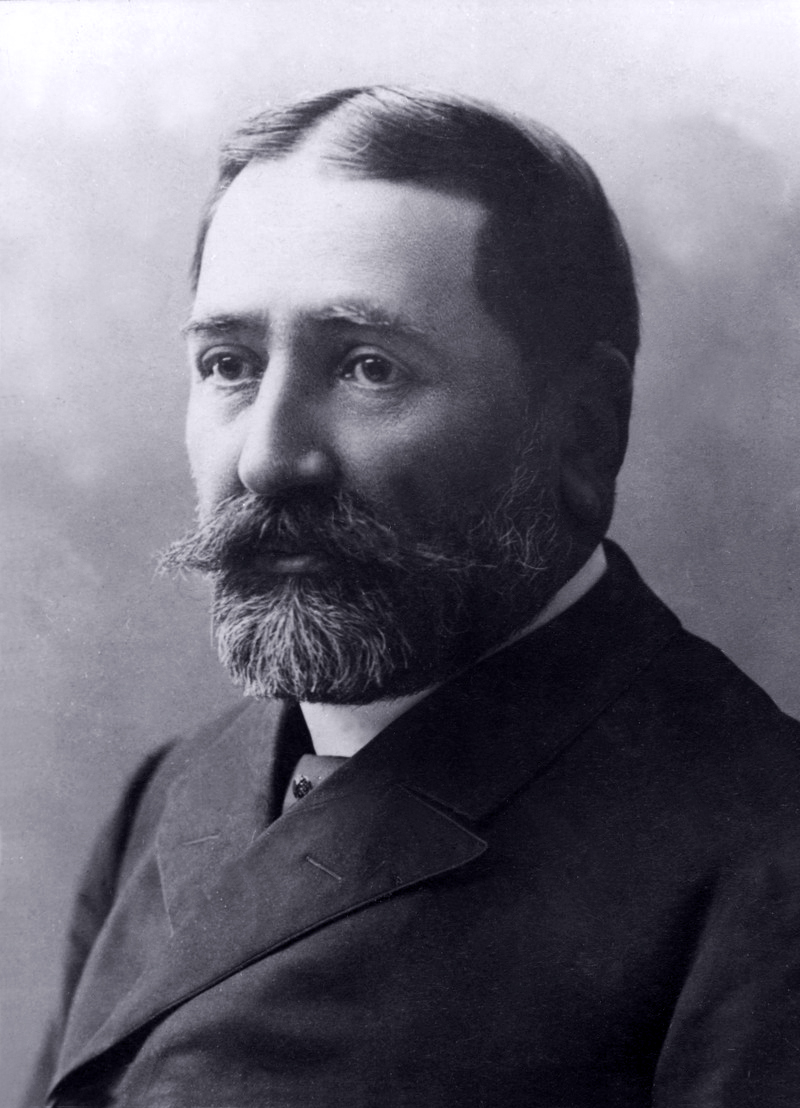
The first period liberalism in Georgia is closely associated with the leader of intellectual movement named "Tergdaleulebi" - prince Ilia Chavchavadze. Ilia Chavchavadze was a Georgian public figure, journalist, publisher, writer and poet who spearheaded the revival of the Georgian national movement in the second half of the 19th century and played a major role in the creation of Georgian civil society during the Russian rule of Georgia. He is Georgia's "most universally revered hero."

Liberalism in Georgia (Georgian: ლიბერალიზმი საქართველოში, romanized: liberalizmi sakartveloshi) is a political and moral philosophy based on what liberals consider the unalienable rights of the individual. The fundamental liberal ideals of freedom of speech, freedom of the press, freedom of religion, the separation of church and state, the right to due process and equality under the law are widely accepted as a common foundation of liberalism.

The history of liberalism in Georgia can be split into two periods: the first period began in 1860s with the Tergdaleulebi movement and ended in 1921, when Georgia was sovietized; the second period began in 1991 with Georgia declaring its independence from the Soviet Union. Liberalism in Georgia was persecuted severely both by the Russian Empire and the Soviet Union.

The first period liberalism in Georgia is closely associated with the leader of intellectual movement named "Tergdaleulebi" - prince Ilia Chavchavadze. Ilia Chavchavadze was a Georgian public figure, journalist, publisher, writer and poet who spearheaded the revival of the Georgian national movement in the second half of the 19th century and played a major role in the creation of Georgian civil society during the Russian rule of Georgia. He is Georgia's "most universally revered hero."

Five Georgian political parties - Republican, Free Democrats, Strategy Aghmashenebeli, Lelo and Girchi — More Freedom - are members of Alliance of Liberals and Democrats for Europe Party. The Europe-Georgia Institute is an affiliate member of European Liberal Forum.

== See also ==
- Anarchism in Georgia
- Georgian nationalism

== Sources ==
- Giorgi, Javakhishvili (2020). ლიბერალიზმი საქართველოში [Liberalism in Georgia] (in Georgian). Tbilisi, Georgia: Europe-Georgia Institute.
