= Krasen =

Krasen or Krassen (Bulgarian: Красен) may refer to:

== Places ==
- Krasen, Dobrich Province, Bulgaria
- Krasen, Ruse Province, in Ivanovo Municipality, Bulgaria
- Kråsen Crevasse Field, in Queen Maud Land, Antarctica

== Other uses ==
- Krasen (given name), including a list of people with the name Krasen or Krassen
- Krasen (fortress), in Pazardzhik Province, Bulgaria
