= Access to public information in Georgia =

Access to public information and freedom of information (FOI) refer to the right to access information held by public bodies also known as "right to know". Access to public information is considered of fundamental importance for the effective functioning of democratic systems, as it enhances governments' and public officials' accountability, boosting people participation and allowing their informed participation into public life. The fundamental premise of the right to access public information is that the information held by governmental institutions is in principle public and may be concealed only on the basis of legitimate reasons which should be detailed in the law.

Freedom of Information (FOI) in Georgia is regulated by chapter 3 of the General Administrative code of Georgia, which is in force since 1999. Despite the fact that the ensuring legal framework on freedom of information contains sound provisions, in view of the existing international standards and practices, as well as existing practices in Georgia, the act is considered outdated In 2013 the Organisation for Economic Cooperation and Development (OECD) Anti-Corruption Network noted that Georgia's FOI provisions would benefit from a comprehensive and wide revisions.

In recent years, Georgian civil society organisations have advocated for improvements of the law, and the Government took obligation to elaborate a new law on freedom of information. The adoption of a new Freedom of Information law is one of the Georgian Government's commitments in the framework of its annual action plan for the implementation of the Association Agreement between the EU and Georgia signed in 2014.

== Legal framework ==
The existing law states that all public information is open except for the cases established by the law and the information covered by privacy rights or commercial secret. In Georgia, anyone is entitled to request public information. The applicants do not have to specify the reasons for their request. An applicant has the option to be allowed to view the original of the information required or to ask for a copy. Requests for information should be made in writing, including via electronic means. Fees for the provision of public information are expressly prohibited by the law, except for covering the actual costs for producing copies.

Public institutions are obliged to provide the requested information immediately or not later than within 10 working days of the application. Applicants must be notified of the refusal to disclose information immediately and must be given, within 3 days of the refusal, a written explanation of the reason for denial and with information on the appeals procedures. In the appeal procedures, aiming at challenging the denial decision of a public institution, the burden of the proof lies with the public institutions.

The Georgian law also establishes that public bodies have to proactively publish information, that is without the need of sending a request, according to the rules set forth in secondary legislation, namely in the amendment made to the General Administrative Code of Georgia in 2012 on proactive disclosure and electronic request of public information.

Public institutions are obliged to report annually to Parliament, the President and the Prime Minister on their compliance with access to information law and provide updated statistics and data.

One of the most important novelties of the draft elaborated by civil society and experts is the establishment of the office of the Information Commissioner, a new institution with the mandate of monitoring the application of the law, revealing cases of misconduct and taking action to protect the right to public information. This would address one of the major gaps in existing legislation, i.e. the lack of a designed central body with the power to oversee the compliance of public institutions with existing regulations. Another shortcoming of the current legal framework concerns the lack of a sanctions system in cases of non-compliance. Also, the exceptions for non-disclosure are ambiguous and not clearly defined in the law which does not cover state-owned enterprises.

The shortcomings of the law have resulted in an uneven application of the right to access to information in practice. In this process, the judiciary has not proven to be an effective means of dealing with the refusals of some public institutions to push them to disclose the required information.

== Access to information in practice ==
Access to information law is poorly enforced in Georgia and its application remains a problem. A local NGO, the Institute for Development of Freedom of Information (IDFI), has conducted a comprehensive analysis assessing the implementation of the law and the compliance of public institutions to it, carrying out a series of large-scale FOI tests between 2010 and 2015.

The IDFI study shows that in the period monitored, 24% of the request filed by the organisation remained unanswered. A complete answer was received in 64% of cases and an incomplete one in 10%, while the refusal to provide the information required occurred in 2% of the cases. In terms of annual evaluation, the overall response rate was the worst in 2010–11, while it improved significantly in 2012-13 - as a result of the 2012 parliamentary elections - but started to deteriorate again in 2014. Over time, the rate of provision of the requested information within the deadline established by the law improved significantly, ranging from 22% of 2010 to 75% of 2015. The assessment also found out great variations between public agencies with regard to their compliance with the law: for instance, some ministers recorded a 100% response rate, others provided a complete answer in less than 50% of the cases, while the lowest score concerned the Ministry of Economy and Sustainable Development with a mere 10% in the rating.

== See also ==
- Access to public information in Europe
- Freedom of information
- Freedom of information laws by country
- Transparency of media ownership in Europe
- Media of Georgia
- Transparency of media ownership in Georgia
