= Vaziani (disambiguation) =

Vaziani (Georgian: ვაზიანი) may refer to several places and facilities in Georgia:

== Settlements ==
- Vaziani (Guria), a village in Chokhatauri Municipality, Guria region
- Vaziani (Kvemo Kartli), a village in Gardabani Municipality, Kvemo Kartli region — notable for its proximity to major military infrastructure
- Vaziani (Mtskheta-Mtianeti), a village in Mtskheta Municipality, Mtskheta-Mtianeti region — associated with the medieval Sumbiani Church

== Military and infrastructure ==
- Vaziani Military Base, a Georgian Armed Forces installation near the village of Vaziani (Gardabani)
- Vaziani Airfield, a former Soviet airstrip adjacent to the base, proposed for redevelopment as a civilian airport

== See also ==
- Vazisubani (disambiguation), a similar Georgian placename referring to several villages and a neighborhood in Tbilisi
