= Krasen (given name) =

Krasen or Krassen (Bulgarian: Красен) is a Bulgarian given name. People with the name include:

- Krasen Kralev (born 1967), Bulgarian businessman and politician
- Krassen Stanchev (fl. from 1998), Bulgarian economist and philosopher
- Krasen Trifonov (born 1983), Bulgarian football player
