= New Economic School – Georgia =

Free market think tank

- Formation: 2001
- Type: Think-tank
- Location: 77a, M.Kostava Ave., Tbilisi, Georgia
- Website: www.nes-g.org

The New Economic School – Georgia (NESG) (in Georgian: ახალი ეკონომიკური სკოლა საქართველო) is a free market think-tank, non-profit organization, NGO based in Tbilisi, Georgia. Its main mission is education of young people in free market ideas. It organizes seminars, workshops and conferences for education and exchanges of ideas. NESG was founded by Georgian individuals to fill the gap of the market economy knowledge in the country and the deficit of good teachers and economics textbooks. According to the 2014 Global Go To Think Tank Index Report (Think Tanks and Civil Societies Program, University of Pennsylvania), NESG was number 22 (of 45) "Top Think Tanks in Central Asia".

The name New Economic School means different vision, school of thought. NESG is not an academic institution but rather a voluntary cooperation of individuals to find more ideas about Human Action. NESG was established as an alternative to Marxian school which was very influential having an absolute monopoly in the academic circles and universities in Georgia.

== Vision ==
The NESG is an educational institution dedicated to promoting the free market system to young adults in Georgia and the South Caucasus. It supports aspiring politicians and journalists to research the differences in economic policies across the globe. The NESG promotes the economic frameworks of public choice and the Austrian school of economics, and teaches the philosophies of free market theorists like Adam Smith, Carl Menger, Ludwig von Mises, Friedrich Hayek, Milton Friedman, Ayn Rand, Murray Rothbard, James Buchanan, and Gordon Tullock.

== Activities ==
The NESG is partnered with a variety of European and American charitable foundations that help finance the school's seminars and publications, both of which are available for public access at no cost. The seminars and publications generally focus on themes of property rights, education, health, pensions, public transportation, and public finances, which they argue to be crucial knowledge in a developing Georgian society. In total, the NESG has organized 800 events with more than 35,000 participants, including citizens of more than 60 countries.

The NESG has sought to support reform efforts in Georgia through trainings of politicians, judges, journalists, and NGO representatives. They have invited to their campus several international reformers, including Mart Laar, the former prime minister of Estonia, Ruth Richardson, the former Finance Minister of New Zealand, and Lajos Bokros, the former Finance Minister of Hungary. They have also invited thinkers from the Economic Freedom network, including James Gwartney, Steve Hanke, Richard Ebeling, Tom Palmer, Andrei Illarionov, Krassen Stanchev, Pierre Garello, and Johan Norberg.

Current work by the NESG includes efforts to bring financial education to high school students, including through a translation of a Lithuanian economics textbook and the writing of its own textbook on business. The NESG has trained more than 800 high school teachers of economics and business.

== Web-sites ==
The NESG maintains a website with a collection of free-to-access articles, e-books, videos, and audio materials, intended to be used by young people who can't afford tuition at other institutions or expensive textbooks.

Most of the materials on the web-sites are in English and Georgian languages. There are also some e-books in Russian, Turkish, German and French.

== Freedom Library ==
NESG is home to the region's largest free market library, which is open to both local and foreign scholars. The books are mostly publications of the Liberty Fund and Mises Institute. The collection consists of about a thousand books and media.

== Publications ==
Publications of the NESG in Georgian: Library of Liberty volumes:

1. Basics of Liberalism, 2005
2. Liberalism and Power, 2006
3. Property and Liberty, 2007
4. Intellectuals, Education and Liberty, 2008
5. Liberal Reforms, 2009
6. Liberal Thinkers, 2010
7. Money of Liberty, 2011

Other publications:

- Adventures of Johnathan Gullible, Ken Schooland 2007, 2023
- Law and Which is Seen and Which is not seen, Frederic Bastiat, 2008
- Georgian Lectures, Tibor Machan, 2007
- Journalist's Guide to Economics, 2008
- Bureaucracy, Ludwig von Mises, 2013
- Freedom and the Law, Bruno Leoni, 2014
- Collection of Works, Frederick Bastiat, 2021
- Collection of Works, Ludwig von Mises, 2022
- Collection of Works, Friedrich von Hayek, 2022
- Power of Capitalism, Rainer Zitelmann, 2023
- Economics in One Lesson, Henry Hazlitt, 2024

== Think-Tank Networks ==
NESG is a member of several free market networks such as:

- Economic Freedom Network of the Fraser Institute of Canada (from 2004)
- World taxpayers Associations World Taxpayers Associations (2009)
- Free Market Road Show Free Market Road Show (2006)
- Atlas Network Atlas Network (2004)
- European Resource Bank Real-Estate Broker Europe (2005)
- Coalition for European Georgia (2011)
- Tea Party World Movement (2012)
- 4Liberty.eu (2020)

== NESG Partners ==
NESG has many local and foreign partners, including Friedrich Naumann Foundation (http://www.fnf.org/) Atlas Network (https://www.atlasnetwork.org/) University of Georgia (https://ug.edu.ge/) Free University of Tbilisi (https://freeuni.edu.ge/ge/) Free the People (https://freethepeople.org/) Tens of other valuable partners globally are included in the networks counted above.
