= George Melashvili =

Georgian scholar of political sciences and social activist

- Georgian: გიორგი მელაშვილი
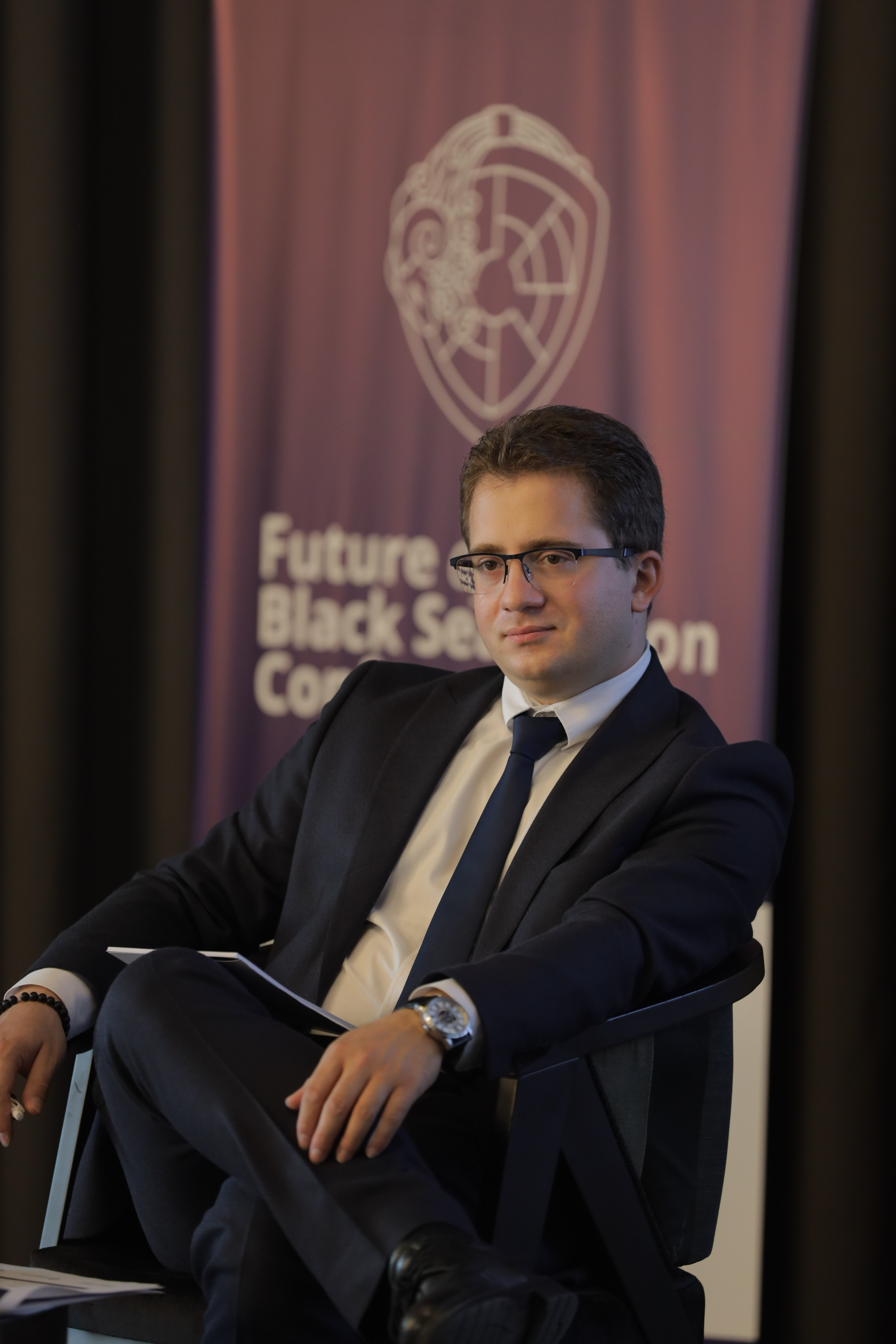
- Melashvili at the Future of the Black Sea Region (FLEECE) conference
- Born: April 20, 1994 (age 31); Tbilisi
- Citizenship: Georgia
- Education: • Free University of Tbilisi; • Tbilisi State University; • Malmo University
- Alma mater: Free University of Tbilisi
- Organization: Europe-Georgia Institute
- Notable work: Korea: Success story Lessons for Georgia
- Movement: Europe-Georgia Institute
- Relatives: Alexander Berulava (grandfather)
- Awards: • Mikheil Javakhishvili medal; • Janri Kashia Award; • SI Changemaker
- Website: mel.ge

George Melashvili (Georgian: გიორგი მელაშვილი) (born April 20, 1994) is a public figure, scholar of political sciences (specializing in comparative politics) and East Asian studies (specializing in Korea), and a civic activist who is the founder and president of the Europe-Georgia Institute, a hybrid non-governmental organization in Georgia since September 2016.

Under Melashvili's leadership the Europe-Georgia Institute transformed from a student organization into one of the leading civil society organizations in Georgia and became member of the European Liberal Forum, a European political foundation, and founded the London Security Conference, an annual event focusing on European frontlines that was originally established as the Black Sea Security conference.

He is affiliated with the German Marshall Fund of the United States (GMF), which named him a Policy Designers Network fellow in 2020 and a ReThink.CEE Fellow in 2025. He serves as an invited lecturer of International relations theory at the Free University of Tbilisi and East Asian studies at the University of Georgia.

On April 26, 2021 the Swedish Institute selected Melashvili as one of 10 SI Changemakers among more than 15 000 Swedish Institute alumni.

== Early life and family ==
Melashvili's family originates from Sukhumi, Abkhazia. He is the grandson of Alexander Berulava (1945–1993), a prominent journalist, writer, and human rights defender who founded the Georgian Television of Abkhazia. During the War in Abkhazia, Berulava served as the head of the Military Press-Center for the Council of Ministers. On 27 September 1993, when Sukhumi fell, Berulava refused to leave the besieged city alongside other government members, including Zhiuli Shartava and Guram Gabiskiria. He was captured and subsequently murdered by the Russian-backed forces during the ethnic cleansing of Georgians in Abkhazia. Amidst this family history, Melashvili's grandmother played a particularly significant and formative role in his upbringing, helping to shape his character and values.

=== Education ===
Melashvili graduated from the Free University of Tbilisi founded by Georgian statesman, visionary and philanthropist Kakha Bendukidze in 2016 with a degree in International Relations. During his bachelor studies, he received a scholarship from the Academy of Korean Studies to study South Korea’s economic development and democratic transition. He is also an alumnus of Haifa University program supported by the government of Israel and successfully graduated from Swedish Institute Summer Academy for Young Professionals (SAYP) in Malmö, Sweden.

== Career ==
George was one of the leaders of the Future Diplomats’ Club – a youth organizations in Georgia dedicated to contemporary international relations, diplomacy, civil politics and the rights of youth. He was selected as a member of Presidential Discussion Club hosted by the President of Georgia and was part of the team working on contemporary challenges of Georgia's neighborhood and the Black Sea Region, followed by a successful internship at the International Department of the Presidential Administration of Georgia.

During the 2016 Georgian parliamentary election, George Melashvili managed the unprecedented Get out the vote campaign “Your Voice, Our Future” uniting citizens of Georgia to realize the importance of their vote. The campaign mobilized 500 volunteers from Georgia's all regions and was held in Georgia's all 11 regions and the capital city and managed to increase the youth turnout by more than 20%. The campaign was followed by an #Initiative project aiming to increase youth participation in decision making and civic life and issued more 500 small scale grants were issued to support activities in more than 20 municipalities of Georgia.

George Melashvili also was a lecturer at the School of Diplomacy of the Free University. He served as the youth delegate at the Congress of Local and Regional Authorities of the Council of Europe and is actively involved in different initiatives promoting civic engagement, regional cooperation, and international development.

He is the holder of the first prize award for his essay about Janri Kashia’s book “Totalitarianism” and Mikheil Javakhishvili Medal for a documentary film about Soviet repressions, and is the winner of the MLOW contest held by the United Nations Academic Impact and was invited to the United Nations to make a speech about the UN Sustainable Development Goals.

During the opening event of the "Europe in a suitcase" project held by the Europe-Georgia Institute and the Friedrich Naumann Foundation, Melashvili initiated the Oliver Wardrop Discussions to bring together British and Georgian politicians and young leaders and foster dialogue and cooperation between the countries. The first Wardrop Discussion was held on the 22-nd of October, 2019 and featured former Georgian Ambassador to the UK Giorgi Badridze, the representative of British Liberal Democrats Imad Ahmed and others.

=== Korea: Success Story ===
Melashvili is the author of the first academic work about Korea written in Georgian - Korea: Success story /Lessons for Georgia. The author tells the history of Korea, researches Korea's economic development, politics and Korean culture. The presentation of the book was held at the book was hosted by the National Parliamentary Library of Georgia and attended by guests from the academia, Ministry of Foreign Affairs of Georgia and other organizations. The publication of the book was supported the Korea Foundation (KF) and Embassy of Korea to Georgia.

== Publications ==
- Melashvili, George (2025), The Diffusion of Authoritarian Regimes and the Russian Handbook, London, UK: Zinc Network, p. 25
- Melashvili, George (2021), Korea – Success Story / Lessons for Georgia, Tbilisi, Georgia: Free University Press, p. 355
- Melashvili, George; Kyrsich, Daria; Chachua, Mariam; Andguladze, Giorgi (2020), Building Resilient, Sustainable, and Integrated Economies in the Eastern Partnership Countries, German Marshall Fund of the United States (GMF), archived from the original on December 22, 2020
