= Europe-Georgia Institute =

Non-governmental organization in Georgia

- ევროპულ-ქართული ინსტიტუტი

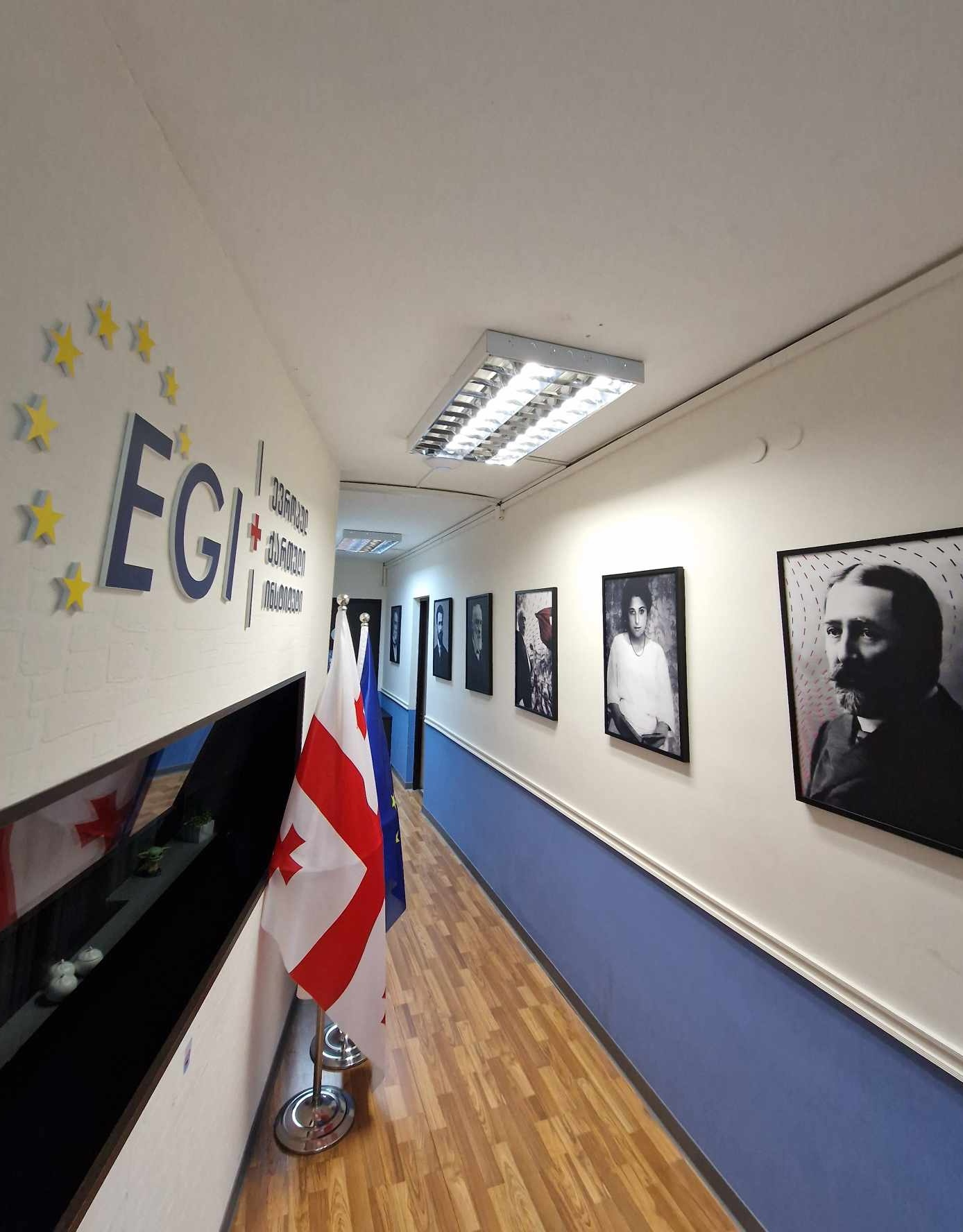
- Interior of the Europe-Georgia Institute
- Abbreviation: EGI
- Formation: 1 July 2015; 11 years ago
- Founder: George Melashvili, Shalva Chkheidze, Revaz Topuria
- Type: NGO / think tank / Foundation
- Tax ID no.: 404 496 700
- Legal status: Nonprofit organization
- Purpose: Advancing democracy, human rights, peacebuilding, promotion of good governance, support the involvement of youth in democratic process.
- Headquarters: Tbilisi, Georgia
- Methods: Lobbying research consultancy
- Official language: Georgian, English
- President: George Melashvili
- Executive Director: Shalva Chkheidze
- Main organ: Board
- Affiliations: European Liberal Forum
- Website: egi.ge

Europe-Georgia Institute (EGI) (Georgian: ევროპულ-ქართული ინსტიტუტი) – is a non-governmental organization and a pro-European think tank in Georgia. The Europe-Georgia Institute was founded by George Melashvili, Shalva Chkheidze and Revaz Topuria in 2015.

The EGI states its mission is to advance democracy, the rule of law and free markets in Georgia and the Caucasus and empower a new generation of leaders to find solutions that are essential for Georgia’s development and for successful common future of the Caucasus. The EGI focuses its campaigning on issues, such as human rights, peacebuilding, promotion of good governance and supporting the involvement of youth in democratic process.

Together with EGI's volunteers and partner organizations all around Georgia and the Caucasus, and with support from different donors, the EGI works hard to improve Georgia's political culture, to provide a platform for policy level discussions and to enable citizens to make their voices heard. The EGI is the only organization in Georgia that implemented a nationwide Get out the vote campaign in 2016.

An essential area of the Institute's work is cooperation with youth. The Europe-Georgia Institute recognizes that young people have a specific role in society and face particular challenges. The Institute focuses on youth work and supports equality and non-discrimination and aims to ensure that all policies and activities concerning young people uphold young people's right to participate in the development, implementation, and follow-up of policies affecting them. To achieve this aim, the EGI encourages and promotes inclusive democratic participation of all young people in society and democratic processes, actively engages young people in the development, implementation, and evaluation of policies affecting the lives of young people. The EGI cooperates with all major Universities in Georgia and supports specific frameworks and activities to empower youth and ensure youth participation.

The Europe-Georgia Institute also analyzes Georgian and international politics, creates policy recommendations, and develops projects which contribute to a more open, democratic, and free society. A crucial area of work of the Institute is integration with European and Euro-Atlantic partners. The Institute aims to facilitate a broad civil consensus regarding foreign political issues. The EGI implements different actions to increase political literacy among various communities and created methodologies to increase civic participation.

The EGI emphasizes "independence and impartiality", and explicitly precludes political, economic, or religious factors in its decision making. EGI's principles and operational guidelines are highlighted in its Charter.

The Europe-Georgia Institute is an affiliate member of the European Liberal Forum, a European political foundation.

== Projects ==
=== Your Voice, Our Future (YVOF) Campaign ===
The Europe-Georgia Institute, under the patronage and financial support from President Giorgi Margvelashvili, initiated the unprecedented campaign "Your Voice, Our Future" (YVOF), aiming to increase the involvement of Youth in the election process and to show the importance of one single vote.

The core idea of this project was the importance of a vote for future generations, focusing on the fact that in Georgia the Youth usually is less active in elections than any other age groups.

Enjoying unprecedented support from President Giorgi Margvelashvili, the Europe-Georgia Institute created a network of 500 young men and women from all around Georgia and held an unprecedented campaign to promote participation in elections; later, the participants of "Your Voice, Our Future" became core of the #Initiative project, aiming to increase the participation of Youth in civil life.

=== #ConstitutionBelongsToAll – Constitution Day 2017 Campaign ===
The Constitution of Georgia was approved by the Parliament of Georgia on 24 August 1995. Since then the 24-th of August is celebrated as the Day of Constitution – to highlight this important date, the Europe-Georgia Institute initiated various projects. As a result, more than 40 activities were held to promote constitutional values and raise awareness on constitution in 28 different regions of Georgia.

=== #Initiative Project ===
The #Initiative Project aimed to create a network of active students to promote active civic life. During the project more than 500 activities were financed in more than 20 regions of Georgia, 5 summer and winter schools were organized to empower the active youth groups all over Georgia. As a result of the project a nationwide youth network of active citizens was created, these groups are united under #Initiative network and are coordinating and collaborating on local and national issues

=== Eastern Partnership and Visegrad Countries Countering Disinformation ===
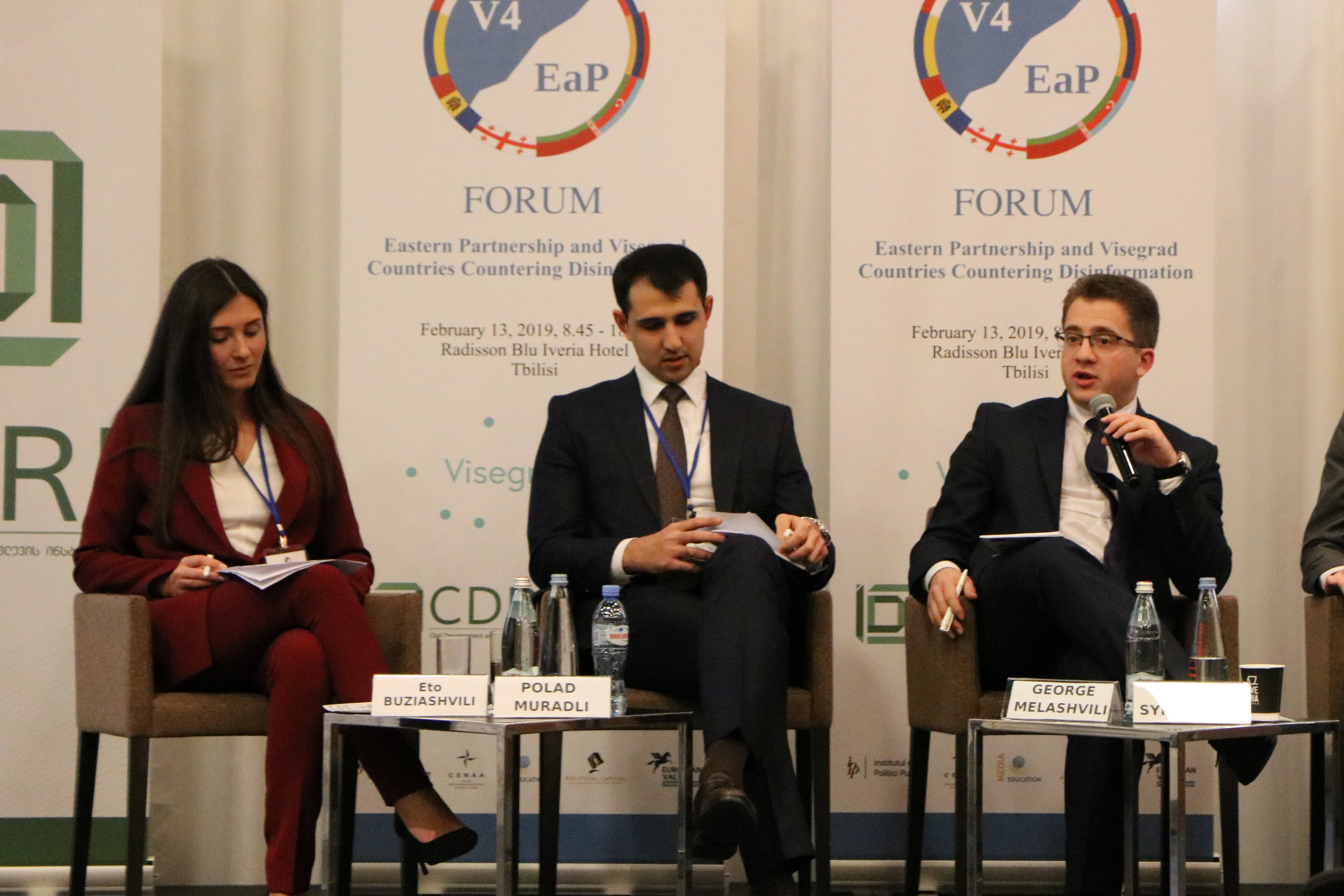
The last session of EaP&V4 Countries Countering Disinformation titled Disinformation and the Youth Resilience: Forging a New Generation of Leaders. from left to right: Eto Buziashvili, International Security Expert, (Georgia); Polad Muradli, Baku-based Independent Expert (Azerbaijan); George Melashvili, President of the Europe-Georgia Institute (Georgia).

One of the important achievements of the institute was the forum Eastern Partnership and Visegrad Countries Countering Disinformation. The forum took place on 13 February 2019. The Europe-Georgia Institute organized the forum Eastern Partnership and Visegrad Countries Countering Disinformation in cooperation with the Civil Development and Research Institute with financial support from Visegrad Fund. Key speakers were intensively discussing the existing challenges of a democratic society, threats and different means of countering disinformation in both developing and developed countries.

The event was dedicated to the security topics in the era of informational and smart technologies, countering disinformation and handling media challenges. The opening speech was held by the Ambassador of Ukraine to Georgia Igor Dolgov and Chargé d’Affaires of Czech Republic Jiri Preclik.

The primary goal of the project was to develop innovative approaches to fight Russian propaganda and other hybrid threats in the Caucasus region. The emphasis is put on improving media literacy and critical thinking skills in EaP and V4 communities. The forum consisted of 4 sessions: session 1 – Disinformation – Global Threat to Democracy?; session 2 – Impact of Disinformation on the EaP&V4 Communities; session 3 – Fake News and General Public: How to Stand Up to Disinformation?; session 4 – Disinformation and the Youth Resilience: Forging a New Generation of Leaders.

The last session of EaP&V4 Countries Countering Disinformation titled Disinformation and the Youth Resilience: Forging a New Generation of Leaders moderated by George Melashvili, President of the Europe-Georgia Institute (Georgia) and featured Eto Buziashvili, International Security Expert, (Georgia); Jonas Syrovatka, Programme Manager, Prague Security Studies Institute (Czech Republic); Zviad Adzinbaia, Founder and Visionary at Temocracy, (Georgia); Polad Muradli, Baku-based Independent Expert (Azerbaijan) and Artsiom Sizincau, journalist, Civil Society Research Center (Belarus).

=== Landmine free South Caucasus ===
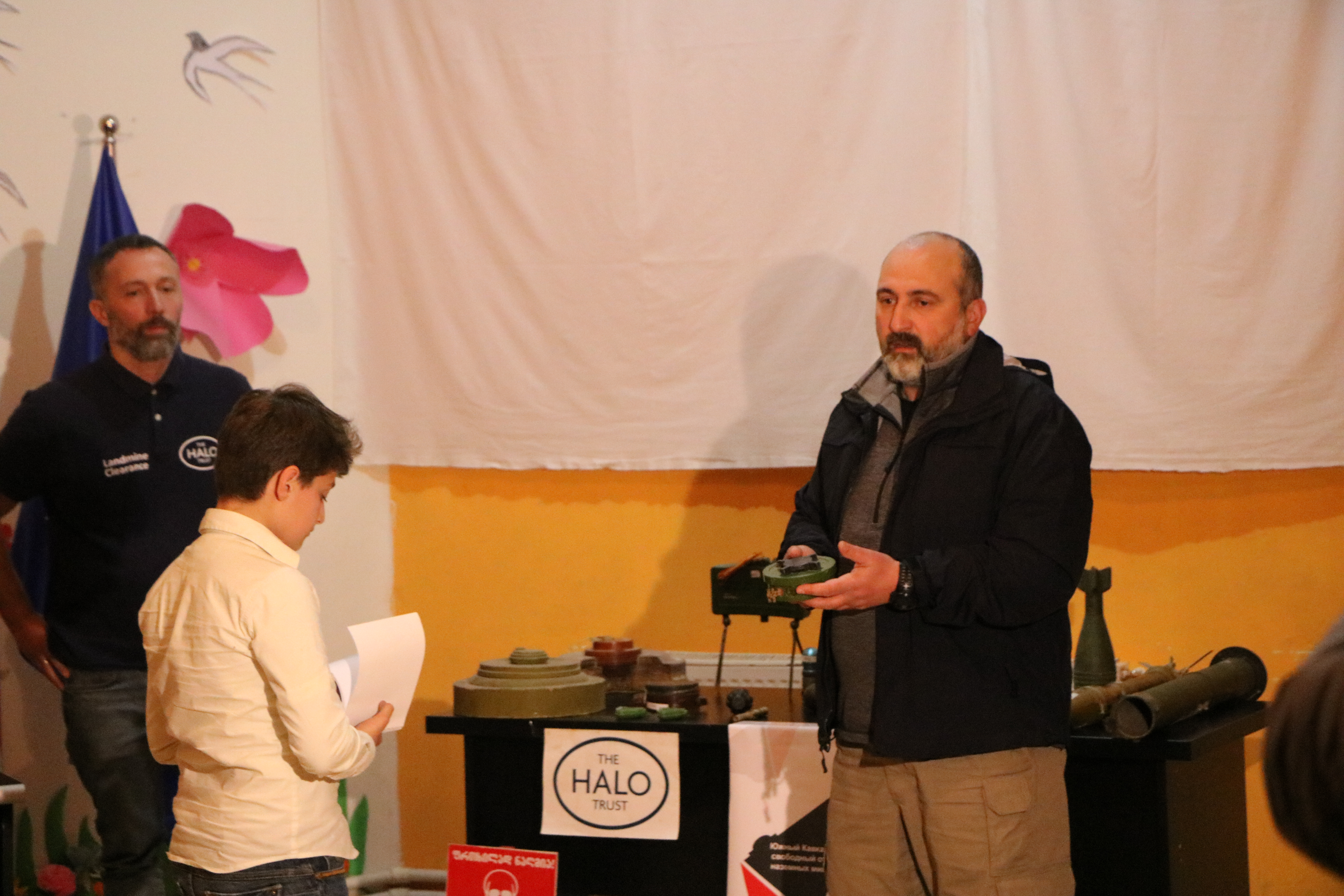
HALO Trust staff members explaining the danger of mines to school students in Tbilisi during the "Landsmine Free Caucasus" campaign organized by the Europe-Georgia Institute and LiNKS.

The Europe-Georgia Institute and LiNKS, with a number of other partners, marked the International Mine Awareness day on the 4th of April with a region-wide awareness campaign under the slogan “#Landmine free South Caucasus”. The campaign which ran from 4-10 held a number events in different of cities and districts of the region, and featured information material in Armenian, Azerbaijani, Georgian, Russian and English.

School children from the IDP community in Tbilisi were informed about danger of landmines. Addressing the event, Dennis Sammut, the Director of LINKS, the organization that is co-ordinating the campaign Landmines Free South Caucasus, said that it was important that the messages of the campaign were being brought to the refugee and IDP community. In his introductory speech to the campaign, George Melashvili, the chairman of EGI, highlighted the necessity of peace message to be sent to Georgia's occupied regions.

The event in Yerevan highlights humanitarian aspects of demining work. After the end of the Round table Meeting participants joined a street action on Yerevan's Northern Avenue where children expressed their feelings on International Mine Awareness day through positive messages painted on the ground, whilst demining experts explained the process of demining to visitors to a special set up stand.

=== Freedom of Speech Campaign - 2019 ===
Following statements of high-ranking Georgian officials threatening freedom of speech in Georgia, the Europe-Georgia Institute together with Institute for Development of Freedom of Information and with support from Friedrich Naumann Foundation for Freedom South Caucasus initiated a campaign “Freedom of Speech 2019”.

=== Europe in a suitcase ===
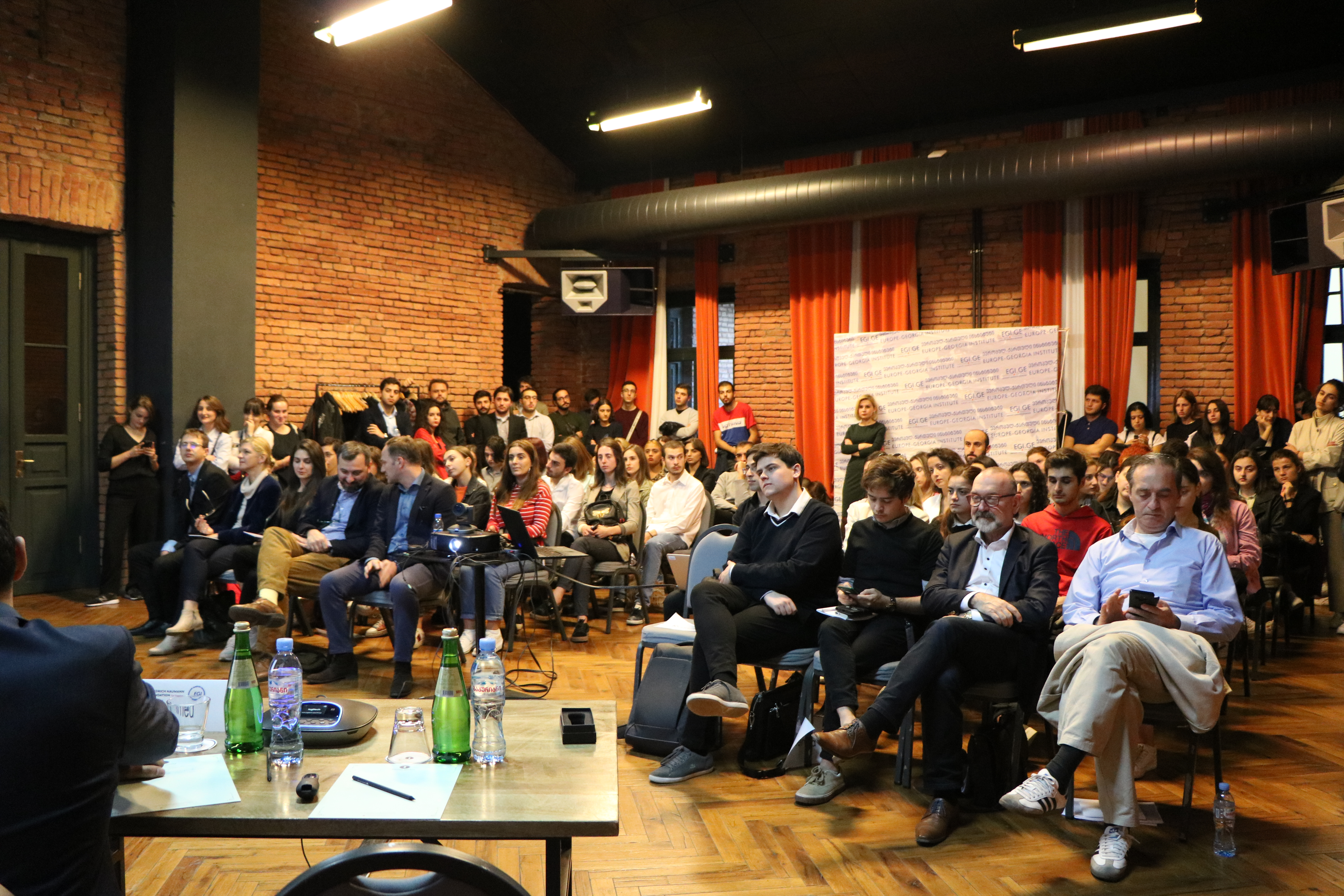
The launch of the project.

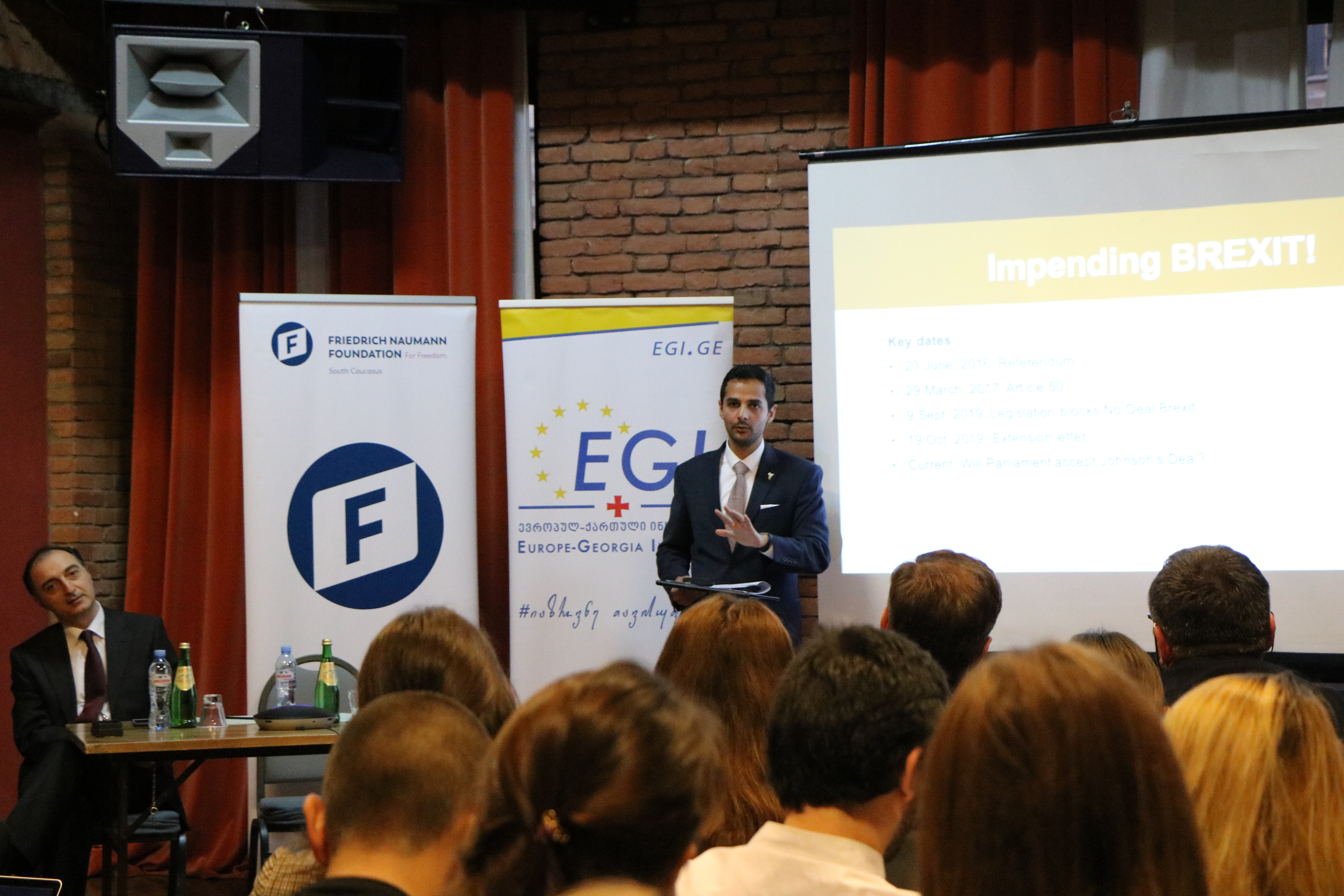
Amb. Giorgi Badridze and Imad Ahmed.

The Europe-Georgia Institute and the Friedrich Naumann Foundation invited a group of European politicians, journalists and representatives of civic sector and academia to Georgia within the Europe in a suitcase project.

The opening event of the "Europe in a suitcase" project was dedicated to the United Kingdom and was held on 22 October 2019. The presenters were a representative of British Liberal Democrats, Imad Ahmed, an economist and a PhD researcher at University College London, who spoke about “The current political situation in the UK and the role of the Liberal Democrats in British politics” and former Ambassador of Georgia to the United Kingdom Ambassador Giorgi Badridze, who made a presentation about “Brexit: Implications for Britain and Europe”.

This meeting was the first attempt to create a tradition of Oliver Wardrop Discussions aiming to bring together British and Georgian politicians and young leaders and foster dialogue and cooperation between the countries and will be held annually.

After the opening in Tbilisi the project continued in Khashuri with presentation by participant from Bosnia and Herzegovina Dr. Valida Repova Niksic on Ethno-nationalist populism in Bosnia and Herzegovina and in Gori with the presentation by participant from Ukraine Dr. Dmitro Iarovyi on Winner takes it all: Ukrainian society during and after the monocoalition of the presidential party in the Parliament. The participants also visited the occupation line in Khurvaleti. The next day participants visited Marneuli, where Ataberk Ozcan, participant from Turkey, spoke on Between support and confrontation: Civic society, Media facing populism and Mtskheta, with Georgian participant Salome Rurua speaking about Populism as a threat to the global peace.

The final meeting was held in Telavi with a presentation by participant from Armenia Asya Malamyan on Are all populists the same (Observation of Political Agendas of Populists in post-soviet Countries) and followed by a presentation by a participant from Russia Nikita Lyakhovetskiy speaking about Populism in modern day Russia.

The “Europe in a suitcase” is the continuation of an international project series which up to 2013 had been implemented by the European Academy Berlin with the support of the Robert Bosch Stiftung and other foundations.
