= Vaziani Military Base =

Airport in Georgia

Vaziani Military Base
- ვაზიანის სამხედრო ბაზა
- Vaziani, Gardabani Municipality in Georgia
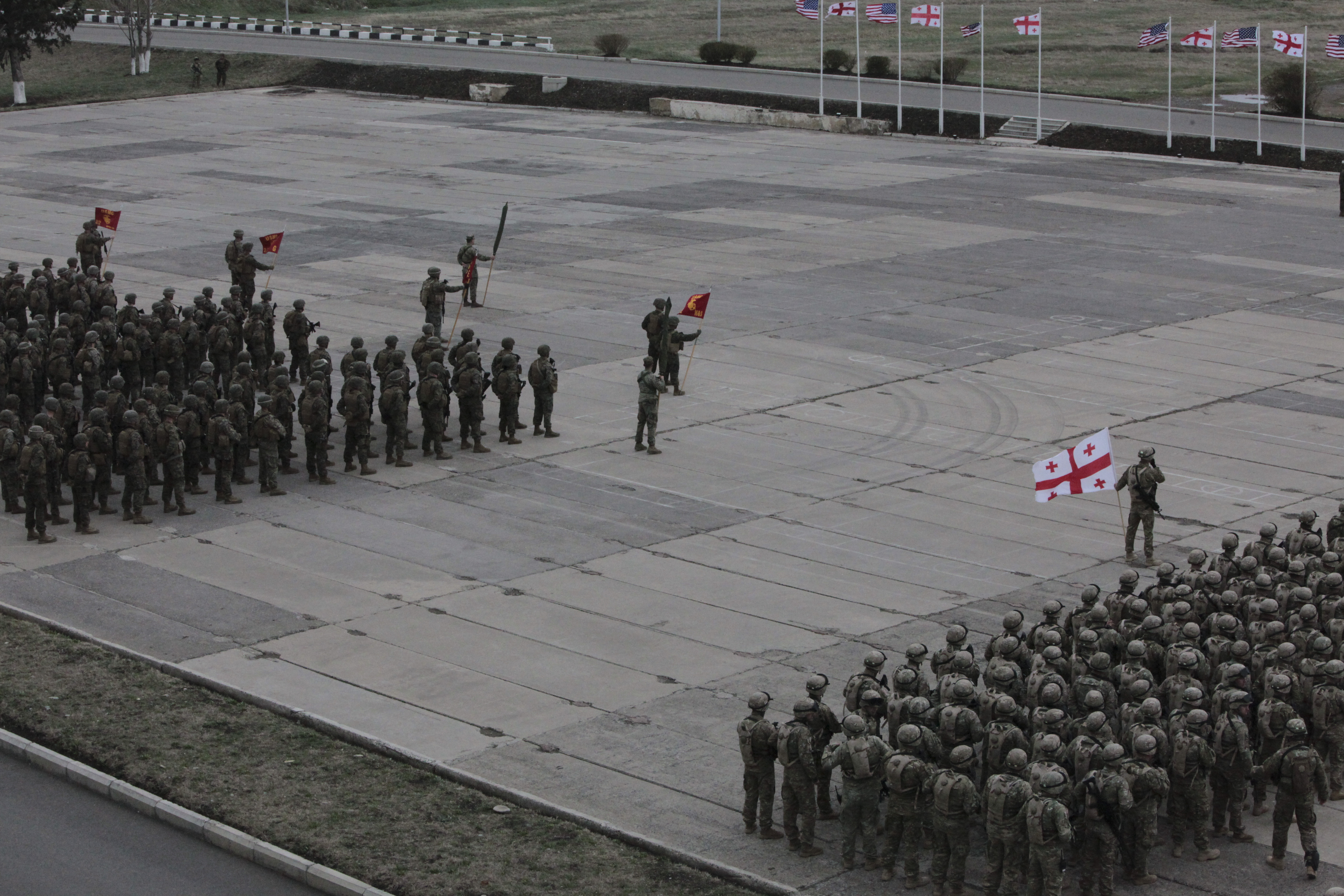
- Joint U.S.-Georgian drills at Vaziani Military Base, March 2018

Site information
- Type: Army base and training facility
- Owner: Ministry of Defence of Georgia
- Operator: Defence Forces of Georgia
- Open to the public: No
- Condition: Active
- Nearby airstrip: Vaziani Air Base

Location
- Coordinates: 41°41′40.92″N 45°2′48.12″E

Site history
- Built: 1941
- Built for: Soviet Armed Forces
- Materials: Concrete, brick, steel
- Battles/wars: Russo–Georgian War (2008) – bombed by Russian air force
- Events: Withdrawal of Russian troops (2001); Agile Spirit exercises (2011-2023); Bombed during the Russo–Georgian War (2008)

Garrison information
- Garrison: Eastern Command
- Occupants: 4th Mechanized Brigade; 23rd Infantry Battalion

Vaziani Military Base (Georgian: ვაზიანის სამხედრო ბაზა) is a major military installation of the Georgian Defence Forces, located near the village of Vaziani, southeast of Tbilisi, in Kvemo Kartli, Georgia. Originally constructed in 1941 as a Soviet Army base, it remained under Russian control until 2001, when it was formally transferred to the Georgian government. Today, Vaziani serves as a key operational, training, and deployment hub for the Eastern Command of the Georgian Land Forces, hosting several major units, including the 4th Mechanized Brigade and the 23rd Infantry Battalion. The base served as a central venue for multinational military exercises, such as Agile Spirit and Noble Partner, before the suspension of Georgia's military ties to Western countries in 2024. Adjacent to the base is the former Vaziani Air Base, a Soviet-era airstrip occasionally used for support operations.

== Overview ==
Vaziani Military Base is one of the largest and most strategically significant military installations in Georgia, located near the village of Vaziani in Gardabani Municipality, Kvemo Kartli region. Originally established in 1941 as part of the Soviet Union's southern military infrastructure, the base has served various military functions over the course of its history, including housing mechanized infantry, armored units, and support elements. Following the collapse of the Soviet Union, the base remained under Russian control until the final withdrawal of Russian forces from Georgia in 2001.

Since regaining full control of the facility, the Georgian Ministry of Defence has modernized and expanded the base to serve as a key operational center for the Georgian Defence Forces, particularly the Eastern Command. Vaziani has hosted multiple international training exercises, including Agile Spirit and Noble Partner, involving NATO and U.S. forces. It is also home to the 4th Mechanized Brigade and the 23rd Infantry Battalion.

Vaziani Military Base is located adjacent to, but distinct from, Vaziani Air Base (ICAO: UG27), a former Soviet airfield that remains in limited use. While the airstrip was a frequent site of Soviet air operations, the land-based facilities closer to the village have functioned primarily as an army garrison and training ground. During the 2008 Russo–Georgian War, the base was targeted in multiple Russian airstrikes but remained operational.

Today, Vaziani remains a central hub of Georgia's land force readiness and international military cooperation. Though not open to the public, it is frequently referenced in joint defense planning and multinational exercises in the South Caucasus region.

== History ==
=== Soviet era ===
Vaziani Military Base was established by the Soviet Union in 1941 as part of its southern military infrastructure in the Transcaucasian Military District. Situated just southeast of Tbilisi, the base played a strategic role in projecting Soviet power in the South Caucasus, both during World War II and throughout the Cold War.

During the early Soviet period, the installation developed into a large combined-arms facility. It comprised a motorized rifle regiment, support units, and access to the adjacent Vaziani Airfield, which became home to several fighter aviation units under Soviet Air Defense Forces and the Soviet Air Force. Throughout the Cold War, Vaziani hosted elements of the 171st Motor Rifle Division and other Soviet ground units, many of which were tied to the defense of the Caucasus region and the southern approaches to the Soviet Union.

By the 1980s, Vaziani was one of the Soviet Army’s most important garrisons in the Georgian SSR. The base was reported to host not only mechanized forces but also armored and artillery units, as well as a weapons storage facility and officer training infrastructure. Its strategic location near Tbilisi also made it suitable for command and control functions. While Soviet sources did not always disclose the full composition of forces at Vaziani, Western defense intelligence identified the base as an essential Soviet staging ground for both regional defense and rapid deployment.

The airfield adjacent to the military base—often collectively referred to as part of the broader Vaziani installation—was used by the Soviet Air Force's 34th Fighter Aviation Regiment, equipped at various times with MiG‑21 and MiG‑29 aircraft.

Although the Georgian SSR did not witness armed conflict during the Soviet period, Vaziani's prominence as a Cold War asset ensured it remained heavily staffed and maintained throughout the 1970s and 1980s. Some sources also indicate that Soviet nuclear warheads may have been stored in facilities near Vaziani, though no official confirmation has been released.

=== Post-independence (1990-2001) ===
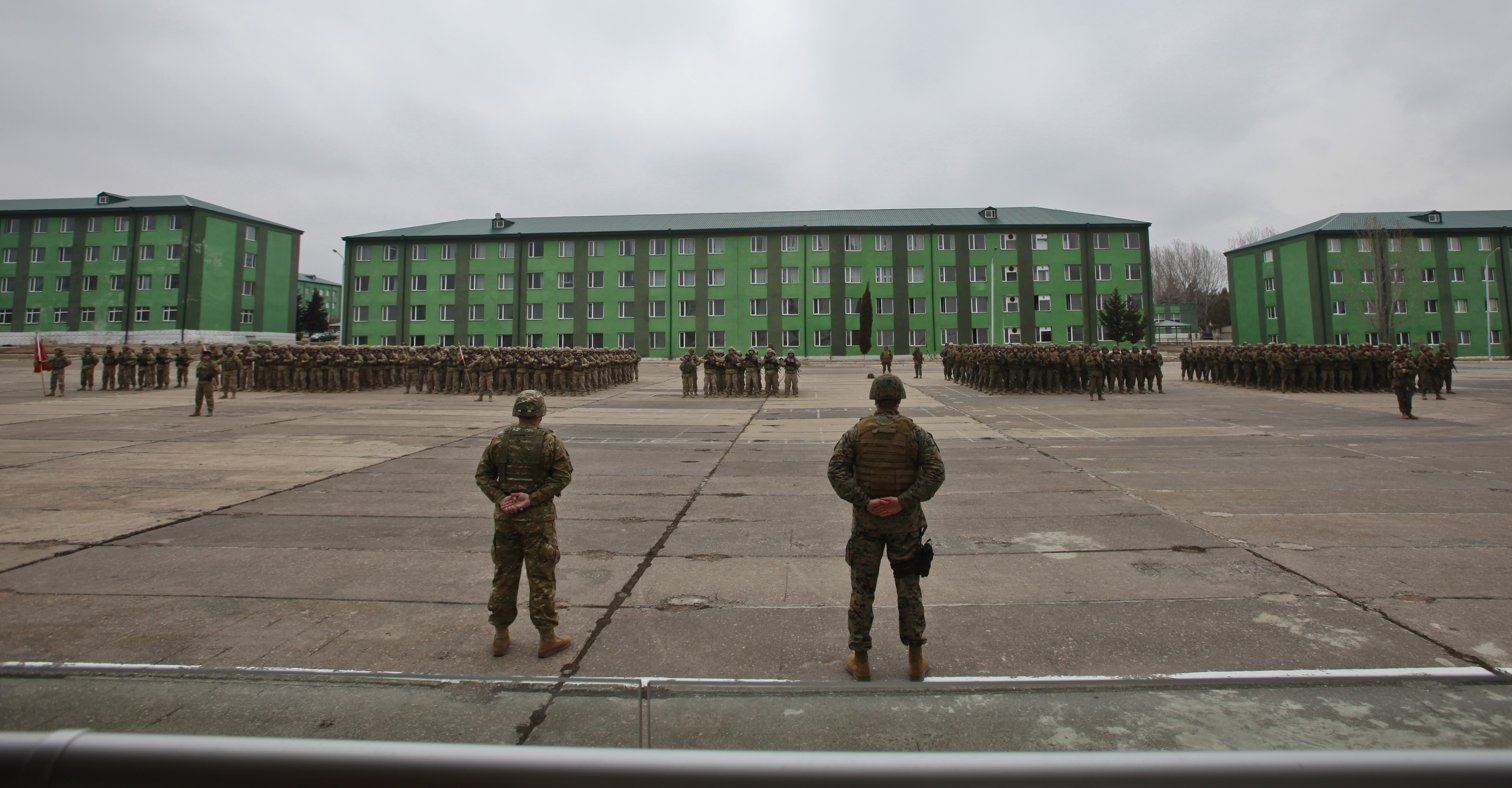
Georgian and U.S. Marines standing in formation at Vaziani during Agile Spirit 2012

Following Georgia's declaration of independence in 1991, Vaziani Military Base remained under the control of the Russian Federation, which had inherited former Soviet military infrastructure across the region. Alongside bases in Gudauta, Akhalkalaki, and Batumi, Vaziani was one of four key Russian military installations in Georgia during the 1990s. The continued Russian military presence on Georgian soil became a subject of growing political and diplomatic contention as Georgia sought to reorient toward Euro-Atlantic institutions and away from the CIS. It is believed that Igor Giorgadze, a rebellious Security Minister, fled Georgia via military plane at the Vaziani base after organizing a terrorist attack against the life of President Eduard Shevardnadze in August 1995.

Under the terms of the 1999 OSCE Istanbul Summit, Russia agreed to withdraw from the Vaziani and Gudauta bases and to begin negotiations over the future of its remaining military installations in Akhalkalaki and Batumi. The Russian withdrawal from Vaziani was completed in late June 2001, though other Russian military installations remained contentious for years to come.

Shortly after the transfer, in January 2002, Georgian military officials reported the discovery of four radiation sources at the base. The radioactive materials, which had been left behind by the Russian military, raised significant safety and environmental concerns. Although the sources were reportedly secured and later removed, the incident further strained Russo–Georgian military relations and intensified domestic calls for full Georgian control over all former Soviet military infrastructure.

=== Modern era (2001-present) ===
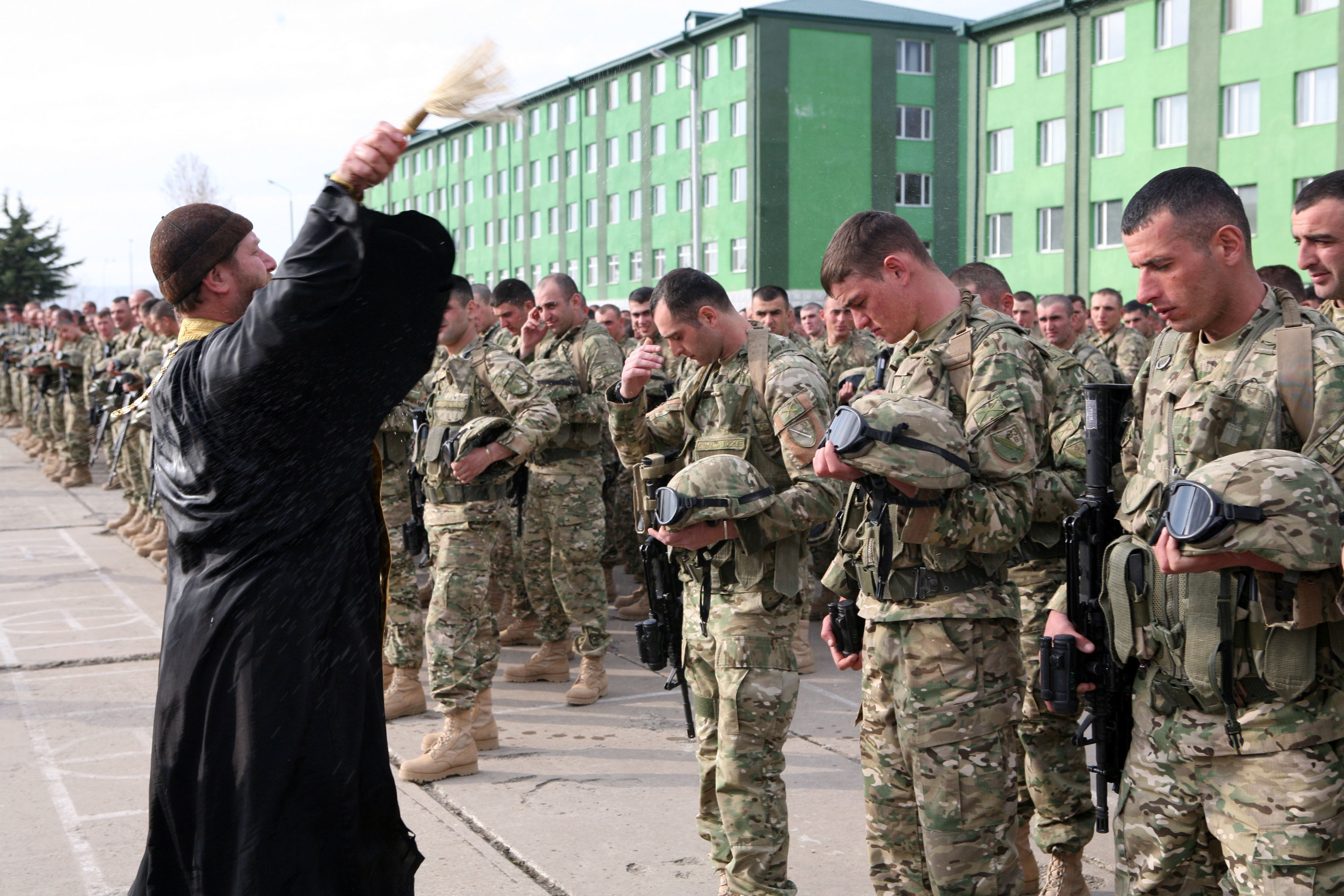
33rd Light Infantry Battalion departing from Vaziani for deployment to Afghanistan, 2011

Following the Russian military withdrawal in June 2001, Vaziani Military Base was formally integrated into the structure of the Georgian Armed Forces under the Ministry of Defence. In the years that followed, the base underwent a gradual transformation from a former Soviet garrison into a core component of Georgia's land defense infrastructure. As part of a broader effort to professionalize and modernize the Georgian military, Vaziani became the permanent home of several key units, including the 4th Mechanized Brigade and the 23rd Infantry Battalion under the Eastern Command.

By the mid-2000s, Vaziani had emerged as a central hub for Georgia's growing defense cooperation with the United States and NATO. Beginning in 2011, the base began hosting annual joint exercises under the Agile Spirit program, designed to enhance interoperability between Georgian forces and NATO partners. Vaziani has also served as a key training and deployment site for other multinational drills such as Noble Partner, further solidifying its role in the country's Euro-Atlantic integration efforts, while other multinational exercises took place at Vaziani irregularly since 2002 (most notably, Immediate Response 2008 took place at the base days before the beginning of the 2008 Russian invasion of Georgia).

On August 9, 2008, during the Russo–Georgian War, Vaziani Military Base was targeted by the Russian Air Force as part of a wider campaign to disable Georgian military infrastructure. Multiple airstrikes were reported near Tbilisi, including confirmed bombings of the Vaziani base, although no casualties were recorded. Despite the damage sustained, the base remained operational and was quickly restored to readiness following the end of hostilities.

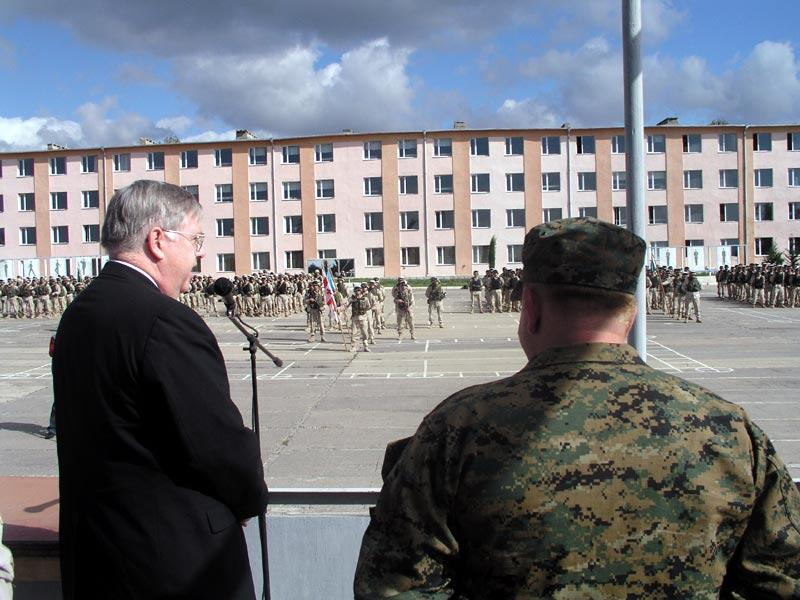
U.S. Ambassador John Tefft addressing Georgia's 13th Light Infantry Battalion at Vaziani Military Base, October 9, 2005

In the years following the 2008 war, Georgia accelerated its military reforms and deepened its defense ties with NATO. Vaziani continued to host large-scale international training operations and has been upgraded to support Georgia's increasingly professional and mobile land forces. As of the 2020s, the base remains one of the most active and strategically important military installations in the country, even though the 2024 suspension of the U.S.-Georgia Strategic Partnership Charter has put a halt to multinational exercises.

== Role ==
Vaziani Military Base serves as one of the primary operational and training installations of the Georgian Defence Forces, specifically supporting the Georgian Land Forces under the Eastern Command. Located just outside the capital, Tbilisi, the base plays a key role in hosting active-duty brigades, multinational exercises, and rapid deployment preparation.

The base houses several combat and support units, including the 4th Mechanized Brigade and the 23rd Infantry Battalion, both of which are core components of Georgia's standing military capability. In addition to permanent units, Vaziani has routinely hosted temporary detachments for training rotations and joint operations with allied forces.

Vaziani functions as a logistical and operational hub for both national and international activities. Since the early 2010s, it has hosted large-scale joint exercises such as Agile Spirit and Noble Partner, involving NATO member states and regional allies. These exercises focus on enhancing interoperability, mission readiness, and multinational command coordination, particularly in scenarios involving hybrid threats and rapid response.

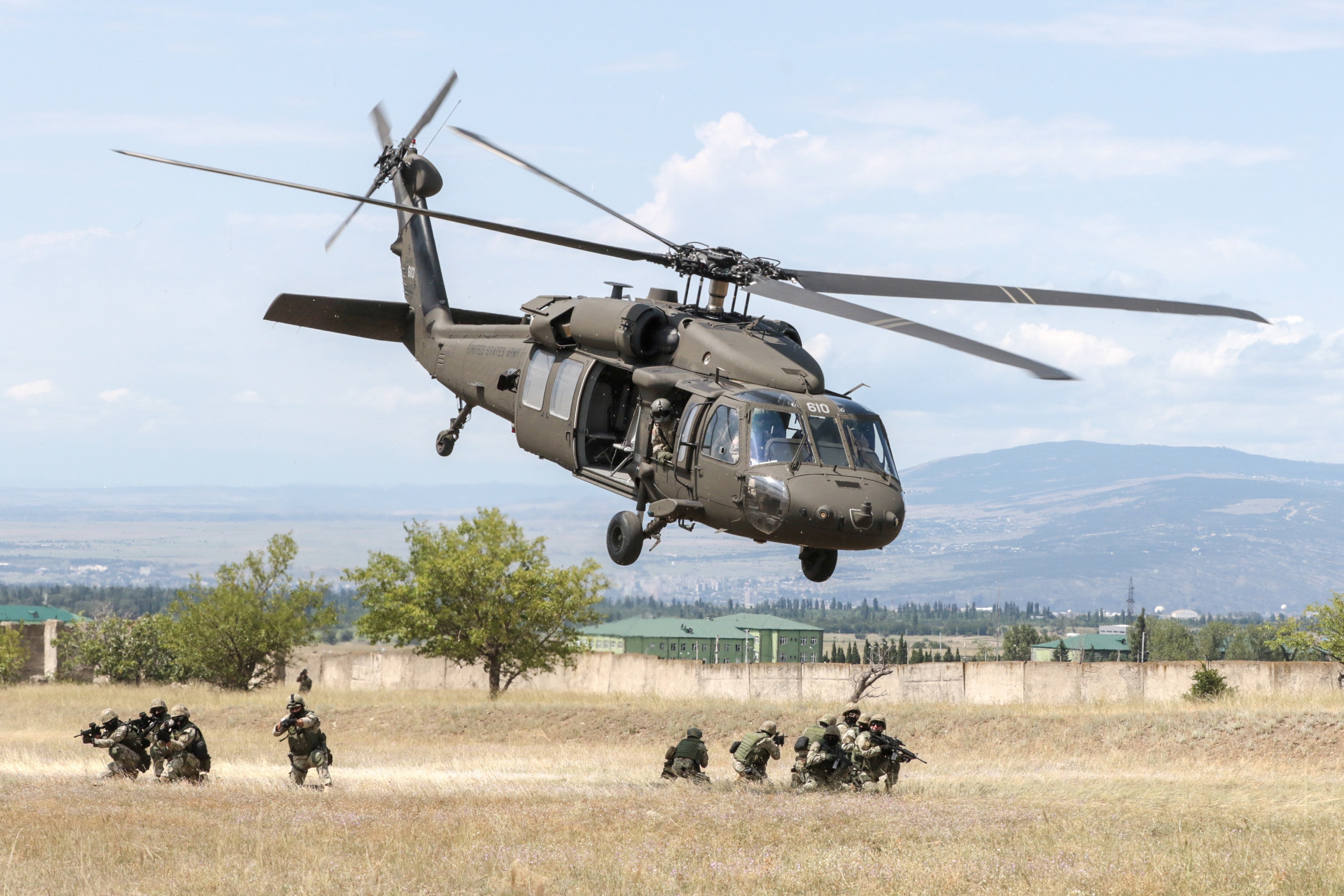
Georgian Special Forces inserting during an urban operations exercise at Vaziani Training Area, August 5, 2018

The installation also supports training operations for Georgia's participation in international peacekeeping missions, including deployments to Afghanistan (ISAF/Resolute Support), Iraq, and Central African Republic. Training and evaluation programs conducted at Vaziani are coordinated in cooperation with NATO standards, and the base had frequently hosted observers and trainers from the United States and European countries before 2024 and the suspension of military ties between Georgia and Western countries.

Though formally separate, the nearby Vaziani Air Base provides additional logistical flexibility for airborne troop movement and aerial support, thus enhancing the strategic relevance of the land forces installation.

== Major units ==
Vaziani Military Base is home to several core units of the Georgian Land Forces, most notably under the operational jurisdiction of the Eastern Command. The base supports both active-duty combat formations and training elements essential to Georgia's national defense structure.

The most prominent unit stationed at Vaziani is the 4th Mechanized Brigade, one of Georgia's primary standing combat brigades. The brigade includes mechanized infantry battalions, armored and artillery components, as well as combat support and logistics elements. It is considered a high-readiness formation and has participated in multiple international training exercises and peacekeeping deployments.

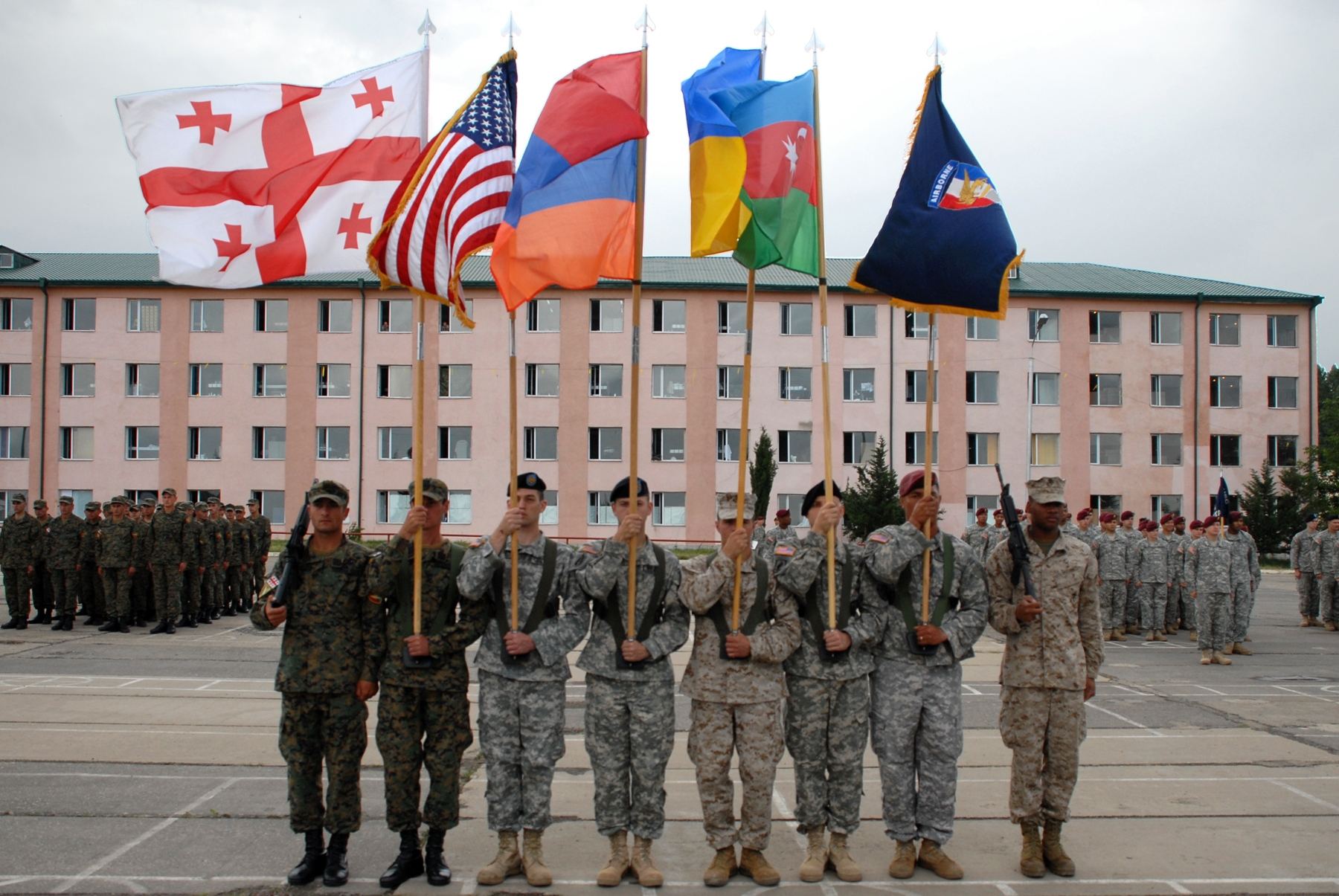
Georgian and international soldiers during the opening ceremony of Immediate Response 2008 at Vaziani Military Base, July 17, 2008

Also based at Vaziani is the 23rd Infantry Battalion, which operates as part of Georgia's rapid deployment forces. The battalion has participated in NATO-led and U.S.-led missions abroad, including deployments to Afghanistan and Iraq, and frequently serves as a core unit during multinational exercises hosted at the base.

In addition to its permanent garrison, Vaziani regularly hosts rotating training elements from the Georgian National Guard, specialized units of the Special Operations Forces, and logistics and engineering detachments.

== Capabilities ==
Vaziani Military Base functions as a central operational platform for Georgia's land warfare capabilities, with emphasis on combined arms maneuver, mechanized infantry operations, and multinational interoperability. As the home base of the 4th Mechanized Brigade, the installation supports combat-ready units equipped with infantry fighting vehicles, armored personnel carriers, artillery systems, and tactical support assets. These are integrated into the Georgian Land Forces’ doctrine of mobile, modular ground combat units capable of rapid deployment across Georgia's varied terrain.

In terms of infrastructure, Vaziani includes hardened vehicle depots, barracks, field command posts, maintenance zones, and live-fire training areas. The site is also connected logistically to the adjacent Vaziani Air Base, offering a secondary air mobility interface for the transportation of troops and equipment when needed. Though the airstrip remains largely underutilized, its proximity supports contingency operations involving rotary and fixed-wing aircraft.

U.S. Marine Corps combat engineers role-playing as opposing forces during counter‑IED training at Vaziani Military Base, March 23, 2013

The base has also supported peacekeeping training, with units stationed at Vaziani having deployed to missions under ISAF and Resolute Support in Afghanistan, as well as to coalition operations in Iraq and EU peacekeeping roles in Central Africa. Training cycles incorporate counter-IED awareness, urban combat, and humanitarian assistance logistics, in line with Georgia's international deployment commitments.

While not a strategic missile base or air defense node, Vaziani is equipped with standard-issue air defense systems for base protection, including man-portable air-defense systems (MANPADS) and short-range anti-air platforms, typically integrated into ground unit inventories. In 2020, the Georgian Defence Forces completed minor upgrades to command-and-control infrastructure at Vaziani to enhance situational awareness, communications resilience, and field coordination capacity, consistent with Georgia's NATO interoperability goals.

== Infrastructure ==
Vaziani Military Base spans an area of approximately 2–3 square kilometers on the southeastern outskirts of Tbilisi, near the village of Vaziani. The facility is located within Gardabani Municipality, on relatively flat, open terrain suitable for large-scale maneuver training and armored vehicle operations. The perimeter of the installation is secured by fencing, observation posts, and entry control points, with restricted access maintained by military police.

=== Facilities and Layout ===
The base includes a range of permanent structures, among them barracks, administrative buildings, vehicle hangars, and maintenance depots, constructed primarily of concrete and steel in the Soviet military style. Many of these structures were built during the base's original construction in the 1940s and later adapted or renovated by the Georgian Ministry of Defence after 2001.

Living quarters for enlisted personnel and officers are located in multi-level dormitory-style buildings, equipped with dining halls, training classrooms, and logistical support offices. Separate facilities serve as command and control centers, communications hubs, and logistics coordination points. A medical clinic and base support units are also maintained on-site for garrison health services.

U.S. Marines and Georgian soldiers playing soccer during Agile Spirit 13 training at Vaziani Military Base, March 17, 2013.

The base includes an expansive training area, with dedicated grounds for small-arms and heavy weapons live-fire exercises, obstacle courses, and vehicle maneuver ranges. These areas support unit-level and battalion-level training cycles, including NATO-standard drills conducted during multinational exercises. An indoor training complex, outfitted with simulation systems, supports weapons handling, tactical planning, and urban warfare exercises.

=== Utilities and Modernization ===
The base is connected to the national electrical grid and maintains back-up generators for operational continuity. Water supply is provided through local municipal infrastructure, supplemented by on-site storage and purification systems. Renovations completed since 2010 have improved communications infrastructure, command post facilities, and cybersecurity capacity, in line with interoperability benchmarks under NATO's Partnership for Peace framework.

Though there are no known extensive underground facilities akin to those found at hardened Cold War-era sites, Vaziani includes secure hardened shelters and armored vehicle bays built to withstand artillery strikes or limited aerial attack.
