= International Society for Fair Elections and Democracy =

- Established: 1995 (30 years ago)
- Types: non-governmental organization
- Aim: election monitoring
- Country: Georgia

International Society for Fair Elections and Democracy or ISFED is a Georgian election monitoring and democracy promoting non-governmental organization created in 1995.

== Creation and aims ==
ISFED was created in 1995. It describes its aims as election monitoring, voter education, electoral reform, and supporting democratic processes.

== Leadership and structure ==
As of January 2025, ISFED listed seven members of its Board, including chair Mikheil Kechaqmadze and secretary Nikoloz Simonishvili. ISFED states that its governing body is a General Assembly that meets annually and elected nine board members for a maximum three-year term, with annual renewal of a third of the members. The Board appoints ISFED's Executive Director.

== Actions ==
As of 2022, ISFED has used parallel vote tabulation (PVT) for 10 Georgian elections. As of 2024, it has monitored 26 elections.

ISFED monitored the 2018 Georgian presidential election. As part of its monitoring, it studied online social media, primarily Facebook, looking at patterns of violations of electoral law, attempts to discredit electoral processes, and "divisive value-based narratives". ISFED found significant evidence of disinformation campaigns. Facebook removed a disinformation network in response to a request from ISFED.

In 2020, with support from United States Agency for International Development (USAID), ISFED planned on monitoring electoral process before and after the 2020 Georgian parliamentary election. ISFED monitoring included 68 long-term election observers across Georgia, and planned for 1000 short-term observers and 70 mobile observer teams.

ISFED implemented PVT as a statistical check on the official results. ISFED's initially published PVT results erroneously included invalid ballots and stated that in 8% of polling stations, the total vote count was greater than the number of voter signatures. Georgian Dream (GD) requested ISFED to identify the suspicious polling stations. On 11 December 2020, ISFED published corrected PVT results. ISFED was criticised both by GD and by opposition groups.

In its social media monitoring of the 2021 Georgian local elections, ISFED found that the firehose of falsehood technique was used for disinformation. It interpreted the aim of the disinformation campaign as delegitimising objective criticism of the electoral administration and delegitimising ISFED and other citizens' electoral monitoring organisations.

Following the 2024 Georgian parliamentary election, ISFED stated that its PVT results were consistent with the Central Election Commission's preliminary official results. ISFED also stated that there were "severe violations observed throughout the pre-election period and on election day itself" including "reports of voter intimidation, confiscation of identification cards, improper collection and processing of personal data, and extensive voter bribery" prior to the election and "ballot stuffing, multiple voting, large-scale voter bribery, [and] expulsion of observers from polling stations" at the election itself. ISFED stated that because of the violations, which it described as a "fundamentally flawed" electoral environment, it would not publish the PVT results.

On 10 January 2025, during the 2024–2025 Georgian political crisis, ISFED described the firing of 50 civil servants as political persecution against the civil servants for their publicly stating their support for the accession of Georgia to the European Union and Article 78 of the Georgian constitution. ISFED stated that it would file a lawsuit on behalf of those dismissed. According to ISFED, a law adopted on 13 December 2024 made firing civil servants easier. Civil Georgia viewed the new law as incompatible with ILO Convention 158.

== Criticism by Georgian Dream ==
On 18 August 2022, GD excluded ISFED from a parliamentary working group on electoral issues, justifying the decision on the grounds of ISFED's "critical views". In response to the exclusion, four Georgian non-governmental organizations, the Institute for Development of Freedom of Information, Democracy Research Institute, Georgian Young Lawyers' Association, and Social Justice Center called for GD to restore ISFED's participation in the working group and stated that they would suspend their participation in all working groups created by GD.

Georgian Dream described ISFED as being "aligned with foreign interests".
