= Krassen Stanchev =

Bulgarian MP, economist and philosopher

Krassen Stanchev (Красен Станчев) is a Bulgarian economist and philosopher. MP at VII Constitutional Assembly of Bulgaria (1990–1991), chairman of its Commission for Environmental Protection and member of the Commission for Economic Policy. Founder and executive director of the Institute for Market Economics (IME), Bulgaria's first independent, free-market think thank (1993–2006), currently chairman of its management board.

Krassen Stanchev got his MA in philosophy from the St. Petersburg State University (1980) and his PhD from the Bulgarian Academy of Sciences (1988). He was assistant professor at the University for National and World Economy in Sofia (formerly Higher Economics Institute) till 1989.

As MP and as IME Director, he was a principle drafter and one of the leaders of reforms from central planning to market economy in Bulgaria, in particular tax reforms, contractual relations, investments and the improvement of the business climate. Member of the Economic Council of President Petar Stoyanov (1996–2001), coordinator of the Inter-ministerial group for the removal of administrative obstacles to business (2002–2003). Co-founder of Transparency International, Bulgaria, and of the Access to Information Programme whose board member he was from 1996 till February 2001. As of 2006, Stanchev worked on Southeast Europe (including pro-market and tax reforms in Bosnia and Herzegovina, and Montenegro), Central Asia (Kazakhstan, Kyrgyzstan and Tajikistan), Caucasus (Armenia, Azerbaijan and Georgia), Russia, Ukraine and Egypt, leading teams and/or being a subcontractor of EU, UN, USAID or the World Bank programs. He is also CEO of KC2 Ltd specialised in consulting services (as of 2009).

Stanchev currently is an associate professor at the Public Administration Department, Sofia University (as of 2012) where he teaches Public Choice, Macroeconomic Analysis of Politics, Public Sector Economics, Regulatory Analysis and History of economic ideas. Author and co-author of six books, editor of a dozen collective volumes, published about 100 scholarly studies and articles. Columnist of Free Europe Bulgaria (2022-March 2025).

Krassen is a member of Mont Pelerin Society, of the Network for Constitutional Economics and Social Philosophy (NOUS), of the Wilhelm Röpke Institut in Erfurt, and Honorary Board Member of the Bulgarian Chamber of Commerce and Industry. Distinguished Professor of Tbilisi Free University.

He is a recipient of the Best Country Analyst award by EuroMoney (1996) and a nominee for Bulgaria's Mr. Ekonomika 2004, as well as laureate of Bulgaria Government Prize for Overall Contribution to Democracy and Reforms (2002), and the Georgy Vassilev Fund Award for Contribution to the Spirit of Liberty (2006).

Some publications by Krassen Stanchev:

- От логика към история [From Logic to History] Sofia: St Kliment Ohridski University Press 1990
- Анатомия на прехода. Стопанската политика на България от 1989 до 2004 [Anatomy of the Transition: The Economic Policy of Bulgaria from 1989 to 2004]. Co-authored with: Asenka Hristova, Vladislav Slanchev, Georgi Angelov, Georgi Stoev, Dimiter Chobanov, Lachezar Bogdanov, Martin Dimitrov. Sofia: Ciela 2004.
- 'Economic perspectives on organised crime', Southeast European and Black Sea Studies vol. 4 (2): 241-249, 2004
- ‘Generation 1968: The Road to Prosperity and EU Accession’. Review# 20: 20 Years in the EU: CEE and its Path to Progress. https://4liberty.eu/category/review/review-20/.
