= Institute for Development of Freedom of Information =

Non-governmental organization in Georgia

- Established: 2009 (16 years ago)
- Types: non-governmental organization
- Aim: democracy
- Country: Georgia

The Institute for Development of Freedom of Information or IDFI is a Georgian non-governmental organization that describes its aims as promoting democracy.

== Creation and aims ==
The Institute for Development of Freedom of Information was created in 2009.

== Actions ==
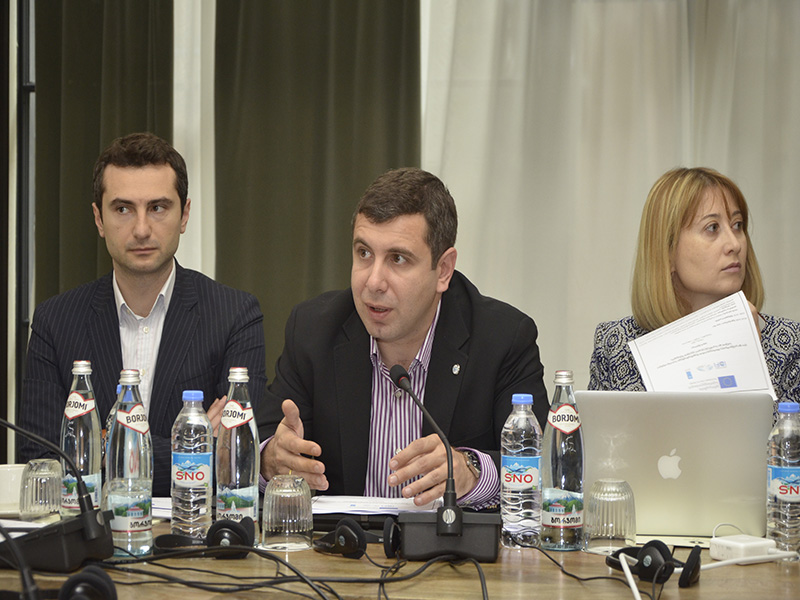
IDFI members at 2017–2018 meeting on Parliamentary Openness Action Plan

In August 2022, IDFI was one of the four Georgian NGOs that objected to Georgian Dream (GD) excluding the International Society for Fair Elections and Democracy from a parliamentary working group on electoral issues.
