= List of roads in Georgia (country) =

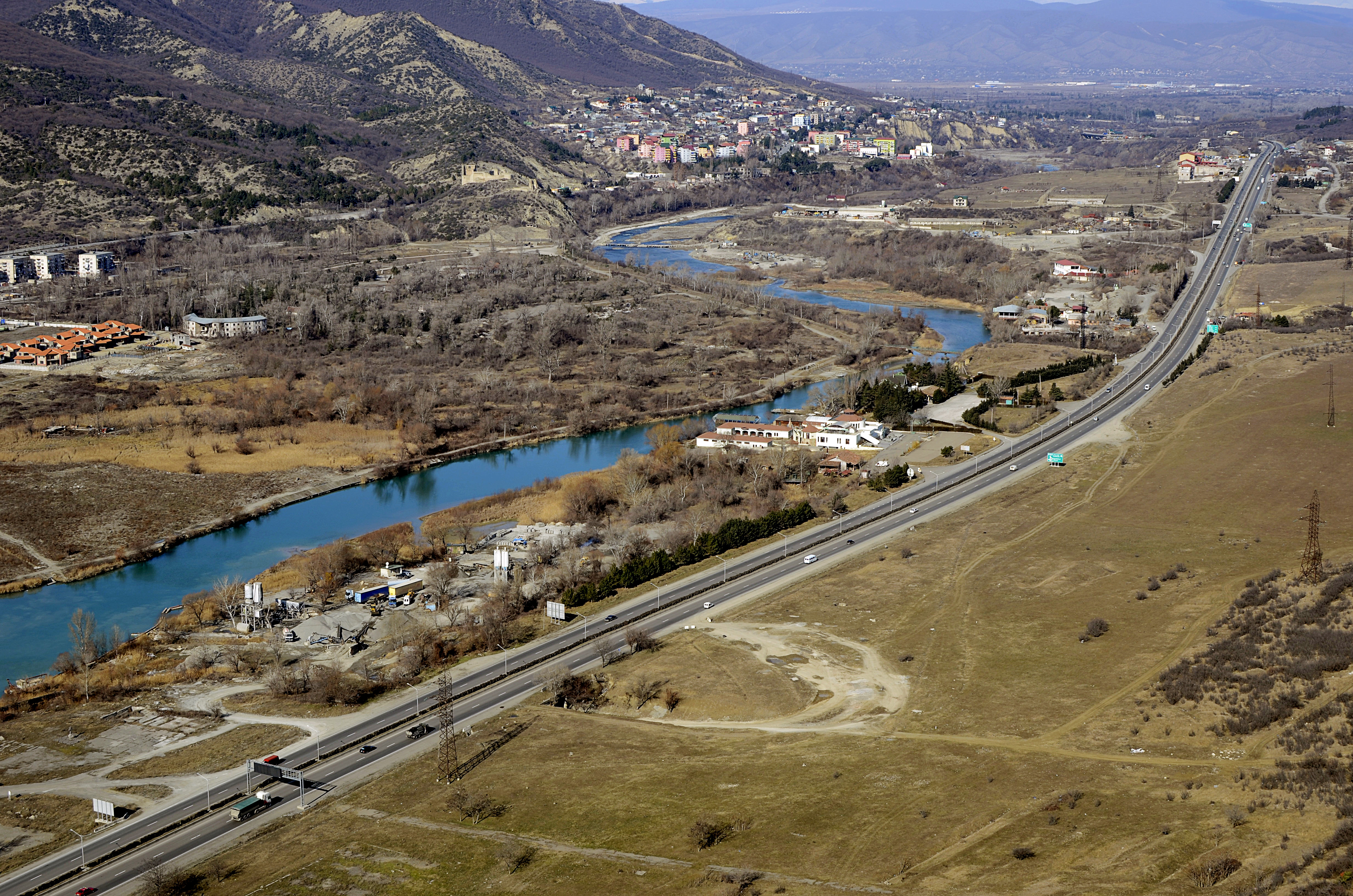
Georgia has about 200 km motorway or expressway

The trunk roads in Georgia are a network of internationally oriented highways, which connect the Georgian capital of Tbilisi, home to roughly a third of the national population, with neighbouring countries and the domestic regions. This is the backbone for a network of domestic trunk roads connecting vital regions with each other and the capital. The total length of the road network in Georgia is 21,100 kilometres (13,100 mi) in 2021. The roads of so-called "international importance" and "national importance" are managed by the Roads Department (Georoad) of the Ministry of Regional Development and Infrastructure of Georgia.

== Roads of international importance ==
Roads of "international importance" in Georgia

European and Asian highways through Georgia

The "roads of international importance" are the highest category of roads in Georgia. They are denoted by the prefix ს (Georgian for S), which stands for "საერთაშორისო მნიშვნელობის გზა" (Saertashoriso mnishvnelobis gza, road of international importance). Direction and destination signs in Georgia are in both Georgian and Latin scripts, but the prefix is only displayed in Georgian. Article 3.3 of the law on motor roads defines that:

- roads of international importance include roads connecting the administrative, important industrial and cultural centers of Georgia and other countries.

The network of S trunk roads has a total length of approximately 1,600 kilometres (990 mi) which is mostly built as two-lane highway. About 200 kilometres (120 mi) kilometers of the central east-west S1 and a limited section of the S12 has been upgraded to expressway or motorway with two lanes in each direction. The S4 and S5 trunk routes also have multiple lanes over a limited length.

The S1 and S10 are partially located in South Ossetia and Abkhazia regions, over which the Georgian government exercises no authority. At the de facto boundary lines the roads are closed in both directions.

Number	E Route	AH Route	Name	Length (km)	Notes
ს 1	European route E60 European route E97 European route E117	AH5 AH81 AH82	Tbilisi - Senaki - Leselidze	542.7	Tbilisi - Surami and Argveta - Samtredia have been (re)built as motorway (170 km). Surami - Argveta via Rikoti Pass is under construction as motorway (58 km).
ს 2	European route E60 European route E70	AH5	Senaki - Poti - Sarpi	119.5	S2 upgrade is ongoing: the 32 km Kobuleti Bypass has been rebuilt as super-two with 90 km/h speed limit, as will be the 14 km Batumi Bypass. Kobuleti to Grigoleti (S12) is under construction as motorway (14 km).
ს 3	European route E117	AH81	Mtskheta - Stepantsminda - Larsi	139.0	Also called Georgian Military Road. In 2021 construction started of the 23 km Khveseti - Kobi section to bypass Gudauri and the Jvari Pass with a 2+1 road and a 9 km two-lane tunnel, the longest in the Caucasus.
ს 4	European route E60 European route E117	AH5 AH81	Tbilisi - Red Bridge	57.0	Rustavi - Red Bridge will be rerouted as 32 km motorway, including a new motorway section linking the S4 with the S7 to Armenia. The EU will provide financial support.
ს 5			Tbilisi – Bakurtsikhe – Lagodekhi	160.0	Tbilisi (S9) - Sagarejo (35 km) will be constructed as motorway.
ს 6	European route E117	AH81	Ponichala – Marneuli – Guguti	98.0	
ს 7	European route E001	AH81	Marneuli – Sadakhlo	34.0	Rebuilding 16 km of the S7 to motorway plus 14 km new motorway to connect with S4 to Rustavi is in preparation.
ს 8	European route E691	AH5	Khashuri – Akhaltsikhe – Vale	97.0	
ს 9	European route E60 European route E117	AH5 AH81	Tbilisi Bypass	49.0	
ს 10			Gori – Tskhinvali – Gupta – Java – Roki	92.5	
ს 11	European route E691	AH82	Akhaltsikhe – Ninotsminda	112.0	
ს 12	European route E692		Samtredia - Lanchkhuti - Grigoleti	56.2	The entire S12 is under construction as new motorway. In July 2020 Japana-Lanchkhuti (14 km) opened. Three other sections experience delays (see S12 page).
ს 13			Akhalkalaki - Kartsakhi	36.5	
Total:				1593.4	Based on the 2022 published list of roads by the Government of Georgia.

== Roads of domestic importance ==
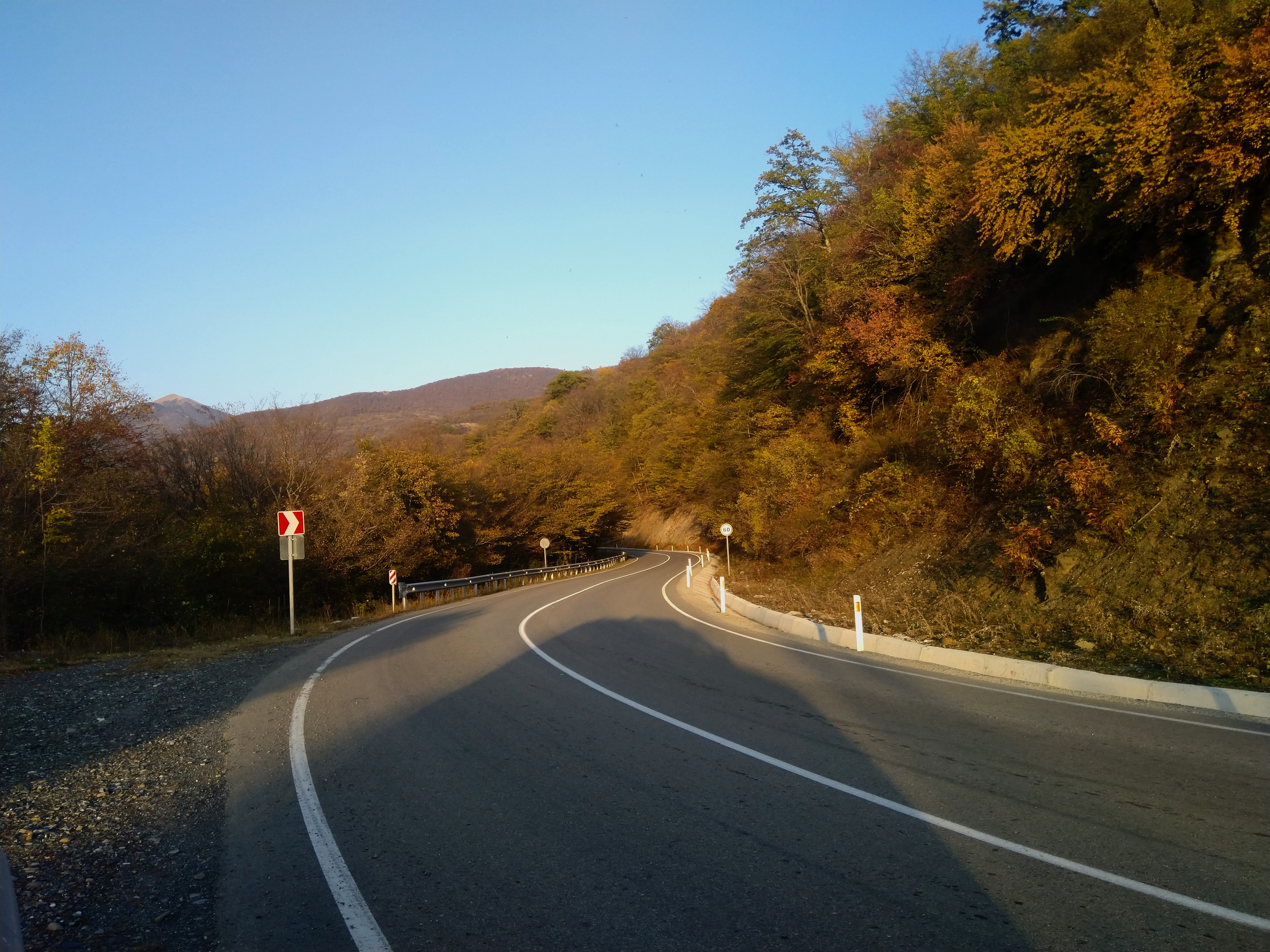
Renovated Sh26 Zhinvali - Shatili

The "roads of domestic importance" are the second category of main roads in Georgia with a total length of 5,460 km (3,390 mi) and connect vital economic, administrative and cultural centers. They are denoted by the prefix შ (Georgian for Sh), which stands for "შიდასახელმწიფოებრივი მნიშვნელობის გზა" (Shidasakhelmts’ipoebrivi mnishvnelobis gza, "road of domestic importance"). The use of the road numbers on direction signs is inconsistent and varies widely, including on trunk Sh roads. The vast majority of routes is relatively short, but some are up to nearly 200 km (120 mi) long with an interregional function. Article 3.4 of the law on motor roads defines roads of domestic importance as:

- roads connecting with important industrial and cultural centers of the capital of Georgia, administrative centers of the Autonomous Republics and administrative centers of the municipality, as well as their bypasses and access to them from highways of international and domestic importance;
- roads connecting the administrative centers of the Autonomous Republics, the administrative centers of the municipalities, the important industrial and cultural centers of Georgia;
- roads connecting airports and ports with the capital of Georgia, administrative centers of autonomous republics and municipalities.

The quality of Sh-roads varies from excellent to very poor. Since 2006 however, priority has been given to improve regional connections, which has accelerated from 2014 onwards. The quality of the regional road network improves over the years, but large parts remain in mediocre, poor and/or unpaved condition and suffer from harsh climatic conditions, especially in the mountainous areas. The infamous "road to Omalo" (Sh44) to Tusheti National Park is the most extreme example of that.

=== 1-50 ===
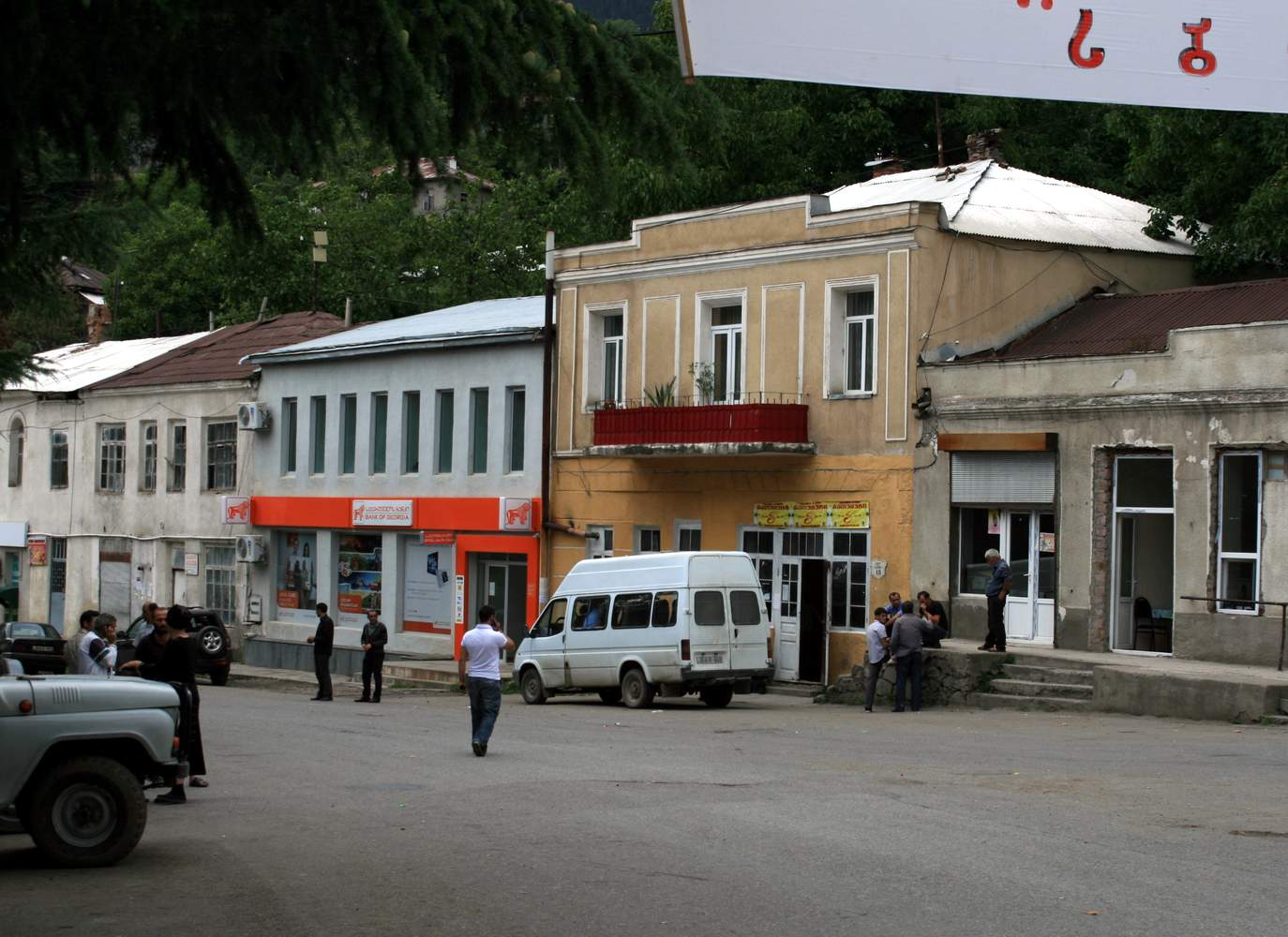
შ 1 route in Khulo

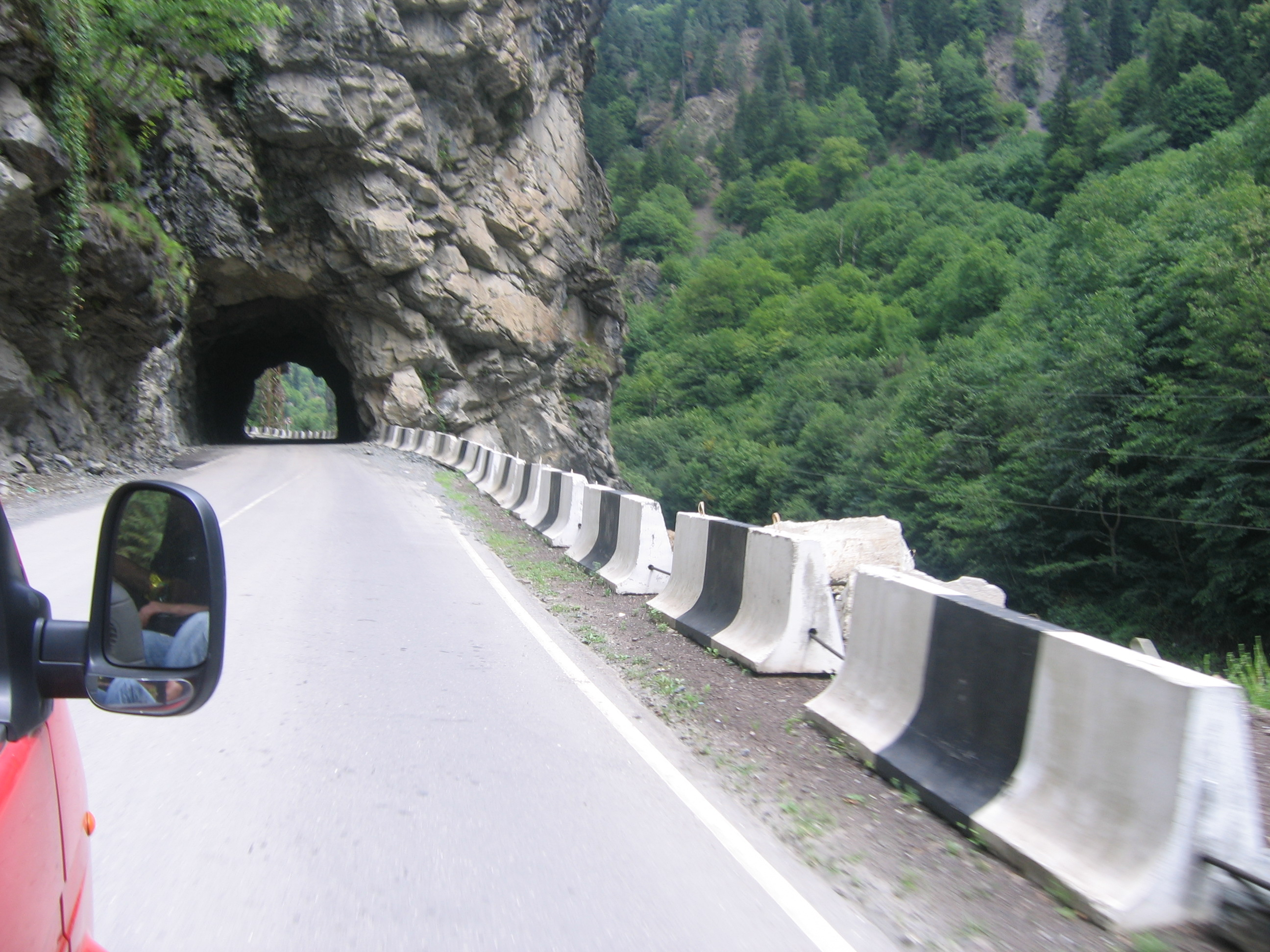
შ 7 route in Svaneti

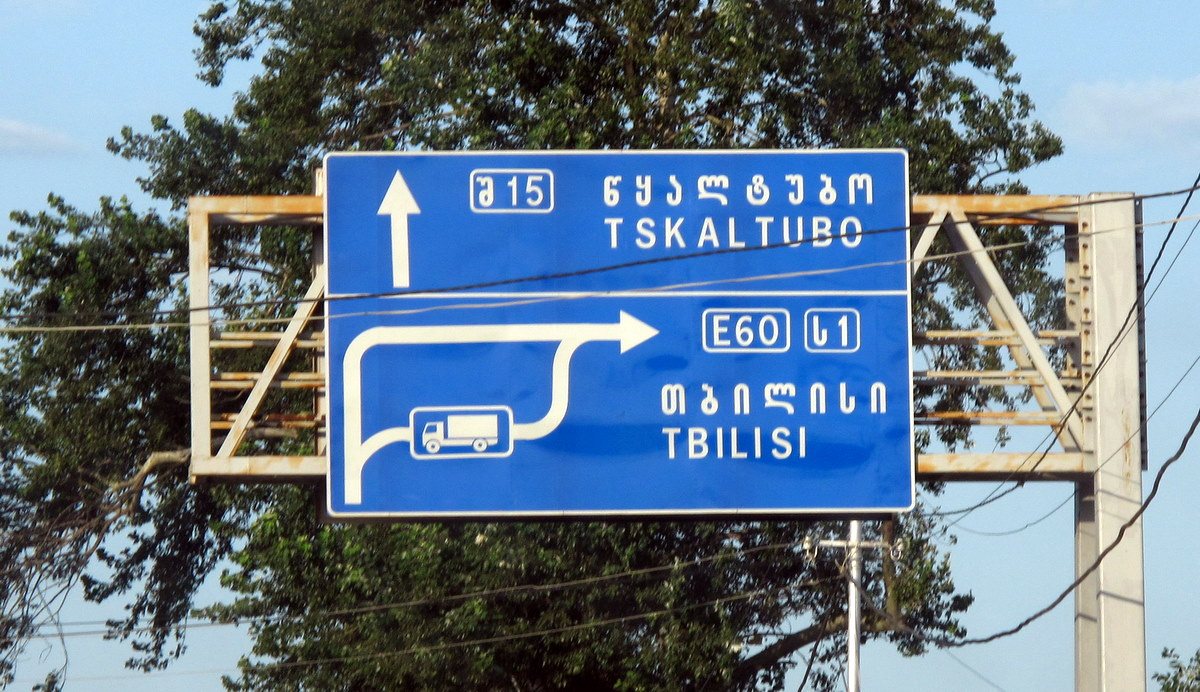
შ 15 road sign in Kutaisi

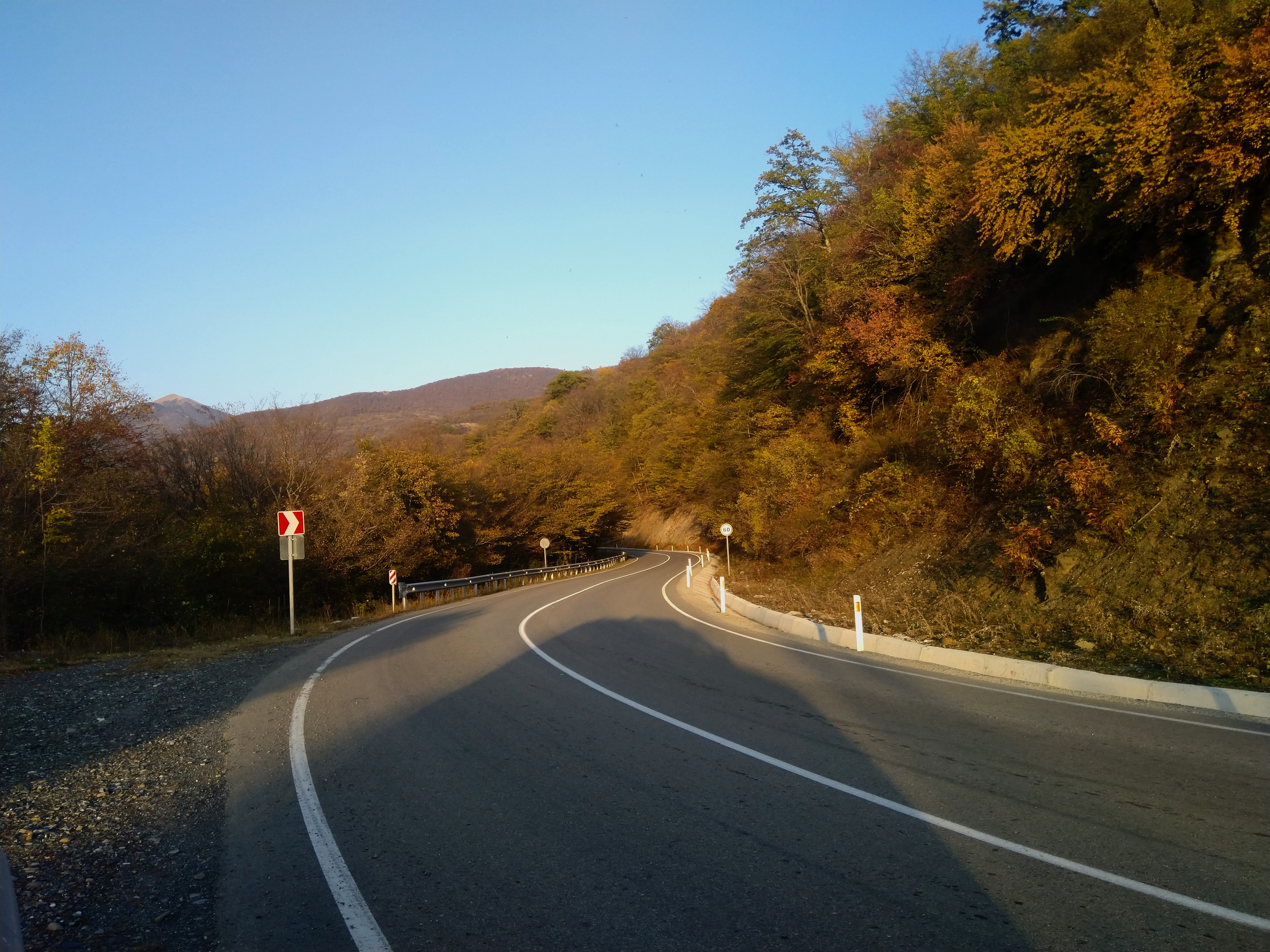
შ 26 at Zhinvali Reservoir

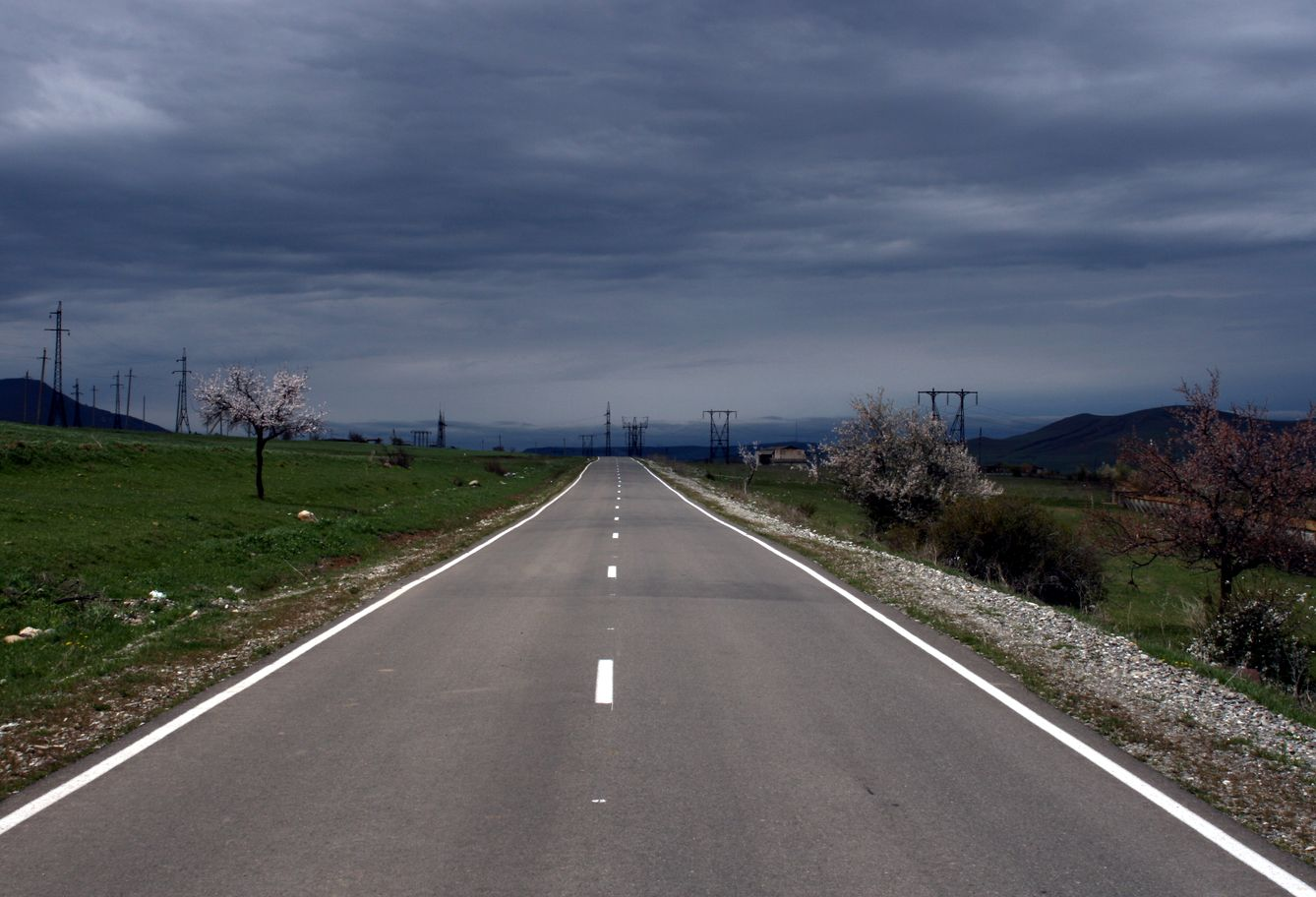
შ 29 route near Gori

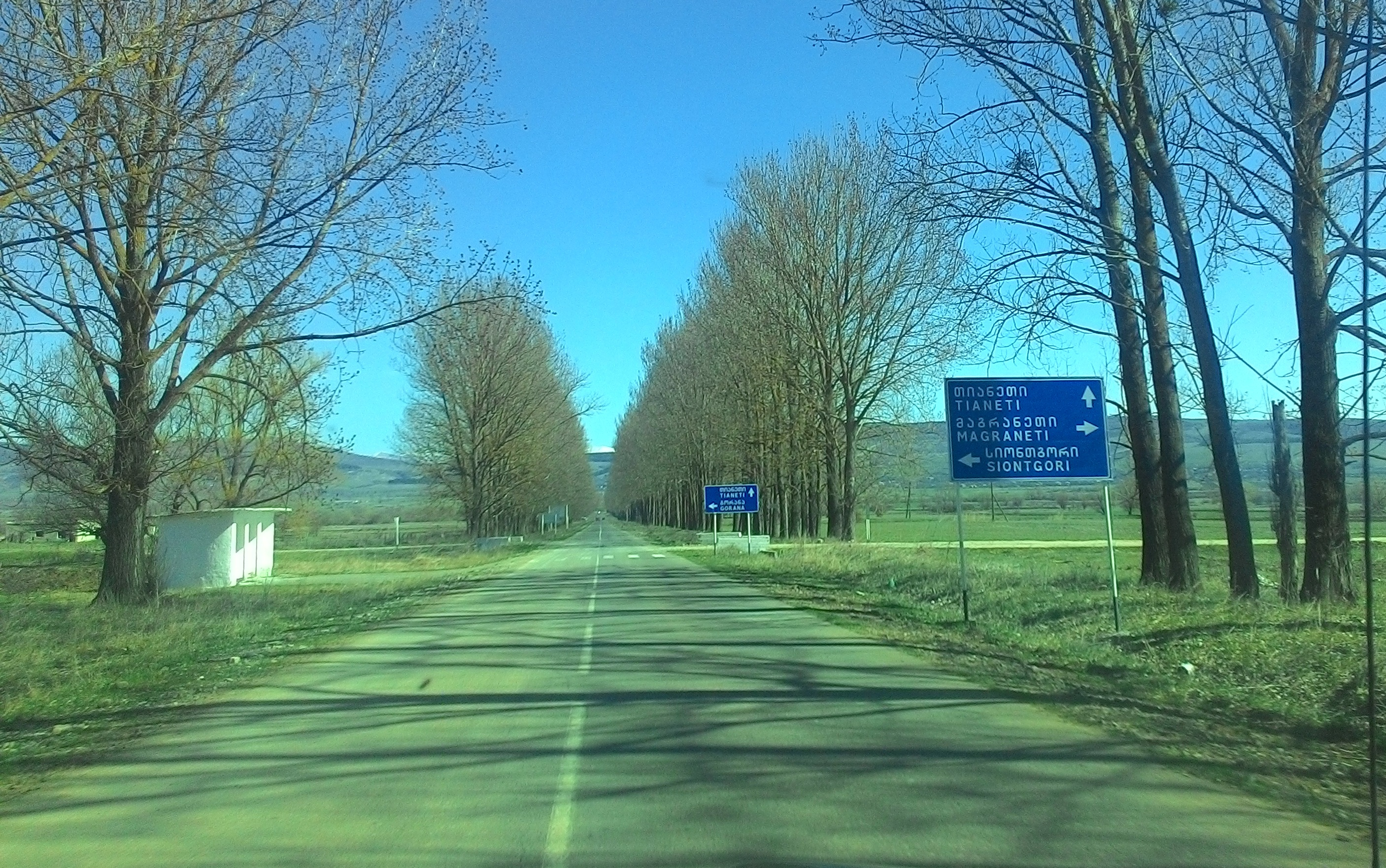
შ 30 route to Tianeti

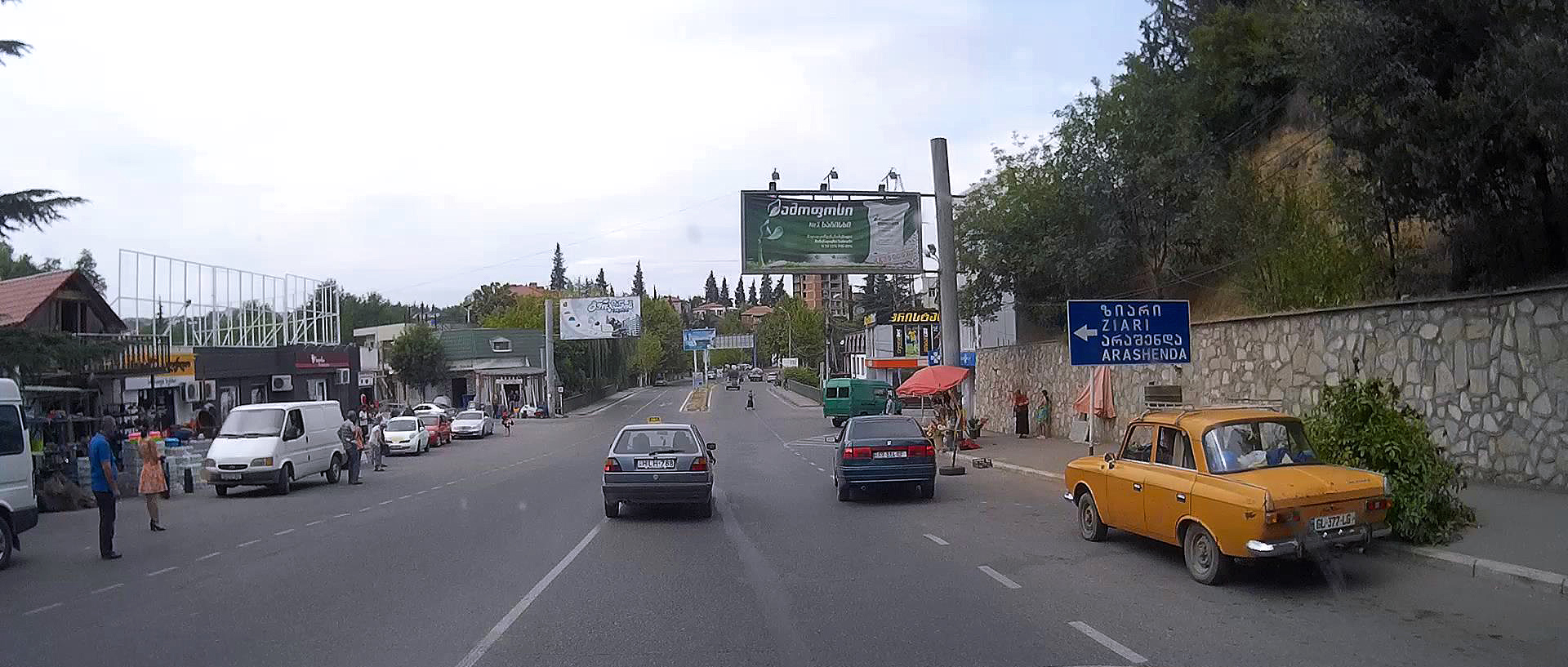
შ 42 through Gurjaani

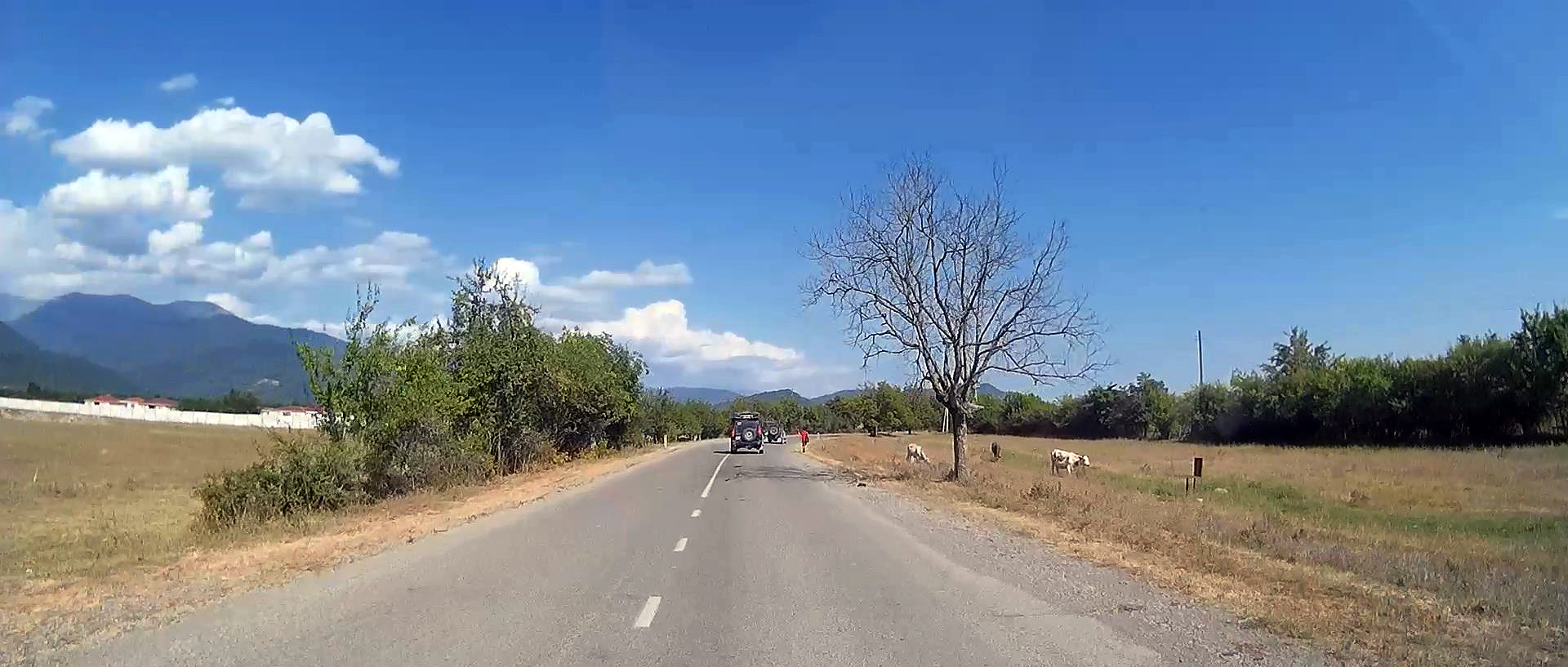
შ 43 Pshaveli to Napareuli

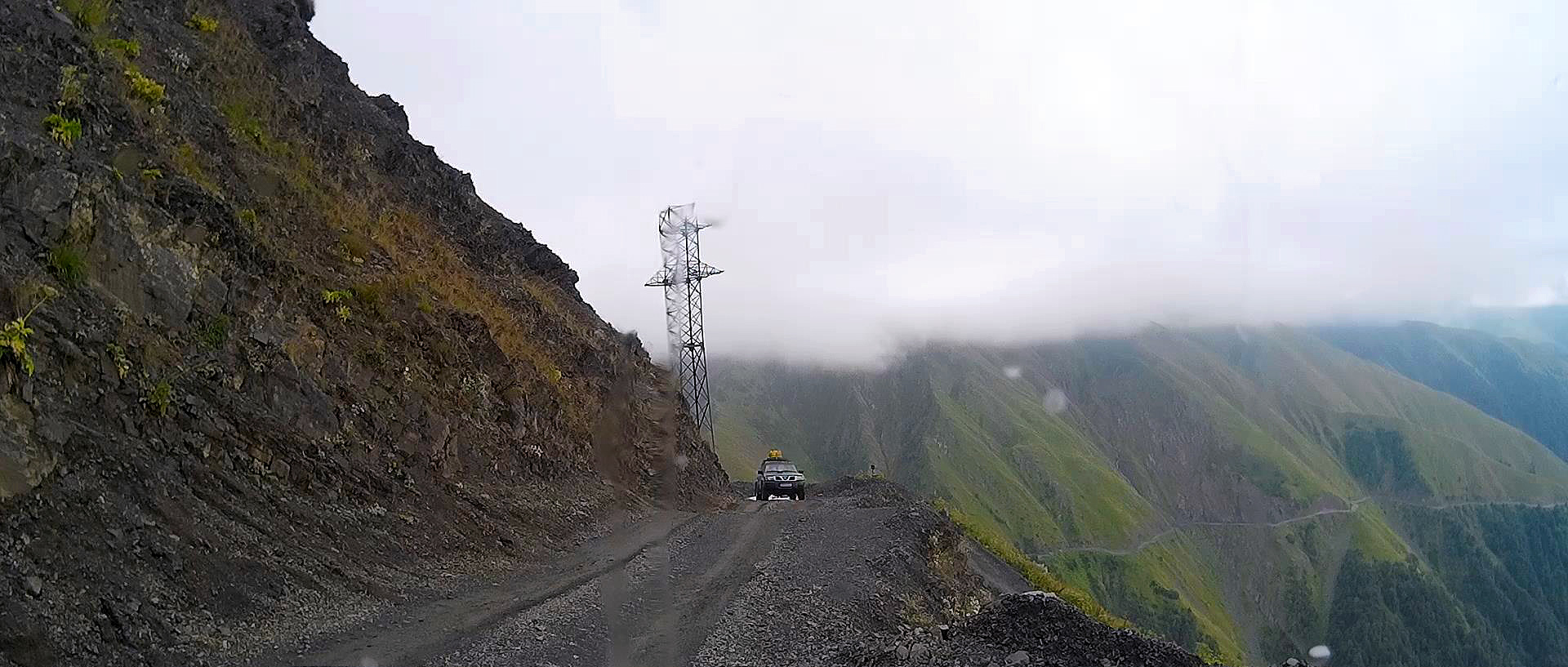
შ 44 road in Tusheti NP

Number	Name (route)	Length
შ 1	Batumi (Angisa) - Akhaltsikhe	159 km
შ 2	Sajavakho - Chokhatauri - Ozurgeti - Kobuleti	73.4 km
შ 3	Abasha - Gaghma Kodori - Guleiskari - Japana	33 km
შ 4	Abasha – Martvili	34.5 km
შ 5	Senaki – Nokalakevi – Bandza – Khoni	36.9 km
შ 6	Zugdidi – Tsalenjikha – Chkhorotsqu – Senaki	86 km
შ 7	Zugdidi – Jvari – Mestia – Lasdili	193 km
შ 8	Zugdidi – Anaklia	34 km
შ 9	Ochamchire – Tkvarcheli	27.2 km
შ 10	Machara – Samkhret Tavshesapari	101 km
შ 11	Bzipi – Lake Ritsa – Avadhara	60 km
შ 12	Kutaisi (Autofactory) – Khoni – Samtredia	40 km
შ 13	Baghdati – Vani – Dapnari	47.8 km
შ 14	Kutaisi (Saghoria) – Baghdati – Abastumani - Benara	102.2 km
შ 15	Kutaisi (Tsqaltubo turn) – Tsqaltubo - Tsageri - Lentekhi - Lasdili	151 km
შ 16	Kutaisi (Choma) – Alpana - Mamison Pass (Russian Border)	161 km
შ 17	Kutaisi (Motsameta) – Tkibuli - Ambrolauri	73.5 km
შ 18	Alpana – Tsageri	22.8 km
შ 19	Cholaburi Bridge – Terjola - Tkibuli	29 km
შ 20	Borjomi - Bakuriani - Akhalkalaki	82 km
შ 21	Akhalkalaki Bypass road	2.4 km
შ 22	Gomi – Sachkhere - Chiatura - Zestaponi	106 km
შ 23	Agara – Kornisi - Tskhinvali	49.6 km
შ 24	Gori – Variani - Tskhinvali	25.7 km
შ 25	Gupta – Oni	64.2 km
Number	Name (route)	Length (km)
შ 26	Zhinvali - Barisakho - Shatili	106 km
შ 27	Tianeti - Zaridzeebi - Zhinvali	21.5 km
შ 28	Tsikhisdsiri - Akhalgori - Largvisi	45 km
შ 29	Zahesi - Mtskheta - Kavtiskhevi - Gori - Skra - Kareli - Osiauri	109.5 km
შ 30	Tbilisi (Gldani) – Tianeti	60 km
შ 31	Koda - Partskhisi - Manglisi - Tsalka - Ninotsminda	147 km
შ 32	Tbilisi (Veli) - Gachiani - Rustavi	11 km
შ 33	Marneuli - Tetritskaro - Tsalka	88.7 km
შ 34	Partskhisi - Tetritskaro	6.5 km
შ 35	Tetritskaro - Dagheti - Topani - Bolnisi	19 km
შ 36	Tbilisi (Pantiani) – Manglisi	32 km
შ 37	Sadakhlo - Tsopi - Akhkerpi (Armenian Border, Highway H34)	26.2 km
შ 38	Vaziani - Gombori - Telavi	65 km
შ 39	Tsnori - Dedoplistsqaro – Kvemo Kedi	73 km
შ 40	Chalaubani – Sighnaghi - Anaga	21.8 km
შ 41	Iliatsminda - Bodbe - Gamarjveba	21.4 km
შ 42	Akhmeta – Telavi - Bakurtsikhe	73 km
შ 43	Tianeti – Akhmeta - Kvareli - Ninigori	129.4 km
შ 44	Pshaveli - Abano - Omalo	72 km
შ 45	Ozurgeti - Shemokmedi - Bzhuzhhesi - Gomismta	32.6 km
შ 46	Ozurgeti - Natanebi - Ureki	22 km
შ 47	Shukhuti - Atsana - Mamati - Dzimiti	17.5 km
შ 48	Chaladidi - Khorga - Khobi	15.4 km
შ 49	Bzipi – Pitsunda	12.4 km
შ 50	Miusera road	13.5 km

=== 51-100 ===
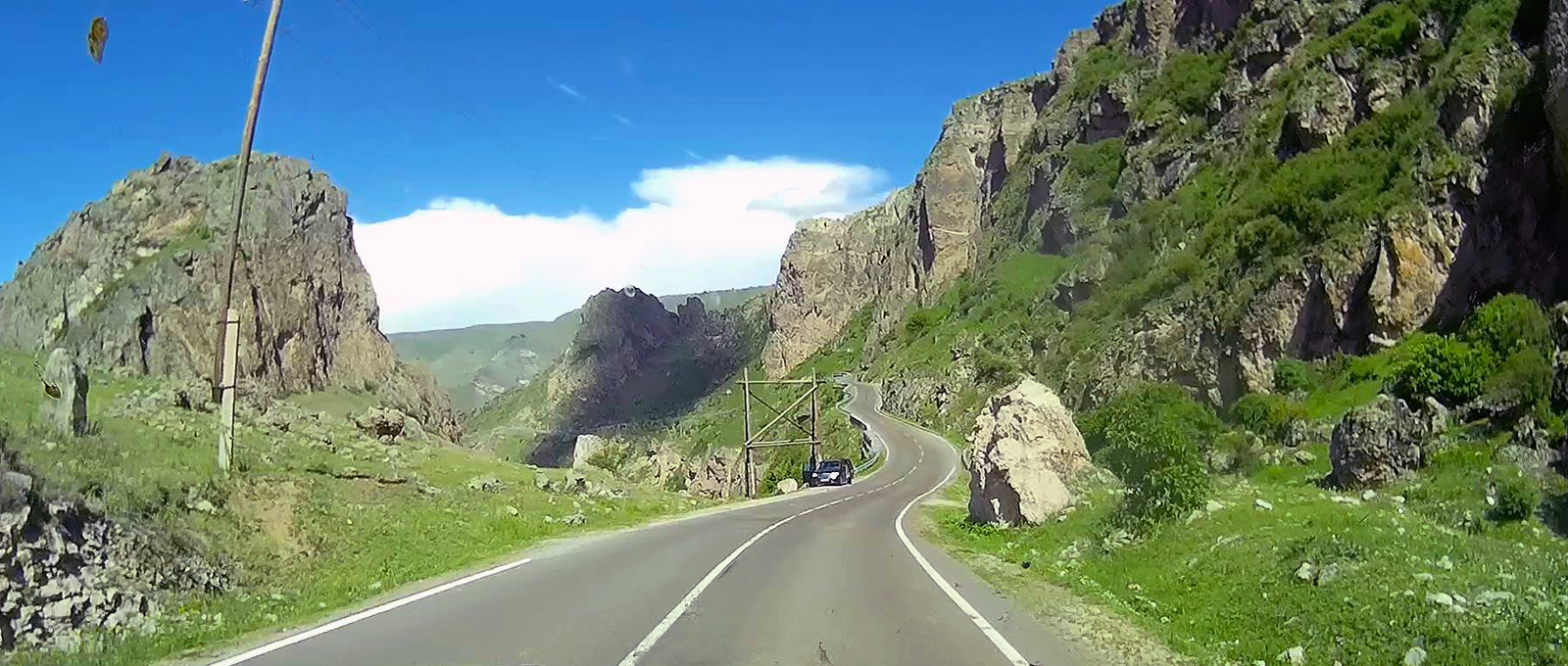
შ 58 Vardzia to Tmogvi

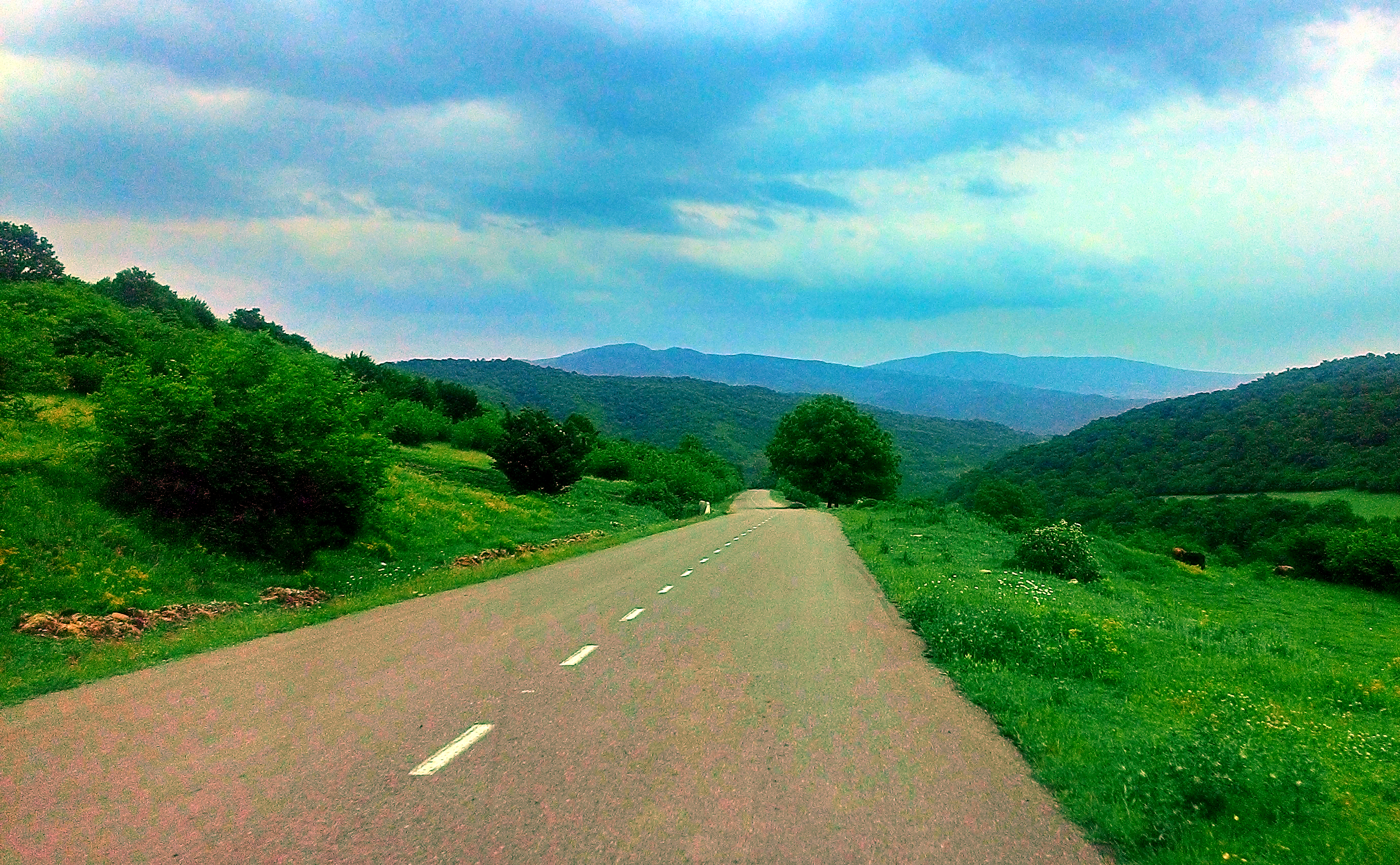
შ 65 near Bazaleti Lake

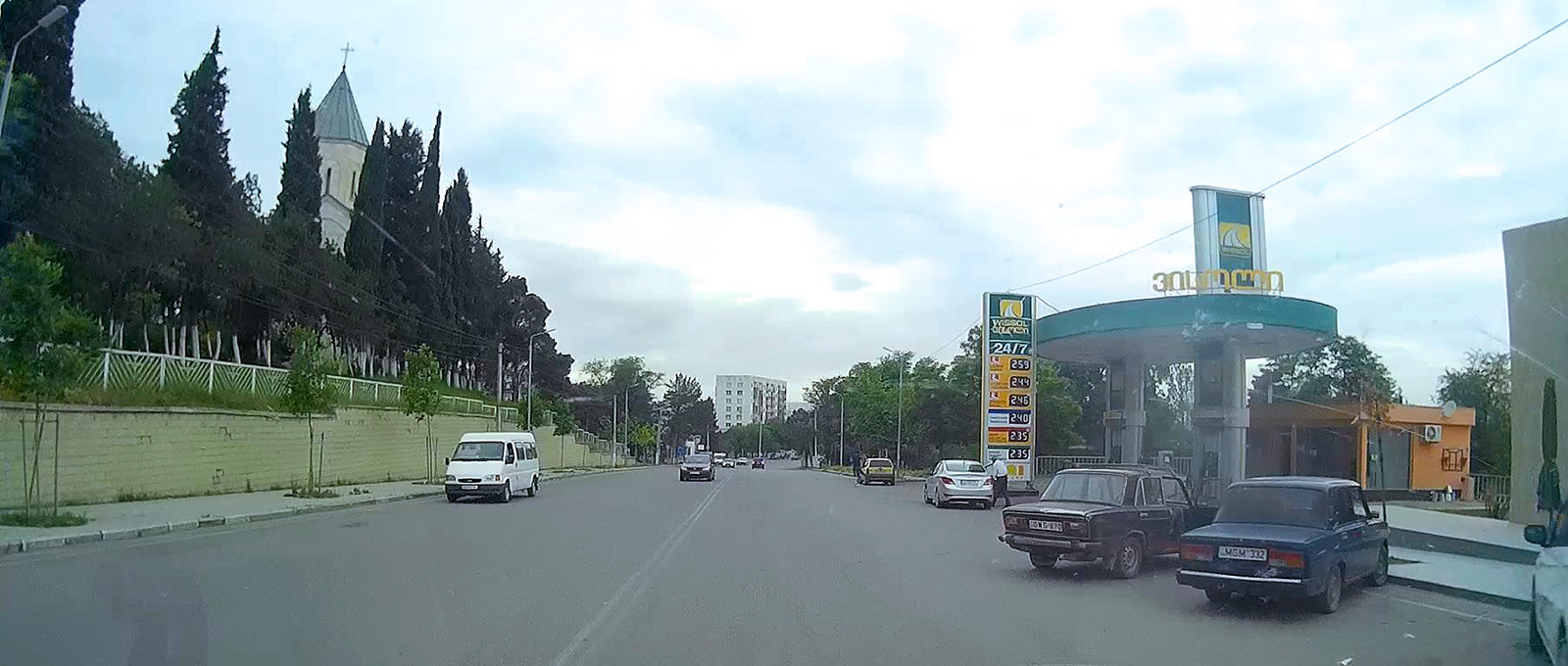
შ 66 through Gardabani

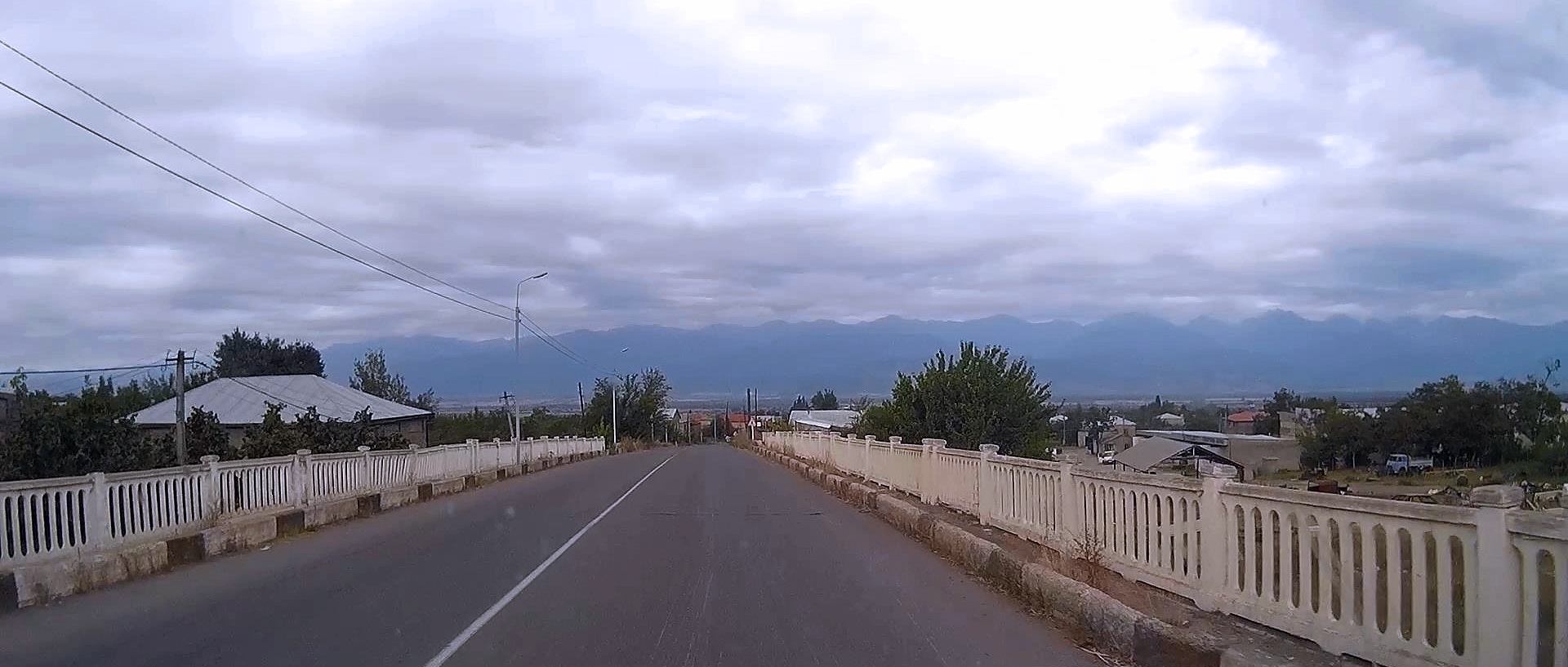
შ 70 through Telavi

Number	Name (route)	Length (km)
შ 51	Vartsikhe - Rokhi	7.2 km
შ 52	Tsqaltubo - Khoni	15 km
შ 53	Khoni - Matkhoji - Martvili	15 km
შ 54	Zestaponi - Baghdati	18.5 km
შ 55	Dzirula - Kharagauli - Moliti - Phona - Chumateleti	51 km
შ 56	Rikoti Tunnel Bypass	4.3 km
შ 57	Abastumani - Kanobili	5 km
შ 58	Khertvisi - Vardzia - Mtkvari (Turkish border)	22.6 km
შ 59	Kareli accessroad	3.3 km
შ 60	Sveneti - Gori accessroad	2.1 km
შ 61	Kaspi - Kavtiskhevi	10.8 km
შ 62	Igoeti - Akhmaji	12 km
შ 63	Igoeti - Kaspi - Akhalkalaki	20.5 km
შ 64	Narekvavi - Mtskheta Railway Station	6.2 km
შ 65	Bagischala - Dusheti - Aragvispiri	19.3 km
შ 66	Rustavi - Gardabani - Vakhtangisi (Azerbaijan Border, Highway R24)	24.5 km
შ 67	Gamarjveba - Rustavi	7.1 km
შ 68	Didi Dmanisi - Dmanisi - Gomareti - Bediani	70.2 km
შ 69	Kvareli - Mukuzani	17 km
შ 70	Telavi - Shakriani	11.4 km
შ 71	Bakuriani Circular Path	3 km
შ 72	Tirdznisi - Ditsi - Eredvi - Kheiti	18.8 km
შ 73	Toegangsweg Poti Sea Port (Via Khobi and Javakhishvili streets)	4.8 km
შ 74	Motsameta Monastery Accessroad	1.5 km
შ 75	Bakuriani Didveli Ski complex Accessroad	2.6 km
Number	Name (route)	Length (km)
შ 76	Goderdzi Pass - Beshumi	10 km
შ 77	Salkhino - Dadiani Palace Accessroad	6.7 km
შ 78	Hatsvali Ski complex Accessroad	6 km
შ 79	Prometheus Cave Accessroad	2.2 km
შ 80	Natanebi - Choloki Bridge	8.1 km
შ 81	Chokhatauri - Bakhmaro	53 km
შ 82	Ozurgeti - Ninoshvili - Lesa	24.8 km
შ 83	Chokhatauri - Zomleti	15 km
შ 84	Zugdidi - Jikhashkari - Chkhorotsqu	26 km
შ 85	Martvili - Taleri - Chkhorotsqu	41 km
შ 86	Nokalakevi - Ledzadzame - Didi Chkoni	23.5 km
შ 87	Khobi - Sajijao - Lesichine	29.2 km
შ 88	Zugdidi - Narazeni - Dzveli Khibula - Akhali khibula - Zubi	23.8 km
შ 89	Tsalenjikha - Obuji - Jikhashkari	14.2 km
შ 90	Darcheli - Ganmukhuri	12.6 km
შ 91	Taleri - Lebarde	34 km
შ 92	Martvili - Martvili Monastery	1.3 km
შ 93	Nosiri - Gejeti - Nokalakevi	16.5 km
შ 94	Tsalenjikha - Jvari - Jvarzeni	13.5 km
შ 95	Tsalenjikha - Lia - Pakhulani	10.5 km
შ 96	Tsalenjikha - Tsalenjikha Cathedral	1 km
შ 97	Shua Khorga - Kulevi	15.4 km
შ 98	Khobi - Akhalsopeli - Railway Platform	10.8 km
შ 99	Becho - Shikhra	9.1 km
შ 100	Khaishi - Sakeni - Omarishara	58 km

=== 101-150 ===
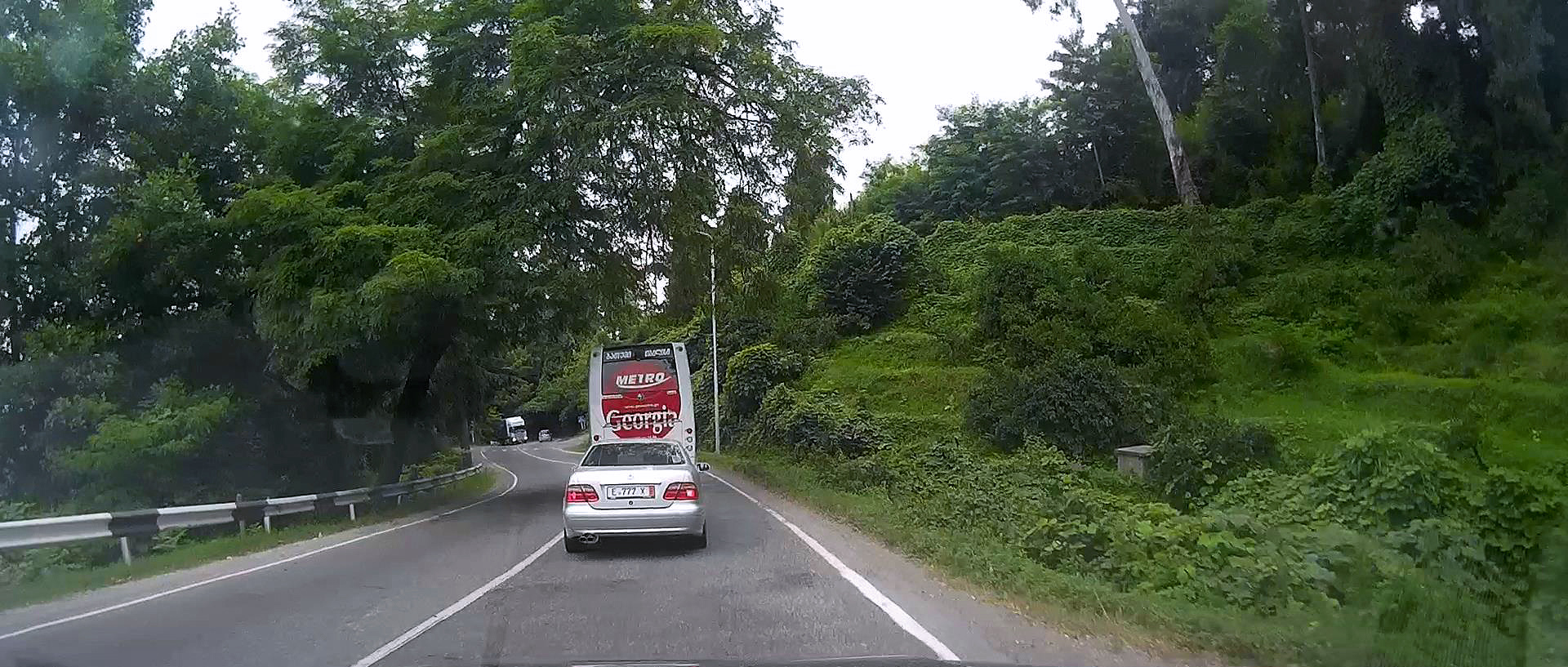
შ 130 at Tsikhisdziri

Number	Name (route)	Length (km)
შ 101	Zestaponi - Kitskhi - Kharagauli	20.8 km
შ 102	Rufoti - Alisubani - Sazano - Tuzi - Kvatsikhe - Katskhi	28.4 km
შ 103	Ianeti - Didi Jikhaishi - Khoni	17.1 km
შ 104	Kutaisi - Geguti - Sakulia - Bashi - Ianeti	34 km
შ 105	Vani - Sulori	11.5 km
შ 106	Shuamta - Chkvishi (G. Tabidze's House-Museum)	4.6 km
შ 107	Vani - Gaghma Vani (archaeological center)	2 km
შ 108	Kutaisi - Sapishkhia - Chognari	4.7 km
შ 109	Tkibuli - Sochkheti - Orpiri	24.2 km
შ 110	Gelati Monastery complex accessroad	2.6 km
შ 111	Banoja - Sataplia	6.1 km
შ 112	Tskaltubo - Partskhanakanevi	11.3 km
შ 113	Giorgi Tsereteli Museum accessroad	1.1 km
შ 114	Chiatura - Perevisa - Sveri - Tvalueti - Gezruli	32 km
შ 115	Shukruti - Usakhelo - Korbouli	19.2 km
შ 116	Matkhoji – Khidi - Gordi - Kinchkha	18.6 km
შ 117	Satsulukidzeo - Akhalbediseuli - Dzedzileti - Gelaveri	20 km
შ 118	Gordi - Nogha - Dzedzileti	5.6 km
შ 119	Chrebalo - Nikortsminda	25.1 km
შ 120	Tsesi - Uravi	14.3 km
შ 121	Saglolo – Chiora – Ghebi	11 km
შ 122	Lentekhi – Bavari	24 km
შ 123	Tsana – Zeskho	7 km
შ 124	Adigeni – Ude – Arali	16 km
შ 125	Akhaltsikhe – Ghreli – Sapara Monastery	9 km
Number	Name (route)	Length (km)
შ 126	Akhalkalaki - Kirovakani - Kumurdo	10.1 km
შ 127	Borjomi - Lake Baghi - Tsemi	12.3 km
შ 128	Tsaghveri - Kimotesubani Church	4 km
შ 129	Akhalkalaki – Rkoni	21.9 km
შ 130	Shekvetili Kobuleti - Chakvi – Makhinjauri (Tunnel Bypass)	32.6 km
შ 131	Tsinarekhi - Kvatakhevi Monastery	9.6 km
შ 132	Metekhi - Kvemo Gomi - Church of St John the Baptist	9.1 km
შ 133	Igoeti - Samtavisi - Kvemo Chala	4.2 km
შ 134	Kareli – Kintsvisi Monastery	8.9 km
შ 135	Ruisi Monastery accessroad	1 km
შ 136	Urbnisi Monastery accessroad	1.1 km
შ 137	Khidistavi – Ateni - Boshuri	28.4 km
შ 138	Gori – Mejvrishevi	17 km
შ 139	Uplistsikhe complex accessroad	6.7 km
შ 140	Tskhinvali – Vanati - Zonkari - Atsrishevi	28 km
შ 141	Vanati - Geri Church	12 km
შ 142	Sasadilo - Orkhevi - Khevsurtsopeli	27 km
შ 143	Dusheti - Mchadijvari - Odzisi	17.9 km
შ 144	Zarzma monastery accessroad	0.8 km
შ 145	Chargali (Vazha Pshavela House-Museum) accessroad	3.1 km
შ 146	Stepantsminda – Gergeti Trinity Church	5.7 km
შ 147	Achkhoti - Sno – Akhaltsikhe - Juta	20 km
შ 148	Orkhevi – Sioni	3.7 km
შ 149	Tsitsamuri – Saguramo - Tskhvarichamia	20.8 km
შ 150	Mtskheta – Shiomghvime Monastery	11.4 km

=== 151-200 ===
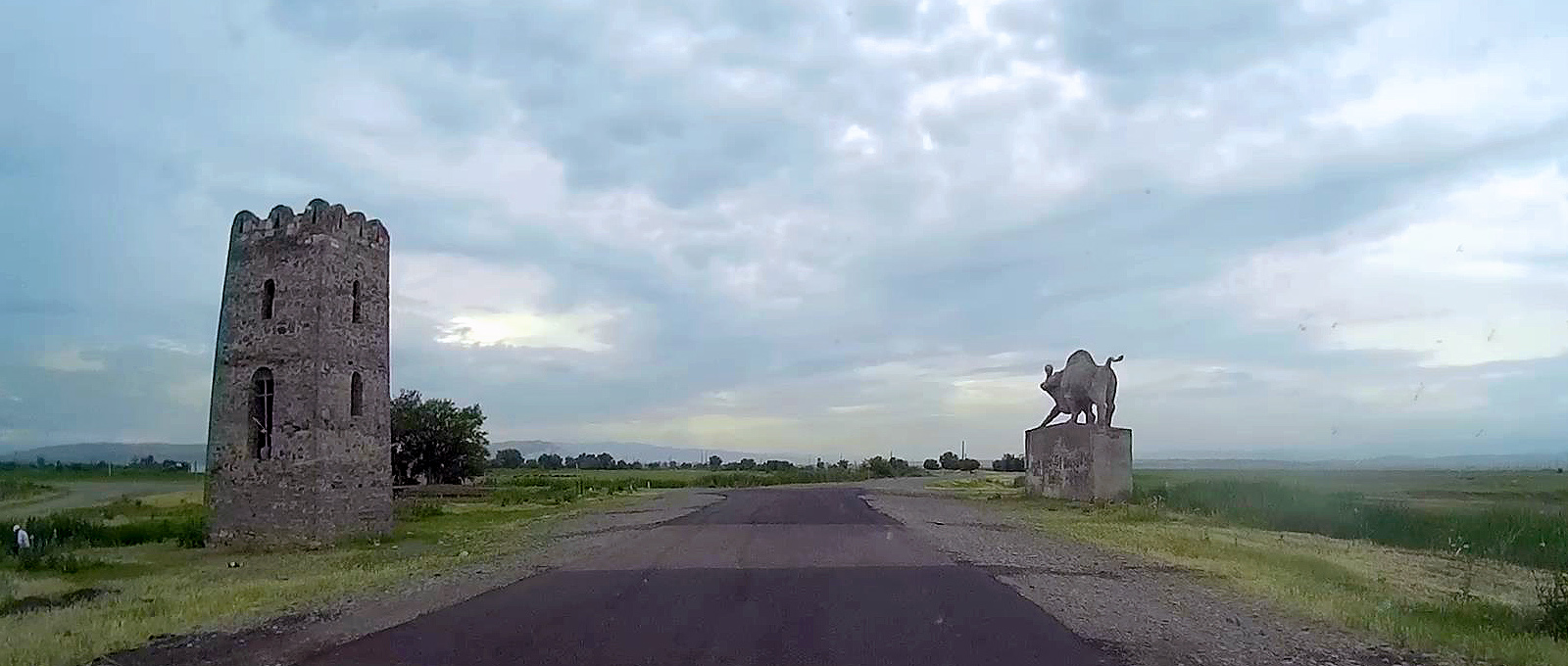
შ 157 to Rustavi

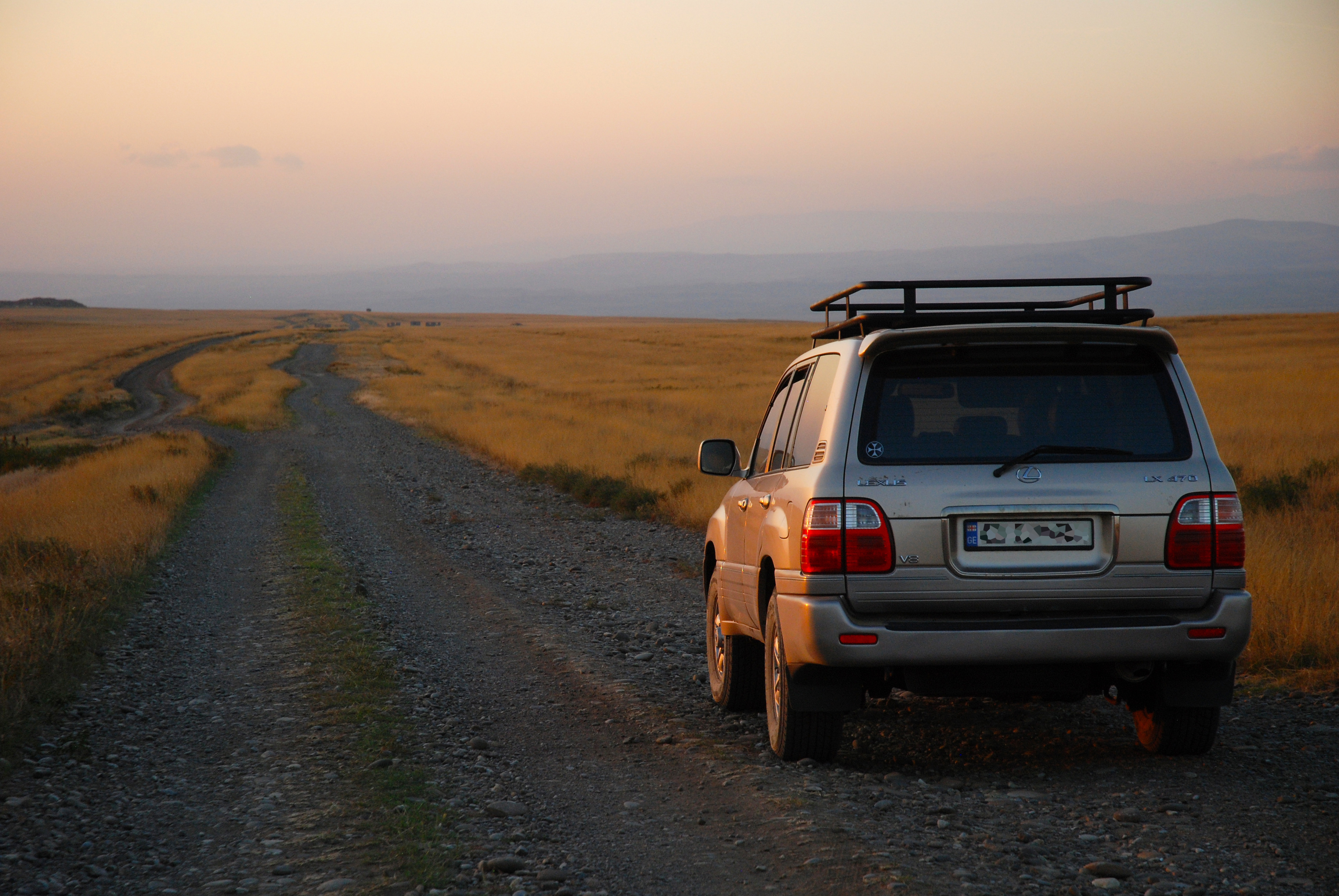
შ 158 near David Gareja

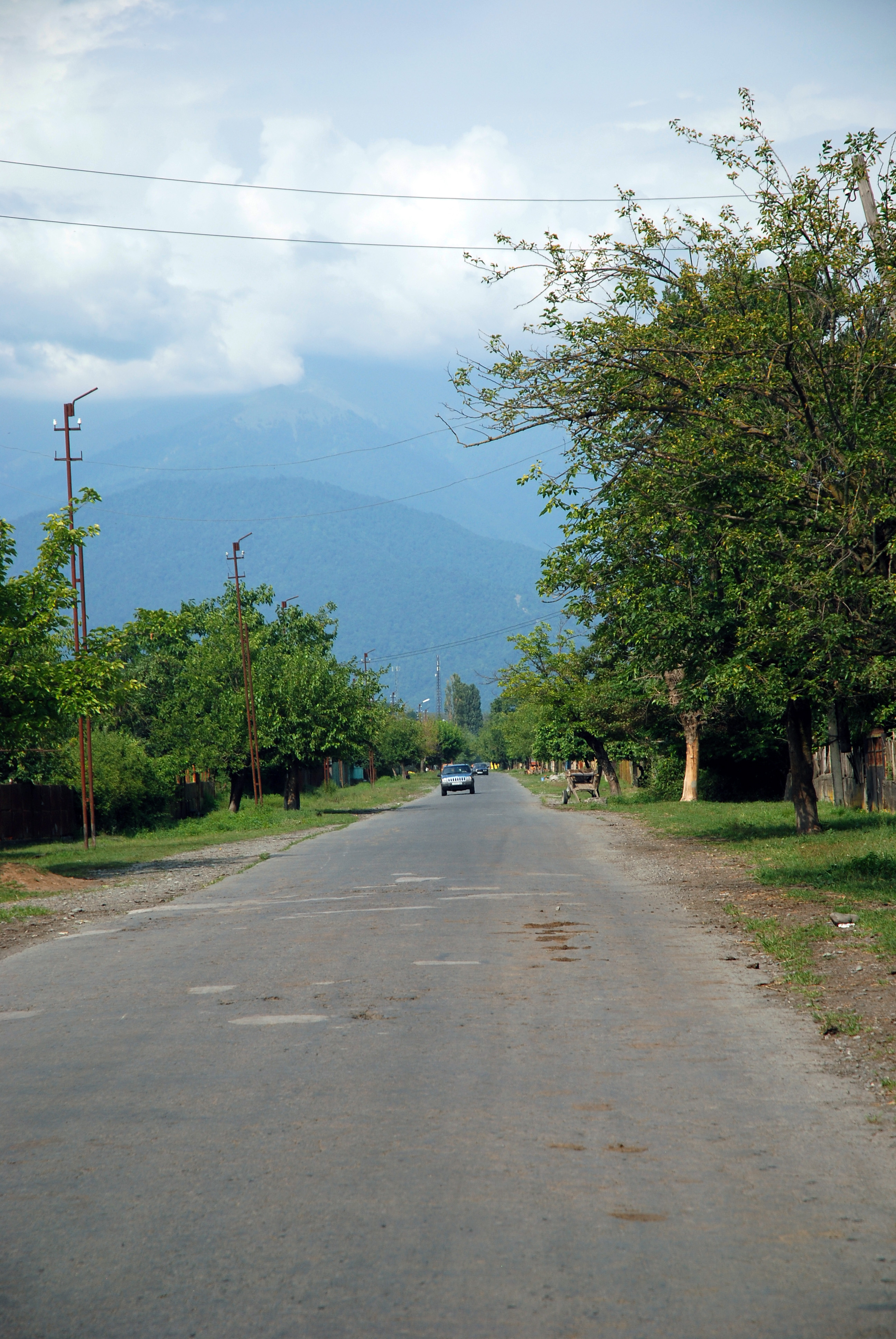
შ 170 in Apeni

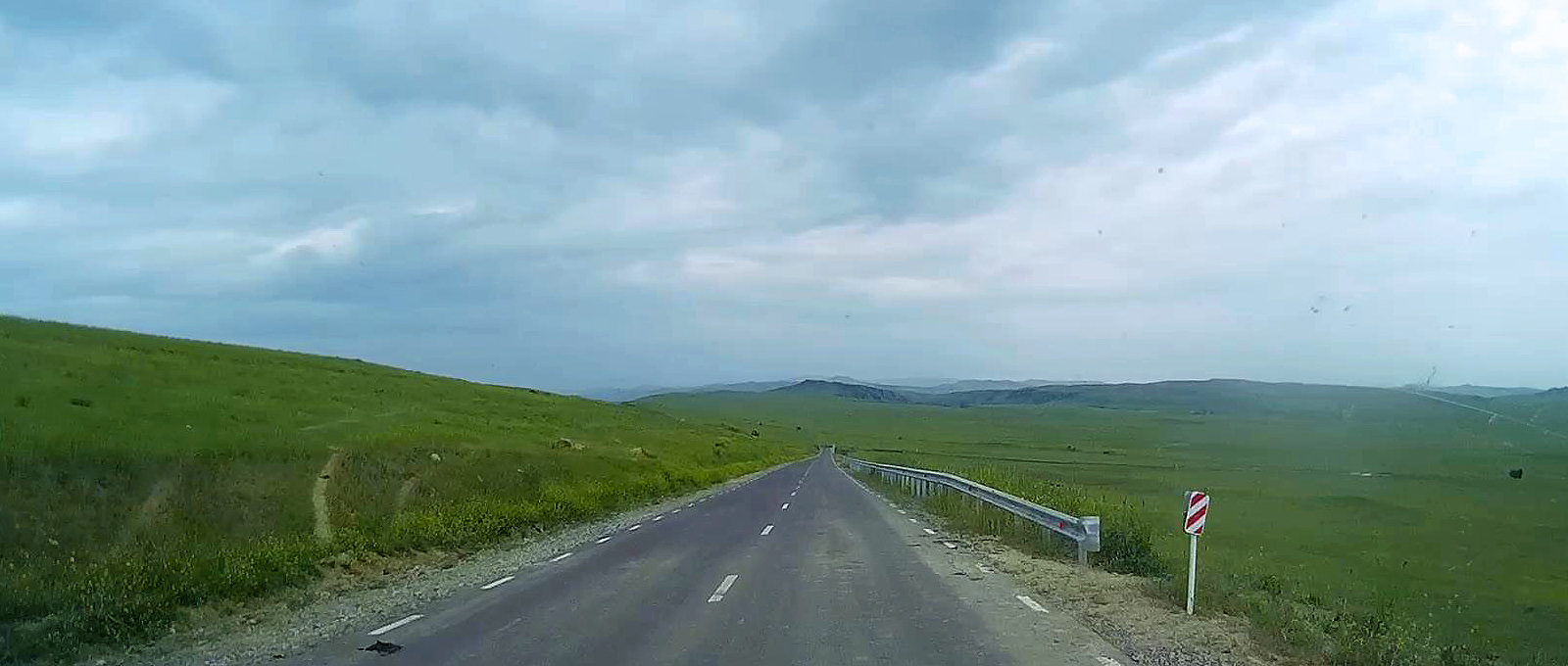
შ 172 to David Gareja

Number	Name (route)	Length (km)
შ 151	Natakhtari - Tsilkani - Mukhrani	16.1 km
შ 152	Zahesi – Jvari Monastery	6.7 km
შ 153	Nichbisi - Digdori - Didi Toneti	28 km
შ 154	Bolnisi – Sioni Monastery - Tsughrughasheni	11.7 km
შ 155	Kveshi - Dzedzvnariani - Tandzia	8 km
შ 156	Tamarisi - Darejani Palace	1.1 km
შ 157	Rustavi - Jandari	11.7 km
შ 158	Lemshveniera - David Gareja	13.5 km
შ 159	Betania Church accessroad	7 km
შ 160	Vaziani - Martqopi - Norio - Martqopi Monastery of the Deity	26.4 km
შ 161	Shulaveri – Red Bridge	23 km
შ 162	Shulaveri - Shaumiani - Sioni - Tserakvi	23.8 km
შ 163	Marneuli – Algeti (Məscidli Görarxı) - Azizkendi	18.5 km
შ 164	Tsereteli - Norgiughi - Mughanlo - Kesalo	25 km
შ 165	Amlevi - Orbeti	9.2 km
შ 166	Tetritsqaro - Ksovreti – Gudarekhi Monastery	14.5 km
შ 167	Samshvildi Fortress accessroad	1 km
შ 168	Samshvildi - Pirghebuli monastery	7 km
შ 169	Imera - Bareti - Tejisi - Chivtkilisa - Khachkoi - Gumbati - Avranlo	32 km
შ 170	Gurjaani – Chabukiani - Apeni - Kabali	29.6 km
შ 171	Gumbati - Khirsa - Samtatskaro - Sabatlo	66.8 km
შ 172	Sagarejo – Udabno - David Gareja	48.2 km
შ 173	Archiloskalo - Samtatskaro (border Azerbaijan)	6 km
შ 174	Khornabuji - Erisimedi	21.6 km
შ 175	Signagi - Tsnori	7.6 km
Number	Name (route)	Length (km)
შ 176	Signagi - St. Nino Monastery	1.2 km
შ 177	St. Nino's spring accessroad	3.1 km
შ 178	Dzveli Shuamta's Monastery accessroad	2.3 km
შ 179	Ikalto Academy accessroad	1.8 km
შ 180	Father Davity Church	3 km
შ 181	Zinobiani – Chikaani - Gavazi	12.7 km
შ 182	Kvareli - Kvareli Lake	8 km
შ 183	Akhmeta – Batsara Nature Reserve	23 km
შ 184	Zemo Khodasheni – Alaverdi Monastery – Kvemo Alvani	11.7 km
შ 185	Chuburkhinji - Nabakevi - Otobaia - Gagida	26 km
შ 186	Mokvi - Chlou - Otapi	20.8 km
შ 187	Sokhumi – Besleti	3.5 km
შ 188	Sokhumi - Gumista	3.4 km
შ 189	Sukhumi Babushara Airport accessroad	4.6 km
შ 190	Abgharkhuki - Achandara - Durifshi - Lykhny	35.8 km
შ 191	New Athos Cave accessroad	0.8 km
შ 192	Gagra – Kolkhida	8.3 km
შ 193	Leselidze - Gantiadi	9.2 km
შ 194	Leselidze – Mikelrypsh	17.2 km
შ 195	(km 43) – Natlismtsemeli Monastery	5 km
შ 196	Nikozi - Avnevi	8.5 km
შ 197	Nekresi monastery accessroad	4.4 km
შ 198	Gori (transport junction) - Variani - Sakasheti - Breti - Kareli (transport junction)	25 km
შ 199	Kubriantkari - Akhaltsikhe - Kenchaklde - Kheoba	15 km
შ 200	Kvareli Wine cellar access road	1.5 km

=== 201-209 ===
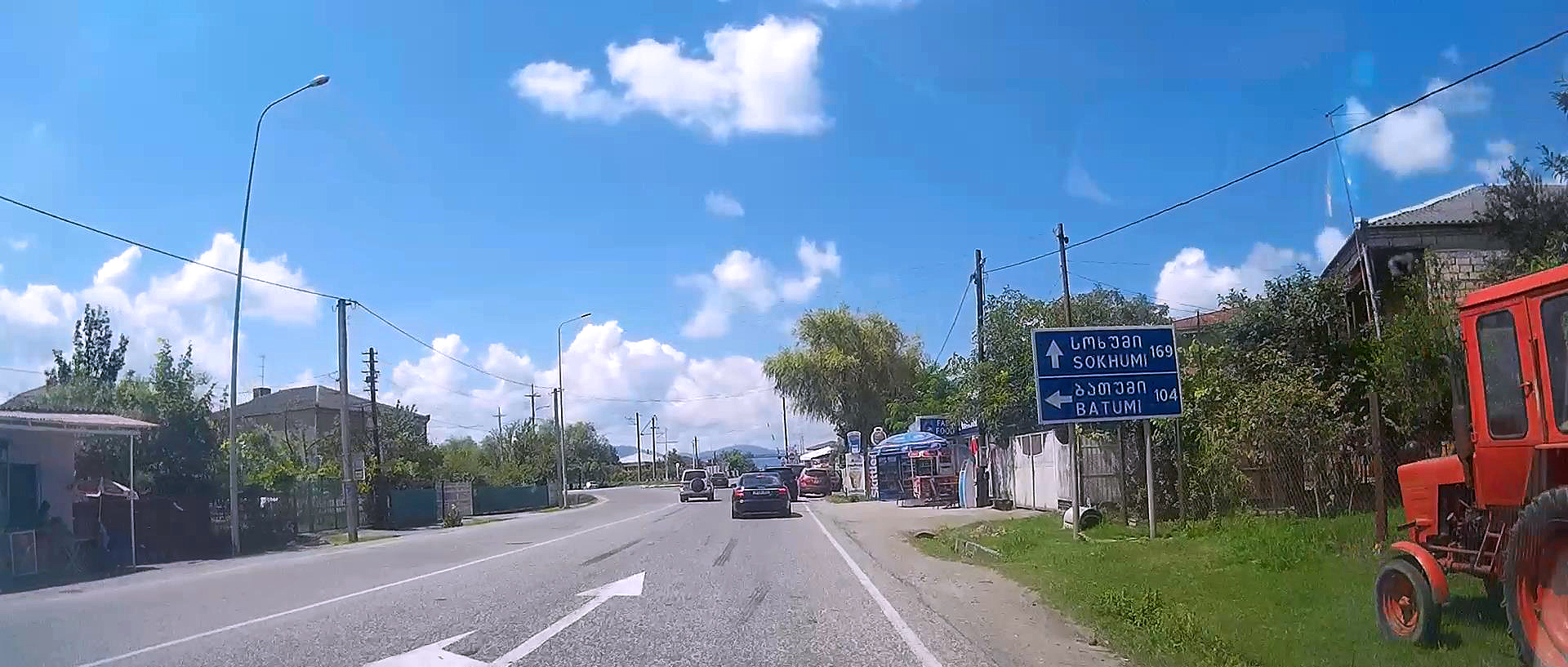
შ 204 through Samtredia

Number	Name (route)	Length (km)
შ 201	Orpiri - Tsutskhvati Cave	10.5 km
შ 202	Gori Tunnel Bypass	6.1 km
შ 203	Kareli (transport junction) - Agara - Khashuri - Surami (transport junction)	33.6 km
შ 204	Nakhshirghele - Kutaisi - Samtredia	46.3 km
შ 205	Devdoraki Tunnel Bypass	1.9 km
შ 206	Gori - Gori Tunnel Bypass	3.1 km
შ 207	Bakurtsikhe - Gurjaani - Chumlaki (Gurjaani Bypass)	15.1 km
შ 208	Japana - Lanchkhuti	13.6 km
შ 209	Sachkhere - Uzunta - Skhmeri - Zudali	46.9 km

The tables above are based on the 2022 published list of roads by the Government of Georgia.
