= S9 highway (Georgia) =

Trunk road in Georgia

S9
- საერთაშორისო 9
- Tbilisi Bypass

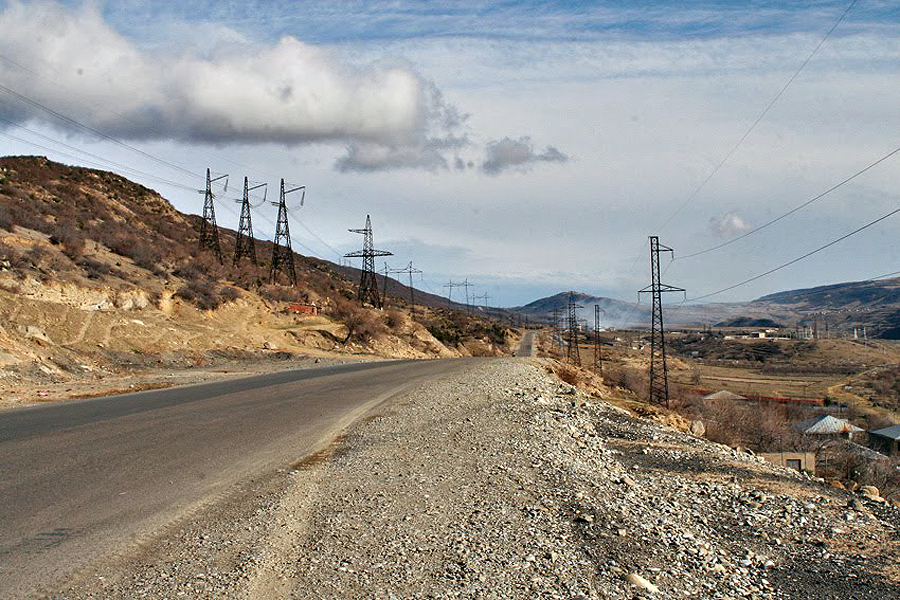
- S9 Tbilisi Bypass near Gldani

Route information
- Part of and
- Length: 49 km (30 mi)
- Existed: 1996–present

Major junctions
- North end: Mtskheta
- (km) 35 "Kakheti Highway" 45 Sh32 Gachiani
- South end: Rustavi (

Location
- Georgia
- Municipalities: Mtskheta, Tbilisi, Gardabani

Highway system
- Roads in Georgia; International Routes; National Routes

The Georgian S9 route (Georgian: საერთაშორისო მნიშვნელობის გზა ს9, Saertashoriso mnishvnelobis gza S9, road of international importance), also known as Tbilisi Bypass, is a "road of international importance" within the Georgian road network with a length of 49 kilometres (30 mi) and runs in a wide curve around the East side of Tbilisi between the S1 Highway near Mtskheta) to the S4 Highway near Rustavi. The bypass intersects with the S5 "Kakheti Highway" near the Tbilisi International Airport and is part of the European E60 and Asian AH5 and AH81 routes. Transit traffic is mandated to take the bypass around Tbilisi.

The bypass is entirely two lane and has a limited number of junctions, some of which have (partial) grade separation, although the Mtskheta end of the bypass passes through residential area. The northern terminus is located in the Mtskheta-Mtianeti region, while the northern part of the bypass is in the Tbilisi capital region and most of the bypass is located in the Kvemo Kartli region.

== Background ==
The S9 Tbilisi Bypass was commissioned in 1996, when the Georgian road numbering system was revised to replace its old Soviet system.

== Future ==
Feasibility and design studies into the upgrade of the S9 Tbilisi Bypass to four lane motorway standards have been finalized in 2020. Financed by the Asian Development Bank the studies included a 27 kilometres (17 mi) northern extension via Natakhtari to Zhinvali (parallel to the current S3 highway) on the left bank of the Aragvi river.
