= Yuxarı Mərcanlı =

- Location within Azerbaijan
- Coordinates: 39°21′56″N 47°15′17″E
- Country: Azerbaijan
- Rayon: Jabrayil
- Time zone: UTC+4 (AZT)
  - Summer (DST): UTC+5 (AZT)

Yuxarı Mərcanlı is a village in Jabrayil Rayon of Azerbaijan.

== See also ==
- Böyük Mərcanlı
- Çocuq Mərcanlı
