= S5 highway (Georgia) =

Road of international importance in Georgia

S5
- საერთაშორისო 5
- Tbilisi–Bakurtsikhe–Lagodekhi (Azerbaijan border)

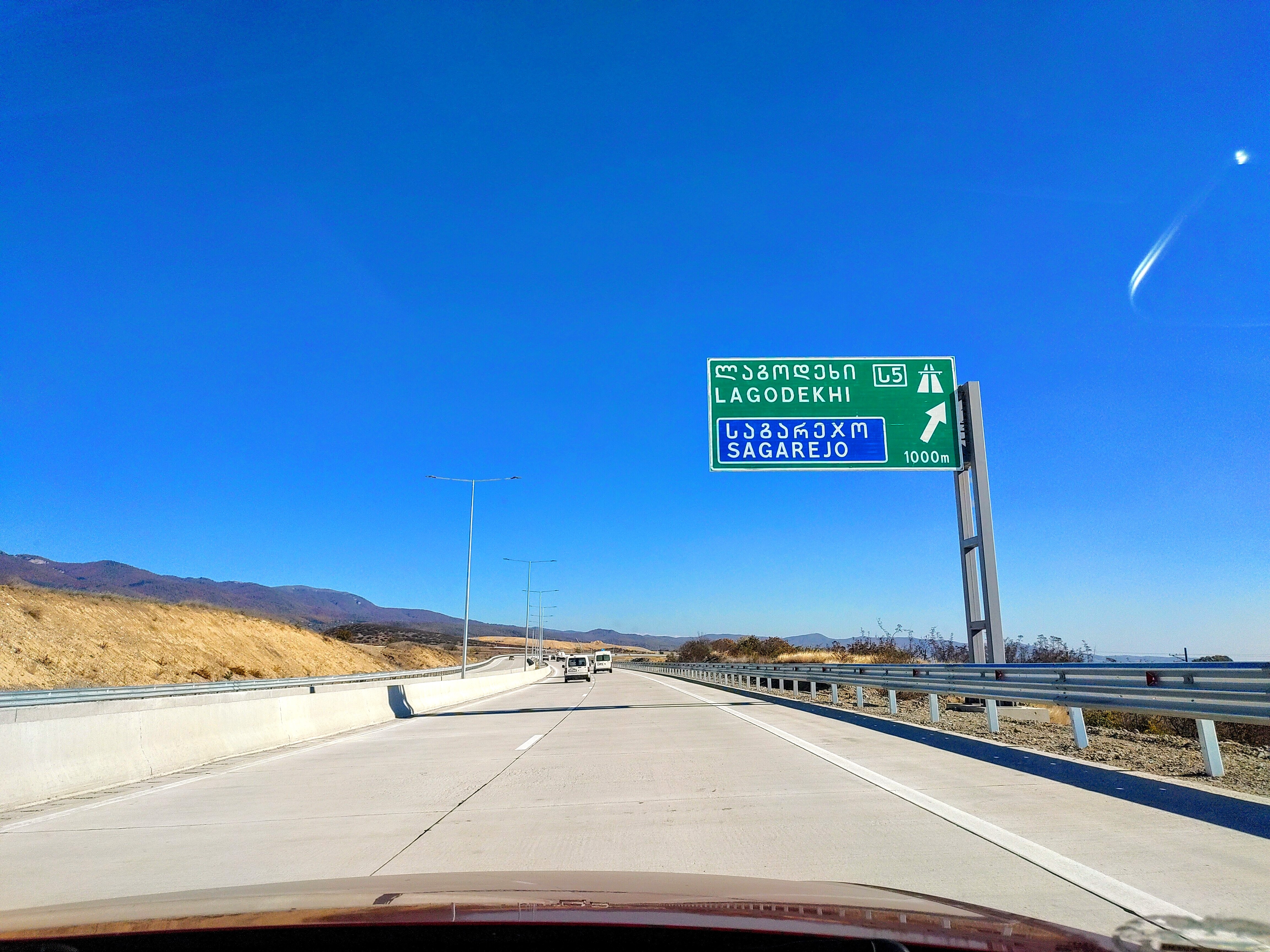
- The four-lane S5 section near Sagarejo

Route information
- Length: 162.8 km (101.2 mi)
- Existed: 1996–present

Major junctions
- West end: Tbilisi
- East end: Azerbaijan border near Lagodekhi

Location
- Georgia
- Municipalities: Tbilisi, Gardabani, Sagarejo, Gurjaani, Sighnaghi, Lagodekhi

Highway system
- Roads in Georgia; International Routes; National Routes

The Georgian S5 highway (Georgian: საერთაშორისო მნიშვნელობის საავტომობილო გზა ს-5), also known as the Kakheti Highway, is a road of international importance in Georgia, with an official length of 162.8 kilometres (101.2 mi). Its statutory name is Tbilisi–Bakurtsikhe–Lagodekhi (Azerbaijan border) (Georgian: თბილისი-ბაკურციხე-ლაგოდეხი (აზერბაიჯანის რესპუბლიკის საზღვარი)).

The highway runs east from Tbilisi via Sagarejo and Bakurtsikhe to the Azerbaijan–Georgia border in Lagodekhi Municipality. At the border, the road connects with Azerbaijan's M5 Yevlakh–Zaqatala–Georgia state border highway. The adjoining Azerbaijani border post is the Mazimgara customs checkpoint, opposite Georgia's Lagodekhi checkpoint.

== History ==
The S5 designation was introduced as part of the transition to Georgia's post-Soviet road-numbering system in 1996. Presidential Decree No. 834 of 25 December 1996 listed the S5 as the Tbilisi–Bakurtsikhe–Lagodekhi–Azerbaijan border road. Its total length was then recorded as 160 kilometres (99 mi), divided between 140 kilometres (87 mi) on the national road authority's balance and 20 kilometres (12 mi) on the balance of Tbilisi.

As result of the opening of the motorway section between Tbilisi and Tokhliauri, the defined length of the highway was adjusted in 2025 to 162.8 kilometres (101.2 mi), with 143.3 kilometres (89.0 mi) assigned to the Roads Department, while the Tbilisi governed section remained the same.

=== Early number ===
Between 1982 and 1996 the route of the current S5 between Tbilisi and the junction West of Lagodekhi was referred to as A302, originally a highway of national importance within the Soviet road network. Beyond the junction near Lagodekhi the road was part of the A315 to Zagatala and further into the Azerbaijan SSR.

=== Name and Tbilisi section ===
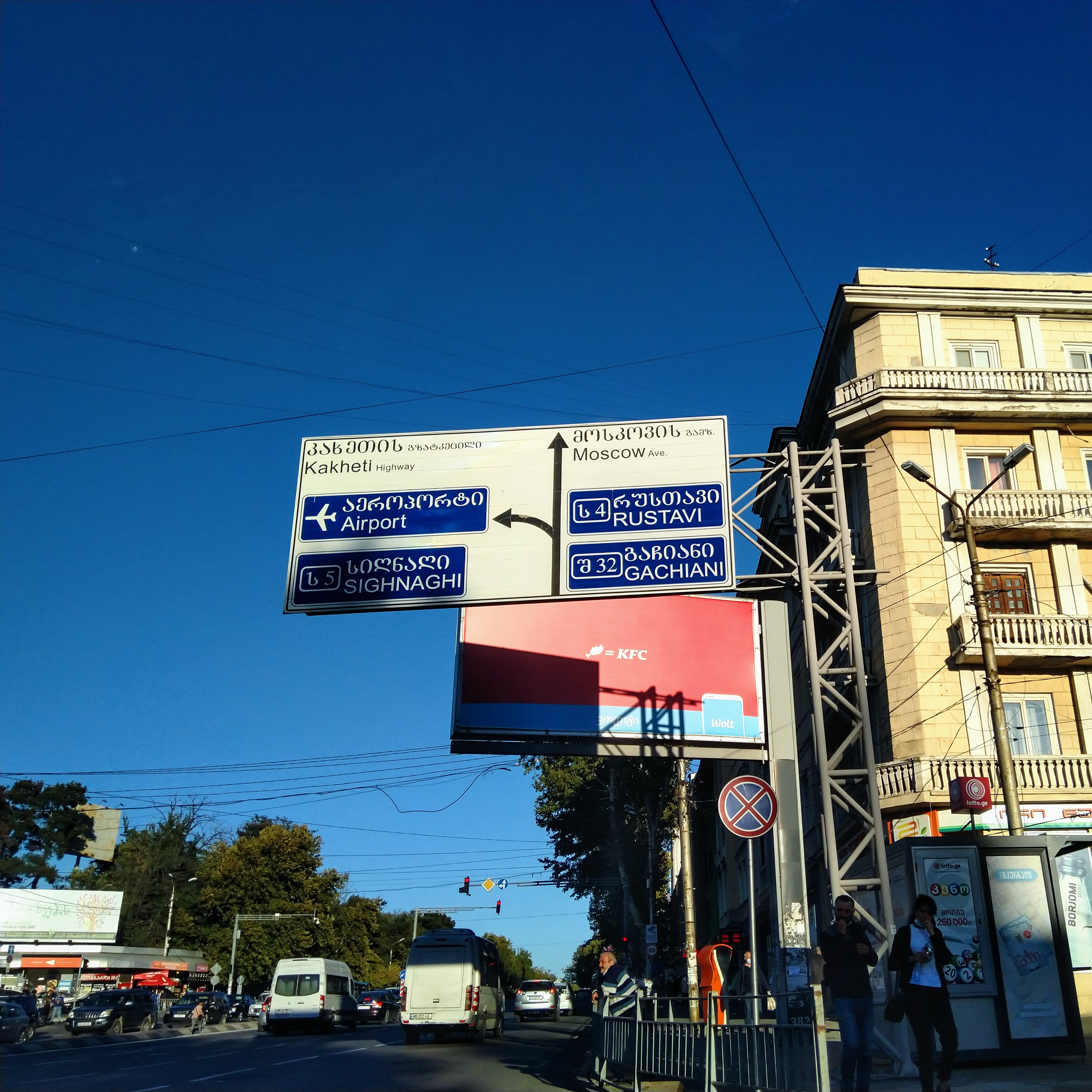
Kakheti highway with S5 on direction signs in Tbilisi.

The name Kakheti Highway (Georgian: კახეთის გზატკეცილი) is used in more than one geographic sense. In English-language project documentation, the Roads Department of Georgia uses it broadly for the S5 transport corridor and its upgrading projects, including sections outside Tbilisi. For example, official procurement documentation describes the Sagarejo–Bakurtsikhe project as the modernization of a section of the “S5 Kakheti Highway”.

Within Tbilisi, Kakheti Highway is also the name of a specific urban arterial. Municipal route documentation treats it as distinct from the adjoining streets. Bus route 337 is listed as passing successively along Ketevan Dedofali Avenue, Lech Kaczyński Street, George W. Bush Street, Kakheti Highway and Europe Street before reaching Tbilisi International Airport. The initial section of the S5, Melaani Street in the Isani-Samgori district, named after the Kakhetian village Melaani, was renamed into George W. Bush Street by the Tbilisi City Council in September 2005.

A Georgian encyclopedia published in 2008 used a broader description, defining Kakheti Highway as extending from Ketevan Dedofali Avenue to the Tbilisi municipal boundary. It states that the road originated in the 19th century and appeared on an 1895 map of Tbilisi under the name Navtlughi Highway (Georgian: ნავთლუღის გზატკეცილი).

== Upgrades ==
In the 2020s, the S5 between Tbilisi and Bakurtsikhe is being upgraded in stages to a divided controlled-access highway of two lanes in each direction. The first 35-kilometre (22 mi) section, between Tbilisi and Sagarejo (Tokhliauri), opened to traffic on 4 October 2024.

Construction subsequently continued on the 17-kilometre (11 mi) Sagarejo–Badiauri section, creating a continuously 52-kilometre (32 mi) motorway between Tbilisi, Sagarejo and Badiauri upon completion. The subsequent Badiauri–Chalaubani–Bakurtsikhe section of nearly 32-kilometre (20 mi) is set to be constructed in two separate iterations:

- Badiauri–Chalaubani, with a length of 22.6 kilometres (14.0 mi);
- Chalaubani–Bakurtsikhe, with a length of 9.1 kilometres (5.7 mi).

The financing for these sections was approved in June 2026 as part of the wider TC-GATE transport project.
