= Samtavisi Cathedral =

Georgian Orthodox cathedral near Igoeti, Georgia

Coordinates: 42°00′22″N 44°24′33″E

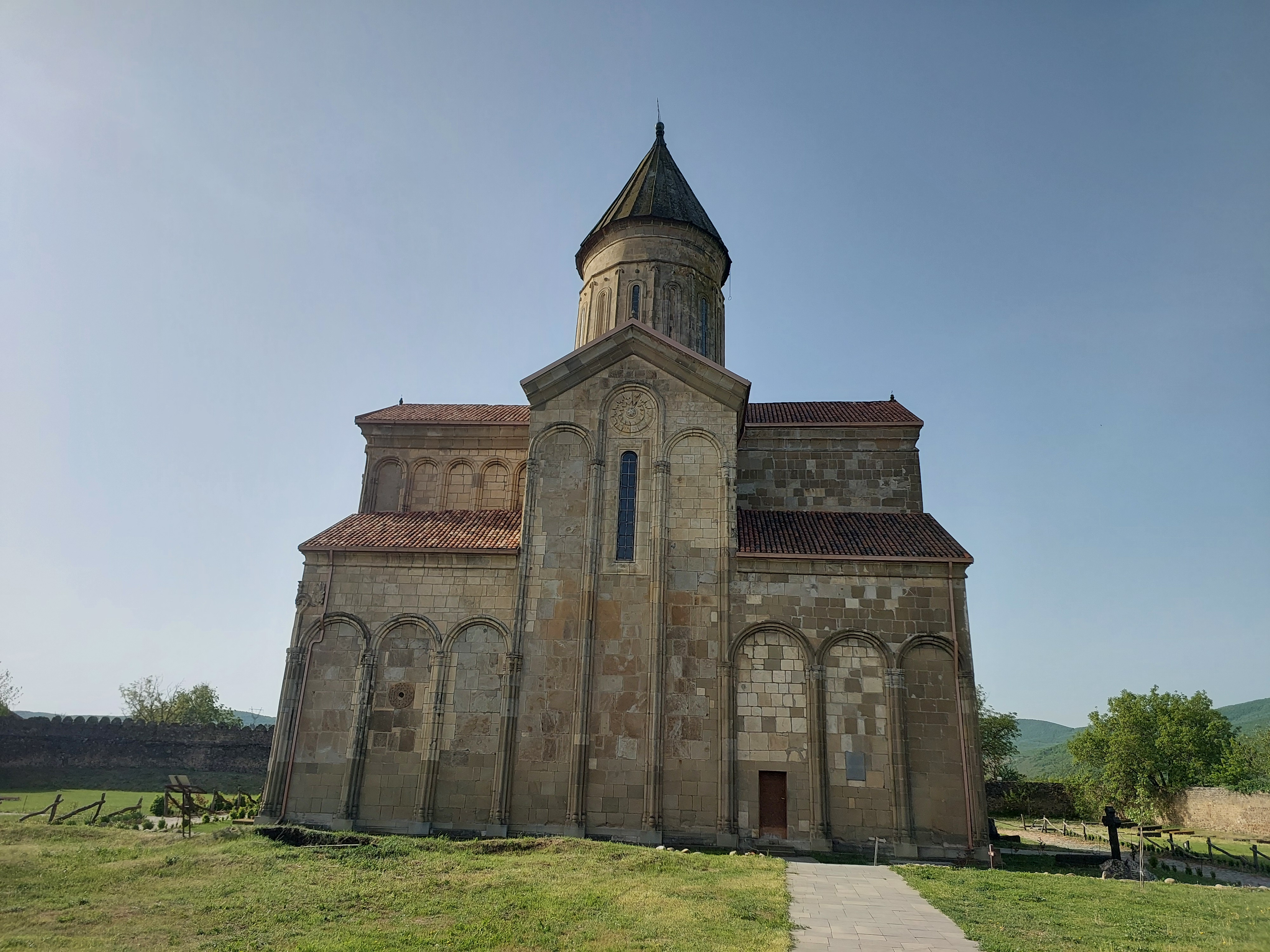
The Samtavisi Cathedral.

Samtavisi (Georgian: სამთავისი) is an eleventh-century Georgian Orthodox cathedral in eastern Georgia, in the region of Shida Kartli, some 45 km from the nation's capital Tbilisi, near Igoeti village. The cathedral is now one of the centers of the Eparchy of Samtavisi and Gori of the Georgian Orthodox Church. The church is a typical example and the founder of the Georgian interpretation of the cross-in-square churches. It was built in the period of decorative and artistic bloom in the architecture of Georgia.

== Location ==
The cathedral is located on the left bank of the Lekhura River, some 11 km of the town of Kaspi.

== History ==
According to a Georgian tradition, the first monastery on this place was founded by the Assyrian missionary Isidore in 572 and later rebuilt in the 10th century. Neither of these buildings has survived however. The earliest extant structures date to the eleventh century, the main edifice being built in 1030 as revealed by a now lost stone inscription.

The cathedral was built by a local bishop and a skillful architect Hilarion, the son of Vane Kanchaeli, who also authored the nearby church of Ashuriani. The Cathedral was heavily damaged by a series of earthquakes, when the dome and partially the western wall and the pillars collapsed. According to the inscription on the western façade, above the window, which says "The secondary builder of the temple was the daughter of king of the kings and the wife of Amilakhor, Gayane", the Cathedral was first partially reconstructed in the 15th-16th century. The noble Georgian family Amilakhvari played significant role in the history of the church.

In 1679, Givi Amilakhvari (died 1700) and his wife ordered new frescoes to be painted by Samtavisi bishop Meliton, as documented by inscription on the apse fresco. It was reconstructed again in the 19th century by the architect Ripardi, when part of decorations were lost. For example, one of the two gryphons on eastern façade. The masterly decorated eastern façade is the only surviving original structure. Other alterations included removal of portals, widening and deepening of connections between the façade quadras.

== Architecture ==
The Samtavisi Cathedral is a prolonged rectangular 4-piered cruciform domed church. It illustrates a Georgian interpretation of the cross-in-square form which set an example for many churches built in the heyday of medieval Georgia. It currently has only southern portal, but presumably also had northern and western ones. The dome rests on the altar projections and two free pillars. In contrast to earlier Georgian churches, the drum of the dome is taller surmounted by a conical roof. The reconstructed dome tholobate is unproportionally narrow. It has twelve window, seven of them are real, other five imitated. Their original ornamentation, found currently on western façade, was richer than subsequently reconstructed. The central altar apse, the prothesis and the sacristy are in eastern part. The central nave is connected to the lateral naves in the western part through the arcade.

The exterior is distinguished by the liberal use of ornamental blind arcading. The apses do not project, but their internal position is marked by deep recesses in the wall. Artistically, the most rounded portion of the church is its five-arched eastern façade, dominated by the two niches and enlivened by a bold ornate cross motif, which is a harmonic continuation of dynamic arcading. The central axis of the façade has a high cross, ornamented window and rather characteristic motif of two rombs, copied in later churches. The most elaborate decoration, a relief of gryphon can be found up in the right arch. The arcading is also spread on lateral façades. The southern façade has remnants of portal. The western façade is plain with two windows. Their ornamentation was previously on the former dome and look rather unharmonious on the wall. Western and eastern façades have inscriptions, telling about the construction year and the architect, and the subsequent reconstruction.

== Frescoes ==
The original frescoes of the 11th century, found under the apse plaster, are rather fragmentary. The 17th century frescoes, less monumental and less detailed than the earlier, remain only in the dome and the apse. The dome fresco depicts the Christ Pantocrator with six-winged seraphs and evangelists. Prophets are found between the tholobates, and Mary with Jesus among them; below the windows the archangels. Traditional Deesis is depicted in the altar conch. Multifigure Eucharist is found in the upper part of the apse, and below it, bishops with open scrolls and deacons. Dominant colors are dark brown, blue, yellow and dark grey.

== Other structures ==
Beyond the main church, the Samtavisi complex includes a badly damaged two-storied bishop's residence, a small church (5.8х3.2m), and a three-storied bell-tower (5.7х7.3m) attached to the 3-5m high fence made of stone and brick. The bell-tower, built into northern wall, dates to the 16th-17th centuries. Its ground floor has a gate, the middle floor was for the guards and the upper the belfry. All other structures date to the 17th-18th centuries. Original wall, surrounding the cathedral, did not survive. The current wall includes a rounded tower with semicircular teeth.
