= Ianeti =

Ianeti იანეთი
- Village
- Location within Georgia Location within Guria
- Coordinates: 42°00′18″N 41°55′43″E
- Country: Georgia
- Mkhare: Guria
- Municipality: Ozurgeti
- Elevation: 80 m (260 ft)

Population (2014)
  - Total: 236
- Time zone: UTC+4 (Georgian Time)

Ianeti (Georgian: იანეთი) is a village in the Ozurgeti Municipality of Guria in western Georgia. It is located along the Supsa River. As of 2014, it has a population of 236.
