= Japana, Georgia =

Village in Lanchkhuti Municipality

Japana ჯაპანა
- Village
- Japana

- Location in Georgia Japana (Georgia)
- Coordinates: 42°05′47″N 42°12′04″E
- Country: (Georgia (country)) Georgia
- Region: Guria
- District: Lanchkhuti
- Elevation: 50 m (160 ft)

Population (2014)
  - Total: 306
- Time zone: UTC+4 (Georgian Time)

Japana (Georgian: ჯაპანა, IPA: [dʒapʼana]) is a village in Lanchkhuti Municipality, which is in the Nigoti community. It is located in North Guria, 50 m above sea level and 7.45 miles (12 km) away from Lanchkhuti. In the village, there is a railway station on the Samtredia-Makhinjauri line and the road of international importance passes. Abasha, a path of domestic importance, also passes. Georgia Highway 12 passes through the village. There are three lakes in the village: Japana Lake, Didi Narional and Small Orange.

== Architecture ==
=== Medieval fortress ===
The monument of Georgian architecture - the medieval fortress, is preserved in the village. The fortress is located on a rocky hill. Near the fortress is a large village with the remains of 3 churches, one of which is called "Little Booth".

=== Citadel ===
The highest place is a citadel surrounded by a wall with towers. The walls are constructed with bricks and mortar.

== Population ==
Population of Japana
Year	People	Percentage of increase or decrease
1908	350	
1911	407	+16.29%
2002	361	-11.3%
2014	306	-15.24%

== Fishing ==
During Soviet Times in 1934, a fish farm was arranged in the village with an area of 140 hectares (0.54 mi^{2}). The floodwaters were taken from the Rioni and Kheviskali rivers. The fish farm produced 70 - 80 tons of fish.

== See also ==
- Georgian Soviet Encyclopedia
