= Igoeti =

Village in Georgia

Igoeti იგოეთი
- Village
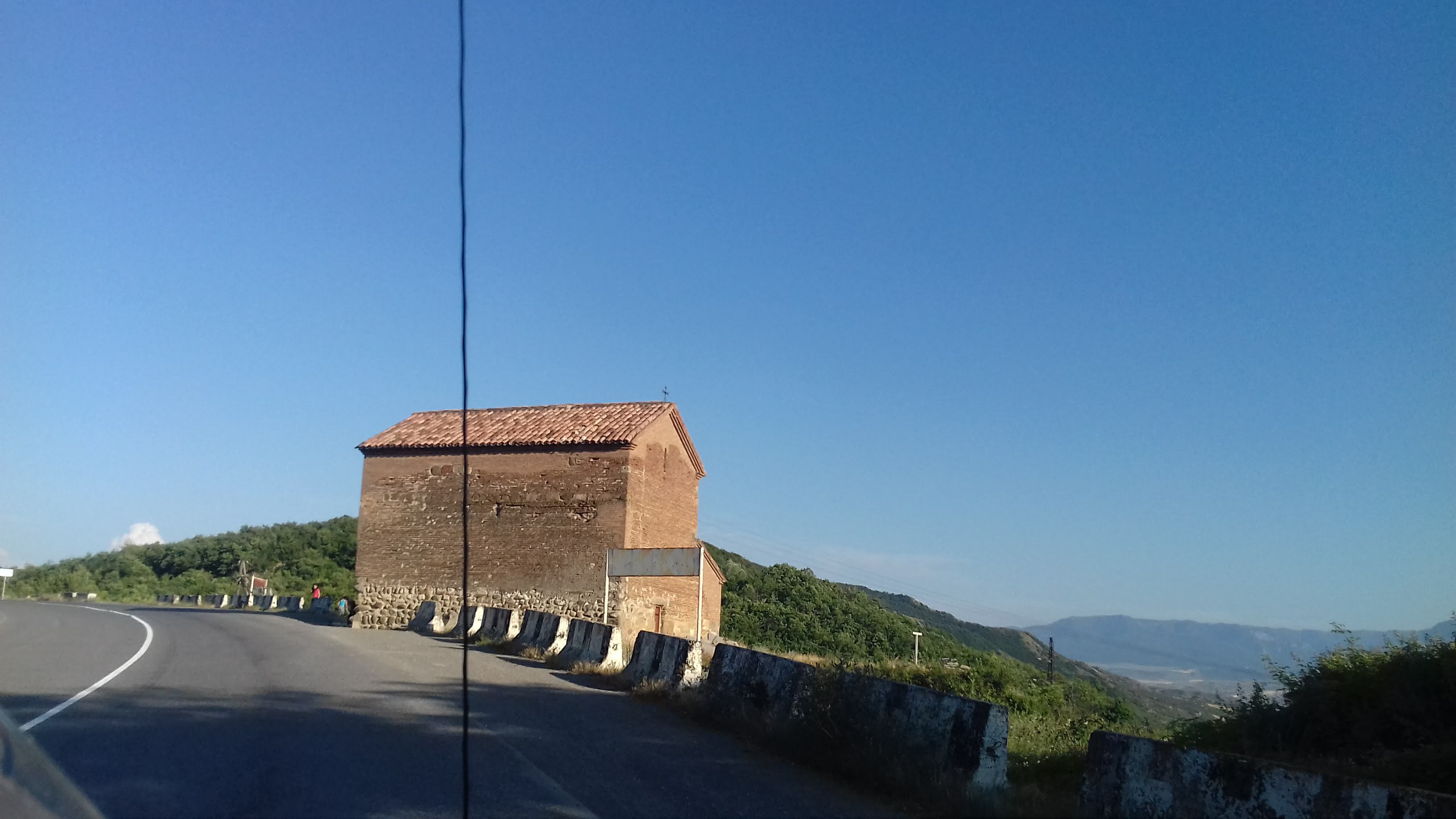

- Location in Georgia
- Coordinates: 41.987256°N 44.407425°E
- Country: Georgia
- Region: Shida Kartli
- Municipality: Kaspi

Population
  - Total: 559

Igoeti or Igoet'i (In Georgian: იგოეთი) is a village in Georgia in the region of Shida Kartli. It had a population of 559 people in 2014 and has one river running through it.

== History ==
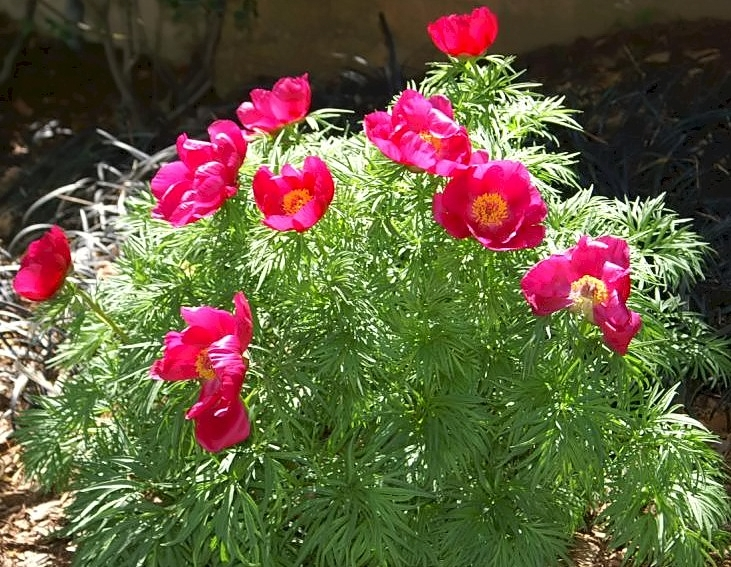
P. tenuifolia, which was first recorded in Igoeti.

Igoeti was founded in the twelfth (XII) century. Igoeti is near the Mtkvari River (sometimes called the Kura) which has sustained the people near Igoeti and beyond for over 7,000 years. Running through Igoeti also is the Lekhura river. Several species in the Paeonia genus have been recorded in Igoeti. Then, during the Russo-Georgian war, Russian troops stopped in Igoeti on 15 August, the closest they had gotten to Tbilisi, before a ceasefire agreement was signed.

== Demographics ==
Igoeti's population as of 2014 was 559. From 2002 to 2014 there was a -1.6% population decline. 51.2% of Igoeti's population is female and 48.8% of Igoeti's population is male.

=== Ethnic groups ===
97.8% of Igoeti, or 542 people, are Georgians. 3 people, or 0.5% of the population in Igoeti are Armenians. The remaining 9 people or 1.6% of Igoeti's population have another ethnicity.

=== Language ===
Georgian is spoken in Igoeti. Georgian is the official language in Georgia, where Igoeti is located. The Georgian Lari is used in Igoeti.

=== Elevation ===
Igoeti's elevation is 651 metres (712 yd).

== Important sites ==
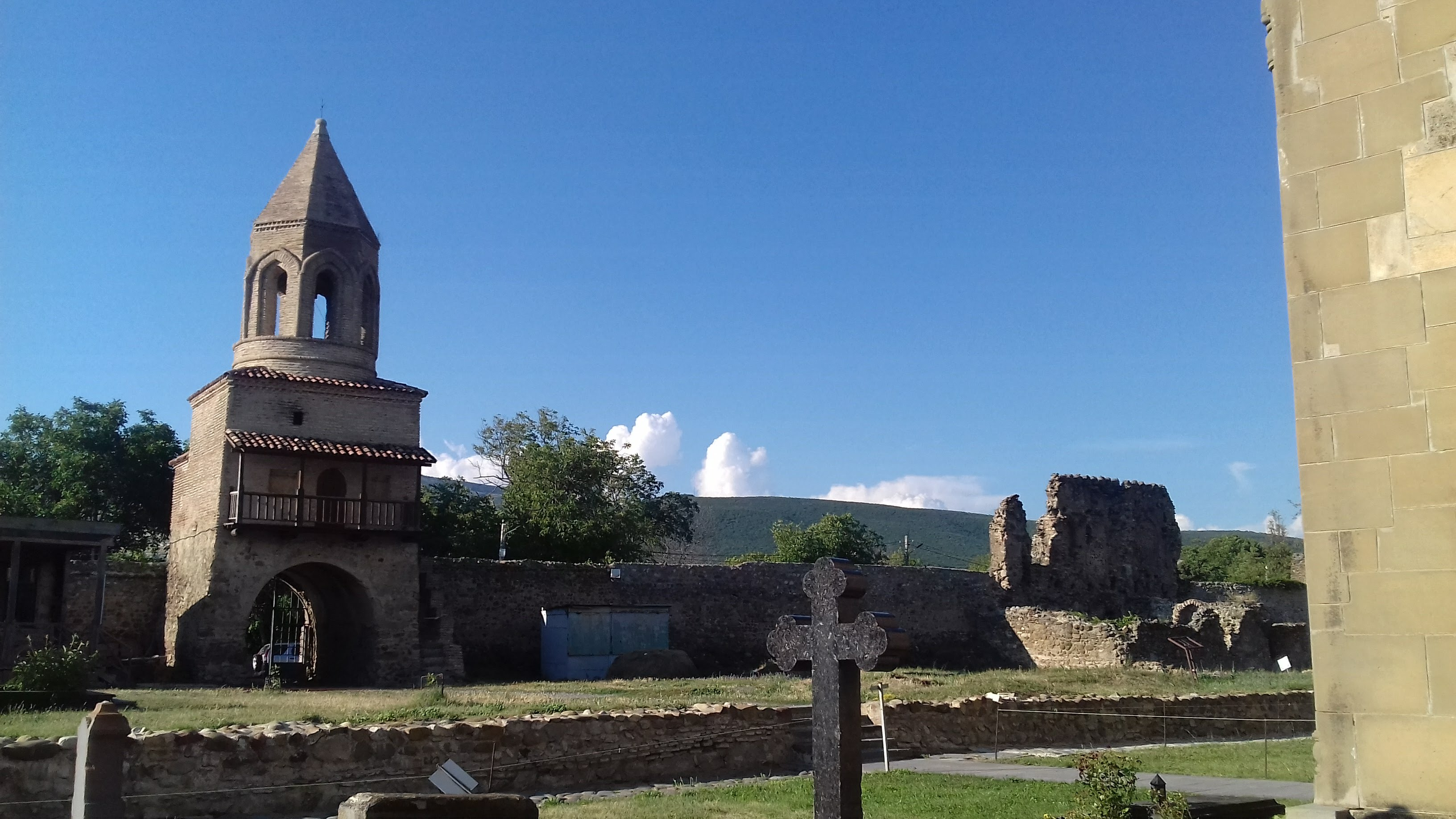
The Samtavisi Cathedral in Igoeti.

Sites
Site
Monument to the Defenders of the Fortress
Samtavisi Cathedral
Shio-Mgvime Monastery
Stalin Museum
Cathedral of the Nativity of the Blessed Virgin
Grakliani Hill

The school in Igoeti is the Igoeti Public School. Winemaking is also very popular in Igoeti. Local tradition says that you must throw coins out to the church in Igoeti while passing it in the car to travel the route safely.

== Location ==
Igoeti is located in Shida Kartli, which is situated in Eastern Georgia and is also in the South Caucasus region. It is located in Eurasia. Igoeti is settled on the Eurasian plate. It is near the E60 in Georgia and Europe and running through Igoeti is the Igoeti-Kaspi-Akhalkalaki Road. Igoeti is near the city of Kaspi (კასპი) and is around 9 kilometres (5.6 mi) away. It is around 53 kilometres (33 mi) away from Georgia's capital and largest city, Tbilisi (თბილისი). Igoeti is nearest to the Black Sea. Igoeti's Postal Code is 2609 and its telephone code is +995. It is on Georgia Standard Time.

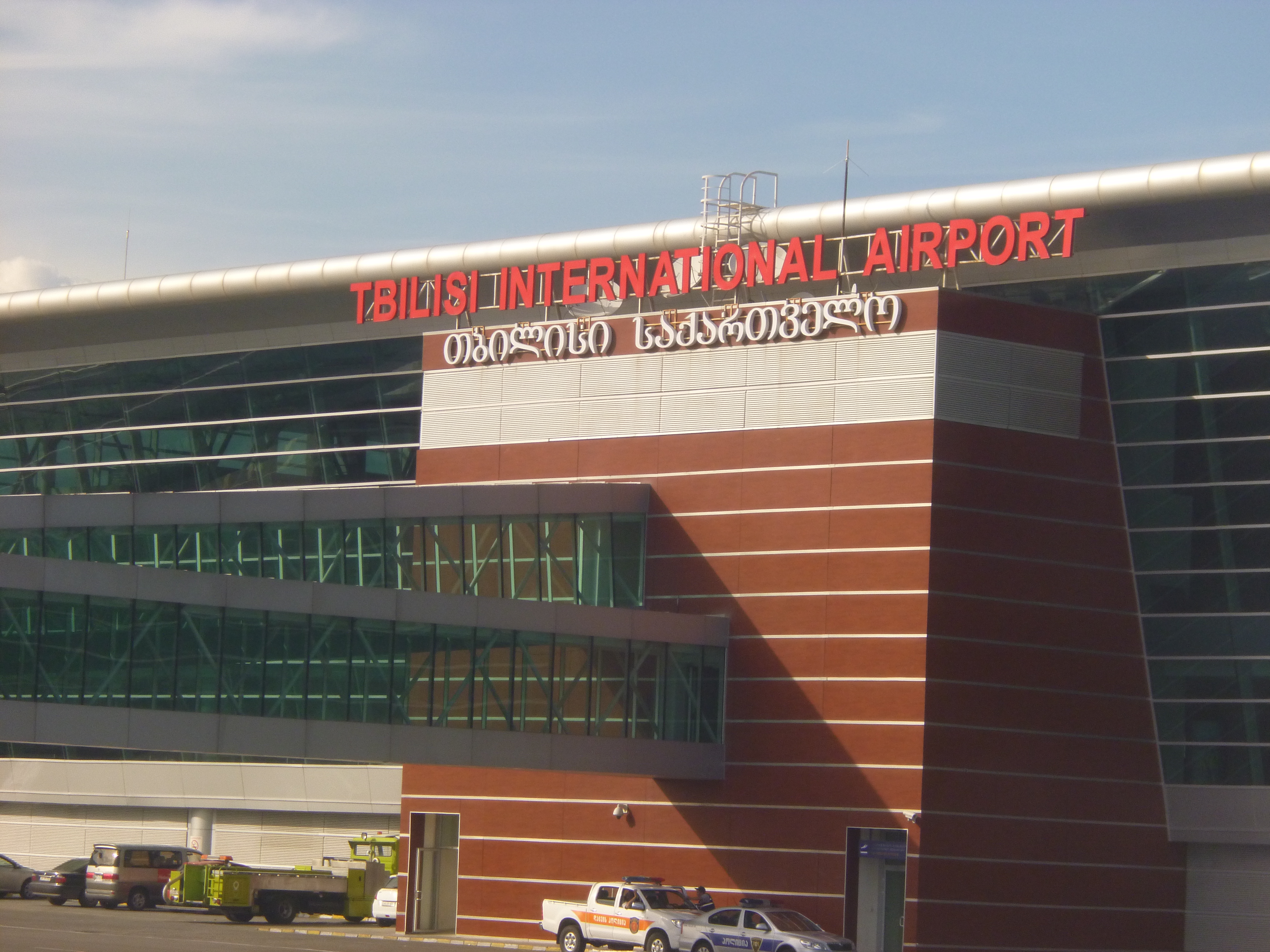
The Tbilisi International Airport.

=== Nearby airports ===
Nearby airports in kilometres and miles
Name of airport	Number of kilometres away	Number of miles away	Location (Country)	Citation
Tbilisi International Airport	57	35	Georgia	
Vladikavkaz (Or Beslan Airport)	137	85	Russia	
David the Builder Kutaisi International Airport	161	100	Georgia	
Nalchik Airport	181	112.46	Russia	
Zvartnots International Airport	205	127	Armenia	

== See also ==
- Russo-Georgian War
