= Bakurtsikhe =

- ბაკურციხე
- Georgia
- Coordinates: 41°41′28″N 45°51′33″E
- Country: Georgia
- District: Gurjaani district
- Region: Kakheti
- Elevation: 1,440 ft (440 m)

Population (2014)
  - Total: 2,574
- Time zone: UTC+4 (Georgian Time)

Bakurtsikhe is a village in the Gurjaani District of the Kakheti region, Georgia.

Bakurtsikhe is located on the right side of the river Alazani and on both sides of the Chalaubniskhevi river. It sits 440m above the sea level. It is 8 km from Gurjaani, with a population of 2,574 as of 2014.

== See also ==
- Kakheti

== Sources ==
- "ბაკურციხე" (PDF). Georgian Soviet Encyclopedia. Vol. 2. Tbilisi. 1977. p. 162.
