= Gachiani =

Gachiani გაჩიანი
- Historical region

- Location within Kvemo Kartli Location within Georgia
- Coordinates: 41°18′55″N 45°07′31″E; An approximate geographical area.
- Country: Kingdom of Iberia
- Mkhare: Kvemo Kartli
- Capital: Armazi

Gachiani (Georgian: გაჩიანი) was a historical city and district in Lower Iberia/Kvemo Kartli in southeast Georgia. Its exact location and boundaries remain unclear.

== History ==
The medieval tradition of Leonti Mroveli ascribes the foundation of Gachiani to an eponymous mythic lord, Gachios, son of Kartlos. The 10th-century Armenian historian Ukhtanes of Sebastia places Gachiani (Gajenaget) in what he refers to as the Plain of Georgians (Vrac' Dašt) and considers it to be a later name of the earlier town of Tsurtavi (C'urtaw). On the other hand, the early 18th-century Georgian scholar Prince Vakhushti of Kartli locates Gachiani on the right bank of the river Ktsia.

The land of Gachiani was one of the marshlands between ancient Iberia (Georgia) and Armenia and changed its masters more than once in the course of history. It formed part of the Iberian duchy of Samsvhilde in the 4th-3rd century BC, but its southwest portion was annexed to the Armeno-Georgian principality of Gogarene in the 4th century, and then briefly fell under the Armenian Bagratid control in 888 and 914/8. Its later history is essentially the same as that of Samshvilde and the district southwest of Tbilisi in general. Currently, Gachiani is a name of the predominantly Azerbaijani-populated village in Georgia's Gardabani district.
