= Norio (village) =

Norio Georgian: ნორიო
- village
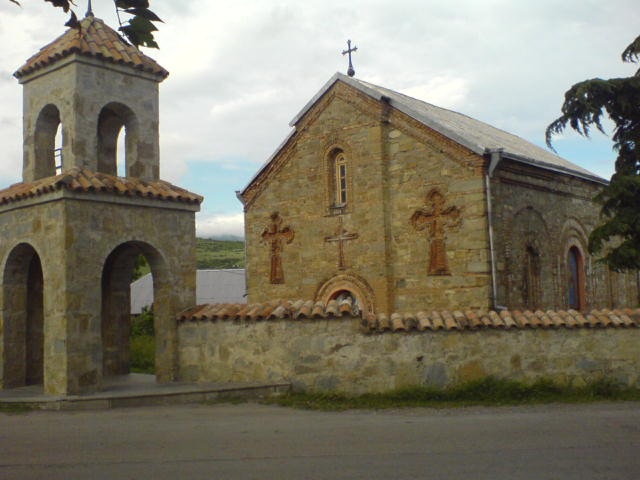
- Ghvtismshobelis Church of Norio

- Location within Kvemo Kartli Location within Georgia
- Coordinates: 41°47′18″N 44°58′43″E
- Country: Georgia
- Region: Kvemo Kartli
- District: Gardabani District
- First mention: Unknown

Population (2014)
  - Total: 3,756
- Climate: Cfb

Norio is a village in Gardabani District, Kvemo Kartli, Georgia. Community Center for Villages: Norio, Upper Kvishiani, Lower Kvishiani.

== Geography ==
It is located east of Tbilisi, in the southern foothills of Yalnos Ridge, on a plateau between the rivers Norikhevi and Pashatrikhev, at an altitude of 820 m above sea level. It is 50 km away from Gardabani, 25 km from Tbilisi. The village is bordered by Martkopi to the east, Tbilisi Reservoir to the west, Akhali Samgori and Tsilubani to the south.

=== Hydro resources ===
The rivers Norikhevi and Pashatrikhevi are connected with the village. To the south, they join the Martkopi and Satskhene-Akhalsopeli rivers and form the Lochini River. There are many springs in the vicinity of the village: Nephistskaro, Angel's spring, Ifni spring, Eagle spring, Nikolaant Milkhina and Milkhini branch and others. As for drinking water from the west, it is extracted from the springs of Ashkaveti, Kalamadze and Tsilubani. It flows from Nasoflar Shvindadze from the north. Near the village there is sulfur water, which comes out from the bottom of the so-called All-Holy. It was used to treat skin. There is healing mud in the forest. (At the foot of the Zaravin Pantes) Salt water also flows into the forest, which is used to knead dough and make pickles.

=== Flora and Fauna ===
It is surrounded by deciduous forests to the north and northeast of Norio. Where oak, beech, caraway, maple and Georgia forest fruit species typical: Panta, Majalo, Balamtsara, Shout, hawthorn, Kvrinchkhi, blackthorn and in some places artificially cultivated conifers and walnuts are present. Forests are replaced by meadows, which are rich in herbaceous plants used by the locals to develop livestock and beekeeping.

The following species of animals inhabit the Norio forests: lynx, wolf, tortoise, fox, rabbit, roe deer, marten, Wild cat. Seniors say there were plenty of brown bear and deer in the 50s and 70s. From domestic animals the natives have bred: cows, pigs, sheep and goats. From birds: chicken, turkey, duck, goose and sisir.

== History ==
The presence of bronze spearheads and stone tombs discovered during archeological excavations in the Norio area indicates settlement there from the late Bronze Age, 3500–3000 years ago. The etymology of the toponym Norio itself has not been determined. In the description of the life of Anton Martkopeli, Iakob Gogebashvili mentions that Noria was called the father of the village. In ancient times, Norio's cultivation was on a steep slope on the left bank of the Norikhev River.

During his reign, David VII of Georgia (David Ulu), fell ill with an unknown disease while defending against the Mongols at the fortifications of Derbent (Siba). He was brought to the Martqopi monastery, known as the Monastery of God (4 km away from Norio), where a church tabernacle (also known as a Zion in Eastern churches), containing the Eucharistic host was placed. In the religious tradition of the Georgian Orthodox Church, David Ulu was thus saved from death in a Eucharistic miracle. During the third invasion by Timur in 1394, his Mongol forces attacked the population of Norio-Martkopi. Even the monastics had been trained to fight. The safety of the acheiropoieton, an icon "made without hands" by the miraculous transfer from the sacred Image of Edessa, was endangered by the impending battle. It had reputedly been brought to Norio-Martkopi from Edessa in the 6th century, by Anton Martkopeli, one of the Thirteen Assyrian Fathers. Rustaveli Giorgi, Bishop of Rustavi hid the treasured icon for safety; however, he was killed in the battle with Timur's forces. The icon has not been found since that time. The Rustaveli's remains were interred within the Martqopi monastery, and transferred to Tbilisi Sioni Cathedral in 1818.

Norio is also mentioned in the "Paris Chronicles": "On the order of Mouravi" [the Mouravi being Giorgi Saakadze], "Georgians rallied and attacked Martkopi, on the night of Noria's Annunciation, at the head of the Kizilbash. Karchkha Khan Sadari and Usupkhan Shirvan Khan and the sultans were also killed".(p. 48) That is, it seems that the Norio people themselves took an active part in the battle of Martkopi. Norio was historically part of Kakheti. Kakhetia is on the border, near the village of Tbilisi and Mtskheta. After the siege of Kakheti by Shah Abbas, the invasions of the Dagestanis in eastern Georgia became more intense, especially in the 18th century, in the protection of Tbilisi from the East.

In October 1795, Martkopi, a detachment of Lekti Marbiel was going to invade Norio through the forest, they noticed a spy "Tsatura" from the Takashvili family tower. The Leks were so brave that they laid down their arms and even started swimming in the small lake there. The Norians were also helped by the Martkopi in the battle against the Leks, and they defeated a detachment of 1,500 men. D. Batonishvili writes in the new history: "They saw the impotence of the Georgians, gathered more than one thousand five hundred, came to Norio, except for a lot" [i.e. except for one portion] "... Zaal Andronikashvili, who was bravely found in every part of Georgia." Zaal Andronikashvili was the mouravi of Martkopi and Norio was included in the territory of the mouravi for Martkopi. The battlefield is still called Naomi Series. The lake no longer exists, but this place is still mentioned as Nalekaristba.

There is another historical place near Norio, the so-called Narusses. 1803 This year Russian General Guliakov camped here with troops when he was going to attack the rebellious lords fortified in Martkopi (after the unification of the Kingdom of Kartli-Kakheti by Russia by the decision of the Russian emperor Bagrationi had to be deported, which was followed by an uprising).

From the 18th century the location of the village changed due to a natural disaster, which washed away the slope and affected the population. The relocation and settlement on the right bank of the river ended in the 1940s. Historian Iv. Arjevanidze in his book "From Tbilisi to Alazani Valley" points out: Before the advent of the 19th century Norio, Martkopi and Satskhenisi were crucial military fortifications on the outskirts of the city Tbilisi, Dagestan – To defend the capital city from the enemies who came from Leketi.

On 19 June 1898, the Iveria newspaper reported that shale oil was being extracted in Norio. In 1938 oil began to be extracted again. Norio shale oil is very high quality. It contains a small amount of sulfur; this property makes it unique. From this was obtained a much-needed product – Luminoflor, called "Noriola". This product was used in construction with precision tools. Norio oil is used to extract frost-based transmission oil used in the Arctic and northern regions. Oil production is currently suspended.

The people of Norio took an active part in World War I and World War II. In the center of the village, next to the House of Culture, stands a memorial to the victims of the war, where the surnames and first names of 304 Norians who could not return to the village are carved. An obelisk is erected in the school yard to commemorate the 20 students who were drafted from the school desk into the army and killed in battle.

During the Soviet period, there was a dairy farm in the village.

== Education and Culture ==
There is a public school in the village with about 500 to 600 students. There is a music school in the village. There is a house of culture in the village. There is a Library and an ethnographic museum.

== See also ==
- Kvemo Kartli
