= Kumisi Lake =

- კუმისის ტბა
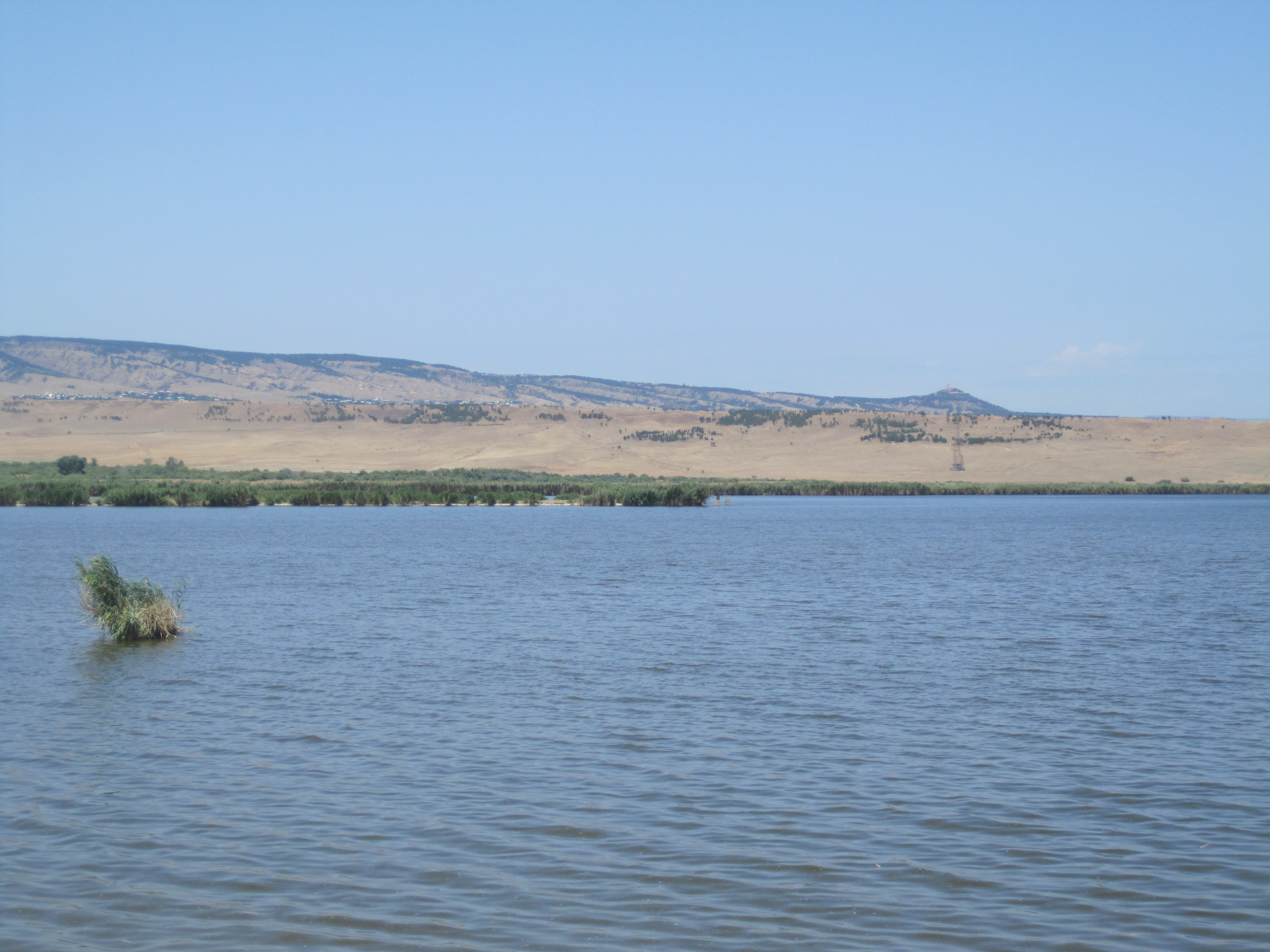
- Interactive map of Kumisi Lake
- Location: Gardabani Municipality, Kvemo Kartli, Georgia
- Coordinates: 41°35′07″N 44°50′29″E
- Type: artificial lake
- Surface area: 5.4 square kilometres (2.1 sq mi)
- Average depth: 2 metres (6.6 ft)
- Max. depth: 4 metres (13 ft)
- Water volume: 0.011 cubic kilometres (14,000,000 cu yd)

Kumisi Lake (Georgian: კუმისის ტბა) is an artificial lake in eastern Georgia, in Gardabani municipality, in Kvemo Kartli area, southeast of Kumisi village. It used to be a lake, now it is a reservoir. The village of New Kumis is located on the southern shore of the lake, and the railway station is located nearby.

Kumisi Lake is located in the basin of the same name between Yagluji plateau and Tsalaskuri plain, at an altitude of 475 m above sea level. Surface area 5.4 km^{2}, basin area 97 km^{2}, stretching 3.2 km from west to east, 2 km from north to south. Maximum depth 4 m.

In the 1960s, the area of the lake was only 0.48 km^{2}, and its depth reached 50 cm. Before the lake was expanded, its water was bitter-salty. Until 1967, there was salt water seeping from the rocks. In 1967, a large-scale project was implemented – salt water was drained from the lake and two canals were attached. An irrigation canal from the lake was made.

The lake is fed by rainwater and small streams. Currently, it is supplied with water from the Mtkvari River through an artificial channel and water pumps. The reservoir is used for irrigation. The bottom of the lake is covered with sulphide mud with curative properties. Kumisi mud is actively used in the balneological resort of Tbilisi.

Kumisi lake is a vital stopover for more than 10 0000 birds each year, as they refuel on the lake’s rich soup of aquatic creatures before continuing their annual southward migration. Located near the capital city of Tbilisi, the lake faces many threats. Its protection is vital for 270 species Kumisi Lake sits at a crossroads of the Black Sea/Mediterranean Flyway - one of the world's major migration routes where millions of birds travel between three continents twice each year.

Here's what makes Kumisi remarkable: it's an artificial reservoir that evolved into a critical wildlife sanctuary supporting 270 bird species. Migrants use it as a vital rest stop. Endangered species nest in its reeds and hunt in its shallows. Year-round residents depend on its waters for survival.

== Gallery ==
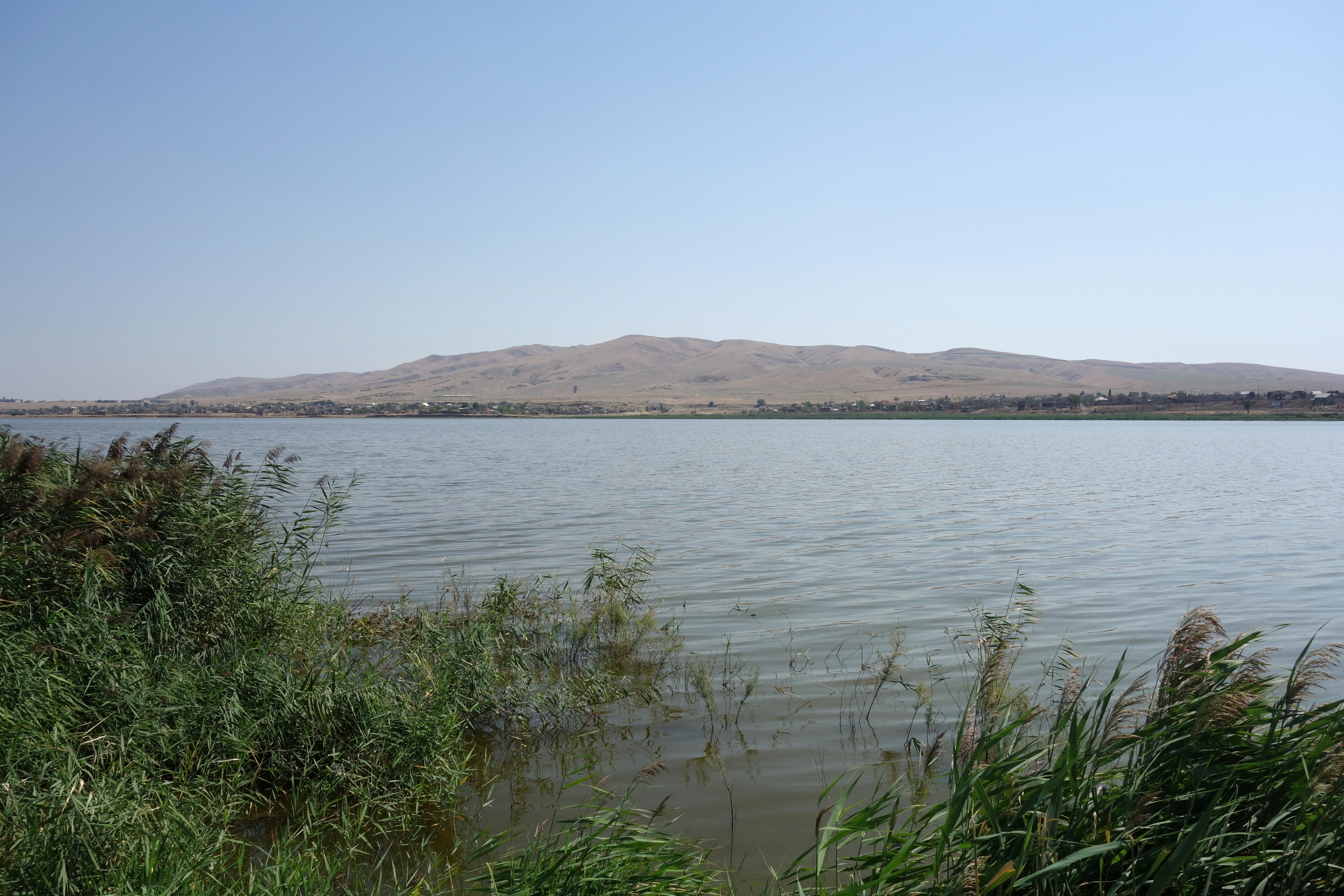

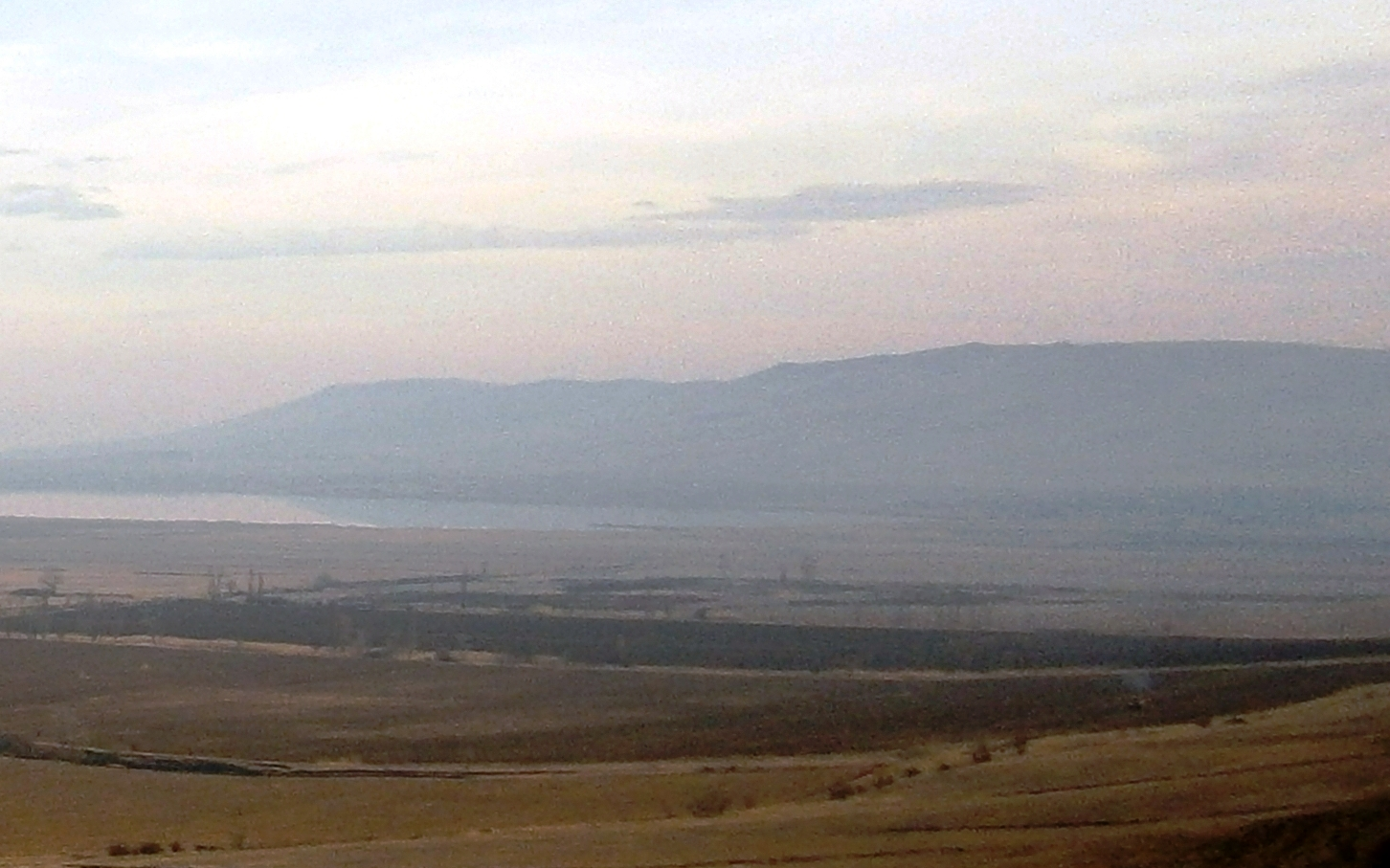

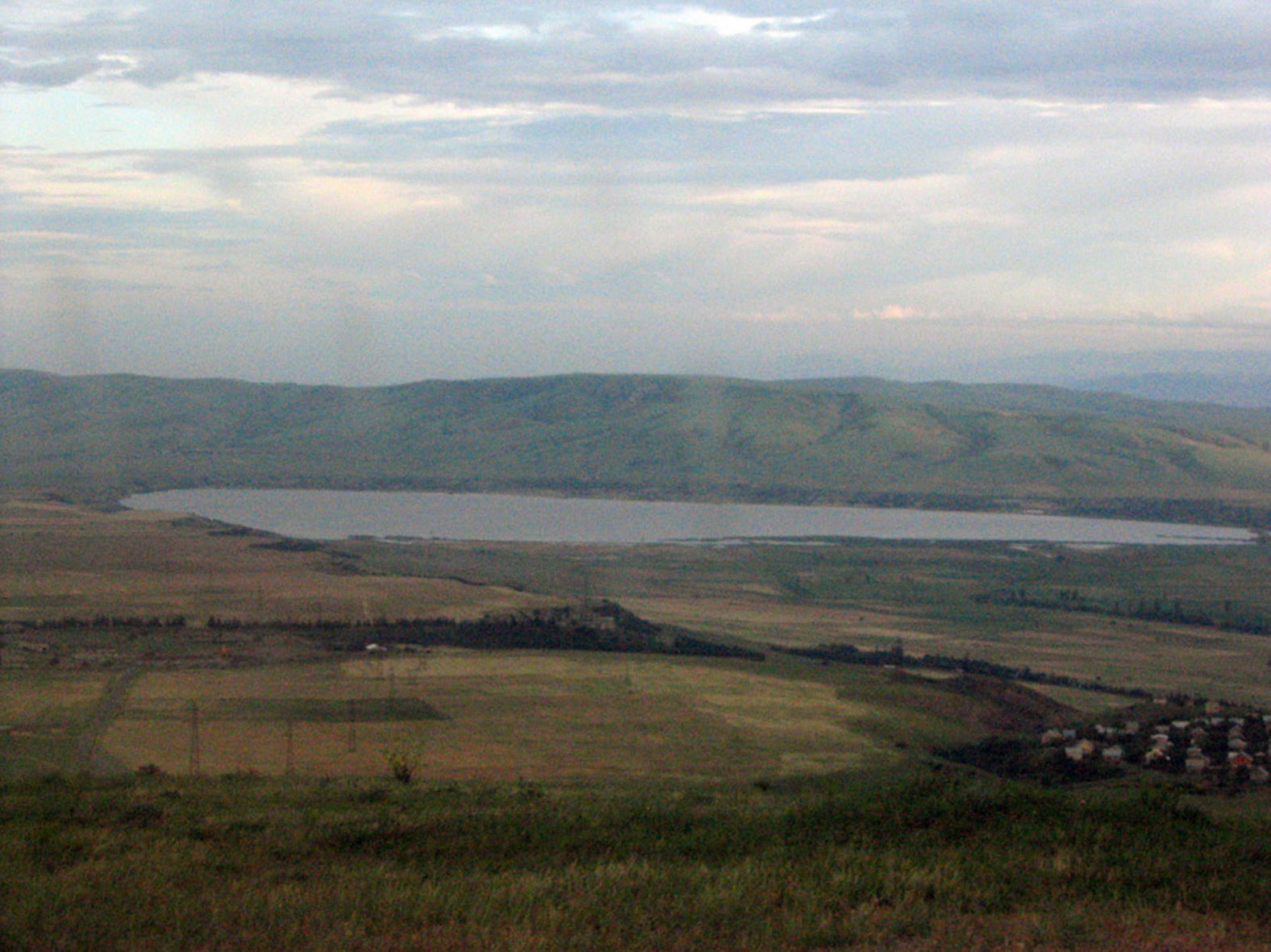
