= Soyun Sadykov =

Russian politician (born 1960)

Soyun Kasumovich Sadykov
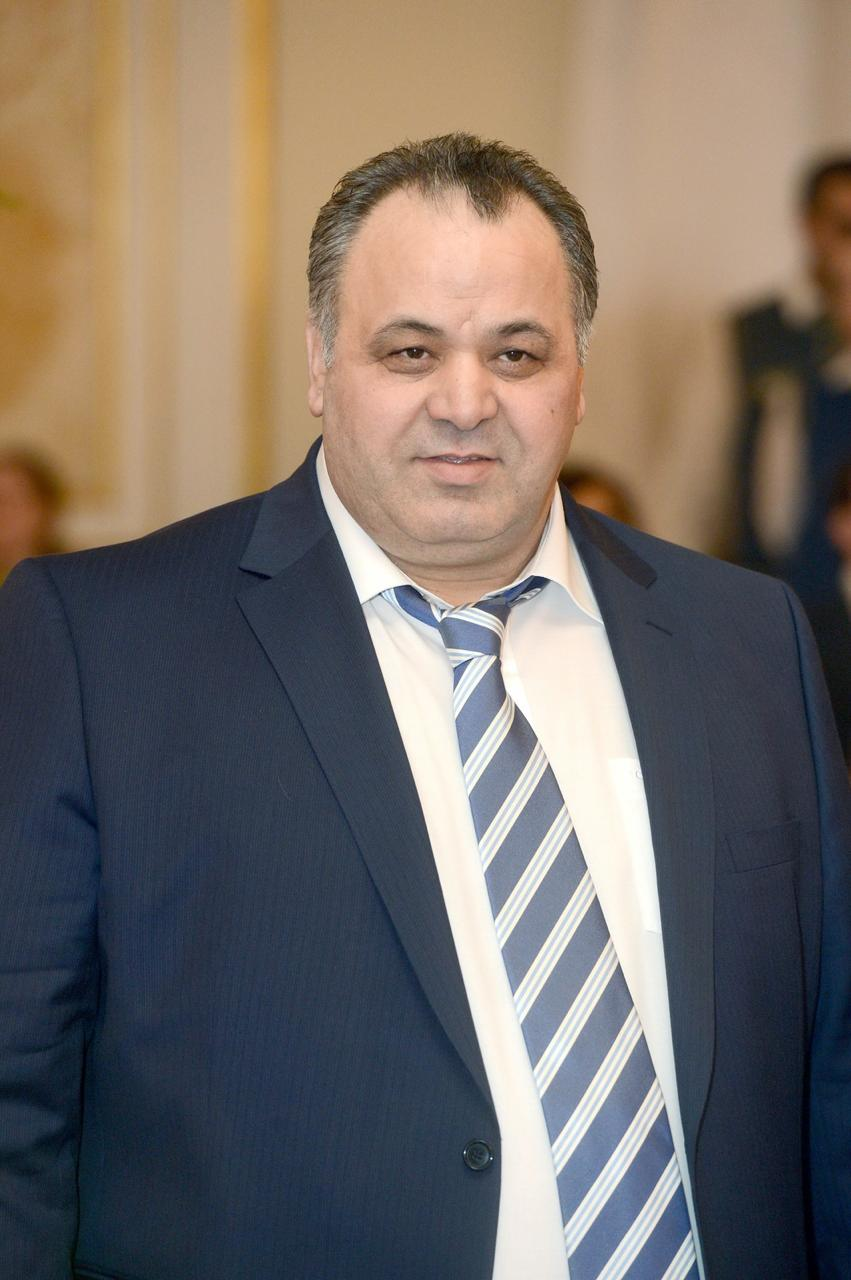

Personal details
- Born: 5 March 1960 (age 66) Gardabani, Georgian SSR, Soviet Union
- Education: Higher KGB School named after F.E.Dzerzhinsky,
- Occupation: Politician
- Profession: Economist
- Awards: Taraggi Medal
- Website: https://msr.center/team/president/

Military service
- Allegiance: Soviet Union (Russia) Russian Federation
- Rank: Starshina

Soyun Kasumovich Sadykov (Russian: Союн Касумович Садыков, Azerbaijani: Soyun Kasum oğlu Sadıqov, Georgian: სოიუნ კასუმის ძე სადიკოვი; born 5 March 1960 in Gardabani, USSR) is a Russian politician, public figure and statesman, and former sambo martial artist.

Sadykov is a Master of Sports, a USSR sambo champion and a prize-winner of European Sambo Championships. He headed the Federal National Cultural Autonomy of Azerbaijanis in Russia (FNCA AZERROS). Sadykov is the President of the "Strategic Development Modeling Center " and an authorized representative of Russian President Vladimir Putin in the elections from 2012 to 2018.

== Early life ==
Soyun Sadykov was born in 1960 in Gardabani, Georgian SSR. He studied at Gardabani Secondary School from 1967 to 1977, where he learned sambo. He moved to Moscow after leaving school as a member of the USSR national team. He earned a PhD in Economics.

Sadykov served in the Soviet Army from 1978 to 1980. In 1980 he graduated from the Higher KGB School named after F.E. Dzerzhinsky. He worked in KGB from 1980 to 1981. Sadykov was a foreman, a head of construction department No. 210 under the KGB and a manager of a construction trust in 1981–2000.

== Assassination attempt ==
On 18 March 2005, Sadykov was fired on by an assailant with a machine gun on Khavskaya Street in Moscow while driving.

== Career ==
In 2008 Soyun Sadykov became head of the Strategic Development Modeling Center, which engages in geopolitical research.

=== Politics ===
Sadykov actively opposed the recruitment of Azerbaijanis into the ranks of Chechen fighters during the First and Second Chechen War.

In 2012, Sadykov became Putin's confidant during his election campaign and after his victory joined the Council on Interethnic Relations. Sadykov is the author of administrative reform to enlarge the regions of the Russian Federation. He fought for the rights of emigrants and national minorities.

On 25 January 2013 at the V Congress of the Federal National Cultural Autonomy of Azerbaijanis in Russia, he was elected honorary president of that organization.

In February 2013 he organized the creation of the Borgia party in Georgia. The aim of the party was to protect the rights of Azerbaijanis in Georgia, as well as to achieve the autonomy of Kvemo-Kartli

In December 2014 he proposed holding the World Congress of Crimean Tatars in Moscow and the Crimean Development Fund was established in Ankara with his help.

Sadykov aided the reconciliation between Russia and Turkey after the conflict over a Russian plane shot down in Turkey. He helps the War and Labor Veterans Council of the Danilovsky District of the Southern Administrative District of Moscow, the Russian community of Azerbaijan and a Russian-language school in Ganja, Azerbaijan.

== Sport ==
Soyun Sadykov is a USSR master of sports. He was the sambo champion of the Soviet Union in 1978 and a prize-winner of European sambo championships in 1979 and 1980. Seriously injured, Soyun then retired from sports. He is a vice president of the Combat Sambo Federation of Russia since 2005.

== Books ==
- S.K. Sadykov The Construction Economics in the Market Period (1990)
- S.K. Sadykov Russia is not a chess board: is the proposed alternative in tandem proper? Russia is power 25 October 2011.
