= Martkopi =

Martkopi მარტყოფი
- Village
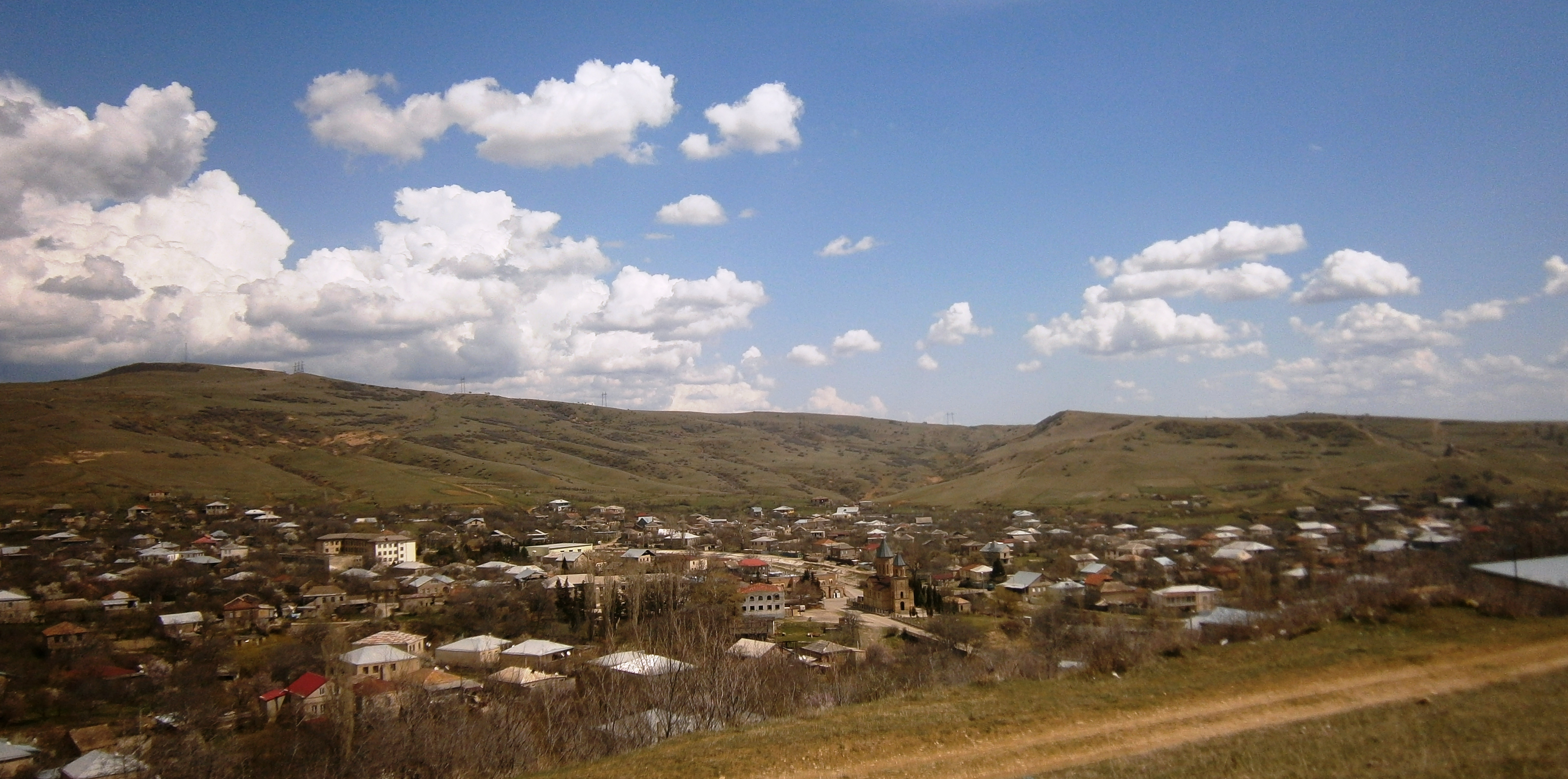
- View of the village
- Interactive map of Martkopi
- Location within Georgia Location within Kvemo Kartli
- Coordinates: 41°47′11″N 45°01′20″E
- Country: Georgia
- Mkhare: Kvemo Kartli
- Municipality: Gardabani
- Elevation: 700 m (2,300 ft)

Population (2014)
  - Total: 7,397
- Time zone: UTC+4 (Georgian Time)

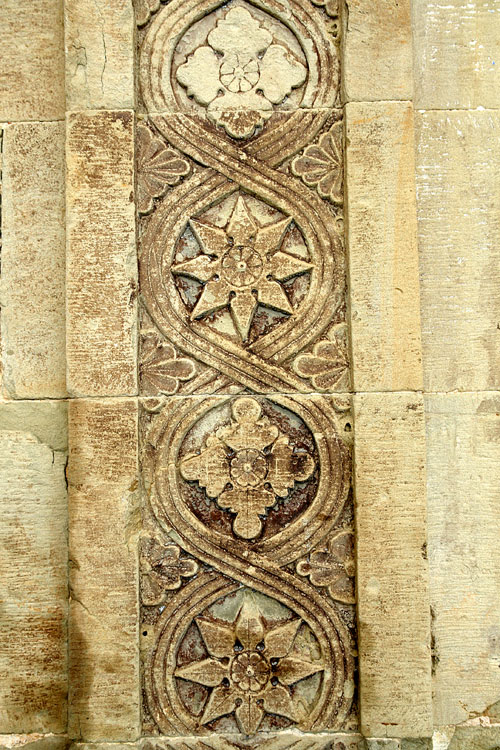
Stone carving from Monastery of St Anton of Martkopi

Martkopi (Georgian: მარტყოფი) is a village in Gardabani Municipality of Georgia. It is located on the left side of Ialno range, in the gorges of the rivers Alikhevi and Tevali, and is at an altitude of 770 meters. It is 55 kilometers from Gardabani and 12 kilometers from Vaziani (the nearest railway station). According to the 2014 census, the village is populated by 7397 residents.

The region of Martkopi played a big role during the third millennium BC. It is distinguished by many rich burial Kurgans, representing the early stage of the Early Kurgan culture of Central Transcaucasia.

In 1625, Martkopi was a battlefield for a military confrontation between the Georgian Kingdom of Kartli and Safavid Iran. The Georgians, led by General Giorgi Saakadze, annihilated an Iranian detachment of Abbas the Great.

== History ==
Martkopi territory was inhabited from the 1st to the 2nd century. Till the 6th century, its name was Akriani. It is considered that the name “Martkopi” comes from one of the Thirteen Assyrian Fathers – Anton Martqopeli (martomkopeli in Georgian means someone who is living alone). A cathedral was established at the older monastery in the 13th century, which since the 15th century became a center of Sadrosho (an administrative unit in feudal Georgia mainly used for army mobilizing). In 1625 in Martkopi a military confrontation took place between Georgia and Iran.

In addition, Martkopi served as a cultural center too. The names of the famous Georgian poets and writers Nikolos Cherkesishvili (17th-18th century), Ioan Khobulashvili (18th century), Stefane Djorjadze (18th century), and others are associated with the village.

Precious Parthian coins (100 BC-200 AD) were found in the territory of the village.

In Martkopi ruins of the cupola church are still preserved. It was built in 1810 by the bishop of Rustavi Stefane II. Some other family castles from the 18th century can also be found here. Near the village is Ghvtaeba monastery complex dating back to the 5th—6th centuries.

== Bronze age ==
Close to the village in the Ulevari Valley archaeologists discovered bronze-age graves.

=== Martkopi Kurgans ===
Several rich burials Kurgans have been discovered in the area. They represent the early stage of the Early Kurgan culture of Central Transcaucasia. The Martkopi Culture may be dated before 2550 BC.

This Early Kurgan period, known as Martkopi-Bedeni, has been interpreted as a transitional phase and the first stage of the Middle Bronze Age.

The earliest group belongs to the Kurgans or barrows of the Martkopi/Ulevari and Samgori valleys (east of Tbilisi), and the earliest among the Trialeti culture.

The somewhat later Kurgans are of the Bedeni type. They are represented by the Kurgans of the Bedeni plateau (near Trialeti), and also those of the Alazani valley (in Kakheti, eastern part of East Georgia).

This stage of the Early Bronze Age seems to represent the final stage of the Kura–Araxes culture. According to recent dating, the transition to the Early Kurgan period was around the mid of the 3rd millennium -- somewhat between the 27th to 24th century BC.

=== Metalwork ===
There appears to be a new abundance of metals in this period. Arsenical coppers were dominating the record, while copper and tin-bronzes were represented to a rather limited degree.

The launch of tin bronze production in South Caucasia is associated with the appearance of the so-called Early Kurgans, whereas artifacts of the Kura-Araxes (Early Transcaucasian) culture were made exclusively of copper-arsenic alloy.

== See also ==
- Battle of Martkopi
- Kvemo Kartli

== Sources ==
- (in Georgian) Matiashvili A., Menabde L., Sagharadze Sh., GSE, (1983) volume 6, page 462, Tbilisi.
