= Gardabani =

Gardabani გარდაბანი
- City
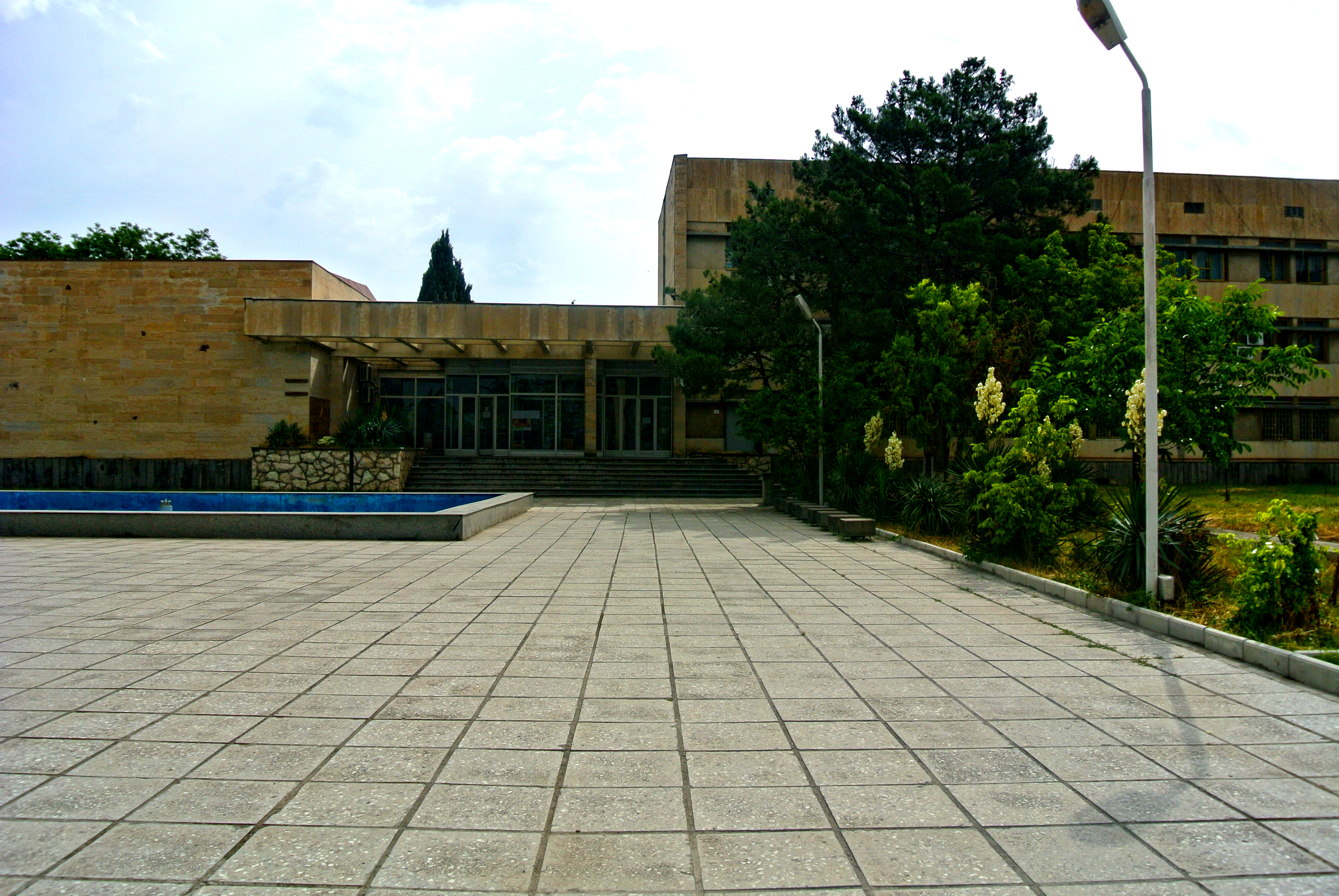
- Building of the Gardabani Municipality
- Interactive map of Gardabani
- Location within Georgia Location within Kvemo Kartli
- Coordinates: 41°27′39″N 45°05′22″E
- Country: Georgia
- Mkhare: Kvemo Kartli
- Municipality: Gardabani
- Elevation: 300 m (980 ft)

Population (January 1, 2024)
  - Total: 12,061
- Time zone: UTC+4 (Georgian Time)
- Website: gardabani.gov.ge

Gardabani (Georgian: გარდაბანი) is a city of 11,650 residents (2021) in the valley or plain of the same name, in the southern Georgian region of Kvemo Kartli and is the administrative centre of the Gardabani Municipality. It is located 34 kilometres (21 mi) southeast of capital Tbilisi and 10 kilometres (6.2 mi) from Rustavi in the Kvemo Kartli Plain at an elevation of 300 metres (980 ft) above sea level. Until 1947 Gardabani was known as Karayazi (Azerbaijani: Qarayazı) and the city status was granted in 1969, after a thermal power plant was built for Tbilisi in the 1960s causing rapid growth. Since then more plower plants have been built and the city nowadays supplies almost all thermally generated electricity in the country.

== History ==
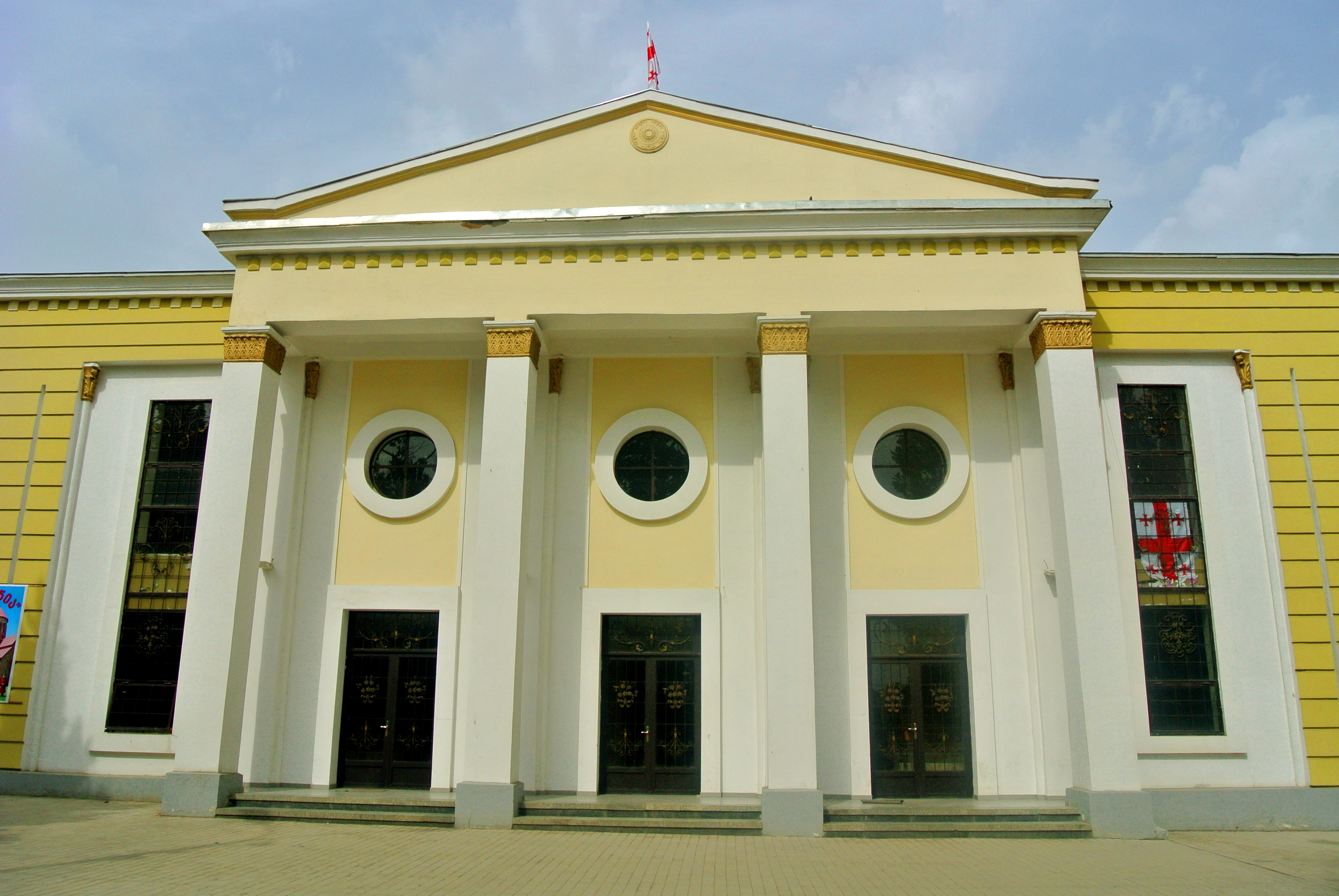
Cultural Center

Gardabani was an inconspicuous village in the southern Georgian countryside until Russian rule in the 19th century. With the administrative division of the South Caucasus by the Russians, the settlement, at the time with the Azerbaijani name Karayaz(i) (Azerbaijani: Qarayazı, Russian: Караязы, often spelled Karaia in Georgian; also known under the Russian exonym Karatapa, Russian: Кара-тапа, Georgian: ყარატაფა, Azerbaijani: Qaratəpə), became the namesake and center of Karayaz uchastok (Russian: Караязский участок) within the Tiflis Uyezd (part of Tiflis Governorate). Karayazi was mainly populated by Azerbaijanis, who at the time were referred to as Tatars like other Turkic-speaking ethnic groups. In 1886, 94% of the more than 5,000 residents of Karayazi uchastok were of Azerbaijani descent. Upon completion of the Tiflis - Baku railway line in 1883 a station opened in Karayaz.

Karayazi was on the main attack route from Azerbaijan during the Soviet invasion of the Democratic Republic of Georgia in February 1921, when it attempted to pass armored trains along Karayazi to Tiflis. By the end of February the Soviets captured Tiflis and soon incorporated Georgia as the Georgian SSR. In 1938 the Karayazi raion was separated from the Tiflis Okrug, making the village of Karayazi the administrative center of the new raion. In 1947 the name was changed from Karayazi to Gardabani, and in 1969 city rights were granted. With the local governance reforms in 2006 all raions were converted to municipalities and Gardabani remained the administrative center of the transformed municipality.

== Etymology ==
The name "Gardabani" (Georgian: გარდაბანი) is believed to have Persian origins. The term "Gardaban" (Persian: گردابان) can be broken down into "Gard" (گرد), meaning "whirlpool" or "swirl," and "Aban" (آبان), meaning "of water" or "water-related." This suggests the name originally referred to a whirlpool or swirling water, possibly reflecting the local geography and presence of water bodies. Over time, the name was adapted into Georgian as "Gardabani," becoming part of the local lexicon. The region's name thus reflects its historical and cultural ties, influenced by Persian, Azerbaijani, and Georgian interactions over centuries.

== Geography ==
Gardabani is a city located in south-eastern Georgia, within the Kvemo Kartli region. It is situated on the Gardabani Plain (გარდაბნის ვაკე), a flat and expansive lowland area that stretches along the eastern part of the country, close to the border with Azerbaijan. The plain is characterized by semi-arid landscapes and is part of the larger Transcaucasian Depression, which includes various lowlands and plains across the South Caucasus region.

Gardabani's proximity to the capital of Tbilisi makes it strategically important. The city lies along the banks of the Mtkvari (Kura) River, one of the major rivers in the South Caucasus, which supports local agriculture through irrigation. The region's climate is continental, with hot summers and mild winters, making it suitable for agricultural activities such as grain and vegetable farming.

== Population ==
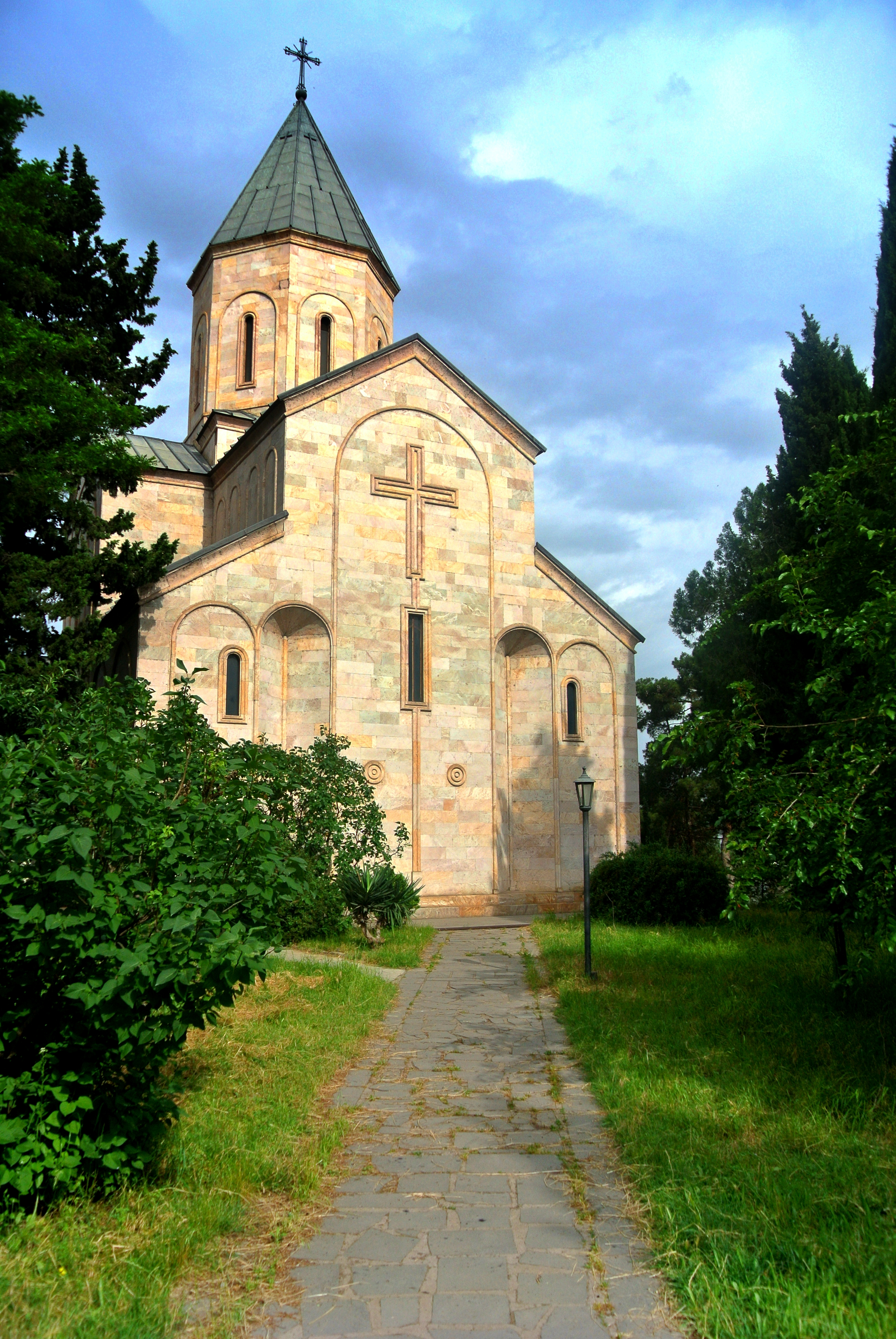
Gardabani church

At the beginning of 2021, Gardabani had a population of 11,650, an increase of more than 8% since the 2014 census. According to the 2014 census, the ethnic composition is 63% Azerbaijanis, followed by 30% Georgians. Almost all Assyrians in the municipality live in Gardabani city (almost 300, 2.5%). Other minorities are Armenians (1.9%), Russians (1.4%) and a few dozen Ukrainians, Ossetians and Pontic Greeks.

In 1979, 49% of the city's residents were of Azerbaijani origin, while the proportion of Georgians was 17%. At the time, more Russians (15%), Armenians (5%) and Greeks (4%) lived in the city, who mostly emigrated with the dissolution of the Soviet Union.

Year	1897	1923	1939 (Note: Until 1947 Gardabani was called Karayaz(i) (Russian: Караязы))	1959	1970	1979	1989	2002	2014	2021	2023
Population	-	904	▲1,846	-	▲9,131	▲13,661	▲17,176	▼11,858	▼10,753	▲11,650	▲12045
Data: Population statistics Georgia 1897 to present. Note: (Note: The 2014 census found an inexplicable gap with the data from the national statistical office Geostat. UN-assisted research has found the 2002 census was inflated by about 8-9 percent. See, "1. Introduction", Page 1.)

=== German settlements ===
The Gardabani area, along with other parts of Georgia, saw a significant settlement of German immigrants in the late 19th century. These German settlers were part of a broader wave of German migration to the Russian Empire during the 19th century, driven by various economic, religious, and political factors. The German settlers who came to the Gardabani area were primarily Swabian Lutherans from the Württemberg region in southwestern Germany. They were invited by the Russian Empire, which then ruled over Georgia, as part of a strategy to develop and modernize agricultural lands and promote settlement in the sparsely populated areas of the empire. These settlers established several colonies throughout Georgia, particularly in areas like Kvemo Kartli, where Gardabani is located. One of the notable German colonies was Katharinenfeld (now Bolnisi), not far from Gardabani, and it became a center for German culture and farming in the region.

The German settlers brought with them advanced agricultural techniques, which helped to develop the fertile plains of Gardabani. They cultivated vineyards, orchards, and other crops, significantly impacting the region's agricultural landscape. The influence of German culture, architecture, and community life persisted for many decades.

The presence of Germans in the region continued until Stalin's rise to power. Stalin's government perceived the ethnic Germans as a potential threat due to their German origins. As a result, many German settlers in Georgia and across the Soviet Union were deported to Central Asia and Siberia, effectively ending the German communities in Georgia.

=== Assyrians ===
A relatively large Assyrian community lives in Gardabani. After the Assyrian genocide in 1915, survivors from the Anatolian region of Bohtan fled to the Russian Empire via Yerevan and eventually, after the revolutions and wars of that period, settled ina few villages in the Azerbaijan SSR. However, they never became Soviet citizens, and were deported to Siberia in 1949 where they lived in exile until 1956. The Assyrians who had been deported from the Azerbaijan town Ağstafa were not allowed to return by its residents, so they ended up in Gardabani.

== Economy ==
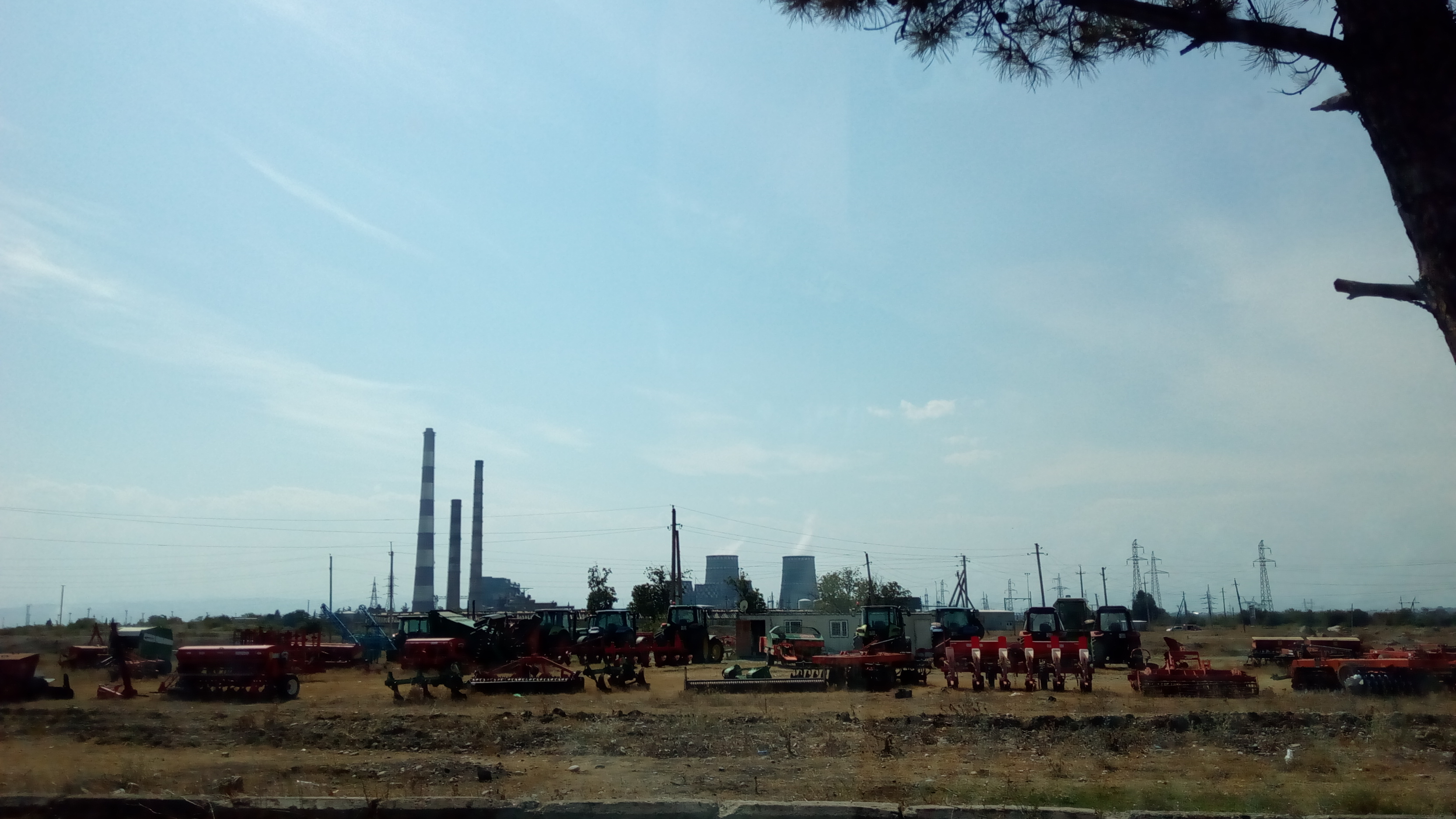
Georgia's thermal power hub

Gardabani is the center of thermal electricity production in Georgia, after the city was selected in the 1960s as the site for the Tbilisi thermal power plant (Tibilisskaja GRES), which was built 3 kilometres (1.9 mi) west of the city. Since then, more plants have been built, and currently the site hosts several gas- and coal-fired power stations that are responsible for almost all thermal electricity production in Georgia. After the 2003 Rose Revolution, efforts were made to expand electricity production for greater energy independence, but also to cope with the energy crisis that plagued the country for years. In 2006 a gas-fired power plant with a capacity of 110 MW opened in Gardabani, the first new power plant since the country's independence.

Since 2012, a further step-by-step investment in the country's energy independence was launched with the construction of new combined cycle power plants in Gardabani. Hydroelectric power plants are responsible for 75-80% of the electricity production in the mountainous country, some of which is seasonal, but additional imports were still required in addition to thermal power production. In addition, energy consumption in the country is increasing and outdated (hydropower) plants are not efficient enough.

In 2015, Georgia's first combined cycle power plant, the 230 MW Gardabani-1, opened. At the beginning of 2020, Gardabani-2 combined cycle power plant of 230 MW followed. In September 2020, the construction of the 272 MW Gardabani-3 combined cycle power plant was announced, and a year later the 250 MW Gardabani-4 combined cycle power plant.

In 2005, a pumping station for the Baku–Tbilisi–Ceyhan pipeline opened near Gardabani, completing the Georgian sector of the pipeline. Presidents Mikheil Saakashvili (Georgia), Ilham Aliyev (Azerbaijan) and Ahmet Sezer (Turkey) attended the inauguration.

== Transport ==
Only one national route passes through Gardabani, the Sh66. This is a connection from Rustavi via Gardabani to the Vakhtangisi border crossing with Azerbaijan. With just over 69,000 foreign travelers in 2019, this is a secondary border crossing.

The Tbilisi - Baku railway line which opened in 1883 has a station on the outskirts of Gardabani. It serves as a border station for the scheduled Tbilisi - Baku connection.

== Born in Gardabani ==
- Soyun Sadykov (1960), Russian politician, headed Federal National Cultural Autonomy of Azerbaijanis in Russia, confidante Vladimir Putin;
- Gocha Jamarauli (1971), soccerplayer;
- Ilgar Mirzayev (1973-2020), Azerbaijani military officer, National Hero of Azerbaijan, and colonel serving Azerbaijani Armed Forces until his death during July 2020 Armenian–Azerbaijani clashes;
- Giorgi Matiashvili (1977), Georgian major general and Chief of Georgian Defense Forces (2020-);
- Zabit Samedov (1984), kickboxer;
- Chingiz Allazov (1993), kickboxer.
- Seimur Nasibov (2006), boxer;
- Elnur Abdulaevi (2007), boxer;

== See also ==
Media related to Gardabani at Wikimedia Commons

- List of power stations in Georgia (country)
- Baku–Tbilisi–Kars railway
