= Martkopi Monastery =

Monastery in Martkopi, Georgia

- მარტყოფის მონასტერი
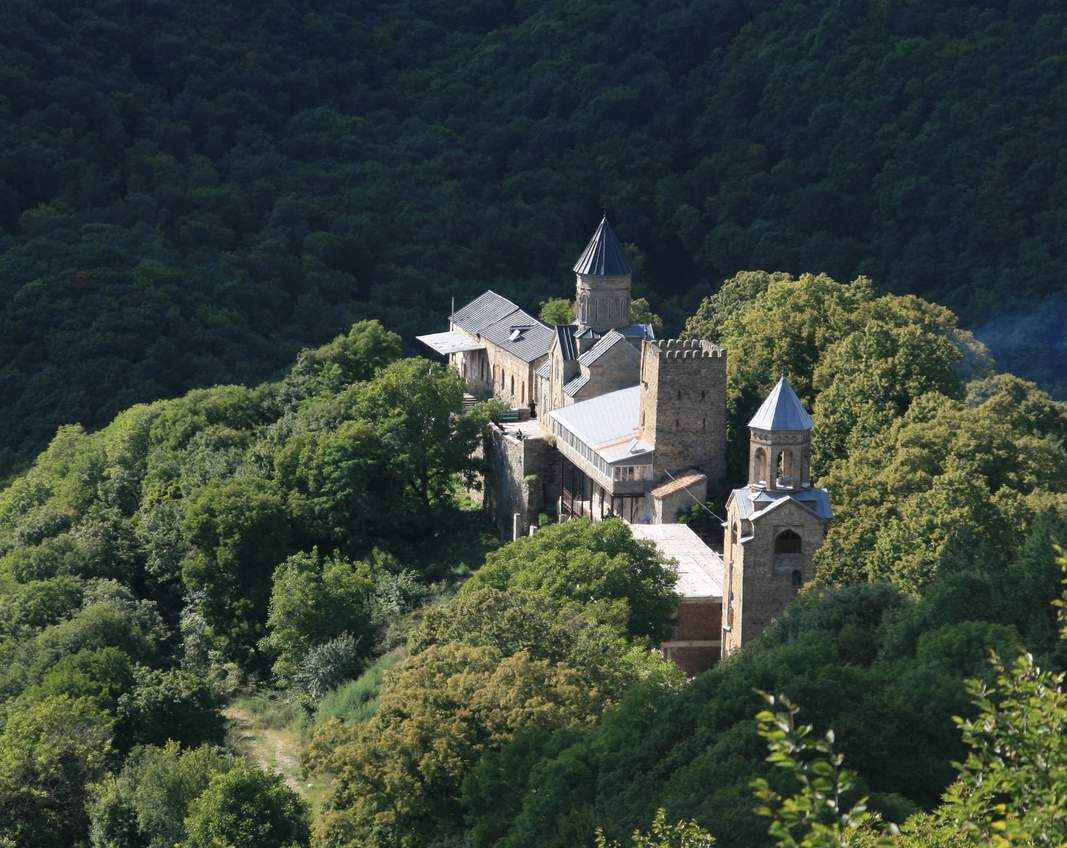
- Martkopi Monastery as seen from St. Anton's Pillar
- Interactive map of Martkopi Monastery
- Location: Martkopi, Gardabani Municipality, Kvemo Kartli, Georgia
- Coordinates: 41.827498°N 44.968135°E
- Type: Monastery complex

The Martkopi Monastery of the Deity (Georgian: მარტყოფის ღვთაების მონასტერი, romanized: mart'q'opis ghvtaebis monast'eri) is a Georgian Orthodox monastery near the village of Martkopi, some 25 km east of Tbilisi, the capital of Georgia. The history of the monastery dates back to stylite practices in the 6th century and is linked by historical tradition with St. Anton, one of the Thirteen Assyrian Fathers. Most of the monastery's extant structures are from the 17th to the 19th century. The monastery is inscribed on the list of the Immovable Cultural Monuments of National Significance of Georgia.

== Overview ==
The monastery complex is situated 5 km northwest of the archaeologically important village of Martkopi, Gardabani Municipality, Kvemo Kartli, some 25 km east of Tbilisi, on the wooded southern slopes of the Ialno Range. The current complex consists of the main dome church, a bell-tower, the Monk Anton's Pillar, and various other structures.

The main church was completely rebuilt in the mid-19th century to replace the older, medieval ruined edifice. To the north of it stands a bell-tower, constructed by the certain Akhverda in 1699 as identified by a Georgian inscription on its wall. Architecturally it is similar to other contemporaneous bell-towers in Georgia, such as those at Ninotsminda, Urbnisi, and Anchiskhati, with some Persianate flavor. Further to the east, on a hilltop, there is a tower overlooking the monastery and rising to the height of 30 metres. Known as the Monk Anton's Pillar, it is believed to have served as a stylite hermitage in the last 15 years of the monk's life. The extant structure was built upon the ruined early medieval stone column.

== History ==
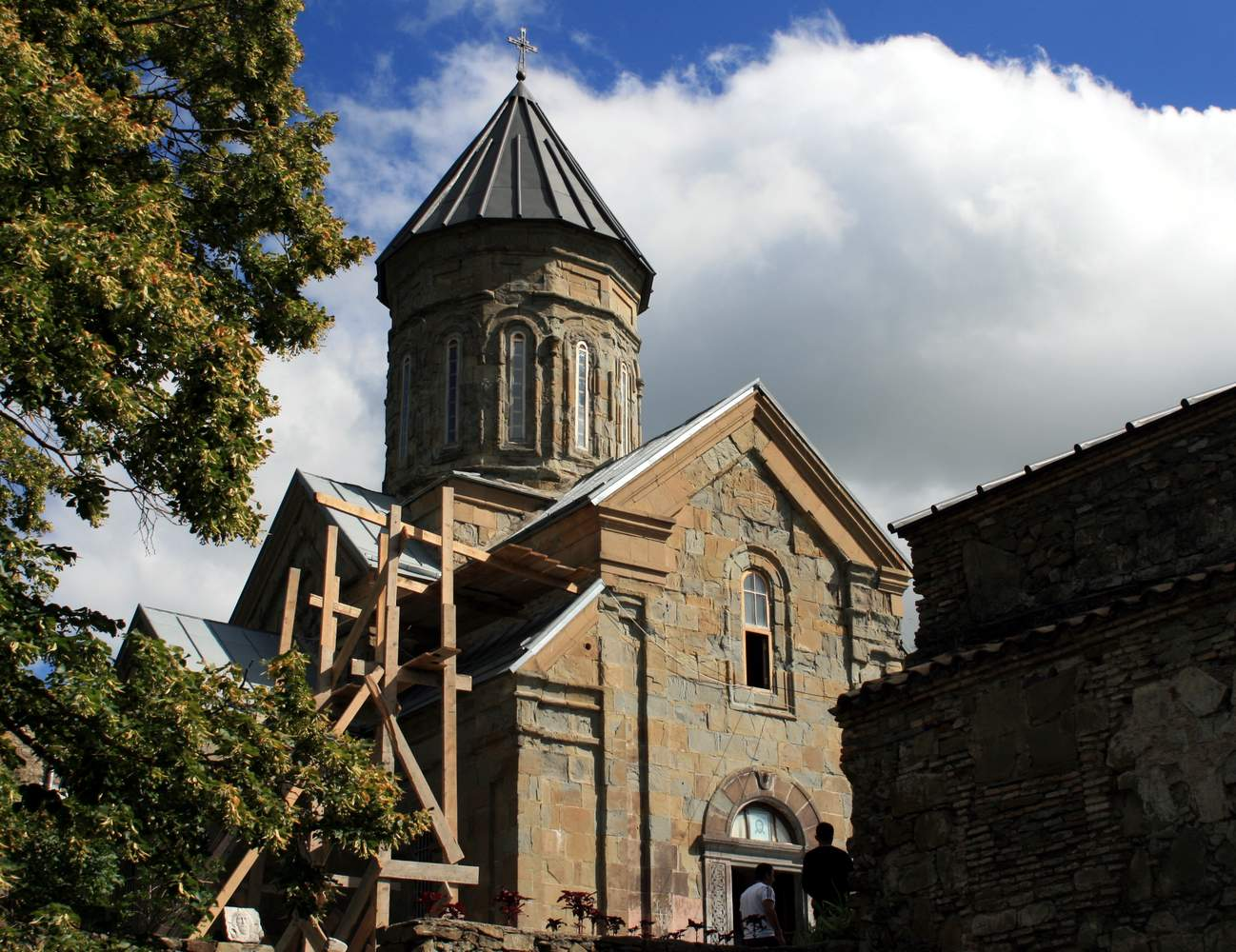
The Martkopi church of the Deity

The Martkopi bell-tower

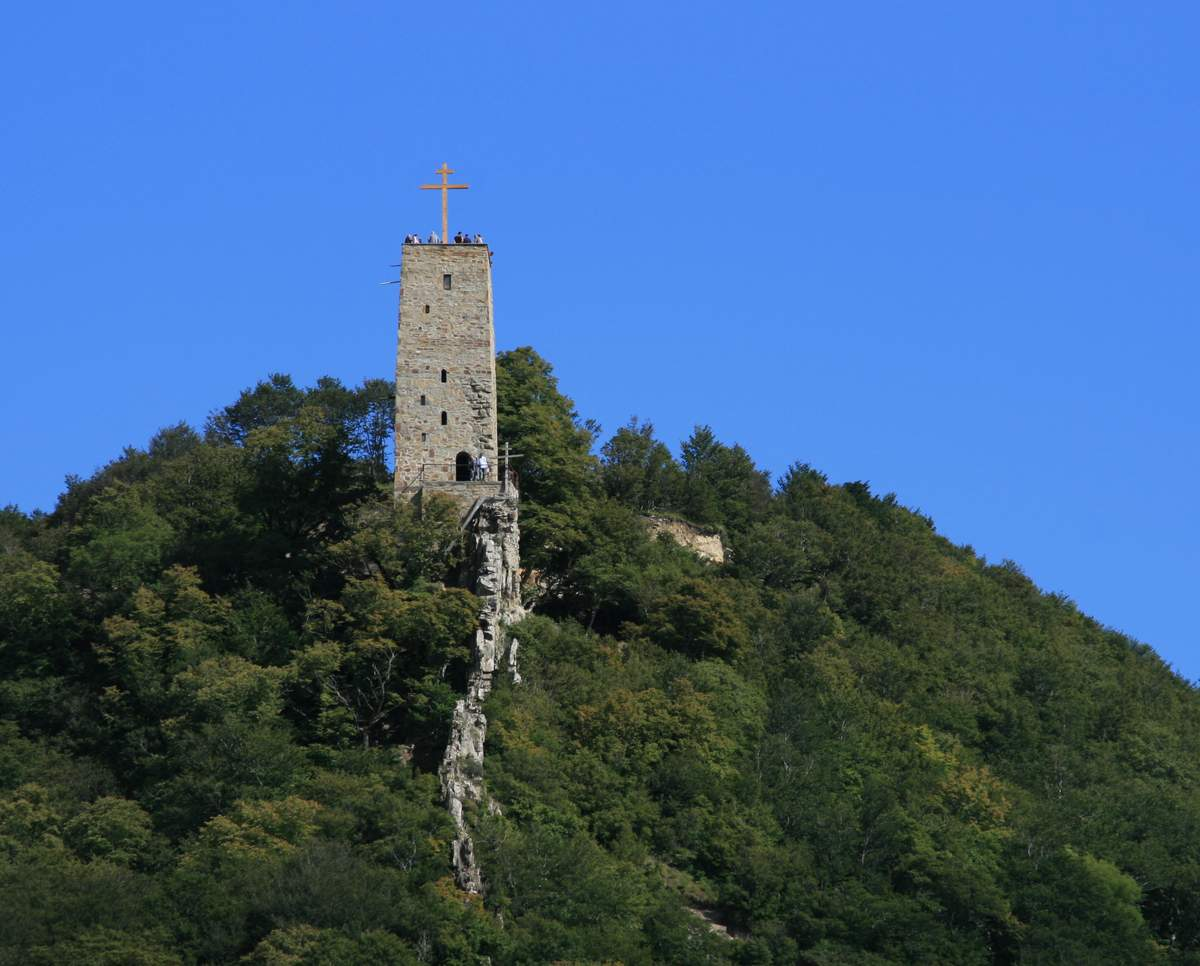
St. Anton's Pillar

The foundation of the Martkopi Monastery is associated in medieval Georgian tradition—elaborated in the hymns by the 13th-century cleric Arsen Bulmaisimisdze—with the monk Anton who is said to have arrived in Georgia from Edessa in Upper Mesopotamia around 545. The toponym Martkopi is derived from the Georgian epithet of St. Anton, Martodmqopeli (literally, "one who lives in solitude"), "a hermit", while naming the church after the Deity is a reference to the acheiropoietic icon of the Redeemer, reportedly brought by Anton from Edessa.

In 1265, the Martkopi Monastery became the seat of the bishop of Rustavi after that city was destroyed in an invasion by Berke, ruler of the Mongol Golden Horde. The monastery was looted during the Georgian campaigns of the Turco-Mongol emir Timur in 1395. In the late 17th century, it was substantially renovated. The monastery was fortified—"like a fortress" as reported by the 18th-century Georgian scholar Prince Vakhushti of Kartli. Its wall had a total length of 1,400 m and was equipped with firing ports.

The monastery enjoyed favor of the kings of the eastern Georgian kingdom of Kakheti, to whose country Martkopi belonged after the dissolution of the Kingdom of Georgia in the late 15th century. In one episode, after the Persian-Georgian forces defeated the Ottoman troops in 1735, the monastery hosted the visit of Nader Shah, accompanied by his Georgian allies, Princes Teimuraz II and Erekle; Nader donated some money and presents to the Christian monastery.

In 1752, wary of the marauding Lesgian inroads, the bishop Ioseb Jandierishvili felt compelled to abandon the monastery and transfer his residence and parish within the better protected village of Martkopi. The church building was significantly damaged in an earthquake in 1823; its dome and eastern wall collapsed. Of the church the 19th-century French historian Marie-Félicité Brosset remarked that nothing remained but the wall.

In his 1847 description of Martkopi—the first scholarly treatment of the monument—Platon Ioseliani reported that the ruined church still contained frescoes, including the full-length portraits of the Georgian kings Vakhtang Gorgasali and David the Builder, with identifying Georgian texts, and Greek-Russian inscriptions commemorating the Muscovite embassy to Kakheti in 1586.

The main church building was rebuilt between 1848 and 1855 and the Russian painter Mikhail Troshchinsky was employed to fresco the interior in 1856. In the process old Georgian murals and multilingual inscriptions were lost; a chamber discovered in the northern portion of the church was identified as the burial ground of St. Anton.

On 26 August 1918, the Martkopi convent became the scene of the murder of Kyrion II, Catholicos-Patriarch of All Georgia, who was found shot in his own cell in unclear circumstances. The monastery remained active until 1934, when it was closed down by the Soviet authorities; the church building was converted into an orphanage and later into a recreational facility for the Tbilisi-based 31st Aviation Factory employees. In 1989, the monastery was restored to the Georgian Orthodox Church.
