= Gardabani Municipality =

Coordinates: 41°27′N 45°06′E

Gardabani Municipality გარდაბნის მუნიციპალიტეტი
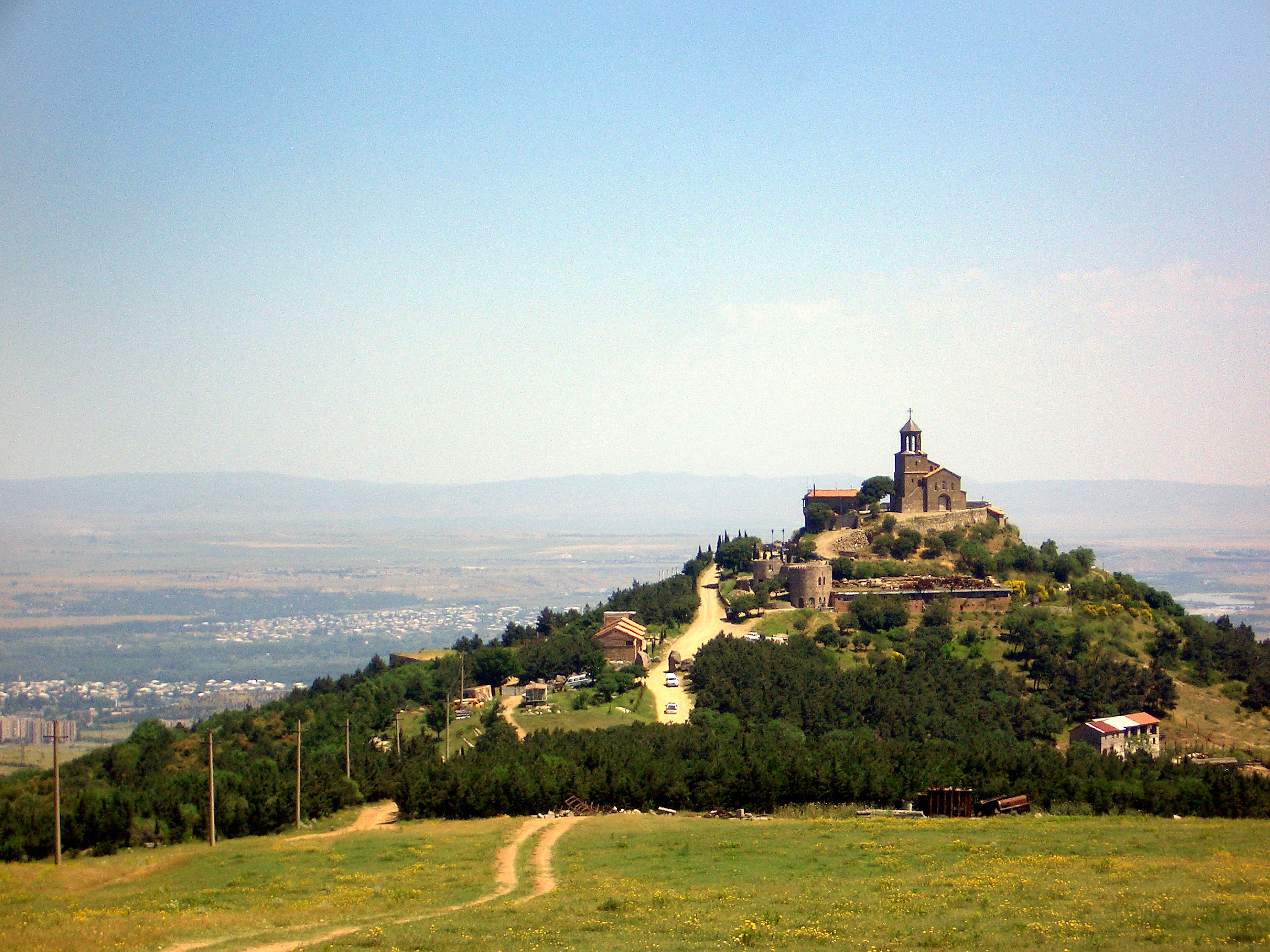
- Shavnabada

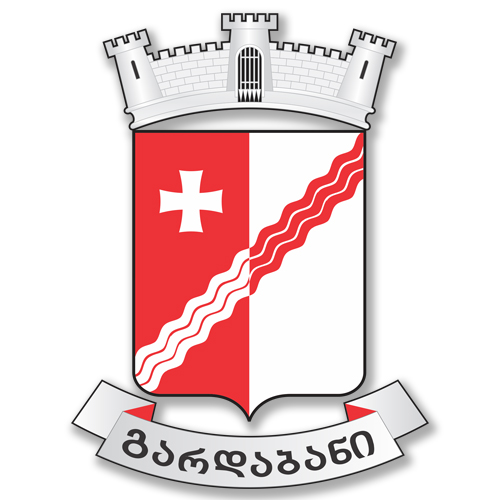
- Flag Seal

- Interactive map of Gardabani Municipality
- Country: Georgia
- Mkhare: Kvemo Kartli
- Administrative centre: Gardabani

Government
  - Type: Mayor–Council
  - Body: Gardabani Municipal Assembly
  - Mayor: Davit Kargareteli (GD)

Area
  - Total: 1,212.2 km^{2} (468.0 sq mi)

Population (2021)
  - Total: 80,329
  - Density: 66.267/km^{2} (171.63/sq mi)

Population by ethnicity
  - Georgians: 54,2 %
  - Azerbaijanis: 43,5 %
  - Armenians: 0,7 %
  - Russians: 0,5 %
  - Assyrians: 0,3 %
- Time zone: UTC+4 (Georgian Time)
- Website: gardabani.gov.ge

Gardabani (Georgian: გარდაბნის მუნიციპალიტეტი, Gardabnis Municiṕaliťeťi) is a municipality in Georgia's southern region Kvemo Kartli. It covers an area of 1,212.2 km^{2} (468 sq mi). As of 2021 it had a population of 80,329 people. The city of Gardabani is its administrative centre.

== Modern History ==
After the annexation of the Kingdom of Kartli-Kakheti by the Russian Empire in 1801, the area of modern Gardabani administratively became part of the Tiflis Uyezd, which itself was part of the successive governates Georgia Governorate, Georgia-Imeretia Governorate and finally between 1846 and 1917 the Tiflis Governorate. Within the Tiflis Uyezd, present day Gardabani was located in the western half of the administrative uchastoks Karayaz (Караязский участок) and Sartachal (Сартачальский участок). The southern part (Karayaz) was mainly inhabited by Azerbaijanis, who at the time were referred to as Tatars like other Turkic-speaking ethnic groups.

In the 1918 elections in the Tiflis Mazra of the Democratic Republic of Georgia, Peri-Khan Sofiyeva from the village of Karajala (also known as Karajalari) was elected council member for the Karajaz district. According to historians, she was the first Muslim woman in the world to get elected through democratic elections, with universal suffrage.

Karayaz was situated on one of the main routes of the Red Army from Azerbaijan during the Soviet invasion of Georgia in February 1921, mainly due to the Baku - Tiflis railway line through the district and the Soviet use of armored trains. The Soviets came out on top at the end of February, and annexed the fledgling republic as the Georgian SSR. The area of Gardabani initially remained in the Tiflis Okrug with the administrative reorganization of the Georgian SSR around 1930, but in 1938 the Karayaz Raion was separated from the Tiflis Okrug. The village of Karayaz(i) (Russian: Караязы; also Karatapa, Russian: Кара-тапа, Georgian: ყარატაფა, Azerbaijani: Qaratəpə) became the administrative center of the raion. Azerbaijanis were in the numerical majority in the new raion (68%).

In 1947 the name of the raion and the administrative center was changed to Gardabani. In 1969 the village of Gardabani received city status. After the collapse of the Soviet Union and Georgia's independence, economic conditions declined in the country, but the municipality generally managed to escape the great wave of emigration of the 1990s, despite pockets of migration such as from Gardabani city. In 1995 the raion was assigned to the newly formed region (mchare) Kvemo Kartli, and was transformed into a municipality in 2006.

In 2006, the boundaries of the Tbilisi metropolitan region were significantly modified at the expense of the surrounding municipalities and in particular Gardabani, which lost roughly 92 km^{2} to the metropolitan region. (Note: Surface area Gardabani in Census 2002: 1304.1 km²; in Census 2014: 1212.2 km².) As for Gardabani, this mainly concerned the area on the northeast side of Tbilisi within the S9 Tbilisi Bypass, but also a large swath on the south side of Tbilisi. The municipality lost several settlements and many residents.

On August 8, 9, and 10, 2008, during the Russo-Georgian War, Russian planes bombed the Vaziani Air Force Base, located 20 kilometers east of Tbilisi in the municipality of Gardabani. Only the base was damaged and there were no casualties. (Note: EU rapport, Volume II, page 216)

== Administrative divisions ==
Gardabani Municipality is administratively divided into 18 communities (თემი, temi) with 40 villages (სოფელი, sopeli). There is one city (ქალაქი, kalaki).

- city: Gardabani;
- daba: none; (Note: due to the 2006 change of municipality boundary the daba Didi Lido and Kojori became part of the Tbilisi metropolitan region.)
- villages: 40, such as Martqopi, Norio and Sartichala.

== Population ==
The population of Gardabani Municipality is 80,329 according to the 2021 estimate, which is a 2% decrease from the last census of 2014. According to the 2014 census, the ethnic composition is 54.2% Georgians, 43.5% Azerbaijani. Small minority groups include Armenians (0.7%), Russians (0.5%) and Assyrians (0.3%). The population density is 66 people per square kilometer.

Population Gardabani Municipality
	1897	1923	1939	1959	1970	1979	1989	2002	2014	2021
Gardabani Municipality	-	-	17,770	▲72,493	▲117,552	▼100,439	▼115,140	▼114,348	▼81,876	▼80,329
Gardabani (Note: Until 1947 the city was called Karaya (Караязы).)	-	904	▲1,846	-	▲9,131	▲13,661	▲17,176	▼11,858	▼10,753	▲11,650
Data: Population statistics Georgia 1897 to present. Note: (Note: The 2014 census found an inexplicable gap with the data from the national statistical office Geostat. UN-assisted research has found the 2002 census was inflated by about 8-9 percent. See, "1. Introduction", Page 1.)

== Politics ==
Gardabani Municipal Assembly (Georgian: გარდაბნის საკრებულო) is the representative body in Gardabani Municipality, consisting of 36 members which are elected every four years. The last election was held in October 2021. Davit Kargareteli of Georgian Dream was elected as mayor.

Party	2017	2021	Current Municipal Assembly
Georgian Dream	32	26	
United National Movement	2	10	
European Georgia	1		
Alliance of Patriots	1		
Total	36	36	

== Economy ==
The municipality's incomes comes from : Industry (mostly the Gardabani power plants), construction, services, agriculture and public services. The priority for the municipality is the development of agriculture and industry. The incomes of the population come mostly from agriculture and minor businesses (such as shops) and public services.

== Gallery ==
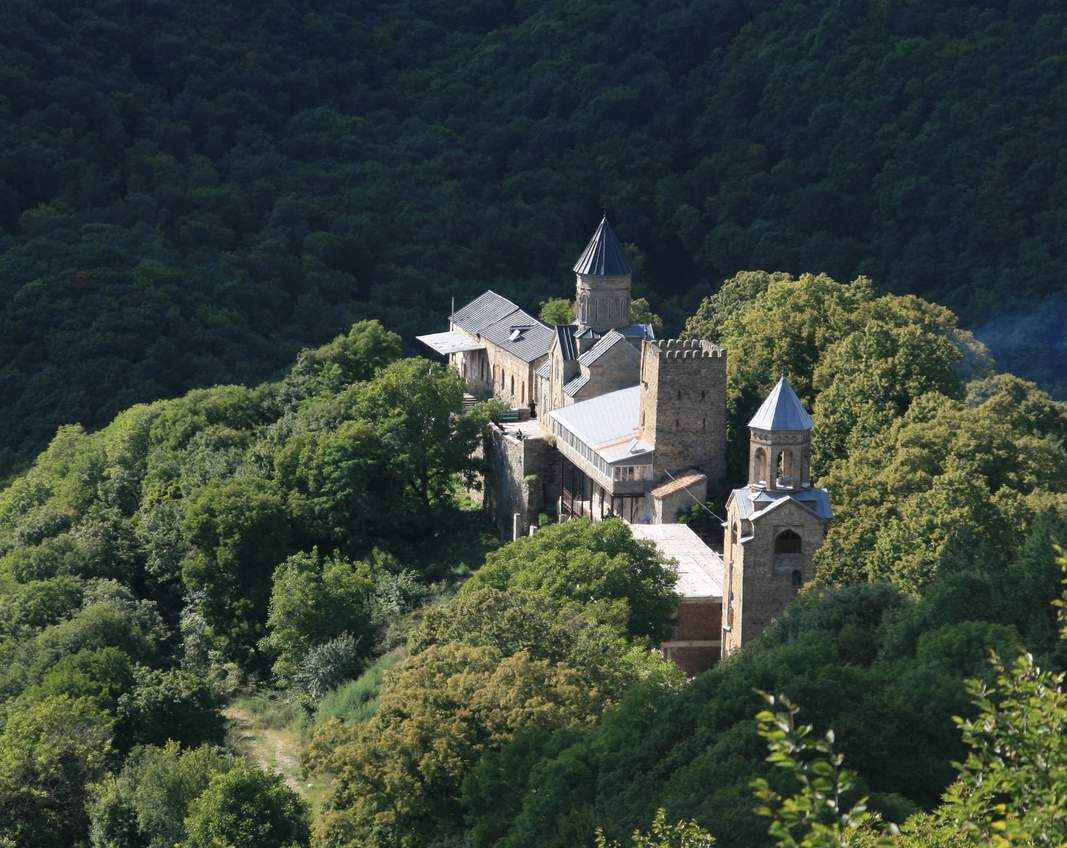
Martqopi monastery

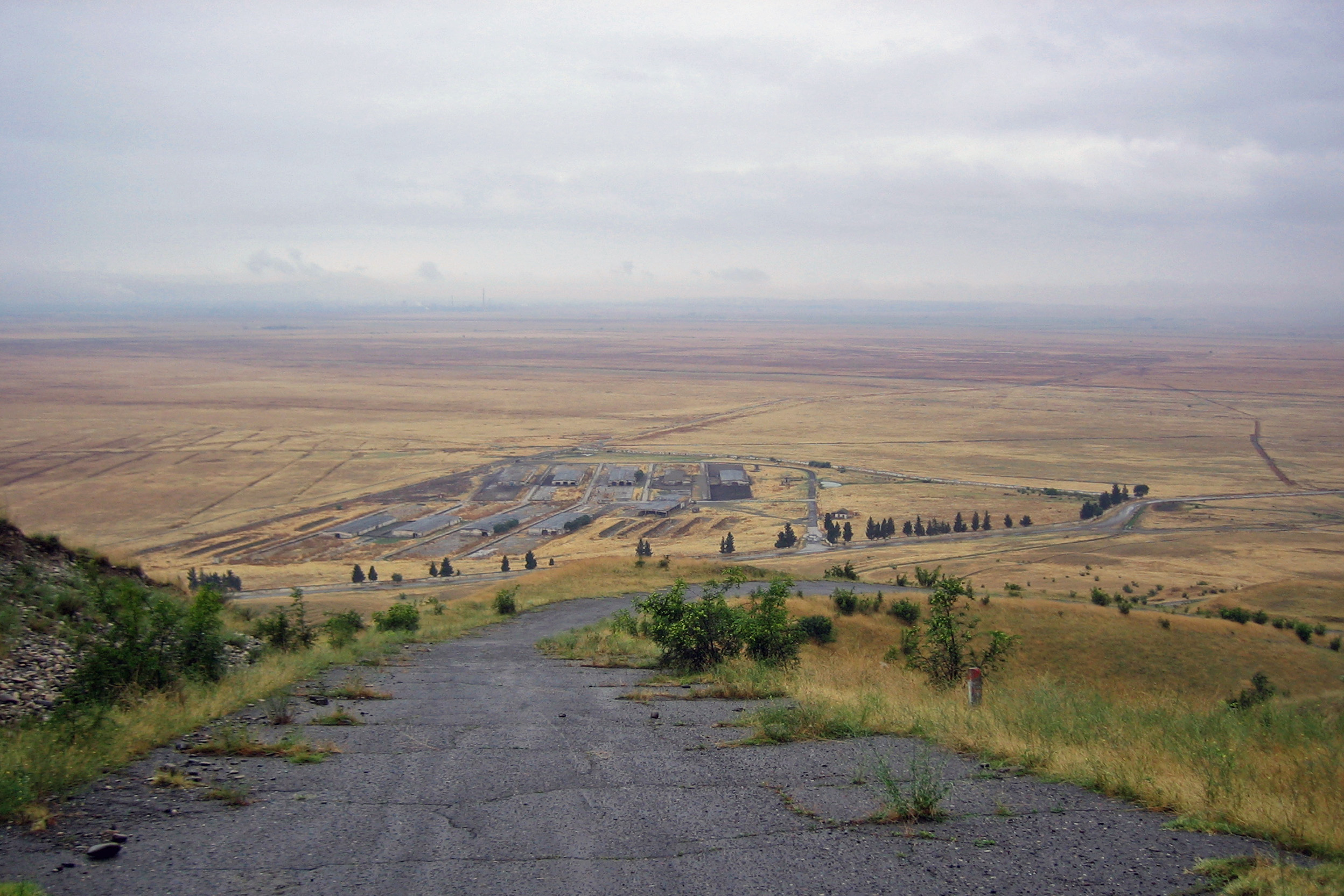
Gardabani environs

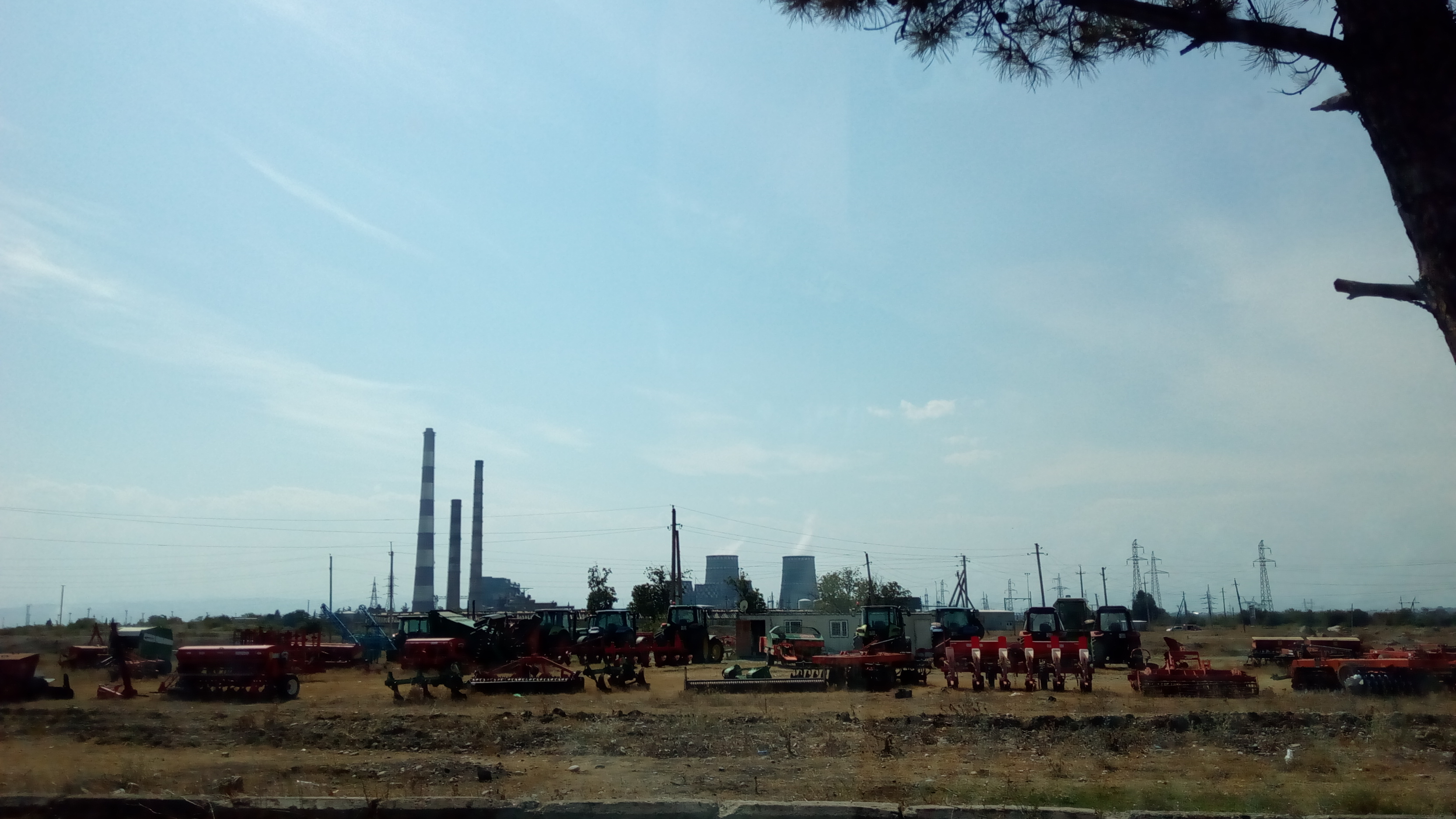
Power station Gardabani

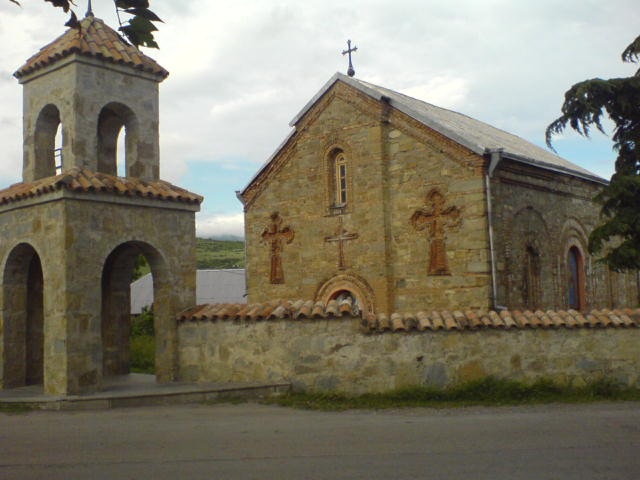
church of the virgin mary in Norio

== See also ==
- List of municipalities in Georgia (country)
